= Matthew Miller (filmmaker) =

Canadian screenwriter and producer

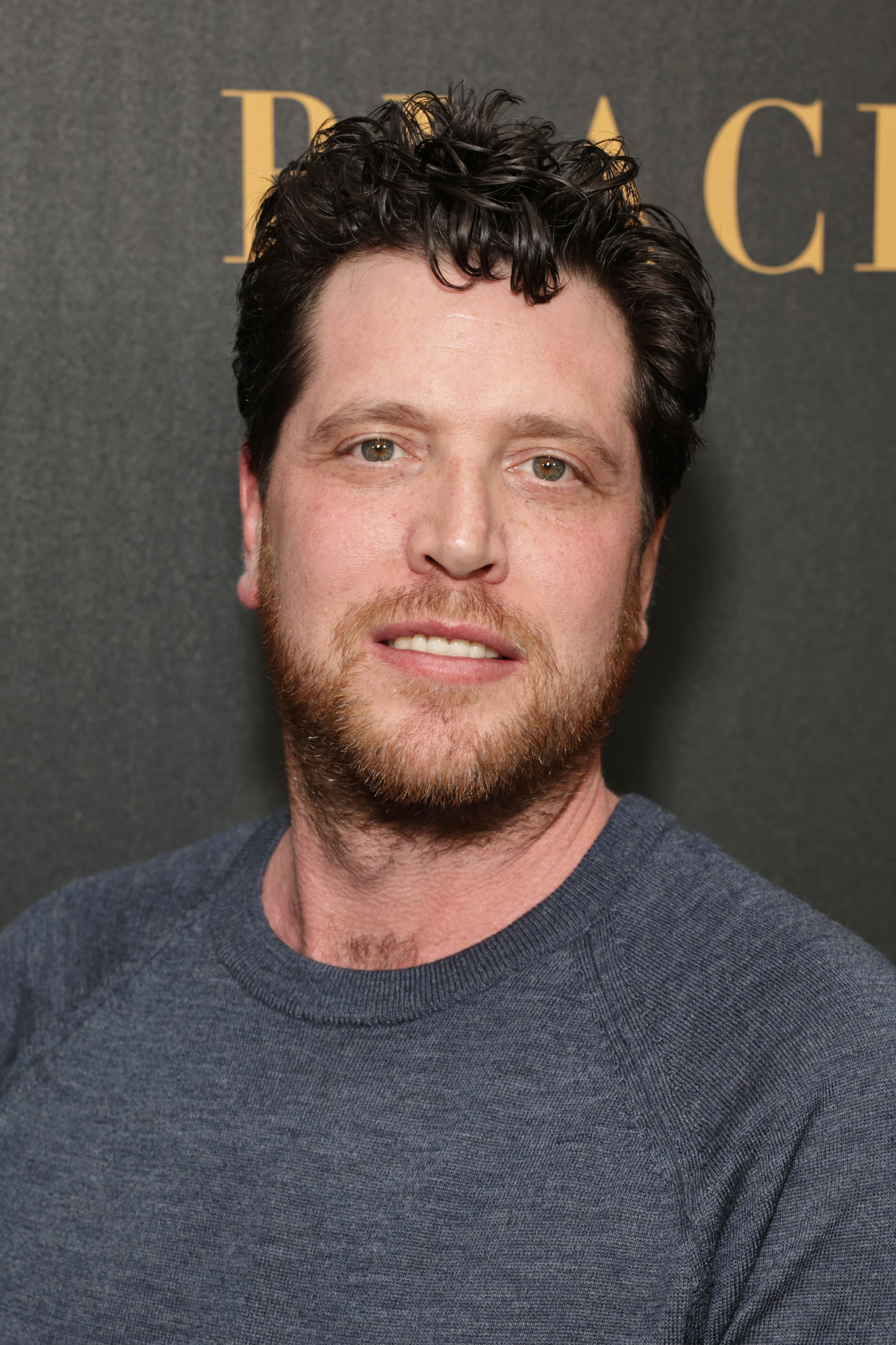
- Miller in 2023
- Education: York University
- Occupations: Screenwriter, producer, director, lecturer
- Years active: 2003–present
- Notable work: The Dirties; Operation Avalanche; Nirvanna the Band the Show; BlackBerry

Matthew Miller is a Canadian screenwriter and producer. He is also a contractual university lecturer. Miller's work has been featured at international film festivals and has garnered awards at TIFF, Sundance, and Berlin.

Miller achieved widespread acclaim for the feature film BlackBerry (2023), co-written with Matt Johnson, which premiered in competition at the 73rd Berlin International Film Festival, and won 14 Canadian Screen Awards, including Best Motion Picture. Miller has also produced Nirvanna the Band the Show the Movie and Mile End Kicks (both 2025), and he co-wrote the screenplay for Johnson's Tony (2026) for A24.

== Career ==
=== 2003–2009: Early work ===
Miller's short film The School played at 25 international film festivals, was named Best Canadian Short Film at the Atlantic Film Festival, and received Gold Plaque at the Chicago International Film Festival. Produced as an undergraduate project at York University, Miller worked with a fellow, Ezra Krybus on the film.

In 2007, Miller released his first feature film, Surviving Crooked Lake, which later won the 2008 Kodak Vision Award for Cinematography at the Sundance Film Festival.

=== 2013–2018: Johnson Collaboration and Zapruder Films ===
In 2013, Miller produced The Dirties, a feature film written and directed by Matt Johnson, which won Best Narrative Feature at the Slamdance Film Festival.

The same year, Miller and Johnson started a production company, Zapruder Films. Three year later, in 2016, the production company released the pair's first project, Operation Avalanche. The film premiered at the Sundance Film Festival, after Zapruder Films declined the premiere offer from the Toronto International Film Festival.

Miller served as a writer and executive producer for the television series Nirvanna the Band the Show, which premiered its first three episodes at the 2016 Toronto International Film Festival. The series was subsequently aired on Viceland in 2017.

=== 2023–present: BlackBerry, Nirvanna the Band the Show the Movie, Tony ===
In 2022, Miller wrote the screenplay for BlackBerry with Johnson, about the Canadian tech company formerly called Research in Motion. The film stars Glenn Howerton as Jim Balsillie, Jay Baruchel as Mike Lazaridis, and co-writer and director Matt Johnson as Doug Fregin. BlackBerry premiered in competition at the 73rd Berlin International Film Festival on February 17, 2023, and attracted widespread critical acclaim.

The film was later re-edited into a limited series and released the following November. It received positive reviews for its detailed portrayal of real-life events. Miller described the adaptation as another opportunity to broaden its audience and promote Canadian media.

Miller signed with CAA, alongside production partner Johnson, in 2023.

In 2024, Miller won the Canadian Screen Award for Best Motion Picture and Best Adapted Screenplay at the 12th Canadian Screen Awards for BlackBerry. In 2026, Miller won the award for Best Motion Picture for Nirvanna The Band The Show The Movie.

Miller served as a producer on Mile End Kicks in 2025. He also co-wrote the screenplay and serves as a producer for Johnson's upcoming film Tony for A24.

== Diversity work ==
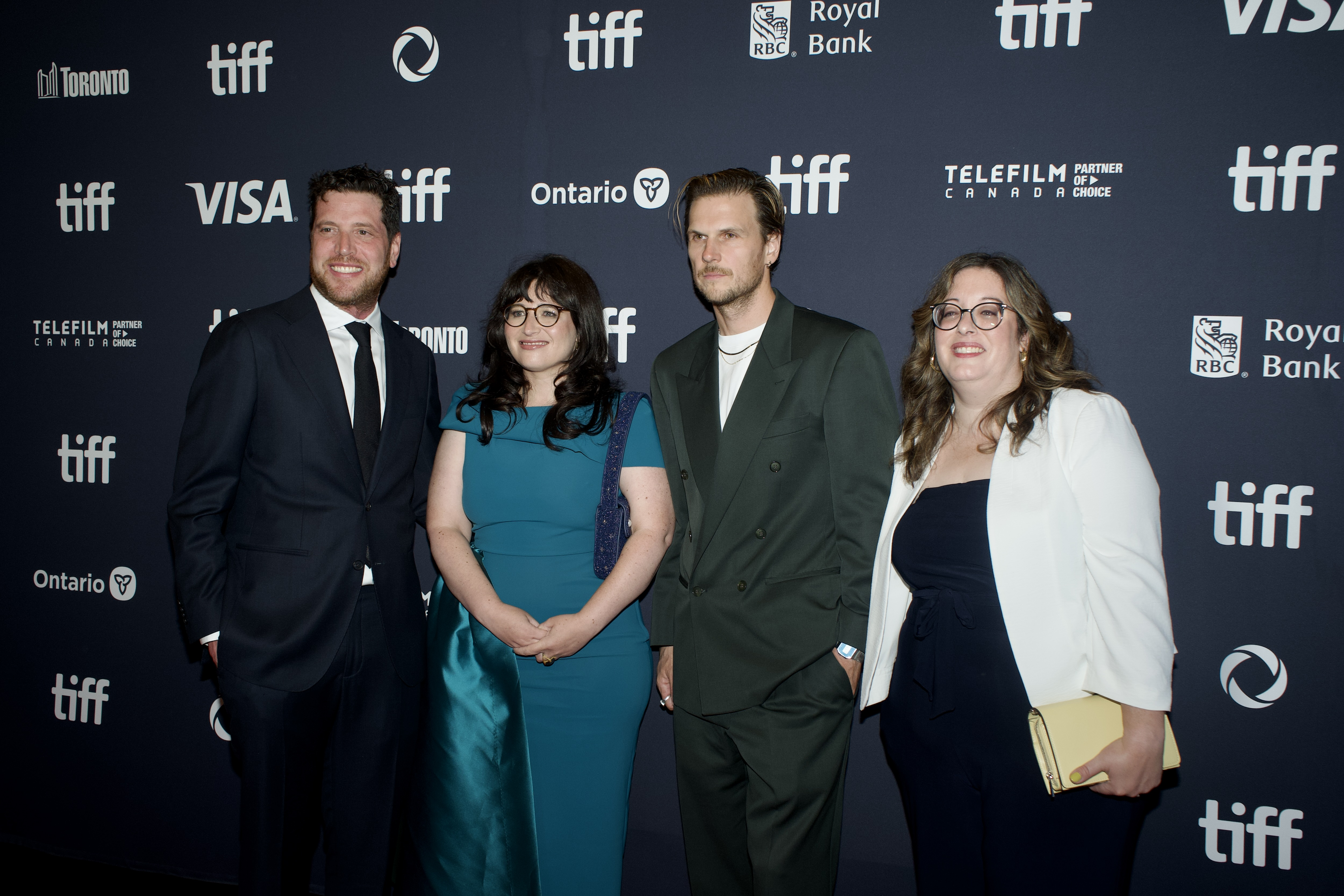
Miller (leftmost) with Chandler Levack, Pat Kiely, and Julie Groleau at the premiere of Mile End Kicks in 2025

In 2016, during festival screenings of Operation Avalanche, Miller noted an evident gender imbalance in the film industry and was vocal about his desire to change that.

Later that year, Miller's production company Zapruder Films (which he co-founded with Johnson), launched a contest to back a first-time female screenwriter with $12,000 CAD in funding, story editor guidance, and script optioning. The company used 100% of its Telefilm financial award to support the project. Chandler Levack and her feature film Anglophone were announced as the winners of 137 entries. The produced film, retitled to Mile End Kicks, was released theatrically on April 17, 2026.

== Filmography ==
=== Film ===
| Year | Title | Director | Writer | Producer | Notes |
|---|---|---|---|---|---|
| 2007 | Surviving Crooked Lake | Yes | Yes | Yes | Co-directed with Sascha Drews, co-written with Drews and Ezra Krybus |
| 2013 | The Dirties | No | No | Yes | |
| 2016 | Operation Avalanche | No | No | Yes | |
| 2023 | BlackBerry | No | Yes | Yes | Co-written with Matt Johnson |
| 2025 | Mile End Kicks | No | No | Yes | |
| 2025 | Nirvanna the Band the Show the Movie | No | Story | Yes | Developed story with Johnson, Jay McCarrol, Jared Raab, Curt Lobb, Matt Greyson, Luca Tarantini and Evan Morgan |
| 2026 | Tony | No | Yes | Yes | |
| 2026 | Crash Land | No | No | Executive | |

=== Television ===
| Years | Title | Writer | Notes |
|---|---|---|---|
| 2017–2018 | Nirvanna the Band the Show | Yes | Co-wrote all 16 episodes with Johnson, Lobb, McCarrol, Raab, Andrew Appelle and Robert Hyland |
