= Guerrilla filmmaking =

Micro-budget film genre

Guerrilla filmmaking refers to a form of independent filmmaking characterized by ultra-low micro budgets, skeleton crews, and limited props using whatever resources, locations and equipment is available. The genre is named in reference to guerrilla warfare due to these techniques typically being used to shoot quickly in real locations without obtaining filming permits or providing any other sort of warning.

Independent filmmakers typically resort to guerrilla filmmaking because they do not have the budget or time to obtain permits, rent out locations, or build expensive sets. Larger and more "mainstream" film studios tend to avoid guerrilla filmmaking tactics because of the risk of being sued, fined or having their reputation damaged due to negative publicity.

According to Yukon Film Commission Manager Mark Hill, "guerrilla filmmaking is driven by passion with whatever means at hand".

== Guerrilla films ==
Janet Maslin of The New York Times characterized cult B-movie filmmaker Ed Wood as a guerrilla filmmaker. As depicted in the biopic Ed Wood, Wood stole a fake octopus for one of the scenes in his low budget films.

Film critic Roger Ebert described Sweet Sweetback's Baadasssss Song, directed by Melvin Van Peebles, as "a textbook on guerrilla filmmaking" in his review of Baadasssss!, a biopic about the making of Sweet Sweetback. Ben Sisario of The New York Times called Van Peebles "a hero of guerrilla filmmaking" who has suffered for his uncompromising vision.

Spike Lee's She's Gotta Have It was a guerrilla film on a budget of $175,000 which made $7,137,502 at the box office. It was Spike Lee's first feature-length film and inspired him to write the book Spike Lee's Gotta Have It: Inside Guerrilla Filmmaking.

New Queer Cinema director Gregg Araki shot his first two films, Three Bewildered People in the Night (1987) and The Long Weekend (O' Despair) (1989) using a spring-wound Bolex camera and scrap film stock, on a budget of $5,000 each.

Robert Rodriguez shot the action film El Mariachi in Spanish. El Mariachi, which was shot for around $7,000 with money partially raised by volunteering in medical research studies, won the Audience Award at the Sundance Film Festival in 1992. The film, originally intended for the Spanish-language low-budget home-video market, was distributed by Columbia Pictures in the United States. Rodriguez described his experiences making the film in his book Rebel Without a Crew. The book and film would inspire other filmmakers to pick up cameras and make no-budget movies.

Pi, directed by Darren Aronofsky, was made on a budget of $68,000. It proved to be a financial success at the box office ($4.6 million gross worldwide). Aronofsky raised money for the project by selling $100 shares in the film to family and friends, and was able to pay them all back with a $50 profit per-share when the film was sold to Artisan.

Troma Entertainment is a film production and distribution company founded by Lloyd Kaufman and Michael Herz in 1974. The company produces low-budget independent films, many of which have developed cult followings. Kaufman has been outspoken about their use of guerrilla marketing and tolerance of piracy, and he has written the books All I Need to Know About Filmmaking I Learned from The Toxic Avenger and Make Your Own Damn Movie!, which outline his philosophy of quick and inexpensive independent film.

Paranormal Activity, directed by first time director Oren Peli, was shot for approximately $10,000. Michael Cieply of The New York Times described the production and release as "guerrilla style". After being well received at film festivals, Paramount put the film on a tour where fans could request a screening.

Escape from Tomorrow, made for $650,000, was "shot in a guerrilla-style manner at Walt Disney World and Disneyland without the permission of the parks," according to Jason Guerrasio of Indiewire. The film was originally expected not to be released due to fears of a lawsuit from Disney, but it was released on video on demand in October 2013.

Clark: A Gonzomentary was a 2012 gonzo journalism-styled mockumentary about an amateur filmmaker documenting a Philadelphian eccentric artist and his creative process. The guerrilla-style techniques implemented were used as part of the story itself, to represent the amateur production within the story. It was shot with a budget of less than $3,000 with a Canon XL2 and a Panasonic AG-DVX100. The director opted out of using a steadicam purposefully to achieve more shakiness. It was awarded Outstanding Lead Actor in a comedy or mockumentary by The 2013 LA Web Series Festival and deemed "a gonzomentary truly realized" by Mark Bell of Film Threat.

Canadian filmmaker Matt Johnson regularly employs guerrilla-style techniques in his work. His debut feature film The Dirties (2013) had a production budget of just $10,000, and multiple scenes were filmed at real high schools during regular school hours. Large portions of Johnson's 2016 film Operation Avalanche were filmed on location at NASA facilities in Houston and Washington, D.C.; Johnson and his crew gained permission by telling NASA they were making a student documentary. In Nirvanna The Band The Show The Movie (2025), Johnson utilizes the same mockumentary hidden camera production style as the film's source material (the web series Nirvana the Band the Show and its television adaptation Nirvanna the Band the Show), shooting in various restricted locations without permits and often involving the unsuspecting public.

Super Demetrios (2011), the first Greek superhero film, made on a budget of €2,000, won the audience award at the 52nd Thessaloniki International Film Festival with the highest number of votes in the history of the festival and became an instant cult classic, "proving that Greek guerrilla cinema can survive without state funding injections" according to Giannis Zoumboulakis of To Vima newspaper.

In his debut, filmmaker Tony Olmos made the crime thriller film South of 8 (2016) with a budget of $9,000. The guerrilla style production took over a year and the film won a screenplay award when it premiered at the Downtown Los Angeles Film Festival.

== See also ==
- Kino (movement) – Film-making organization
- Digital cinematography – Digital image capture for film
- Digital film festivals – Type of film festival
- Planning the Low-Budget Film
- The Guerilla Filmmakers Handbook
- Microfilmmaking
- Underground film – Genre of film outside the mainstream
- Cinéma vérité – Style of documentary filmmaking
- Flash mob – Form of sudden public performance
- Blender Foundation
