= Nirvanna the Band the Show the Movie =

2025 Canadian comedy film by Matt Johnson

- Theatrical release poster
- Directed by: Matt Johnson
- Written by: Matt Johnson; Jay McCarrol
- Story by: Matt Johnson; Jay McCarrol; Jared Raab; Curt Lobb; Matthew Miller; Matt Greyson; Luca Tarantini; Evan Morgan
- Based on: Nirvana the Band the Show and Nirvanna the Band the Show by: Matt Johnson; Jay McCarrol
- Produced by: Matthew Miller; Matt Greyson
- Starring: Matt Johnson; Jay McCarrol
- Cinematography: Jared Raab
- Edited by: Curt Lobb; Robert Upchurch
- Music by: Jay McCarrol
- Production companies: Zapruder Films; Telefilm Canada; Crave
- Distributed by: Elevation Pictures (Canada); Neon (United States)
- Release dates: March 9, 2025 (SXSW); February 13, 2026 (Canada & United States)
- Running time: 100 minutes
- Country: Canada
- Language: English
- Budget: $2 million
- Box office: $5 million

Nirvanna the Band the Show the Movie (stylised in all lowercase) is a 2025 Canadian science fiction comedy film directed by Matt Johnson, from a script he wrote with Jay McCarrol. It is based on their 2007–2009 web series, Nirvana the Band the Show, and its 2017–2018 television adaptation, Nirvanna the Band the Show. As in the previous series, Johnson and McCarrol star as fictionalised versions of themselves in a musical duo called Nirvanna the Band as they attempt to book a gig at the Rivoli in Toronto. A new plan accidentally sends Matt and Jay back in time to 2008.

Development of a feature adaptation began as early as 2009. After the success of his 2023 film BlackBerry, Johnson secured financing for the project through Telefilm Canada. Shot over 200 days with a small crew, the film was produced in a guerrilla style similar to the television series, with many scenes filmed in public without permits and featuring improvised interactions with unsuspecting members of the public. Its plot was heavily inspired by Back to the Future (1985), which is also heavily referenced throughout the film.

Nirvanna the Band the Show the Movie premiered at the 2025 South by Southwest Film & TV Festival on March 9, 2025, before being theatrically released in Canada and the United States on February 13, 2026. It received critical acclaim, winning Best Motion Picture at the 14th Canadian Screen Awards. McCarrol and Johnson were also recognised for their performances, winning Best Lead Performance in a Comedy Film and Best Supporting Performance in a Comedy Film, respectively.

== Plot ==
In 2008, Toronto musicians Matt Johnson and Jay McCarrol form Nirvanna the Band in the hopes of playing a show at the Rivoli. Seventeen years later, they have still not secured a show, with their schemes repeatedly failing. Matt proposes a publicity stunt whereby they skydive off the CN Tower into the SkyDome during a Blue Jays game. They use pliers to cut through the wires of the tower’s tour, but their attempt fails when the SkyDome roof closes during their dive, deepening Jay's frustrations and disillusionment with Matt's schemes.

While Matt becomes convinced they can persuade the Rivoli by pretending to be time travelers, Jay secretly books an open mic slot in Ottawa. Matt modifies their RV with fake time travel equipment inspired by Back to the Future, but accidentally spills his last bottle of Orbitz on it. The next morning, Jay attempts to leave for Ottawa in the RV, learning too late Matt is still inside, and the two are unexpectedly transported to 2008.

Realizing that the Orbitz caused the time machine to work, they attempt to obtain another bottle from their younger selves' apartment. They narrowly avoid being discovered, and a positive interaction between the younger Jay and the older Matt makes the older Jay reconsider leaving the band. When he confesses to his plan to go solo, Matt, hurt, alters their younger selves' planning whiteboard to instruct them not to play the Rivoli. They return to 2025, where Jay has become a successful musician while Matt is a drummer in a Jay McCarrol cover band. Matt confronts Jay at a concert, but Jay denies having any knowledge of the time machine. Jay sneaks out and smashes the last bottle of Orbitz.

Without Matt, Jay finds celebrity life hollow and lonely. In an attempt to make friends with his new band, he accidentally shoots and kills one of them. Now a fugitive, Jay returns to Matt, still claiming to be the alternate version of himself. He offers to help repair the time machine, secretly intending only to use it to reverse the events of his murder.

Without Orbitz, Matt recalls that lightning struck the CN Tower the night their skydiving plan failed. They attempt to power the RV's time circuits using a cable stretched from the top of the CN Tower connected to a power box at an intersection. As the authorities pursue Jay, the cable disconnects from the tower, forcing Matt to reconnect it, but the cable is too short to connect to the power box on the street. As Matt tries to plug it back in, he sees the news that Jay has murdered someone. He completes the circuit with the plier using his body, sacrificing himself to power the time machine, which Jay witnesses.

In the present, Matt, with no memory of the other timeline's events, once again proposes the skydive. Jay suggests beginning the plan earlier to avoid complications. A flashback is shown of Jay traveling back to 2008; he alters Matt's whiteboard message to encourage their younger selves to play the Rivoli, repairing the timeline.

== Cast ==
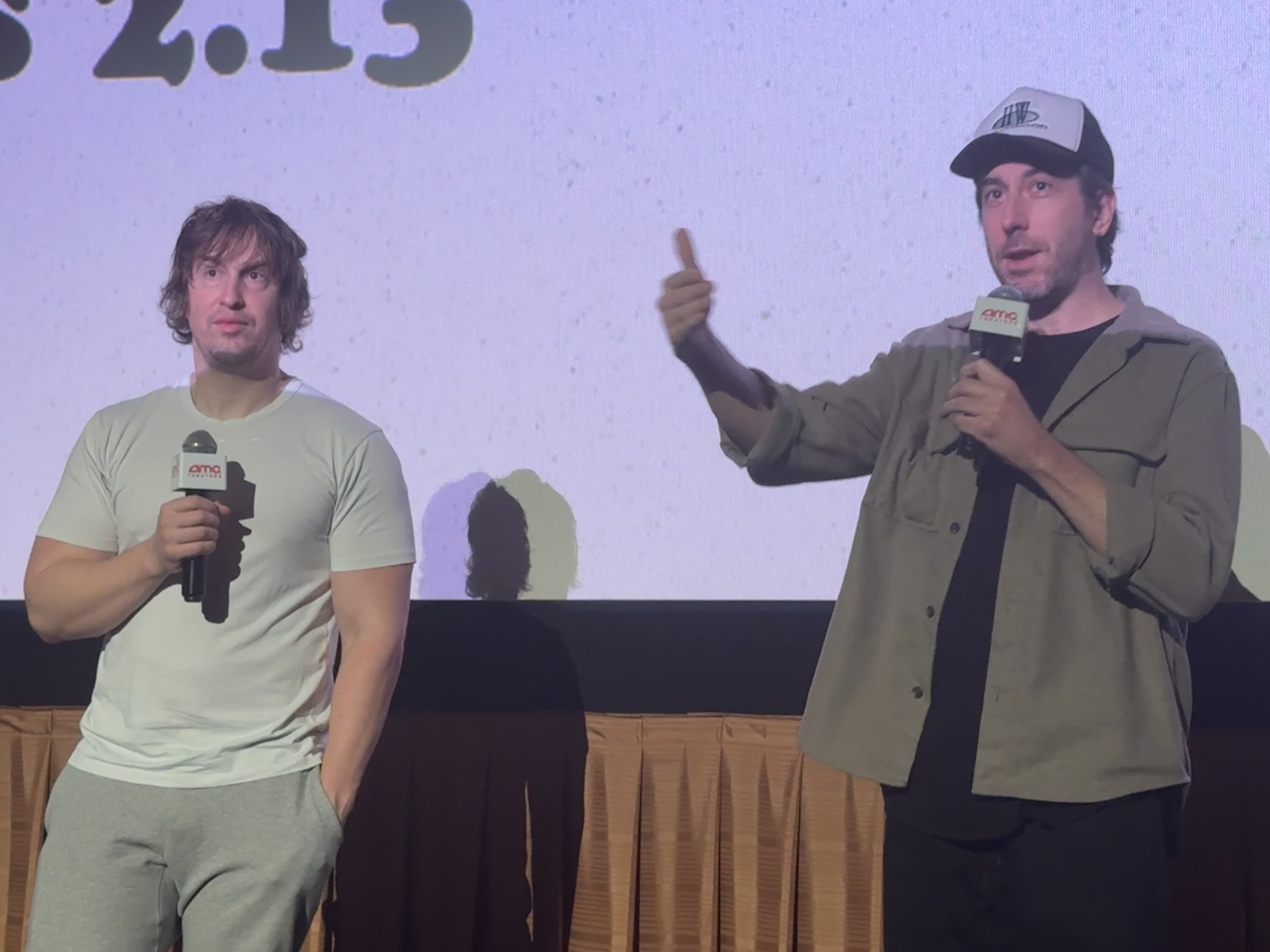
Matt Johnson (left) and Jay McCarrol, who played fictionalised versions of themselves, at a Q&A in Los Angeles

Most of the cast portray fictionalised versions of themselves:

- Matt Johnson
- Jay McCarrol
- Jared Raab
- Ben Petrie
- Ethan Eng
- Michael Scott
- Reid Janisse

A number of real-world figures appear as themselves. Mitch DeRosier, Steve Hamelin, Luke Lalonde, and Maddy Wilde of the Born Ruffians portray Jay's alternate timeline band; they had previously portrayed Matt's band in the episode "The Battle of the Bands" of the original web series. Radio hosts Roz Weston and Mocha Frap interview Jay on The Roz & Mocha Show, while Anthony Fantano reviews Jay's album on his YouTube channel. The film also incorporates archival footage of James Corden, Ellen DeGeneres and Will Smith.

== Production ==
=== Development ===
From 2007 to 2009, filmmakers Matt Johnson and Jay McCarrol co-wrote and independently produced the web series Nirvana the Band the Show, in which fictionalised versions of themselves go to extreme lengths to book their band a gig at the Rivoli in Toronto. Johnson and McCarrol began workshopping a feature adaptation as early as 2009, and Johnson pitched a feature film to Telefilm Canada as early as 2012. A television adaptation, Nirvanna the Band the Show, aired on Viceland for two seasons from 2017 to 2018. The third season was partially produced but not released due to Viceland's discontinuation.

Johnson directed the 2023 film BlackBerry with the aim of securing the third season's release. When this did not eventuate, he pivoted to developing a Nirvanna the Band the Show feature film. BlackBerry's success helped the film secure funding from Telefilm, and in May 2023, it was reported that it would be his next project. Johnson wanted the film to be accessible to audiences who were unfamiliar with the series, and intends to release the third season of the television show after the film's release "if there's enough interest".

Johnson originally planned to film in the United Kingdom but production instead started in the United States. The original version, inspired by A Confederacy of Dunces, featured Matt and Jay in the RV on a road trip across the US meeting people from different cultures, which Johnson compared to The Trip (2010). One sequence filmed in New Orleans parodied The Talented Mr. Ripley. Upon reviewing the footage, Johnson and McCarrol realised that the storyline lacked the scope necessary for a feature film. McCarrol's pitch that the film should "parody the biggest movies of all time", and the existence of unused footage from the original web series featuring a younger Johnson and McCarrol, led to the development of a time travel storyline inspired by Back to the Future (1985). Nirvanna the Band the Show the Movie uses audiovisual material from Back to the Future without permission from its copyright holders, relying on the film's status as parody to provide "fair use" protection under United States copyright law.

=== Filming ===
The production team recontextualised real police statements and press coverage relating to a Toronto shooting for use in the film. During filming, Johnson and cinematographer Jared Raab were captured in a CP24 news report.

Nirvanna the Band the Show the Movie was shot over 200 days, with a crew of between four and eight people. As with the television series, exterior scenes were often shot in public without permits and involved unsuspecting members of the public, in the style of a hidden camera show. The storyline was developed during filming based on these encounters. Johnson and McCarrol's dialogue was often improvised. (Note: Attributed to multiple sources) Most of the film was shot with the Sony PXW-Z280, though the 2008 sequences were shot on the HVX and Panasonic AG-DVX100A. The opening credits sequence was shot on 16 mm film.

The scenes involving the CN Tower were filmed without permits. As early as February 2017, Johnson and McCarrol discussed a potential episode of the television series in which Matt and Jay would fake a terrorist attack on top of the CN Tower. They expected the security staff to refuse them access, and had already shot an alternate scene in which, rather than skydiving, Jay trespasses into the SkyDome dressed as the Blue Jays mascot. McCarrol was arrested whilst filming the mascot sequence. Part of the scene on the CN Tower's ledge was shot by a GoPro on the helmet of an oblivious tour guide. Johnson said: "We're getting this guy to look and move exactly where we need him to in order to create the beats of that sequence without him even realizing he's doing it, with the real crazy trick being that we leave with the footage." According to Johnson, "what you're seeing is literally what's happening, apart from us at the very last second jumping off the tower". A replica of the tower's tip was built for the later scenes showing Matt reeling down the cable. Capturing drone footage of Toronto from the height of the tower's tip was complicated due to regulations which restrict how high drones can fly in the Greater Toronto Area. As a result, the production's drone operator reprogrammed the drone to recognise the top of a tall building as ground level in order to capture the footage.

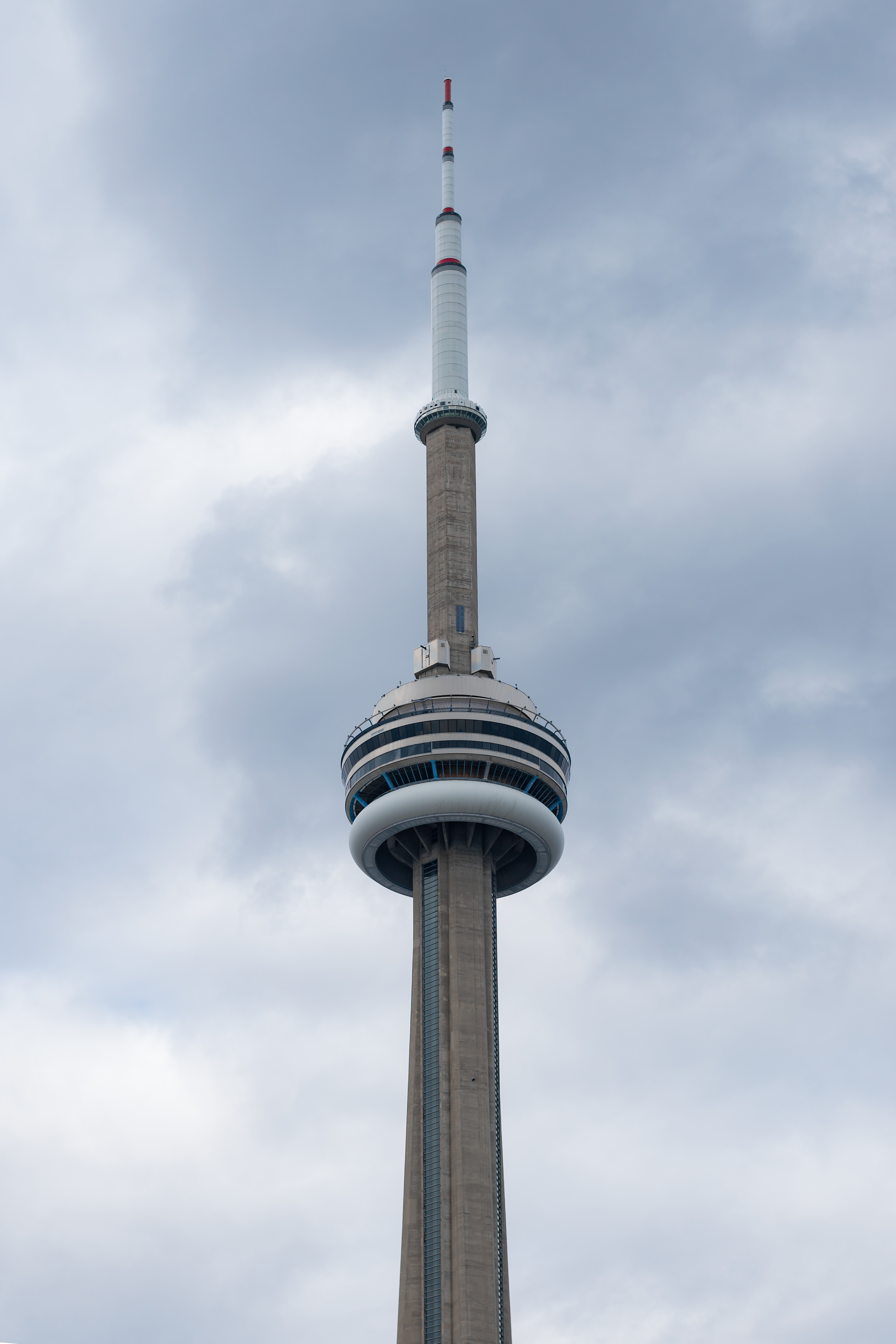
The scenes at Toronto's CN Tower were filmed without permits.

In May 2024, amid the escalating Drake–Kendrick Lamar feud, a shooting took place at the Bridle Path mansion of musician Drake. The film crew were recording a scene with presenters Roz Weston and Mocha Frap, but upon hearing news of the shooting, the crew went to the scene and captured footage of McCarrol running away from the residence amid the police investigation. News coverage of the event was also used in the film; a police officer's statement was recontextualised as a statement about Jay's shooting. (Note: Attributed to multiple sources)

Jay's live performance of "Never Come Down" was filmed at a concert at the Budweiser Stage by Canadian band Arkells. Through a favour to cinematographer Jared Raab—who had shot some of Arkells's music videos—the band allowed McCarrol to perform on stage for a few minutes. (Note: Attributed to multiple sources)

The scene in which Matt parachutes onto the streetcar was filmed on the same day as a Taylor Swift Eras Tour concert in November 2024. Johnson said: "Planning it the same day as a Taylor Swift concert in Toronto means that there's so much chaos in the city that whatever we're doing is not going to compare." The scene in which Matt and Jay watch The Hangover was filmed at the Paradise Theatre, with Nirvanna the Band the Show fans as extras. The production attempted to have the RV towed as part of the plot by leaving it parked on a street during rush hour, but the attempt failed because Toronto authorities did not have a tow truck large enough.

The sequences featuring the 2008 versions of Matt and Jay incorporate unused footage from the web series, and were written by editors Curt Lobb and Robert Upchurch after reviewing hundreds of hours of raw footage. The 2008 apartment was recreated on a soundstage by the production design team purely using footage from the web series as reference.

=== Music ===
As with all of Matt Johnson's previous films, the score is composed by Jay McCarrol. Johnson originally wanted to use the Back to the Future score without paying royalties via fair use law, but lawyers informed him this would not be possible.

McCarrol was musically influenced by composers Alan Silvestri, John Williams and Bernard Herrmann; Silvestri's score for Back to the Future (1985) and Hermmann's score for Vertigo (1958), particularly the former, had an heavy influence. On similarities to Back to the Future, McCarrol stated: "We knew that Back to the Future was going to be the overarching parody but we didn't lean on it the whole time... I was just using some tools of orchestration that evoked the classic adventure movies, and again, the octatonic scale... I wanted to just have enough [musical references] to make you feel like you were watching a Back to the Future movie but still have the freedom to custom score the movie properly, and to set up my themes that have payoffs all on their own." Besides Back to the Future, McCarrol enjoyed parodying the Vertigo score as it provided a dramatic counterpoint that enhanced the film's comedy.

=== Post-production ===
The film concludes with Susannah McCorkle's cover of "Waters of March", a reference to the 2002 documentary Comedian which also features the song over its closing credits and which served as a major influence on Nirvanna the Band the Show. Visual effects were used to remove anachronistic imagery from the 2008 sequences; for example, wireless earbuds worn by bystanders were digitally removed.

In February 2026, Johnson said the film was recut twice—following its world premiere and following its premiere at TIFF—based on audience reaction, and that "there is an outside chance that the Blu-ray and digital release will be different from the theatrical version. It's kind of a major change, too—we'll see if I get away with it." The cut which screened at the world premiere included an extended scene with Matt and Ethan Eng discussing the alternate timeline.

== Release ==
On March 9, 2025, Nirvanna the Band the Show the Movie premiered at the 2025 South by Southwest Film & TV Festival. (Note: Attributed to multiple sources) Later that month, Neon acquired United States distribution rights. It had its Canadian premiere in the Midnight Madness program at the 2025 Toronto International Film Festival, where it won the People's Choice Award, Midnight Madness. The film had a limited release on February 13, 2026. It opened on 365 screens and was projected to make $1.4 million for the 4-day frame.

Neon released a poster for the film which parodies a poster for the IMAX release of Marty Supreme (2025). A24, Marty Supreme's distributor, accidentally cc'd an email containing the poster to members of the Nirvanna the Band the Show the Movie production team. The parody poster was intended to release at the exact same time as Marty Supreme's poster, but it was released three hours later due to a mix-up with time zones.

Nirvanna the Band the Show the Movie was released on digital platforms on March 24, 2026 and was released on Blu-ray and DVD on May 26. The film's score, Nirvanna the Band the Show the Movie the Score, was released in February 2026.

== Reception ==
=== Critical response ===
On the review aggregator website Rotten Tomatoes, 95% of 127 critics' reviews are positive, with an average rating of 8.40/10. The website's consensus reads: "Combining slyly skillful filmmaking with gut-busting laughs, Nirvanna the Band the Show the Movie will be pure heaven for fans of the series while making happy converts of the uninitiated." Metacritic, which uses a weighted average, assigned the film a score of 80 out of 100, based on 26 critics, indicating "generally favorable" reviews.

Peter Debruge of Variety stated that beneath the irony and "cartoonish schemes", the film earnestly explores Matt and Jay's friendship. He also noted that the film operates on an additional "meta" level, inviting audiences to marvel at how various scenes were filmed. Christian Zilko of IndieWire praised the film for increasing the television series's spectacle while keeping the same emotional core. Rachel Ho of Exclaim! called the film "quintessential Canadiana — made by Canadians, for Canadians". The film was named in the Toronto International Film Festival's annual year-end Canada's Top Ten list for 2025.

For That Shelf, Courtney Small wrote that "for all its seemingly scattered ideas, Nirvanna the Band the Show the Movie is rather meticulous in its construction. It works quite well as a time-travel film, on par with recent time spanning comedies such as Beyond the Infinite Two Minutes, getting plenty of milage out of conventional tropes including attempting to avoid their younger selves, and as a pop culture driven comedy."

In a negative review, Frank Scheck of The Hollywood Reporter called the film an "overly meta farce" with "annoying" characters and criticised it for borrowing too heavily from Back to the Future and Bill & Ted's Excellent Adventure (1989). Adam Nayman of Mubi criticised Scheck's review, arguing that Nirvanna the Band the Show the Movie is better understood in the context of English-Canadian cinema, particularly films such as Nobody Waved Good-bye (1964), Roadkill (1989) and Scott Pilgrim vs. the World (2010). Nayman also praised the "casually gobsmacking technical prowess" of the film's cinematography and editing.

=== Awards and nominations ===
Award	Date of ceremony	Category	Recipient	Result	Ref.
Canadian Screen Awards	2026	Best Motion Picture	Matthew Miller, Matt Greyson	Won	
Canadian Screen Awards	2026	Best Cinematography	Jared Raab	Nominated	
Canadian Screen Awards	2026	Best Art Direction/Production Design	Kerry Noonan, Malcom McKenzie	Nominated	
Canadian Screen Awards	2026	Best Visual Effects	Tristan Zerafa, Lou Gatti, Mike Stadnyckyj, Graham Houston, Toshi Kosaka, James Soares, Christopher Shewchuk, Jeniree Bastidas, Onur Can Yol, Luca Tarantini	Won	
Canadian Screen Awards	2026	Best Sound Mixing	Rudy Michael, Lucas Roveda, Dave Mercel, Adam Clark	Won	
Canadian Screen Awards	2026	Best Original Song	Jay McCarrol, Matt Johnson – "The Alphabet Song"	Won	
Canadian Screen Awards	2026	Performance in a Leading Role, Comedy	Jay McCarrol	Won	
Canadian Screen Awards	2026	Performance in a Supporting Role, Comedy	Matt Johnson	Won	
Critics' Choice Super Awards	2026	Best Actor in a Science Fiction/Fantasy Movie	Matt Johnson	Nominated	
Toronto Film Critics Association	2025	Rogers Best Canadian Film Award	Matt Johnson	Nominated	
Toronto International Film Festival	2025	People's Choice Award: Midnight Madness	Matt Johnson	Won	
Vancouver Film Critics Circle	2025	Best Canadian Film	Nirvanna the Band the Show the Movie	Won	
Vancouver Film Critics Circle	2025	Best Director of a Canadian Film	Matt Johnson	Won	
Vancouver Film Critics Circle	2025	Best Actor in a Canadian Film	Matt Johnson	Won	
Vancouver Film Critics Circle	2025	Best Supporting Actor in a Canadian Film	Jay McCarrol	Nominated	
Vancouver Film Critics Circle	2025	Best Screenplay for a Canadian Film	Matt Johnson, Jay McCarrol	Nominated	
