= Nirvanna the Band the Show the Movie the Score =

2026 film soundtrack album

Film score by Jay McCarrol
- Released: February 20, 2026
- Recorded: 2026
- Genre: Film score
- Length: 34:44
- Label: Lakeshore
- Producer: Jay McCarrol

Jay McCarrol chronology
Hell of a Summer (2025)	Nirvanna the Band the Show the Movie (2026)	Tony (2026)

Nirvanna the Band the Show the Movie the Score is the film score composed by Jay McCarrol to the 2026 film Nirvanna the Band the Show the Movie directed by Matt Johnson, with both the composer and director starring as fictionalized versions of themselves. The score is an homage to a number of famous film scores, most notably Alan Silvestri's score to the 1985 film Back to the Future, as the film itself parodies Back to the Future.

The score was released on Lakeshore Records on February 20, 2026, and it received positive reviews, praising its resemblance to Silvestri's score, with one critic calling it a "stunning recreation".

== Background ==
As with all of Matt Johnson's films, the music is composed by Jay McCarrol. He was influenced by composers Alan Silvestri, John Williams and Bernard Herrmann; Silvestri's score for Back to the Future (1985) and Hermmann's score for Vertigo (1958), particularly the former, had an heavy influence in scoring the film. McCarrol had considered Back to the Future as the "overarching parody" but did not want to lean on it entirely, as when he spotted the film, he was sure on the places where the motifs would be needed and where the parody music could be utilized.

"We made the decision to have Jay [to redo the entire Back to the Future score], because he's capable of that [...] So we basically turned a problem into a huge, huge, huge opportunity. In my opinion, the score that Jay did is better than what it would have been if we just used the real Silvestri"

— Matt Johnson on having McCarrol rework the Back to the Future score composed by Alan Silvestri due to copyright problems

Johnson had originally wanted to use the Back to the Future score directly, without paying royalties, hoping that this would be considered legal under fair use given that the film itself parodies Back to the Future. However, when lawyers informed them that this would not be possible, they decided that McCarrol would write the entire score (and record it with an orchestra), attempting to match the style of Silvestri's and other scores.

Besides Back to the Future, McCarrol said that he had a lot of fun parodying the score for Vertigo, as it provided a dramatic counterpoint that made the onscreen comedy funnier.

== Release ==
Nirvanna the Band the Show the Movie the Score was released on February 20, 2026, a week after the film's release.

== Reception ==
Clint Worthington of RogerEbert.com said that "composer [Jay] McCarrol ap[ed] the bombastic rhythms of Alan Silvestri's [Back to the Future] score". Matt Glasby of Radio Times wrote "Full marks, too, go to McCarrol's limber music, which moves from lovely piano motifs to spoof pop hits, with more than a few nods to Alan Silvestri's stirring Back to the Future score along the way. A copyright nightmare indeed." Peter Debruge of Variety called it an "overripe orchestral score", while Robert Abele of Los Angeles Times called it an "enjoyably overwrought orchestral score". Barry Hertz of The Globe and Mail wrote "[the] score by McCarrol [...] perfectly apes Alan Silvestri's twinkly BTF music".

Tyler Nichols of JoBlo.com wrote "Jay McCarrol also pulls double duty, providing the score for the film, and it's insane how close he's able to get to the original Back to the Future score from Alan Silvestri. I was completely convinced they somehow got permission for it, but nope; it's just McCarrol doing a stunning recreation." Critic based at Flickering Myth wrote "Jay McCarrol's score playfully echoes Alan Silvestri's iconic Back to the Future themes while adding enough variation that suits the story being told on screen."

== Accolades ==
Award	Date of ceremony	Category	Recipient	Result	Ref.
Canadian Screen Awards	2026	Best Original Song	Jay McCarrol, Matt Johnson – "The Alphabet Song"	Won	

== Track listing ==
No.	Title	Length
1.	"Goodbye, Matt"	2:22
2.	"Musta Gone Through a Wormhole"	2:19
3.	"Real Goths"	3:18
4.	"About to Make a Big Mistake"	4:21
5.	"Where's Jay?"	1:25
6.	"We, Too, Are Chinese"	2:23
7.	"My Old Friend, Matt"	1:22
8.	"Famous Jay"	2:10
9.	"Breaking News"	1:44
10.	"Kind of Hard to Explain"	2:45
11.	"Without Any of the Drama"	1:42
12.	"Man on CN Tower"	2:38
13.	"One Last Plan"	6:15
Total length:		34:44
