= Jay McCarrol =

Canadian musician, composer, writer and actor

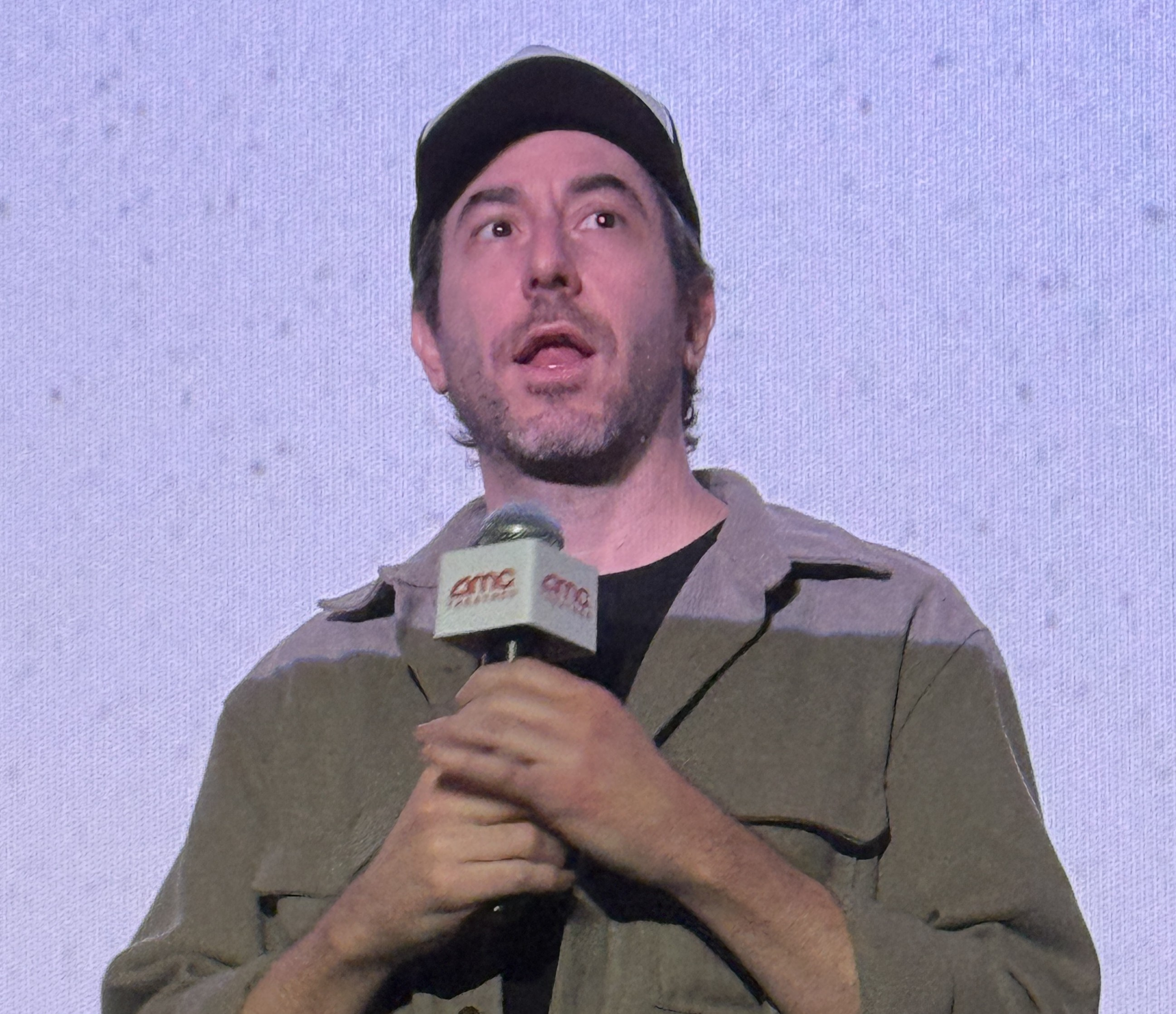
- McCarrol in 2026
- Born: August 9, 1983 (age 43); Mississauga, Ontario, Canada
- Education: Berklee College of Music
- Occupations: Composer; screenwriter; actor
- Years active: 2007–present
- Call sign: Bird

Jay McCarrol (born August 9, 1983) is a Canadian musician, composer, screenwriter and actor. He co-created and starred in the independent web series Nirvana the Band the Show (2007–2009), its television adaptation Nirvanna the Band the Show (2017–2018), and feature film continuation Nirvanna the Band the Show the Movie (2025), with Matt Johnson. He has scored all five of Johnson's films—including The Dirties (2013), Operation Avalanche (2016), BlackBerry (2023) and Tony (2026)—as well as the films The Kid Detective (2020) and Hell of a Summer (2023).

McCarrol has won three Canadian Screen Awards, including Best Original Score for BlackBerry and Best Lead Performance in a Comedy Film and Best Original Song for his work on Nirvanna the Band the Show the Movie.

== Early life and education ==
Jay McCarrol was born in Mississauga, Ontario, Canada, on August 9, 1983. He has a sister, Stefanie.

While attending Erindale Secondary School in Mississauga, McCarrol became acquainted with Matt Johnson, who attended nearby John Fraser Secondary School. The two became friends and creative collaborators, producing many student films together. McCarrol attended Berklee College of Music, where one of his classmates was American comedian Eric André.

== Career ==
=== 2006–2015 ===
After leaving Berklee, McCarrol returned to Toronto and in 2006 he began working as a musical director at The Second City's Toronto location, providing live soundtracks to real-time improvisation.

McCarrol and Johnson co-created and co-wrote the independent docufiction sitcom web series Nirvana the Band the Show, which ran from 2007 to 2009. McCarrol and Johnson star as fictionalised versions of themselves in a musical duo who attempt to book a gig at the Rivoli in Toronto.

McCarrol acted in and composed the score for Captain Coulier (Space Explorer), a short film which played at the 2009 Sundance Film Festival. He also composed the score for Johnson's 2013 feature film The Dirties, and also played the character Mr. Bird.

McCarrol and his sister, Stefanie, formed the synth pop duo Brave Shores, whose debut album, the EP Brave Shores, was released in 2014. The duo toured Canada and internationally. A single from the EP, "Never Come Down", led to Brave Shores being nominated for Best New Group or Solo Artist in the Modern Rock category at the 2016 Canadian Radio Music Awards.

=== 2016–present ===
McCarrol scored Johnson's 2016 film Operation Avalanche. McCarrol and Johnson adapted Nirvana the Band the Show into a television series, Nirvanna the Band the Show, which premiered on Viceland in 2017. Two seasons aired across 2017 and 2018. A third season was partially produced but not released due to Viceland's discontinuation.

In April 2016, during the 2016 United States presidential election, a supporter of Donald Trump uploaded a video featuring clips of Trump, with "Never Come Down" as a backing track, to YouTube. The video ended up going viral, leading to the song becoming "a victory anthem of sorts" for Trump's supporters after he won the election.

In 2018, Brave Shores released La Hoo La La, their full-length debut album. In a press release for the album, McCarrol wrote:

"Never Come Down" was a song I wrote for a cell phone commercial, but it quickly went from television jingle to radio hit. What happened after, however, was even stranger — the song was adopted by online troll types as a sort of Donald Trump victory meme. It inspired the theme of the LHLL. Group mentality, division, indoctrination, power. The world is at once more connected and more divided than ever before. This album is an empathetic exploration of escape, apostasy, and self-discovery – it was a journey from beginning to end.

Johnson and McCarrol co-created and starred in the 2021 animated children's show Matt & Bird Break Loose, a spiritual successor to Nirvanna the Band the Show.

McCarrol scored Evan Morgan's 2020 film The Kid Detective, earning a nomination for Best Original Score at the 9th Canadian Screen Awards. McCarrol later won the award for Johnson's film BlackBerry (2023) at the 12th Canadian Screen Awards. He also scored Billy Bryk and Finn Wolfhard's 2023 film Hell of a Summer. McCarrol has recorded with and toured with Hayden. He wrote with Amy Millan on her 2025 album I Went To Find You, which he also produced.

Following the success of BlackBerry, McCarrol and Johnson received funding from Telefilm Canada to develop a feature film adaptation of Nirvanna the Band the Show—a project they had been workshopping as early as 2009. The film, Nirvanna the Band the Show the Movie, was filmed throughout 2024; it was directed by Johnson and scored by McCarrol. The film makes use of "Never Come Down" as the signature song of McCarrol's character, who becomes a successful musical artist in an alternate timeline. It premiered on March 9, 2025 at South by Southwest, to what was described as "rapturous reception".

The film won critical acclaim and was nominated for the Rogers Best Canadian Film Award at the Toronto Film Critics Association Awards 2025. At the 14th Canadian Screen Awards, the film received eight nominations and won Best Motion Picture. McCarrol also won Best Lead Performance in a Comedy Film, while he and Johnson received the award for Best Original Song for "The Alphabet Song".

McCarrol and Johnson reprised their roles in the 2026 short film Nirvanna the Band Tries to Get an Animation Made, written and directed by YouTube creator Joel Haver.

== Filmography ==
=== Film ===
Year	Title	Writer	Composer	Actor	Role	Notes	Ref.
2009	Captain Coulier (Space Explorer)	No	Yes	No	—N/a	Short film	
2013	The Dirties	No	Yes	Yes	Mr. Bird		
2016	Operation Avalanche	No	Yes	No	—N/a		
2020	The Kid Detective	No	Yes	No	—N/a		
2023	BlackBerry	No	Yes	No	—N/a	Also executive producer and story editor	
2023	Hell of a Summer	No	Yes	No	—N/a		
2025	Nirvanna the Band the Show the Movie	Yes	Yes	Yes	Jay	Co-written with Matt Johnson	
2026	Tony	No	Yes	No	—N/a		

=== Television ===
Year(s)	Title	Creator	Writer	Composer	Producer	Actor	Role	Notes	Ref.
2012	I, Martin Short, Goes Home	No		Yes	No		—N/a		
2015	The Second City Project	No		Yes	No		—N/a		
2017–2018	Nirvanna the Band the Show	Yes					Jay	Created with Matt Johnson; wrote 16 episodes with Andrew Appelle, Robert Hyland, Curt Lobb, Matthew Miller, Johnson and Jared Raab	
2021	This Is Pop	No				Yes	Himself	Episode: "Stockholm Syndrome"	
2021	Matt & Bird Break Loose	Yes					Bird	Voice; created with Matt Johnson	

=== Web ===
Years	Title	Creator	Writer	Composer	Actor	Role	Notes	Ref.
2007–2009	Nirvana the Band the Show	Yes				Jay	Created and wrote 11 episodes with Matt Johnson	
2014–2017	Space Riders: Division Earth	No		Yes	No	—N/a	Songs written by Mark Little, composed by McCarrol, vocals by Tyler Kyte	

== Discography ==
Brave Shores

Albums

- Brave Shores (2014)
- La Hoo La La (2018)

EPs

- La Hoo (2018)

Singles

- Never Come Down (2014)
- Dancing Underwater (2014)
- Cult Kids (2018)
- Middle Game (2018)

Live

- Half (2022)

Solo

- Jay McCarrol (2005)

Original Soundtracks

- The Kid Detective (Original Score) (2020)
- Limited Capacity Podcast (Original Score) (2022)
- Blackberry (Original Motion Picture Soundtrack) (2024)
- Hell of a Summer (Original Motion Picture Soundtrack) (2025)
- Nirvanna the Band the Show the Movie the Score (2026)
- Never Come Down (Nirvanna the Band the Show the Movie single) (2026)
- Tony (Original Motion Picture Soundtrack) (2026)

== Awards and nominations ==
Organizations	Year	Category	Work	Result	Ref.
Canadian Screen Awards	2013	Best Original Music Score for a Program	I, Martin Short, Goes Home	Nominated	
Canadian Screen Awards	2016	Best Original Music Score for a Program	The Second City Project	Nominated	
Canadian Screen Awards	2018	Best Writing, Comedy (with Andrew Appelle, Robert Hyland, Curt Lobb, Matthew Miller, Jared Raab)	Nirvanna the Band the Show	Nominated	
Canadian Screen Awards	2019	Best Writing, Comedy (with Andrew Appelle, Robert Hyland, Curt Lobb, Matthew Miller, Jared Raab)	Nirvanna the Band the Show	Nominated	
Canadian Screen Awards	2020	Best Original Score	The Kid Detective	Nominated	
Canadian Screen Awards	2024	Best Original Score	BlackBerry	Won	
Vancouver Film Critics Circle	2025	Best Screenplay for a Canadian Film (with Matt Johnson)	Nirvanna the Band the Show the Movie	Nominated	
Vancouver Film Critics Circle	2025	Best Supporting Male Actor	Nirvanna the Band the Show the Movie	Nominated	
Canadian Screen Awards	2026	Best Original Song (with Matt Johnson)	Nirvanna the Band the Show the Movie	Won	
Canadian Screen Awards	2026	Best Lead Performance in a Comedy Film	Nirvanna the Band the Show the Movie	Won	
