= BlackBerry (soundtrack) =

2024 film soundtrack album

BlackBerry (Original Motion Picture Soundtrack)

Film score by Jay McCarrol
- Released: March 15, 2024
- Recorded: 2022–2023
- Genre: Film score
- Length: 34:38
- Label: Mondo
- Producer: Jay McCarrol

Jay McCarrol chronology
The Kid Detective (2020)	BlackBerry (2023)	Hell of a Summer (2023)

BlackBerry (Original Motion Picture Soundtrack) is the film score to the 2023 film BlackBerry directed by Matt Johnson. The original score was composed by Jay McCarrol and was released through Mondo on March 15, 2024, nearly a year after the film's release. McCarrol won the Canadian Screen Award for Best Original Score.

== Background ==
As with all of Johnson's films, the original score is composed by his frequent collaborator Jay McCarrol, who considered scoring the film to be very difficult owing to its frantic nature of the film and the sounds that permeate through the film. McCarrol added that the film was very dense with audio which led some sequences being hard to compose, especially in one scene where a character is receiving bad news in an office with loud video game noises going on in the background.

McCarrol wanted the film to be a hybrid between diegetic Doom like music but also "have it sort of get a little fuller as the story drops some new darkness and ominous bad news" as a balance between the score and the video game music, adding that he and Johnson went through back and forth until they found the point where he did not know what to do anymore. The last version he composed was considered to be his favorite cues. The entire score consisted of "bleeps and bloops" which had been referred to the noises that come from computers.

McCarrol had provided the samples and demos after a week long shooting had concluded. The screenwriter Matthew Miller complimented McCarrol's idea of incorporating the sounds of 1990s technology, like the dial-up modem and the pieces where played in the room during the editing, that provided some life to the footage.

== Release ==
BlackBerry (Original Motion Picture Soundtrack) was released by Mondo on March 15, 2024, nearly a year after the film's release. It was also made available in digital and physical formats: CDs and LPs.

== Reception ==
David Rooney of The Hollywood Reporter wrote "regular Johnson collaborator Jay McCarrol's synth score gooses the energy and fits the subject matter, complemented by some choice needle drops from Joy Division, The Strokes, Moby and The White Stripes". Richard Propes of The Independent Critic wrote "Jay McCarrol's original music also manages to enhance the film's effectiveness and not so subtle yet effective tonal shifts." James Verniere of Boston Herald described it "a nervous electronic score by Jay McCarrol".

== Track listing ==
No.	Title	Length
1.	"Do You Hear That?"	1:22
2.	"I Think That's a Bad Idea"	1:09
3.	"I Need a Prototype"	1:21
4.	"Doom"	1:59
5.	"Sacrifice"	0:53
6.	"Selling Minutes"	2:16
7.	"BlackBerries"	1:35
8.	"Network Limit"	1:51
9.	"CrackBerries"	2:40
10.	"Where's Doug?"	1:17
11.	"A Phone Without a Keyboard"	1:49
12.	"A Collect Call"	1:59
13.	"Internal Projections"	2:15
14.	"Doing It All"	4:15
15.	"China"	1:57
16.	"Back When Movies Were Good"	1:48
17.	"That Was a Guy's Thing"	2:02
18.	"Selling Data"	2:10
Total length:		34:38

== Accolades ==
Award	Date of ceremony	Category	Recipient(s)	Result	Ref.
Canadian Screen Awards	May 2024	Best Original Score	Jay McCarrol	Won	
