= Matt Greyson =

Canadian film and television producer

Matt Greyson is a Canadian film and television producer based in Toronto. He is most noted as a producer of the films Wexford Plaza, which was a Canadian Screen Award nominee for the John Dunning Discovery Award at the 6th Canadian Screen Awards in 2018, and Nirvanna the Band the Show the Movie, which won the Best Picture at the 14th Canadian Screen Awards in 2026.

An alumnus of York University, he has been a frequent collaborator with Matt Johnson and Jay McCarrol, including as an assistant director on Operation Avalanche, a field producer on Nirvanna the Band the Show, and an associate producer of BlackBerry.

He has also been a producer and director of the children's television series Miss Persona, and a producer of the TVO documentary series New World Beat.
