= Tony (2026 film) =

2026 film by Matt Johnson

- Theatrical release poster
- Directed by: Matt Johnson
- Written by: Matt Johnson; Matthew Miller; Todd Bartels; Lou Howe
- Based on: Kitchen Confidential by Anthony Bourdain
- Produced by: Tim White; Trevor White; Matt Johnson; Matthew Miller
- Starring: Dominic Sessa; Emilia Jones; Dagmara Domińczyk; Rich Sommer; Stavros Halkias; Leo Woodall; Antonio Banderas
- Cinematography: Michael Bauman
- Edited by: Curt Lobb; Robert Upchurch
- Music by: Jay McCarrol
- Production companies: Amazon MGM Studios (Note: Through Metro-Goldwyn-Mayer; uncredited in advertising material during theatrical release.); Star Thrower Entertainment; Zapruder Films
- Distributed by: A24
- Release date: August 7, 2026
- Running time: 106 minutes
- Country: United States
- Language: English
- Box office: $19 million

Tony is a 2026 American biographical coming-of-age comedy drama film about Anthony Bourdain's early years working in Provincetown, Massachusetts, stories from which were featured in his 2000 memoir Kitchen Confidential. It is directed by Matt Johnson. The film stars Dominic Sessa as Bourdain, alongside Emilia Jones, Dagmara Domińczyk, Rich Sommer, Stavros Halkias, Leo Woodall, and Antonio Banderas.

The film was released theatrically by A24 in the United States on August 7, 2026. It received positive reviews from critics.

== Plot ==
In 1975, a 19-year-old Anthony "Tony" Bourdain is a student at Vassar College. He falsely tells his family and high school love interest Nancy Putkoski that he has received a writing fellowship that would send him to New York City to pursue a career as a writer. When he learns his application was rejected, he impulsively travels to Provincetown, Massachusetts, where Nancy said she was spending the summer. When he discovers Nancy is dating her coworker from a pizza restaurant, he goes to The Flagship, a local seafood restaurant, to drink. While inebriated, he is rude to Mary, the waitress and bartender, and is kicked out and robbed by Sal, one of the restaurant's cooks. While trying to get a ferry ride home, Tony encounters Nancy and falsely tells her he came to Provincetown for research for his fellowship. He accepts her invitation to a party, then returns to The Flagship and appeals to the head chef, who avoids divulging his real name and is referred to only as Chef, for a place to stay. He lies about having restaurant experience and is hired as a dishwasher.

As months pass, Tony is drawn into the raucous, drug-fueled lifestyle and camaraderie among the Flagship cooks, especially the brash but volatile Sal. He begins to experiment with hard drugs, including cocaine, and Sal revives an old heroin habit. After a violent confrontation with Chef upon arriving late for work, Sal quits. Tony is promoted to replace Sal, under Chef's mentorship. Tony also grows closer to Nancy, but continues to lie about the fellowship even after she discovers that he works in a kitchen.

To impress Nancy, Tony invites her to The Flagship, and convinces Chef to offer lobster thermidor as a special. A grease fire starts, made worse when Tony tries to douse it with water, and consumes The Flagship's interior. That night, when Nancy makes sexual overtures to Tony, he is unable to reciprocate and admits he lied about the fellowship and followed her to Provincetown.

On the beach, Chef tells Tony he was planning to give him a full-time job, then tells the remorseless Tony he won't amount to anything. Tony convinces Sal to steal from Chef's house for money to return to New York, then decides to host a clam bake on the beach. Tony falsely solicits donations for repairs to The Flagship to fund the event, but guiltily donates the proceeds to The Flagship after seeing Nancy, the other cooks, and Chef in attendance. He reconciles with them and agrees to part ways with Sal.

Tony returns to his family in New York while Nancy returns to college and The Flagship reopens with its original staff. Tony interviews at the Culinary Institute of America, for which Chef, an alumnus, has given Tony a recommendation letter. Following an earlier suggestion by Chef, who had mused that Tony is a childish nickname, Tony introduces himself as Anthony Bourdain.

== Cast ==
- Dominic Sessa as Anthony "Tony" Bourdain
- Antonio Banderas as "Chef" José Vatel, the restaurant owner who hires Tony
- Emilia Jones as Nancy, Tony's love interest
- Leo Woodall as Sal, a restaurant worker
- Stavros Halkias as Stavros, a restaurant worker
- Michael Jibrin as Tyrone, a restaurant worker
- Monica Raymund as Mary, a restaurant waitress
- Dagmara Domińczyk as Gladys Sacksman Bourdain, Tony's mother
- Rich Sommer as Pierre Bourdain, Tony's father
- Caroline Portu as Robin, Nancy's friend
- Ava Davey-Bissett as Vicki
- Elle Shaheen as Mysterious Woman
- Eric Ripert as cooking instructor

== Production ==
After the release of his 2023 film BlackBerry, director Matt Johnson was "inundated" with pitches for various biopics, including for a film focusing on celebrity chef Anthony Bourdain. Following a meeting with actor Dominic Sessa, Johnson and Miller conceived that the biopic would focus on Bourdain's early career. In August 2024, Deadline Hollywood reported that Johnson would direct the biopic, titled Tony, from a script by Todd Bartels and Lou Howe that was featured on the 2024 Black List, with Sessa starring as Bourdain. Tony is Johnson's first American film as well as his first feature that he does not star in. In April 2025, Antonio Banderas joined the cast. In May 2025, Emilia Jones and Leo Woodall joined the cast. In August 2025, it was announced that comedian Stavros Halkias had joined the cast and that filming had wrapped.

== Release ==
Tony was released in the United States by A24 in select theaters on August 7, 2026, with plans to expand nationwide on August 21, 2026. The first trailer was released in May.

== Reception ==
On Rotten Tomatoes, 93% of 234 critic reviews are positive, with an average rating of 7.7/10. The website's critics consensus reads: "Exploring how the iconic Anthony Bourdain came to be with a scrappy coming-of-age story that's equal parts sweet and tart, Tony is a splendid tribute to mentorship, complete with a standout performance by Antonio Banderas." Metacritic assigned the film a weighted average score of 75 out of 100 based on 50 critics, indicating "generally favorable" reviews.

The New York Times selected the film as an "NYT Critic's Pick." Reviewer Jeannette Catsoulis called the film "splendid" and said, "One of the many charms of Tony...is that the film would be just as pleasurable if its subject were a complete unknown. In other words, this fictionalized origin tale of Anthony Bourdain, the celebrated chef, writer, raconteur and television host who died in 2018, asks no more of its audience than any other movie about a mouthy teenager on the rocky road to adulthood."

The Wall Street Journal's Kyle Smith was particularly laudatory, writing "The unshowy dedication to craft is a marvel, and so is much else in this crystalline little film. It’s the most exhilarating experience I’ve had at the movies this year."
