= The Rivoli =

Toronto club

Rivoli
- RIV
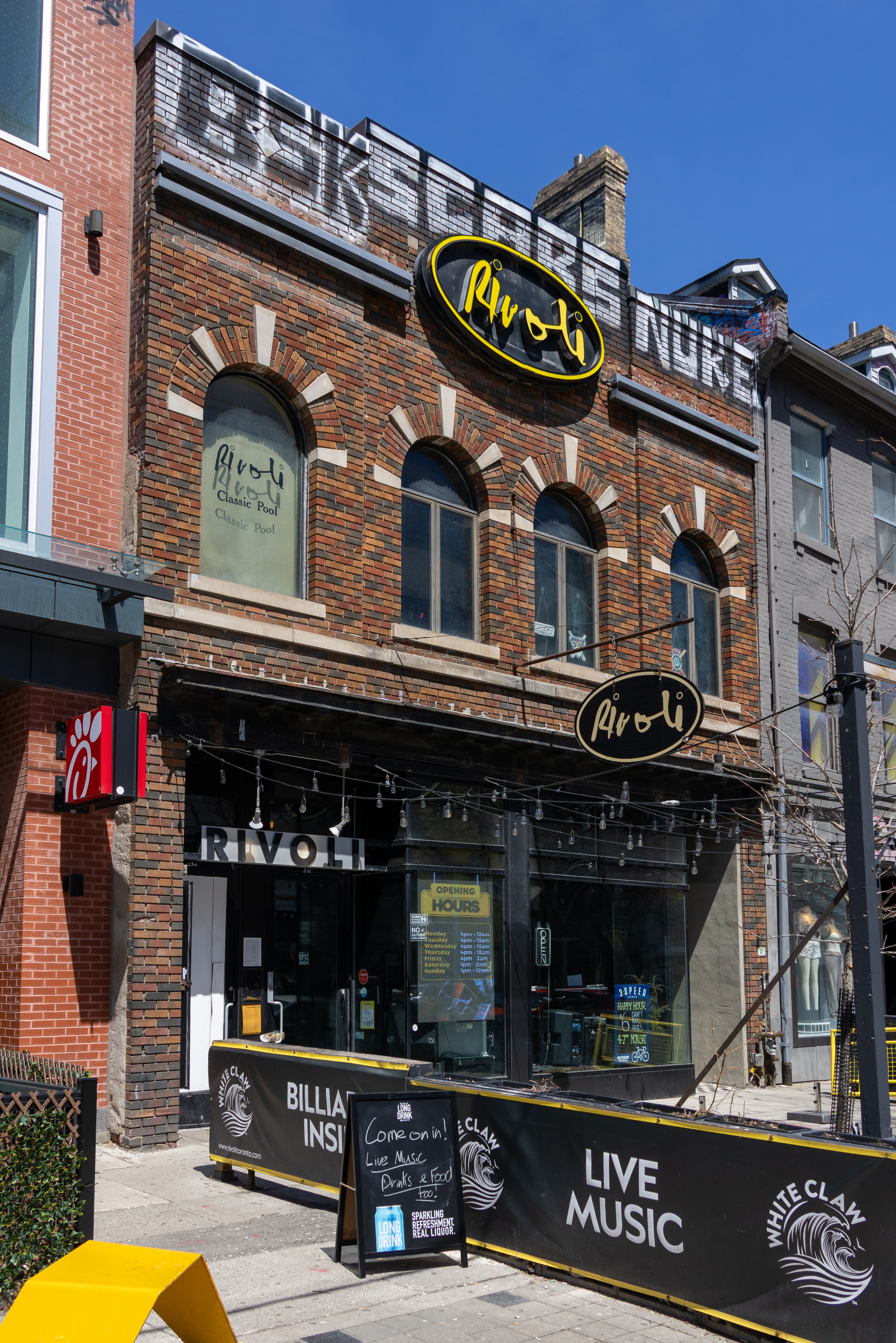
- Exterior view in 2026
- Interactive map of Rivoli
- Location: 334 Queen Street West, Toronto, Ontario, Canada
- Coordinates: 43.649276°N 79.394914°W
- Owner: John Christensen
- Capacity: 70 (dining room), 200 (back room), 200 (upstairs pool hall)
- Type: Live music venue; nightclub; pool hall; restaurant
- Events: Alternative, Indie

Construction
- Opened: 1982

Website
- www.rivolitoronto.com

The Rivoli is a bar, restaurant and performance space, established in 1982, on Queen Street West in Toronto, Ontario, Canada.

The club originally earned a reputation as one of Canada's hippest music clubs, and many major Canadian comedy and musical performers have played on its stage, including The Kids in the Hall, Gord Downie, The Frantics and Sean Cullen. The Drowsy Chaperone premiered at the Rivoli and went on to subsequent productions and eventually a highly successful run on Broadway.

== Venue layout and design ==
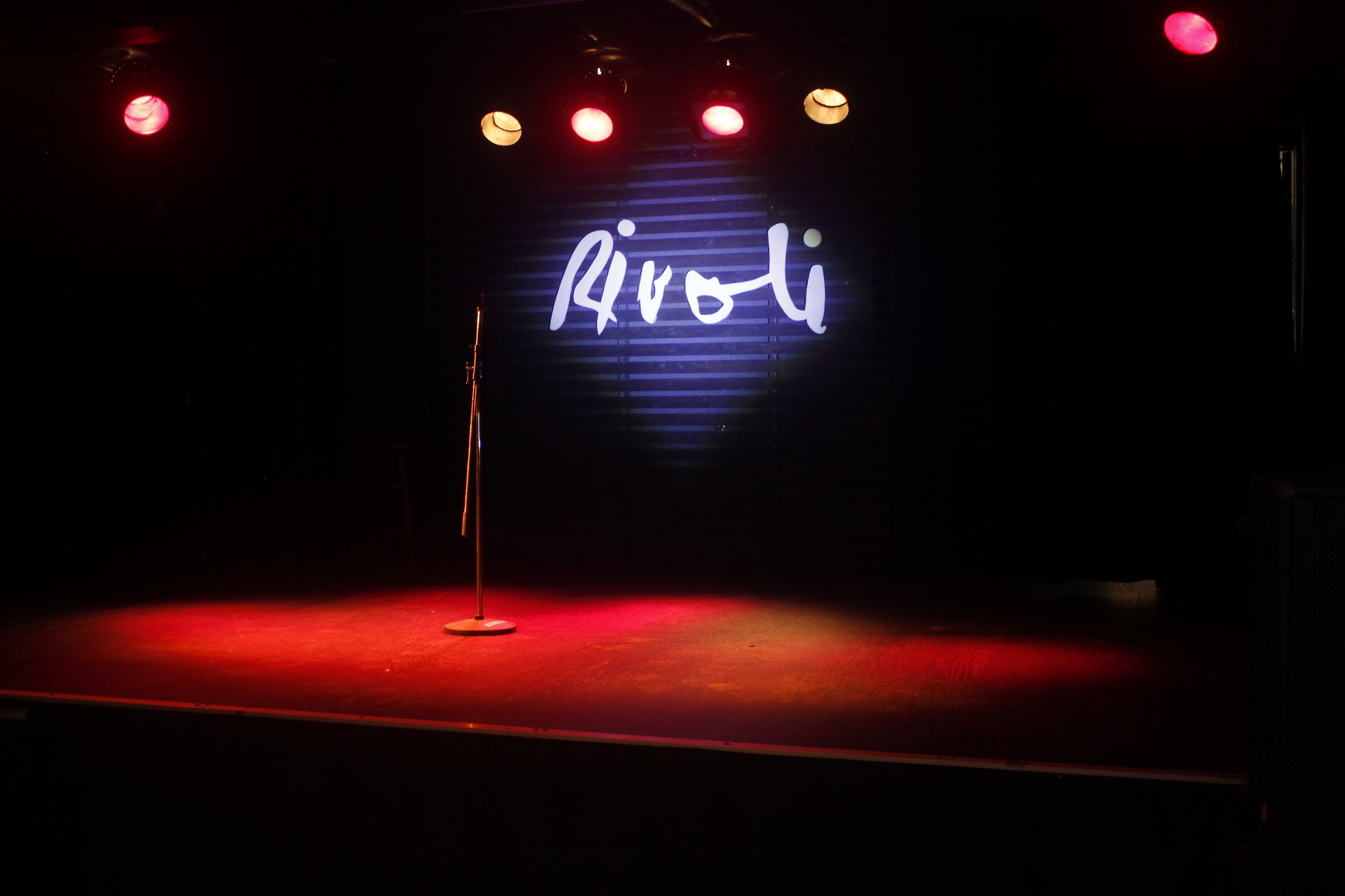
Event stage in the back room

The venue is divided into three main areas, the front, the upstairs and the back. The front of the venue has a bar along most of its west wall. The east side of the front room, separated from the bar by a dividing wall, are tables for dining. Upstairs there is a pool hall with 11 vintage and antique tables. The space is large and sometimes dance nights or private parties are hosted there. The back room of the venue contains a stage at the back. There is a smaller bar in the back room, and some bar seating along the side walls.

The audience area is sometimes open for standing room, sometimes tables and chairs are set up, and sometimes chairs are set up in rows. Seating is rarely assigned or reserved. Patrons are typically free to eat or drink in the front room without paying for admission to shows.

The Rivoli sign, seen outside the club on Queen Street West, features the handwriting of musician Mary Margaret O'Hara.

== History ==
Launched in 1982 by the hospitality entrepreneurs Andre Rosenbaum, David Stearn, and Jeff Strasburg (already partners, since 1978, in Queen Mother Cafe down the street), their new venture the Rivoli almost immediately became synonymous with Toronto's 1980s black-garbed Queen West scene. Mike Myers’ Saturday Night Live German club character Dieter was inspired by a Rivoli waiter. This reputation waned as the club's clientele became more eclectic and upscale.

=== Comedy ===
The Rivoli has had a long association with alternative comedy, of the sketch, improv, and stand-up variety. Additionally, primarily through its Monday night comedy shows, the venue developed a reputation as a breeding ground or career springboard for talented comedy performers, some of whom would go on to prominent careers in the entertainment industry. Talent scouts for Montreal's Just For Laughs comedy festival and the major television networks still routinely trawl the Monday night comedy shows.

==== The Kids in the Hall ====
Soon after opening, among the variety of acts, the Rivoli began hosting an early iteration of The Kids in the Hall comedy troupe, consisting at the time of Toronto-based improv comedy performers Dave Foley, Kevin McDonald, and Luciano "Luc" Casimiri who did their short 10-minute sketch comedy sets at the back of the bar-restaurant in addition to appearing at other performance venues around the city such as the Poor Alex Theatre, Factory Theatre, and Theatresports competitions at Harbourfront Centre. The group would soon be joined by Frank van Keeken, Norm Hiscock, Garry Campbell, as well as Bruce McCulloch and Mark McKinney who had moved from Alberta, and eventually Toronto actor Scott Thompson.

Though initially performing for small audiences of 10 to 15 people, the troupe kept on with their Rivoli appearances, and, over the years that followed, continued developing a quirky and surreal sketch comedy repertoire—distinct from other Toronto comedy staples, the Second City and Yuk Yuk's. By January 1985, the troupe found its core five on-stage players—Foley, McDonald, McCulloch, McKinney, and Thompson—who began performing a lot more frequently at the Rivoli as part of comedian Briane Nasimok's comedy night showcase on Mondays, eventually taking it over for themselves. On McCulloch's insistence, the group decided to do a fresh stage show every week at the venue—getting together on Fridays after finishing their full-time day jobs and coming up with an hour worth of material by Monday night. Their 2-hour Monday night Rivoli shows consisted of an hour of new material followed by an hour of improv. Building an audience proved difficult due to the group's insistence on not repeating previously-performed material; they often faced situations with individual audience members liking them one Monday and returning the following week, bringing more people along, only to then be disappointed by not recognizing any of the sketches.

Struggling to sell tickets and on the verge of breaking up, during spring 1985 the Kids decided to temporarily discontinue their new-material-every-week practice by doing a 'best of' week, which they were accommodated for by the Rivoli owners that in addition to Monday, also allowed them to perform on the more coveted Wednesday, Thursday, Friday, and Saturday nights. The 'best of' week was the first time they packed the venue. Within a few months, the Kids would be noticed by the Saturday Night Live scouts and its co-creator and returning producer Lorne Michaels, an established Toronto-raised show business insider who, following an audition that also took place at the Rivoli, proceeded to hire McCulloch and McKinney as writers for SNL's 1985-86 season. Three years later, in fall 1988, he put the entire troupe on television as a 25-minute sketch show pilot on CBC in Canada and HBO in the United States, leading to it being picked up as a series in 1989 by both networks.

From 1987 to 1990, the Journal of Wild Culture held its regular avant-garde vaudeville nights, the Café of Wild Culture, featuring a mix of artists exploring the magazine's ecology and imagination mandate.

==== The ALTdot COMedy Lounge ====
Since the 1990s, the Rivoli has been home to The ALTdot COMedy Lounge, Toronto's most popular alternative comedy show.

=== Music ===
Many big name Canadian and international artists who have played at the Rivoli:

- Adele
- Arcade Fire
- Archers of Loaf
- Beck
- Blue Rodeo
- Caribou
- Chalk Circle
- Cowboy Junkies
- Do Make Say Think
- Elliott Smith
- Feist
- The Flaming Lips
- Hayden
- Hole
- Iggy Pop
- Injury Reserve
- Indigo Girls
- Jane Siberry
- Jonathan Richman
- L7
- Michelle Shocked
- Moist
- Moe Tucker
- NoMeansNo
- Peaches
- Screaming Trees
- Spoons
- Stone Temple Pilots
- Sum 41
- Tori Amos

Canadian music legend Neil Young played a private concert at The Rivoli on November 10, 2023. The event was a 50th birthday celebration for the billionaire CEO of the Canada Goose clothing company, Dani Reiss. Arkells also played at the event.

== Recent history ==
In 2014, the original owners Rosenbaum, Stearn, and Strasburg sold the business to Jenna Wood, Sarah Henning, and Jessica McHardy. Henning left the venture in early 2020; several months later amid the COVID-19 pandemic, remaining partners Wood and McHardy listed the business for sale for Can$500,000.

In May 2022, on the occasion of The Kids in the Hall television show returning after 27 years, the Rivoli unveiled a plaque honouring the troupe and recognizing its association with the venue.

== In popular culture ==
The Rivoli is significant to the plot of the Canadian mockumentary-sitcom web series Nirvana the Band the Show, as well as its sequel television series Nirvanna the Band the Show and feature film Nirvanna the Band the Show the Movie. Series creators and lifelong best friends Matt Johnson and Jay McCarrol star as fictionalised versions of themselves attempting to book a show at the Rivoli for their band. The series is shot on location in Toronto, with most episodes featuring scenes recorded on the premises of the Rivoli during business hours.
