= Operation Avalanche (film) =

2016 conspiracy thriller film by Matt Johnson

- Theatrical release poster
- Directed by: Matt Johnson
- Written by: Matt Johnson; Josh Boles
- Produced by: Matthew Miller; Lee Kim; Matt Johnson
- Starring: Matt Johnson; Owen Williams; Andy Appelle
- Cinematography: Andy Appelle; Jared Raab
- Edited by: Curt Lobb
- Music by: Jay McCarrol
- Production companies: Vice Films; Zapruder Films; Resolute Films
- Distributed by: Lionsgate Premiere
- Release dates: January 22, 2016 (Sundance Film Festival); September 16, 2016 (United States)
- Running time: 94 minutes
- Countries: Canada; United States
- Language: English

Operation Avalanche is a 2016 found footage conspiracy thriller film directed by Matt Johnson, who co-wrote it with Josh Boles. Set in the late 1960s, Johnson and Owen Williams star as CIA agents who infiltrate NASA to expose a suspected KGB mole, only to become embroiled in a conspiracy to fake the Apollo 11 moon landing.

Johnson and producer Matthew Miller conceived of the project shortly after the release of their 2013 film The Dirties; Johnson did not believe that the moon landing was faked but found it appealing subject matter for a faux documentary. Principal photography took place in Toronto, Houston and Washington, D.C.. Operation Avalanche was largely improvised and combines newly shot footage with archival material to emulate the appearance of a 1960s documentary. Additionally, the production shot on location at NASA's facilities under the guise of filming a documentary.

Operation Avalanche premiered at the 2016 Sundance Film Festival and was released theatrically in the United States by Lionsgate on September 16, 2016. It received generally favorable reviews from critics, receiving nominations for Best Motion Picture and Best Director at the 5th Canadian Screen Awards.

== Plot ==
The film opens with President John F. Kennedy's 1962 "We choose to go to the Moon" speech.

In 1967, ambitious CIA agents Matt Johnson, Owen Williams, Andy Apelle, and Jared Raab convince their superiors to let them infiltrate NASA—disguised as a documentary crew filming the Apollo 11 mission—in an effort to root out a KGB mole inside the organization. After bugging NASA administrator James Webb's phone, the crew discovers from Webb's secret conversation with an unidentified man that the Lunar Module Eagle lander is incapable of landing on the Moon. When the crew inform their superior, Brackett, they are told to leave NASA. To prevent the Soviet Union from winning the Space Race and secure a promotion, Matt conceives of "Operation Avalanche", whereby the crew will fake footage of the Moon landing. Matt directs test footage of Owen in an astronaut suit, which gains the approval of Brackett, who sends agent Josh Boles to keep an eye on their progress.

Jared reviews footage captured at a NASA pool party and notices a pair of men filming the crew. Matt learns that director Stanley Kubrick is in production on 2001: A Space Odyssey, which involves sequences on the moon. Matt and Jared travel to Shepperton Studios in England, where they film the 2001 set with a hidden camera and learn about front screen projection, which enables the crew to make their faked moon footage more convincing.

Back in the United States, the crew construct a lunar module and moon set in a studio, and plan for the Apollo 11 astronauts to transmit the pre-recorded footage whilst in orbit. Matt becomes frantic when he learns that, if "Operation Avalanche" fails, the CIA plans to shoot down the real Apollo 11 lander and blame the Soviets. Matt begins burying incriminating footage in a field.

During a shoot, Owen notices a pair of men waiting outside the studio who drive away when approached. Boles informs Matt and Owen that the mole has been caught. However, Owen identifies the supposed mole as the unidentified man from Webb's secret conversation. Owen suspects that Boles is part of the CIA, and planning to kill the crew to tie up loose ends.

Matt delivers the completed moon landing footage to Boles. The Apollo 11 launch goes ahead and Matt burns the props used in the videos. Owen calls Matt to warn him that the men watching him are outside his house. Matt returns to his motel room, finding it trashed by men sweeping the premises. Matt, Jared and Andy dig up Matt's incriminating film reels from the field. As they leave, they are engaged in a shootout and car chase with two men, but narrowly escape. Matt finds Owen hanged in his garage, staged to look like a suicide.

Matt trusts Andy with hiding the film reels. He calls Brackett on a payphone and offers to trade his location for the names of the agents who killed Owen. He threatens to release the footage and declines Brackett's offers to make him head of his own department. As a forlorn Matt watches the "Moon landing" play on public television, Creedence Clearwater Revival's "Fortunate Son" plays over America celebrating the Apollo 11 landing.

== Cast ==
Many of the actors, including the five leads, used their real names and are shown in the end credits as "Himself" or "Herself".

- Matt Johnson
- Owen Williams
- Andy Appelle
- Jared Raab
- Josh Boles
- Ray James as Director Brackett
- Sharon Belle
- Madeleine Sims-Fewer

== Production ==
=== Conception ===
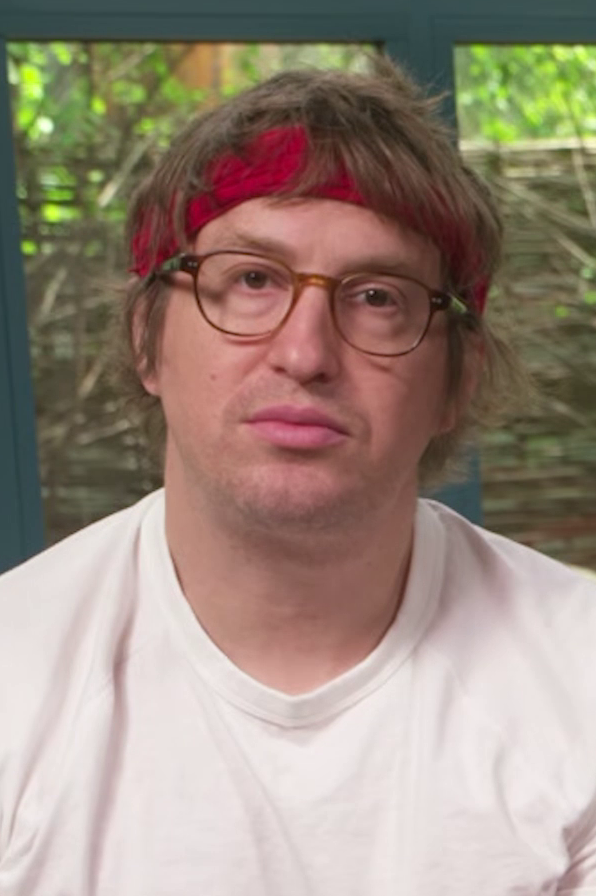
Director Matt Johnson (left) and producer Matthew Miller

On a flight home from the premiere of their film The Dirties (2013), director Matt Johnson and producer Matthew Miller conceived of a "fake documentary" focused on faking the Apollo 11 moon landing. Although Johnson did not believe that the Apollo 11 moon landing was faked, he found the "lies and duplicity" surrounding Moon landing conspiracy theories "very appealing". Miller and Johnson reunited with various cast and crew of The Dirties, including co-writer Josh Boles, co-star Owen Williams and composer Jay McCarrol. Influences on the film included the Maysles Brothers film Gimme Shelter (1970), the documentary series An American Family (1973), Orson Welles's docudrama film F for Fake (1973) and the political thriller films The Manchurian Candidate (1962) and JFK (1991).

=== Principal photography ===
Operation Avalanche was Johnson's thesis film for his Master of Fine Arts degree at York University, completed in 2015. Via the masters program, the production were able to access 1960s film gear for use in the film. Principal photography, which shot for 42 days, began on June 30, 2014, and took place mainly in Toronto, Houston, and Washington, D.C. The crew varied in size, from 15 people at its largest to only Johnson and a camera operator at its smallest. Johnson and Boles created a roughly ten page outline for the film rather than a formal script, and began shooting in an improvisatory manner. The crew continually refined the film's structure based on the footage captured. Similarly to The Dirties, scenes were often shot in public spaces without permits; however, the period nature of Operation Avalanche made this highly difficult. Anachronistic visuals such as smartphones were digitally removed from footage. Johnson has stated he dislikes the description "found footage" applied to the film, preferring "fake documentary". Johnson used his own name for his character to allow for simpler interactions with on-screen individuals not involved in the production.

Whilst Johnson and cinematographer Jared Raab were in England for The Dirties's release in 2014, they attended but bailed on a Shepperton Studios tour to capture shots of the lot where 2001: A Space Odyssey had been filmed. They were later thrown out of the studios by security, who assumed Johnson and Raab were paparazzi.

The production sought to film at NASA as recreating their facilities as sets was prohibitively expensive. To get permission to shoot on location, Johnson claimed he was making a student documentary on the Apollo program. Johnson noted the irony that both he and his character were shooting at NASA under false pretenses. The production benefited from the fact that NASA's campus had remained largely unchanged since the 1960s. The NASA personnel shown in the film were real, and the film's storyline was then "built around" these filmed conversations. NASA later released a statement that "the film project was misrepresented" and "We are disappointed the filmmakers would exploit the openness and transparency of those involved."

The film's car chase was originally envisaged as taking place in a city street, but was moved to an empty field due to the difficulty of dressing a period-accurate street. The vintage cars often broke down during filming. The sequence was performed about seven times and captured in one take. The moon landing sequences were highly challenging to produce. Johnson remarked: "I had zero faith that the moon landing was faked before we started [production on Operation Avalanche] and I have even less now." For scenes depicting the construction of the fake lunar module, the production filmed the real construction team hired to build the set.

=== Use of archival footage ===
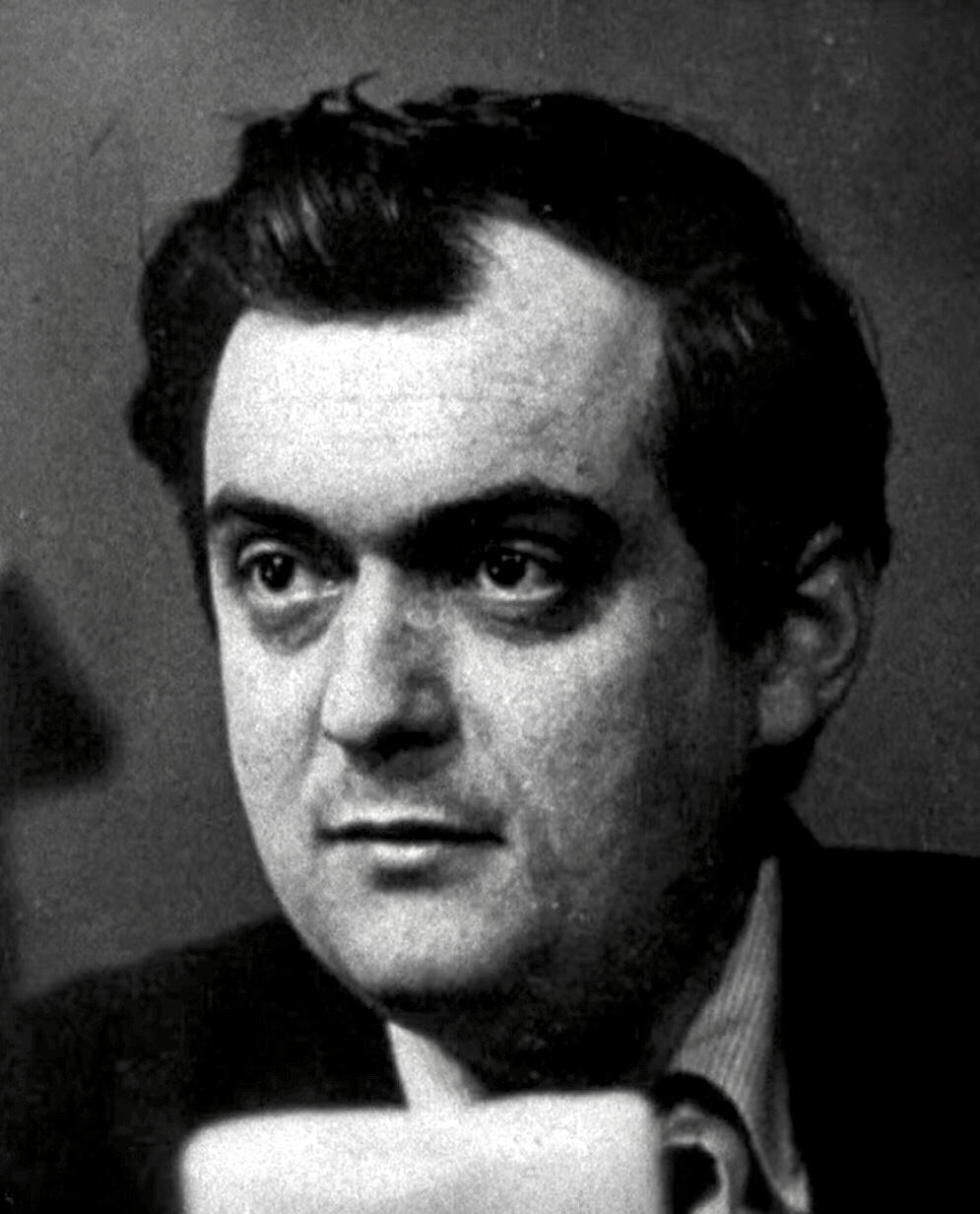
Although Stanley Kubrick's estate declined a request to use his likeness, edited imagery of Kubrick appears in Operation Avalanche via fair use laws.

NASA's public domain archives were used heavily in the film to source 1960s imagery. Johnson was recorded against green screen and composited into 1960s footage of NASA's mission control room and the set of 2001: A Space Odyssey (1968). The 2001 sequence was recreated from still images, as little behind the scenes footage could be found. Certain exterior shots were taken from the National Film Board of Canada film Christopher's Movie Matinée (1968).

Anticipating legal issues related to filming without permits and using copyrighted archival material, Johnson hired lawyer Chris Perez, who had recently worked on the film Escape from Tomorrow (2013) which was shot on location at Disneyland without permits. Stanley Kubrick's estate declined a request to use his likeness in the film, though archival footage of Kubrick appears via liberal application of newly-permissive fair use laws.

=== Camera and post-production process ===
The production began shooting on 16 mm film but soon realized it was unsustainable considering the amount of footage shot. Ultimately Operation Avalanche was shot "about 70/30" on digital video cameras using authentic 1960s lenses.

After editing in Adobe Premiere Pro, the digital footage was transferred onto old 16 mm film stock, chosen as Operation Avalanche incorporates various 16 mm film clips from the 1960s. To give the printed film an authentic worn appearance, sections were hung from a bicycle and ridden around. Other sections of film were stored in a bucket of dirt. Operation Avalanche was colour graded twice; before and after the film printing process.

== Release ==
Operation Avalanche premiered at the Sundance Film Festival on 22 January 2016. Johnson received an offer to premiere the film at the Toronto International Film Festival but declined, reasoning that the film would be lost in the large number of films shown there. Lionsgate obtained US and Canadian rights to the film, and released it in the US on September 16, 2016.

== Reception ==
On the review aggregator website Rotten Tomatoes, 69% of 67 critics' reviews are positive, with an average rating of 6.5/10. Metacritic, which uses a weighted average, assigned the film a score of 69 out of 100, based on 18 critics, indicating "generally favorable" reviews.

Peter Debruge of Variety wrote that the "wild, borderline-illegal stunt delivers big time on its crazy premise." John DeFore of The Hollywood Reporter called it a "likeable if not always convincing fantasy that gets much mileage from its period feel". The Globe and Mail compared the film's car chase sequence to Children of Men (2006), and rated it three-and-a-half out of four stars. Jordan Hoffman of The Guardian rated the film 4 out of 5 stars. Critics noted similarities with The Dirties, particularly in Matt and Owen's dynamic.

Anthony Kaufman of Screen Daily wrote that the film "comes across more as a rambling lark than a tightly conceived film". Mike D'Angelo of The A.V. Club criticised the film's "mundane narrative" and Johnson's performance. He also negatively compared it to the thriller film Capricorn One (1977).

=== Accolades ===
| Award | Year | Category | Recipient(s) | Result | Ref(s) |
|---|---|---|---|---|---|
| Toronto Film Critics Association | 2016 | Best Canadian Film | Matt Johnson | Runner-up | |
| Kingston Canadian Film Festival | 2017 | People's Choice Award | Matt Johnson | Won | |
| Canadian Screen Awards | 2017 | Best Motion Picture | Matthew Miller, Lee Kim and Matt Johnson | Nominated | |
| Canadian Screen Awards | 2017 | Best Director | Matt Johnson | Nominated | |
| Canadian Screen Awards | 2017 | Best Overall Sound | Matt Chan | Nominated | |
| Canadian Screen Awards | 2017 | Best Sound Editing | Matt Chan, James Patrick and Frieda Bay | Nominated | |
| Canadian Screen Awards | 2017 | Best Costume Design | Megan Oppenheimer | Nominated | |
| Canadian Screen Awards | 2017 | Best Visual Effects | Tristan Zerafa | Nominated | |

== See also ==
- Apollo 11 in popular culture
- Moon landing conspiracy theories in popular culture
