= Nirvanna the Band the Show =

Canadian television series

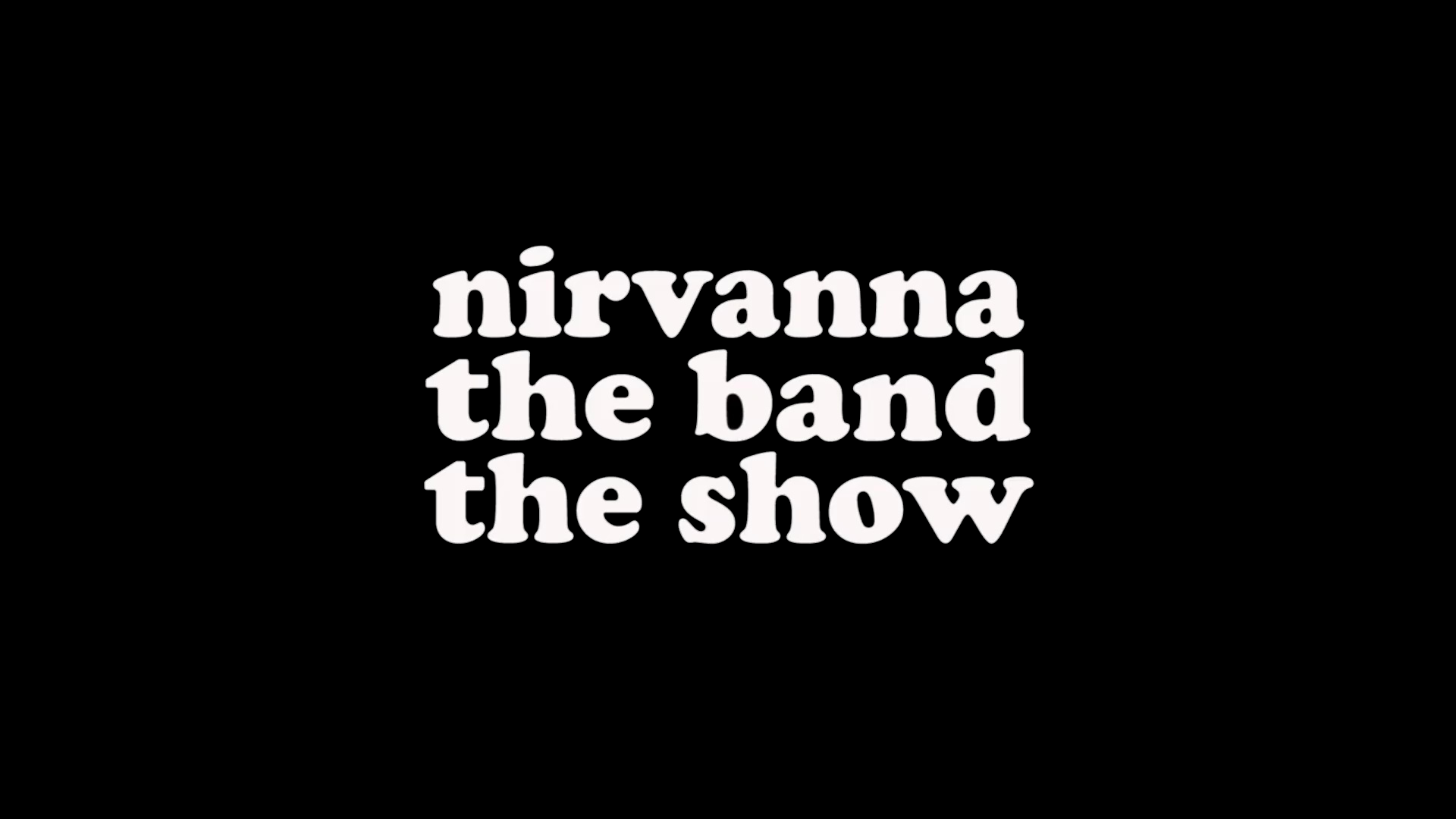
- Genre: Mockumentary; Sitcom; Cringe comedy
- Created by: Matt Johnson; Jay McCarrol
- Based on: Nirvana the Band the Show by: Matt Johnson; Jay McCarrol
- Written by: Andrew Appelle; Robert Hyland; Curt Lobb; Matthew Miller; Matt Johnson; Jay McCarrol; Jared Raab
- Directed by: Matt Johnson
- Starring: Matt Johnson; Jay McCarrol
- Opening theme: Various
- Ending theme: "Army" by Ben Folds Five
- Country of origin: Canada
- Original language: English
- No. of seasons: 2
- No. of episodes: 16

Production
- Executive producers: Matthew Miller; Matt Johnson; Jay McCarrol; Jim Czarnecki; Danny Gabai; Michael Kronish; Spike Jonze; Eddy Moretti; Shane Smith
- Producer: Vicki Lean
- Production locations: Toronto, Ontario
- Cinematography: Jared Raab; Andrew Appelle
- Editors: Robert Hyland; Curt Lobb; Andrew Appelle
- Running time: 22 minutes
- Production companies: Zapruder Films; Rogers Media; Vice Studio Canada

Original release
- Network: Viceland
- Release: 2 February 2017 – 9 February 2018

Related
- Nirvana the Band the Show; Nirvanna the Band the Show the Movie

Nirvanna the Band the Show is a Canadian mockumentary sitcom television series created by Matt Johnson and Jay McCarrol, who co-star as fictionalized versions of themselves. The show is adapted from the web series Nirvana the Band the Show, which was independently produced and released online by Johnson and McCarrol between 2007 and 2009.

It premiered in February 2017 and aired on Viceland for two seasons. A third season was partially produced but remains unaired. A feature film, Nirvanna the Band the Show the Movie, premiered at SXSW on March 9, 2025. Following the shuttering of Viceland, distribution rights to the series were picked up by Neon, who released the film theatrically on February 13, 2026. The series began streaming on Hulu on July 24, 2026.

== Premise ==
The show is about lifelong best friends Matt Johnson and Jay McCarrol, who live together in their home city of Toronto. Together they form "Nirvanna the Band", whose act consists of Jay improvising on piano while Matt does spoken word performances. They engage in a series of complex "plans" intended to land them a gig at the Rivoli, usually involving publicity stunts around Toronto. This is despite the fact that Nirvanna the Band has never actually written or recorded a single song, nor taken any steps to contact the Rivoli's management except for a botched phone call in the first episode.

The show consists of scripted scenes as well as improvisation and candid camera footage of bystanders. Matt and Jay often directly address their cameramen, Jared and Andrew. The show's sense of humor often skews metafictional, and some episodes have plots that coincide directly with events in real life. In the fifth episode, "The Big Time", Matt and Jay's plan involves making a film and sneaking it into Sundance; much of the footage was shot at the actual 2016 Sundance Film Festival premiere of Matt Johnson's real life movie Operation Avalanche. In the same episode, a woman intrudes on a scripted conversation between Matt and Kevin Smith (appearing as himself) and offers Matt alcohol. This inspired a plot element in which Matt's character tries alcohol for the first time and overindulges.

Many episodes include homages to popular culture. Johnson has described the fictional Matt and Jay as being "perpetually stuck in the '90s", and they are often seen playing Nintendo 64 games. In the tenth episode, Matt is intermittently seen watching Mrs. Doubtfire, and he plans multiple separate schemes based on scenes from the movie which he assumes will work in real life. The title sequence, which changes each episode, usually imitates the opening titles of another well-known film or show.

== Cast and characters ==
=== Matt ===
Portrayed by Matt Johnson. Matt is the frontman of Nirvanna the Band, although he does not sing or play any instruments. Matt is very confident, but generally immature and awkward in social situations. He lives in a Queen Street house with Jay and spends his time devising "plans" to get their band a show at the Rivoli. Matt almost always wears a tan suit jacket and trilby.

=== Jay ===
Portrayed by Jay McCarrol. Jay is a talented pianist who is Matt's childhood best friend and roommate. Unlike Matt, he is calm, polite, and insecure; in flashbacks, he often remembers himself as more emotional and harsh than he really was. He tends to naïvely trust Matt and go along with his plans despite his better judgement. A recurring theme of the show is Jay's genuine musical talent being held back by Matt; in "The Buffet", Jay prepares to quit Nirvanna the Band, but is manipulated by Matt into staying.

=== Cinematographers ===
- Jared Raab as Jared (non-speaking role, camera operator)
- Andrew Appelle as Andrew (non-speaking role, camera operator)

== Production ==
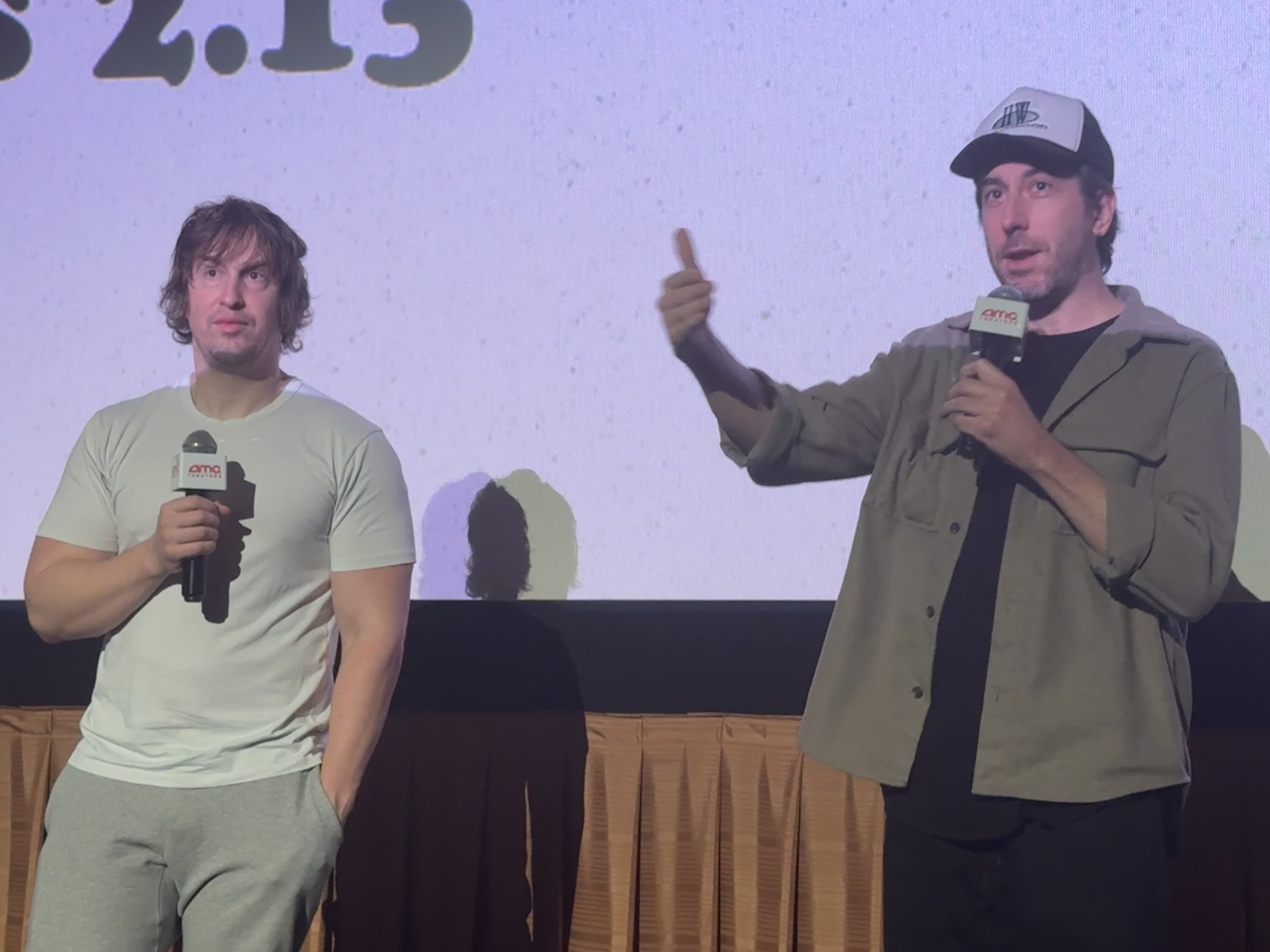
Series creators and stars Matt Johnson and Jay McCarrol in 2026.

Johnson and McCarrol started development of the characters while in high school in Mississauga. Johnson said the characters are influenced by his and McCarrol's real personalities and experiences growing up as best friends in Toronto.

Created as a web series between 2007 and 2009, it was later expanded into a full television series and aired on Viceland. The spelling was changed from Nirvana to Nirvanna at the recommendation of a lawyer.

The series premiered on 2 February 2017, and aired for two seasons until 8 February 2018. Three episodes were also screened at the 2016 Toronto International Film Festival as part of its Primetime program of television projects. The series was originally announced in 2016 as slated to air on City, but was later shifted to Viceland with City airing only the first episode as a preview special. The second season has not been picked up for broadcast outside of Canada, however was previously available for streaming in Australia via SBS On Demand, and in the United Kingdom via Channel 4's on demand service, along with other Viceland shows.

A third season was filmed and partially edited but never released, as Viceland Canada shut down as a network before the season could be finished. Zapruder Films purchased the rights to the show, and intend to finish and release the third season when they are finished with the feature film. The third season’s trailer was screened in November 2026, with a release date yet to be announced.

In August 2019, CBC Television officially acquired Nirvanna the Band the Show from Viceland and began airing the series, alongside streaming on CBC Gem.

In July 2026, it was announced that the series would begin streaming on Hulu in the U.S. on 24 July 2026, and on Disney+ in Canada on 7 August 2026. In September 2026, Neon unveiled a Blu-ray box set of the series along with Nirvanna the Band the Show the Movie, marking the first time the show had been officially released on physical media, that was expected to ship in late December.

== Episodes ==
Series	Episodes	Originally released	
Series	Episodes	First released	Last released
1	8	2 February 2017	23 March 2017
2	8	27 October 2017	9 February 2018

=== Season 1 (2017) ===
No. overall	No. in season	Title	Directed by	Written by	Original release date	US viewers (millions)
1	1	"The Banner"	Matt Johnson	Andrew Appelle, Robert Hyland, Curt Lobb, Jay McCarrol, Matthew Miller, Jared Raab	2 February 2017	0.063
Amateur Toronto musicians Matt Johnson and Jay McCarrol want to get their band, Nirvanna the Band, a show at a local venue called the Rivoli. They try calling the Rivoli's manager, who informs them that he needs evidence their band exists. They get their picture taken at Sears, and after failing to deliver it to the Rivoli, they decide to have it blown up into a large banner that they drape over the building across the street. After unfurling the banner, they realize that Jay's pants ripped during the shoot and his penis is visible on the poster. Panicking, they try to paint over the penis with wood varnish, but accidentally draw an arrow pointing right at it. Jay gives Matt a cigarette to calm his nerves, but he accidentally lights the paint roller on fire and burns the banner. Opening Title: Nirvana the Band the Show
2	2	"The Booking"	Matt Johnson	Andrew Appelle, Robert Hyland, Curt Lobb, Jay McCarrol, Matthew Miller, Jared Raab	9 February 2017	0.053
Matt and Jay devise a plan to place a listing in NOW Magazine advertising a Nirvanna the Band show at the Rivoli. Matt distracts a Rivoli waiter while Jay covertly takes the club's phone and calls them, but they abandon the plan when the waiter makes note of Matt's strange behavior. They discover that NOW has mistaken them for Nirvana, so Matt disguises himself as a phone company worker and calls the Rivoli from NOW's offices, only for Jay, stationed outside, to realize he still has the Rivoli's phone, which he accidentally breaks. Matt believes their plan to be a success until Jay is forced to reveal the truth to him, but his spirits are boosted when a passerby declares them "in." Opening Title: Growing Pains
3	3	"The Bean"	Matt Johnson	Andrew Appelle, Robert Hyland, Curt Lobb, Jay McCarrol, Matthew Miller, Jared Raab	16 February 2017	0.038
Matt and Jay have their first taste of coffee while trying to find materials for a Nirvanna the Band Christmas parade float, leading them to stay up all night during its creation. Matt sends Jay to get a Baby Jesus figurine for the float, accidentally frightening him with the legend of the "Queen Street Strangler" and chasing him with a neighbor's truck while trying to get his attention. The two realize they have stayed up all night and are late for the parade, but find that it has already started and cannot get in. Despite this, they still manage to entertain passers-by and have a good time, and Jay gives Matt the original Star Wars trilogy on VHS, which he has never seen before. Opening Title: Home Alone
4	4	"The Blindside"	Matt Johnson	Andrew Appelle, Robert Hyland, Curt Lobb, Jay McCarrol, Matthew Miller, Jared Raab	23 February 2017	0.042
Matt goes temporarily blind after he marathons Star Wars and sits directly in front of the television, ruining Jay's plan to take him to see the Force Awakens premiere. When Matt reveals he ordered a Han Solo costume to wear for the showing, Jay decides to take the costume for himself and give the unsuspecting Matt a shoddy costume. The two argue with a pair of fans when Jay tries to describe the film's visuals for Matt, getting all of them thrown out of the theater, and Matt storms off heartbroken when he realizes Jay's deception. The fans corner Jay, but Matt returns in a Daredevil costume and fights them off, only to get hit by a car while trying to chase after them. Jay reveals to Matt in the hospital that one of their cameramen filmed the entirety of The Force Awakens, and describes the movie to him as Matt listens attentively. Opening Title: Daredevil
5	5	"The Big Time"	Matt Johnson	Andrew Appelle, Robert Hyland, Curt Lobb, Jay McCarrol, Matthew Miller, Jared Raab	2 March 2017	N/A
After Matt is thrown out of a school for trying to film his movie, Operation Avalanche, without permission, Jay criticizes his constant use of deception in his plans, angering him. He secretly cuts Jay's part almost entirely and claims he got the film into the Sundance Film Festival. They travel to Park City, where Matt sneaks the film into the festival lineup and gains huge success because of it, and he publicly denounces Jay during interviews. As Jay wanders the city dejected, Matt gets his first taste of alcohol and Jay soon finds him passed out on the street just as the festival calls Matt's phone. Jay pretends to be Matt at Operation Avalanche's official premiere until Matt shows up, who realizes the hurt he has caused Jay and invites him to introduce the movie together until they realize that audiences hate it. Opening Title: Entourage
6	6	"The Boy"	Matt Johnson	Andrew Appelle, Robert Hyland, Curt Lobb, Jay McCarrol, Matthew Miller, Jared Raab	9 March 2017	N/A
Matt and Jay devise a plan to find a child in the Make-A-Wish Foundation, befriend them, and use their wish to get a show at the Rivoli. They find a boy named Mike at the local hospital and sneak him out, taking him to Canada's Wonderland against Jay's wishes. Jay realizes his aversion to the park is based on a trauma from his childhood, which he overcomes and starts having fun with Matt and Mike until the latter collapses. Matt and Jay leave him at the hospital's entrance and run, only to realize he was diabetic and had a reaction to the sugary food they were buying for him, and decide to never talk to him again now that he cannot help them. Opening Title: Crank
7	7	"The Buffet"	Matt Johnson	Andrew Appelle, Robert Hyland, Curt Lobb, Jay McCarrol, Matthew Miller, Jared Raab	16 March 2017	N/A
Jay writes Matt a letter informing him that he has become disillusioned with his schemes and plans to quit the band, ready to read it to him over their Canada Day dinner at a Mandarin Restaurant. Matt's dawdling and a series of strange events involving friendship occur, culminating when the two get fortune cookies that end up having matching messages about friendship. Jay decides to not read the letter, only for Matt, now wanting it, to fight him for it, causing them to get ejected from the restaurant. Matt takes the letter and runs outside with it, only to tear it up and hug Jay. As they watch fireworks together, a series of flashbacks reveals that Matt secretly read the letter and orchestrated all the events in order to get Jay to stay in the band. Opening Title: My Dinner with Andre
8	8	"The Bank"	Matt Johnson	Andrew Appelle, Robert Hyland, Curt Lobb, Jay McCarrol, Matthew Miller, Jared Raab	23 March 2017	N/A
Matt 3D prints a gun in hopes of intimidating the Rivoli into letting Nirvanna the Band play a show, but is waylaid by Jay's overdue VHS tapes he borrowed from the library and stops at a bank to get money. While they use the bathroom in the basement, robbers break in and take everyone else hostage, only to accidentally kill each other when Matt tries to attack them with the fake gun. As the police arrive, Matt poses as a robber and begins "killing" the disguised robber's corpses while making increasingly ludicrous demands, only to lower it to Nirvanna the Band getting to play a show at the Rivoli. Jay, terrified that he will be implicated, kills Matt and disguises himself as a hostage to leave the building safely, only to reveal that he and Matt faked his death with the last robber's body so they could both escape. Closing titles reveal that Matt and Jay did not receive a call from the Rivoli. Opening Title: Dog Day Afternoon

=== Season 2 (2017–18) ===
No. overall	No. in season	Title	Directed by	Written by	Original release date	US viewers (millions)
9	1	"The Burger"	Matt Johnson	Andrew Appelle, Robert Hyland, Curt Lobb, Jay McCarrol, Matthew Miller, Jared Raab	8 December 2017	N/A
Matt devises a plan to get on the Toronto Maple Leafs' kiss cam, where he and Jay will kiss as a publicity stunt and use it to get Nirvanna the Band popularity. Jay, doubting the plan's success, proposes a different one that involves him learning improv and discovers that he has a natural talent for it, while a dejected Matt goes to Wahlburgers. When Jay returns and asks to go back to the kissing plan while Matt eats, he becomes convinced that the burgers have magical properties. Using their improv skills to get selected for the kiss cam, Matt and Jay watch as a gay couple gets chosen before them and the crowd reacts positively, while Matt vomits on camera because of the burgers, getting them thrown out of the game. In a closing narration, Matt promises that he will not keep any more secrets from Jay. Opening Title: Wahlburgers
10	2	"The Boost"	Matt Johnson	Andrew Appelle, Robert Hyland, Curt Lobb, Jay McCarrol, Matthew Miller, Jared Raab	10 November 2017	N/A
While out buying cold medicine for Jay, Matt notices a GoldenEye 007 speedrun tournament poster that promises a spot on the "Rival1" podcast, which he misreads as "Rivoli". He tricks Jay, who has an aversion to all drugs, into taking the medicine by claiming it is candy, resulting in him taking the entire box. To counteract Jay's exhaustion, Matt convinces him to take speed, allowing him to perform well at the tournament. Matt cuts an opponent's RCA cables when Jay stops to take more speed, and he wins, but overdoses when he ends up eating the entire jar, refusing to forgive Matt in the hospital. Opening Title: GoldenEye 007
11	3	"The Buddy"	Matt Johnson	Andrew Appelle, Robert Hyland, Curt Lobb, Jay McCarrol, Matthew Miller, Jared Raab	3 November 2017	N/A
Jay abandons Matt's latest plan to network at a party, while Matt sulks at home and watches Mrs. Doubtfire, getting the idea to disguise himself as a man named "Tony" and befriend Jay. It works, and he subtly convinces him to do Matt's plan in the Rivoli's restaurant. Jay insists that Tony come along, forcing Matt to constantly switch between disguises, during which Jay insults him when he believes he is ruining "Tony's" plan. Angry, Matt tells Jay as Tony that he is abandoning him, leading Jay to realize the hurt he caused Matt by leaving him to go to the party. Matt begins choking on his food and Jay saves his life with the Heimlich maneuver, causing his disguise to come off in the process. Matt and Jay silently forgive each other and leave. Opening Title: Mrs. Doubtfire
12	4	"The Book"	Matt Johnson	Andrew Appelle, Robert Hyland, Curt Lobb, Jay McCarrol, Matthew Miller, Jared Raab	27 October 2017	N/A
On Halloween night, Matt goes out to trick-or-treat while Jay stays home to clean, where he finds a foreboding music book hidden in a vent. He plays a song from it on the piano just as Matt returns, shrinking him down to an inch tall and forcing him to avoid the hazards of Matt cleaning the house. Matt eventually finds him and plays a song from the book, which restores Jay's size but switches their bodies. When Jay plays another song to fix things, they accidentally summon the hunter from Jumanji, who almost kills Matt until Jay plays another song, making the hunter vanish and switching them back. Jay turns into a werewolf, which Matt decides to use to get a show at the Rivoli. This works until Jay is shot and killed by the hunter and turns back into a human. The episode is not canon in the show's universe, as it does not open with the numbered title card that the other episodes of the series have. Opening Title: "Treehouse of Horror"
13	5	"The B-Day"	Matt Johnson	Andrew Appelle, Robert Hyland, Curt Lobb, Jay McCarrol, Matthew Miller, Jared Raab	17 November 2017	N/A
Matt forgets Jay's April 20th birthday and drags him downtown to get him a gift. They split up so Matt can get Jay food, but Jay gets lost and Matt's snacks are stolen by a crowd of stoners. Hungry, Jay eats a drugged brownie and goes on a trek throughout the city, where he realizes what is truly important to him is getting Nirvanna the Band a show at the Rivoli. At the same time, Matt buys Jay a new outfit but realizes he was only shopping for himself, deciding to get them a Rivoli show as a present. When a Rivoli worker asks for clarification of them being a band, Matt mishears as them being banned and leaves in horror just as Jay returns home. Matt tells him that nothing is wrong and chooses to put on a black trilby as opposed to his signature white one. Opening Title: The Walking Dead
14	6	"The Banned"	Matt Johnson	Andrew Appelle, Robert Hyland, Curt Lobb, Jay McCarrol, Matthew Miller, Jared Raab	24 November 2017	N/A
Desperate to conceal the news of their "banning" from the Rivoli from Jay, Matt devises a plan to hack into their system with the help of electronics store employee Ned and get them off the "banned list," which Jay believes is the "band list." Believing they will be ejected from the Rivoli if they enter, Matt has Ned go in their stead and print out an important looking email on the Rivoli's computer, which is actually a message meant to inform the workers that sewer maintenance is being done under them. When Ned points out that Matt was about to admit to lying to Jay, Matt declares this the last episode they will be doing with him. Opening Title: Hackers
15	7	"The Band List"	Matt Johnson	Andrew Appelle, Robert Hyland, Curt Lobb, Jay McCarrol, Matthew Miller, Jared Raab	9 February 2018	N/A
In a flashback to Matt's childhood, he tries to sneak into the Rivoli through a band's equipment, and is given the leader's white trilby as a sign of respect when he is caught. In the present, Matt and Jay steal a map of Toronto's subway system from the Royal Ontario Museum, narrowly escaping security into the train tunnels. They survive an oncoming train by breaking into the sewer lines, where Jay admits he is losing confidence in Matt because of his repeated failures. Matt again almost admits the truth about the "banned" list, but they are distracted when they hear a drummer who is always outside the Rivoli, meaning they are directly under it. They find a basement entrance and end up in their back room, where Jay accidentally alerts staff members while trying to steal a list of performing bands, forcing them to flee to the roof. Opening Title: Indiana Jones and the Last Crusade
16	8	"The Banned List 2" "The Betrayal"	Matt Johnson	Andrew Appelle, Robert Hyland, Curt Lobb, Jay McCarrol, Matthew Miller, Jared Raab	12 January 2018	N/A
Flashbacks reveal that Jay met someone who offered him a job during the party in "The Buddy" and that he called them to set up an interview in "The B-Day" and "The Banned", which is scheduled for the current day. Matt and Jay break open the roof's AC unit with a knife they steal using a magnet and pull out its wires. A repairman comes and leaves his ladder behind, only for Matt to stop Jay from leaving, finally admitting the truth about his strange behavior. Jay is baffled as to why Matt would hide this from him and brushes it off, but reveals that he is going to his interview. Enraged that Jay is abandoning him, Matt eventually gives in and halfheartedly bids him luck, and Jay leaves him on the roof alone.

== Critical reception ==
The series has received mostly positive reviews. Jake Howell of The Globe and Mail praised the show, commenting "Bickering like a married couple, Matt and Jay's constant back-and-forth enabling, backstabbing and belittling of each other has thus far made for great television."

== Film ==
In April 2023, Johnson announced that his next film project would be a film based on the series. Nirvanna the Band the Show the Movie began principal photography in 2023, and premiered at SXSW on March 9, 2025. It was subsequently released theatrically in Canada and the United States on February 13, 2026.

== Online video collaborations ==
In September 2023, and again in September 2024, Matt and Jay appeared in special shorts for 64X, an online event run by comedy troupe Mega64. The event was based on a fictional convention called 64X, for which Matt and Jay are supposed to "do the voices"; the shorts consist of Matt recording loudspeaker announcements for the faux convention with piano accompaniment from Jay. Johnson has said that the style of Mega64's early videos inspired the format of Nirvanna the Band the Show.

Following the release of Nirvanna the Band the Show the Movie, the duo collaborated with YouTuber Joel Haver in a video called "Nirvanna the Band Tries to Get an Animation Made".

== Accolades ==
Award	Year	Category	Recipient(s)	Result	Ref(s)
Canadian Screen Awards	2018	Best Comedy Series		Nominated	
Canadian Screen Awards	2018	Editing in a comedy program or series (for "The Bean")	Robert Hyland, Curt Lobb	Nominated	
Canadian Screen Awards	2018	Best Writing, Comedy (for "The Bean")	Andrew Appelle, Robert Hyland, Curt Lobb, Jay McCarrol, Matthew Miller, Jared Raab	Nominated	
Canadian Screen Awards	2019	Best Writing, Comedy (for "The Book")	Andrew Appelle, Robert Hyland, Curt Lobb, Jay McCarrol, Matthew Miller, Jared Raab	Nominated	
