= Jared Raab =

Canadian writer and filmmaker

- Born: Millbrook, Ontario
- Education: York University
- Occupation: Cinematographer
- Years active: 2007–present
- Known for: Nirvanna the Band the Show; BlackBerry; Nirvanna the Band the Show the Movie

Jared Raab is a Canadian writer and cinematographer, best known for his collaborations with Matt Johnson on the television series Nirvanna the Band the Show and the films BlackBerry, Operation Avalanche, The Dirties, and Nirvanna the Band the Show the Movie.

== Early life and education ==
Originally from Millbrook, Ontario, Raab studied film at York University.

== Career ==
Raab made a number of short films before breaking through to wider attention with his 2011 short The Revenge Plot, which won the Fan Favorite award at the 2011 RBC Emerging Filmmakers Competition. For a number of years thereafter he was a director of music videos for artists such as Born Ruffians, Arkells, Ohbijou, Diamond Rings, PS I Love You, Snailhouse, Young Rival and Fast Romantics. He received two Prism Prize nominations as a director of music videos, in 2017 for July Talk's "Picturing Love" and in 2021 for Andy Shauf's "Clove Cigarette".

He was cinematographer on Matt Johnson's films The Dirties and Operation Avalanche prior to Johnson and Jay McCarrol creating Nirvanna the Band the Show, for which Raab was both a cinematographer and one of the writers.

He is a two-time Canadian Screen Award nominee for Best Writing in a Comedy Series for Nirvanna the Band the Show, receiving nods at the 6th Canadian Screen Awards in 2018 for "The Bean" and at the 7th Canadian Screen Awards in 2019 for "The Book", and a nominee for Best Direction in a Documentary Series at the 10th Canadian Screen Awards in 2022 for This Is Pop.

He won the award for Best Cinematography at the 12th Canadian Screen Awards in 2024, for BlackBerry.

In 2025, Raab was credited as cinematographer for Nirvanna the Band the Show the Movie. The film began principal photography in 2023 and premiered in 2025 at SXSW.

== Filmography ==
=== Acting ===
Year	Title	Role	Notes
2009	Spyware	Boy #2	
2016	Operation Avalanche	Jared	Fictionalised version of himself
2017–2018	Nirvanna the Band the Show	Jared	Fictionalised version of himself
2025	Nirvanna the Band the Show the Movie	Jared	Fictionalised version of himself

=== Behind-the-scenes ===
Year	Title	Cinematographer	Director	Writer	Producer	Notes
2007–2010	Nirvana the Band the Show	No	No	No	Yes	11 episodes; also camera operator (1 episode)
2013	The Dirties	Yes	No	No	Yes	
2016	Operation Avalanche	Yes	No	No	Co-producer	
2017–2018	Nirvanna the Band the Show	Yes	No	Yes	Co-executive producer	
2020–2022	Cursed Films	Yes	No	No	No	
2021	For Heaven's Sake	Yes	No	No	No	
2021	This Is Pop	No	Yes	No	No	2 episodes; also visual effects artist
2021	V/H/S/94	Yes	No	No	No	Segment: "Storm Drain"
2022	We're All Gonna Die (Even Jay Baruchel)	Yes	No	No	No	6 episodes
2023	BlackBerry	Yes	No	No	Associate	Also camera operator
2024	Any Other Way: The Jackie Shane Story	No	Animation co-director	No	No	
2025	Nirvanna the Band the Show the Movie	Yes	No	Story	Executive	
2025	Middle Life	Yes	No	No	Yes	Also visual effects
2026	The Betrayers	Yes	No	No	No	

=== Music videos ===
Year	Title	Song	Artist
2010	"What To Say"	Born Ruffians	Director
2010	"Nova-Leigh"	Born Ruffians	Director
2011	"Whistleblower"	Arkells	Director
2011	"Niagara"	Ohbijou	Director
2011	"Sudden Dark Truths"	Marine Dreams	Director and producer
2012	"I'm Just Me"	Diamond Rings	Director
2012	"Saskatoon"	PS I Love You	Director and cinematographer
2013	"I Never Woke Up"	Snailhouse	Director and cinematographer
2013	"For from Me"	Decades	Director
2014	"Hot Tonight"	Tokyo Police Club	Director and cinematographer
2014	"Come to Light"	Arkells	Director
2015	"Death of Gold"	Spencer Burton	Cinematographer
2015	"Things You Want"	Find the Others	Director and cinematographer
2015	"Don't Live Up"	Born Ruffians	Director
2016	"Beck + Call"	July Talk	Director
2016	"Picturing Love"	July Talk	Director
2017	"Dreams Tonite"	Alvvays	Cinematographer
2021	"C-Thru"	Suuns	Director
2022	"I Am Water"	July Talk	Director and cinematographer
