= The Dirties =

- Theatrical release poster
- Directed by: Matt Johnson
- Screenplay by: Matt Johnson; Evan Morgan
- Story by: Josh Boles
- Produced by: Matt Johnson; Matthew Miller; Evan Morgan; Jared Raab
- Starring: Matt Johnson; Owen Williams; Krista Madison
- Cinematography: Jared Raab
- Edited by: Matt Johnson; Evan Morgan
- Music by: Jay McCarrol
- Distributed by: Phase 4 Films; Kevin Smith Movie Club
- Release dates: January 19, 2013 (Slamdance); October 4, 2013
- Running time: 83 minutes
- Country: Canada
- Language: English
- Budget: $10,000

The Dirties is a 2013 Canadian found footage comedy-drama film produced, co-edited and directed by Matt Johnson, from a script he wrote with Evan Morgan. Filmed in a documentary style, the film meshes reality and fiction into a bleak narrative of two bullied high school students (Johnson and Owen Williams).

== Plot ==
High school students Matt Johnson and Owen Williams are making a film project (The Dirties) about a gang of bullies and the revenge that two victimized students take on them.

Matt and Owen are openly bullied at their school by Josh and other bullies that the boys call the dirties. Following it, Matt tries to conduct interviews with several students and staff members around school about what students should do if they are being bullied. The students realize that getting help is much more difficult than the faculty members perceive it to be. Matt and Owen later edit clips together for their film, during which it is revealed that popular girl, Chrissy H., had a crush on Owen in grade three. While shooting more scenes, Matt has Owen attempt to look cool in front of Chrissy to see if she still likes him.

After finishing filming, the rough cut of Matt and Owen's The Dirties is brought to the film teacher, Mr. Muldoon. The movie is revealed to contain the two boys shooting and killing other students, as well as their teacher, in addition to containing a large amount of expletives. Muldoon demands the film be changed, much to the dismay of Matt.

The very next day, the re-cut version of the film is shown in class. Matt leaves in humiliation while Owen puts his head down as the rest of the class talks and laughs through the movie. On their walk home from school, Owen has a rock thrown at his head by two of the Dirties from school. Later at Matt's house while Owen is icing his head, Matt fantastically suggests that the movie would have been better if the two had actually shot the Dirties within their film, only with real guns.

Moving forward with his plan, Matt erases the script for The Dirties from his whiteboard, and begins working on The Dirties II. Owen practices the guitar in his attempts to impress Chrissy. Back at school, the boys are bullied during gym class and in the locker room. Matt then acquires blueprints of his high school from the library, masquerading his plan with a "school project." At home he unfurls them and exclaims about how easy it was to procure the blueprints, not even being asked for his school ID. We cut back to school, when Owen has a lunch dumped on him and is slapped across the face by another student after Owen accidentally bumps into him during their lunch period.

The boys go out at night and create a bonfire, discussing which of the Dirties at their school they want to keep an eye on. Matt measures the lockers and takes photos, which Owen sees as suspicious. Matt says that it is entirely inconspicuous, and goes so far as to tell Chrissy that they're planning a school shooting. Chrissy takes it as a joke, and afterwards, gives Matt her number for Owen. That night, Owen calls Chrissy and says he is at a party, at Matt's suggestion.

As Owen and Chrissy's relationship picks up, Owen goes to Matt for more help on how to get closer with her. Matt says he can't help until the following week, since he's going to a cottage to fire guns. Owen decides to invite himself along, and the two fire guns at milk jugs, melons, and a propane tank bomb. Following it, they conduct a plan to bake Chrissy a cake. When Owen shares it with her, Matt gets upset that Owen accidentally shared it with the Dirties themselves.

Matt is seen reading Columbine, and checks out six copies of Catcher in the Rye "to seem crazy." Owen becomes concerned about Matt displaying his plans and pinning up pictures of people he plans to shoot around his basement. Later, Matt and Owen are at a cliffside: Matt is practicing martial arts moves on the ledge, and making jokes about him falling and dying, putting up a "persona" that Owen hates. Owen vents his frustration of Matt's constant obsession with acting out movie scenes and his inability to let his guard down and be a real person. Matt walks off angrily, saying that he's never acting.

Days later at home, Matt self-diagnoses himself as a psychopath, which he glorifies as he reads Columbine. Their friendship deteriorates as Matt becomes aggravated with Owen communicating with Chrissy and becoming more social—while Owen becomes fed up with Matt's erratic and antisocial behavior—leading to an argument between the two. Matt indignantly says that Chrissy does not care about him and that she exists in Owen's life because of "his plans", but Owen takes a firm stand and asserts that Matt is jealous of him because he has no other friends and that he's a pussy. Matt and Owen shove each other around (off screen), which leads to Owen taking off his wireless microphone, leaving Matt standing alone in the basement.

Matt comes up from the basement, asking his mother if she thinks he is crazy. She responds, laughing, saying that crazy technically means that someone loses their ability to tell their thoughts from reality and the real world. Matt goes, alone, to the place where he and Owen had the bonfire, where he now sits, watching all of his notebooks burn. Later while Matt is editing the end credits for The Dirties, he's interrupted by a phone call from Owen, which he ignores.

In the end stretch of the film, Matt goes to the school with a duffel bag full of his cousin's firearms, entering through a stairwell. He looks at the floor plan one final time, walks down the hallways, rehearses the scene, then sets up cameras around the lockers to capture everything. Once the bell has rung, Matt walks up to Josh, shooting both him and Jackman. After, Matt spots Owen down the hallway, and chases after him. Matt enters a classroom where Owen is cornered trying to open a locked door, Matt asks, "What are you doing? It's me!"

== Cast ==
- Matt Johnson as Matt
- Owen Williams as Owen
- Krista Madison as Chrissy H.
- Brandon Wickens as Jackman
- Jay McCarrol as Mr. Bird
- Josh Boles as Boozy
- Shailene Garnett as Krissy B.
- Alen Delain as Alan
- Paul Daniel Ayotte as Laren
- Padraig Singal as Boy in Park 1
- David Matheson as Mr. Muldoon

== Production ==
The Dirties is full of references to pre-existing films, books, and other media. Originally, the film had a production budget of $10,000; after finishing production, an additional $45,000 was needed to secure licensing rights for the music used in the film. All the film's financing came "out of pocket".

Scenes of the film were shot non-chronologically, and had to be re-shot because of copyright and budgeting issues. In the scene where Matt places a plastic bag over his head, the original company logo on the bag caused too much of a stir when it came to securing rights; in the scene where Matt and Owen watch a movie at a sleepover, they had to edit the television screen out due to the price of The Bourne Identity being visible in their film.

Due to the low budget of the film and the independent production, almost all of the costumes in the film were taken from Matt Johnson and Owen Williams' personal closets. Several of the costumes in the film are the same costumes Matt wears for his character in Nirvana the Band the Show. References to the show were also made within the film, such as the "Malkovich" scene, where Owen sits at a piano. In the in-character commentary for The Dirties, Matt Johnson (playing his highschool character within the movie), directly references the webseries' influence on the in-universe short film: "...that's a reference to Nirvana the Band the Show, which is an internet show," creating a cinematic universe between the two.

While the movie had a rough beat sheet written before production, there was almost no scripted dialogue, and no shooting script. Scenes indoors around students were filmed at different high school through the Toronto and Peterborough areas. Several of the scenes, such as the one in the chemistry classroom or in the gymnasium, were shot without some of the participants' awareness. The school's real students were informed they were being filmed for a movie, but were not told the film's plot or who the crew members and actors were; the film's cast and crew posed as real-life students enrolled in those particular schools to avoid blowing their cover. The film's ending, however, was staged in a different school that was rented over a weekend, and was shot using informed cast members.

== Queer themes and narratives ==
Since the film's release on DVD, several commentary tracks were recorded with the cast and crew of the film. During one of the recordings, Matt Johnson touched on the themes of the film—most notably queer subtext within it. Several scenes, such when Matt is dressed as a girl, allude to the subtext Boles and Johnson gave to the characters. Along with the explicit discussions of Owen and Matt's homoeroticism, there's also hints of transexuality—seen within the same scene.

Matt: "If I was the last woman in the world..." Owen: "You'd still be a man."

== Music ==
The film's music consists of an original score by Jay McCarrol, longtime collaborator with Matt Johnson, though includes music from pre-existing films (Being John Malkovich), as well as its own soundtrack. Music for the film was arranged by David Hayman.

- "When I'm With You" , performed by Best Coast, lyrics by Bobb Bruno and Bethany Cosentino
- "Orson Welles", by Jay McCarrol
- "Chrissy's Theme (I Like Guns)", by Jay McCarrol
- 'Big Bully Blues (Campfire Version)", by Jay McCarrol
- "Puppet Love" by Carter Burwell, from the film Being John Malkovich
- "Free Medicine" (Lake of Stew cover), performed by Kate Macdonald and Janelle Blanchard, written by Richard Rigby, Mike Rigby, Brad Levia, Daniel McKell, Julia Narveson, and Dina Cindric
- "Apex", by Adamski
- "Pursuit of Happiness" (Kid Cudi cover), performed by Lissie, written by Kid Cudi, Evan Mast, and Mike Stroud
- "Tinfoil", performed by Limblifter, written by Ryan Dhale, Kurt Dahle, and Ian Michael Somers
- "It's Possible (In Mcelligot's Pool)", written by Stephen Flaherty, Lynn Ahrens, and Theo Seuss Geisel
- "Bloodsucker", performed by Singapore
- "Don't Tell Me", performed by Tigs, written by Alicia 'Tig' Huertas

== Release ==
The Dirties held its world premiere on January 19, 2013, at Slamdance Film Festival. In May, it was acquired by Phase 4 Films for its theatrical release, and Kevin Smith Movie Club for VOD. It opened on October 4, 2013, at the TIFF Bell Lightbox theater in Toronto, with limited screenings in New York and Los Angeles alongside a simultaneous digital release.

Following the film's end credits (remaking pre-existing movie credits, replacing previous cast/crew names with those apart of The Dirties), alternate-cover discs of the film were released—including Rosemary's Baby, The Conversation, and Anatomy of a Murder, along with others. Limited releases were made for the Rivoli release party.

In 2025, the film received a special edition Blu-ray from Umbrella Entertainment, including new special features, art cards, and a replica shirt.

== Reception ==
The film received an 81% "fresh" rating on Rotten Tomatoes based on 36 reviews. The website's consensus reads, "The Dirties uses likable characters and a surprisingly twisted story to deconstruct the power of violent revenge -- and the audience's expectations when viewing it."

On Metacritic, based on reviews from 14 critics, the film has a 65/100 rating, indicating "generally favorable reviews". The Toronto Star called The Dirties "a fresh, compelling take on bullying," rating it three stars out of four. The Globe and Mail called it "a bravura debut for an up-and-coming Canadian filmmaker," also rating it three stars out of four.

The film also received positive reviews from The Huffington Post and Twitch Film.

On a 2010 episode Late Night in the Bedroom, Matt brings up the new movie he's working on (The Dirties), and the subject matter it follows. Afterwards, he laughs, saying "I heard somebody just say 'Jesus, that's awful,'" in response to his description of a 'school shooting documentary.' While the film generally earned positive feedback for its experimental process and new take on the subject, the choice of subject matter and general attitude of the film (montaging between casual violence and Matt's plans to him and Owen having fun themselves) earned it the occasional mixed critic review, as seen in The Guardian.

=== Accolades ===
It has received praise from critics as well as numerous awards, including the Grand Jury Prize for Best Narrative at the 2013 Slamdance Film Festival. The film was a finalist for Best Canadian Film at the Toronto Film Critics Association Awards 2013, alongside Gabrielle and the eventual winner, Watermark.
