= Viceland (Canada) =

Former Canadian pay television channel

- Country: Canada
- Broadcast area: Nationwide
- Headquarters: Toronto, Ontario

Programming
- Picture format: 1080i HDTV (downscaled to letterboxed 480i for the SDTV feed)

Ownership
- Owner: Rogers Media (70%); Vice Media Canada (30%); (Vice Network Canada, Inc.)

History
- Launched: September 7, 2001; 25 years ago
- Closed: March 31, 2018; 8 years ago
- Former names: The Biography Channel Canada (2001–2016)

Viceland was a Canadian pay television channel. It was owned by Vice Network Canada, Inc., which was owned by Rogers Media with minority ownership by Vice Media. It was a Canadian version of Viceland, broadcasting lifestyle-oriented documentary and reality series aimed towards a young adult demographic.

The network was originally established as a Canadian version of the U.S. network The Biography Channel, as a joint venture between Rogers, Shaw Communications, and A&E Networks. Shaw and A&E later sold their shares to Rogers. As part of a larger licensing agreement with A&E Networks, Shaw launched a Canadian version of Biography Channel's successor in the U.S., FYI, in 2014.

On November 5, 2015, Rogers announced that it had partnered with Vice to be the Canadian launch partner for its new television brand Viceland, which replaced H2 in the U.S. as part of a similar joint venture with A&E. Vice Media acquired a 30% minority stake in the Canadian network. After low viewership and profitability, Rogers and Vice announced the termination of the partnership, and the complete shutdown of the channel effective March 31, 2018.

== History ==
=== As The Biography Channel ===
First The Biography Channel logo used from 2001 to 2008.

Second and final The Biography Channel logo used from 2008 to 2016.

Licensed as The Biography Channel by the Canadian Radio-television and Telecommunications Commission (CRTC) on November 24, 2000; the channel was launched on September 7, 2001 as a joint venture between Rogers Media (33.34%), Shaw Communications (33.33%) and A&E Networks (33.33%)—who owned the network's American counterpart. In 2006, both Shaw and A&E sold their interests in the channel to Rogers. The U.S. Biography Channel relaunched as FYI on July 7, 2014; Shaw's Twist TV became a Canadian version of FYI on September 1, 2014.

=== As Viceland ===
On November 5, 2015, Rogers announced that it would serve as the Canadian partner for Viceland, a new millennial-focused channel programmed by Vice Media, and that The Biography Channel would be rebranded to Viceland. Vice Media had partnered with A&E Networks (who owns 10% of the company) to launch Viceland in the U.S. as a replacement for H2.

Rogers and Vice Media had already begun to collaborate in October 2014, when Vice announced a CDN$100 million joint venture with Rogers to build a studio in Toronto's Liberty Village neighbourhood for producing original content. Rogers also announced an intent to launch Vice-branded television and digital properties in Canada in 2015. Rogers CEO Guy Laurence described the proposed studio as "a powerhouse for Canadian digital content focused on 18- to 34-year-olds" which would be "exciting" and "provocative". In 2015, Rogers-owned television network City introduced Vice on City—an anthology series featuring short-form content produced by Vice's Canadian reporters. Vice Media was originally established in Montreal, but had moved to New York City due to difficulties in reaching a sufficient scale in Canada at the time. The company believed that Rogers' investment in Vice helped to better achieve these goals.

Pre-launch programming for Viceland began at 5:00 a.m. ET on February 29, 2016 with Bar Talk, an hour-long special featuring Vice Canada's head of content Patrick McGuire, followed by a countdown to the official launch later in the day.

In November 2017, The Globe and Mail reported that Rogers intended to cease providing funding to Viceland in early 2018, citing inside reports of low viewership and unprofitability. Representatives of both companies declined to comment. On January 22, 2018, Rogers and Vice jointly announced a termination of their partnership. The channel shut down on March 31, 2018, and its licence was revoked by request of Vice Network Canada on April 1. Immediately after that, the channel space that was created by The Biography Channel in 2001 simply ceased to exist. Vice will inherit complete ownership of the Toronto studio. Several small providers replaced it with FX, giving it wider distribution.

On August 16, 2018, Vice announced a long-term output deal with Bell Media. Viceland was not relaunched, but the new deal saw its content dispersed across some Bell-owned services such as MTV, Much, and Crave.

== Programming ==
Vice co-founder Suroosh Alvi stated that Viceland would view its Canadian productions as being of global interest, as opposed to a regulatory obligation of little interest of non-Canadians; one-third of the network's first slate of original programming was produced in Canada, including Cyberwar and Dead Set on Life. Rogers also contributed original programming, such as the scripted comedies Nirvanna the Band the Show and Fubar Age of Computer.

== See also ==
- The Biography Channel (UK and Ireland)
- Bio (Australian TV channel)
