= This Is Pop (TV series) =

2021 Canadian television series

This Is Pop is a Canadian documentary television series, which aired on CTV Television Network in 2021. Produced by Banger Films and similar to the format of the company's earlier documentary series Metal Evolution, Rock Icons and Hip-Hop Evolution, the eight-episode series presents a history of pop music.

The series was designed thematically rather than chronologically, so that episodes could be viewed in any order; when the series was added to Netflix for international distribution, it was designed so that whichever episode the service's algorithms deemed most likely to be of interest to each individual viewer was recommended first.

The series premiered March 6, 2021 on CTV, and was released internationally by Netflix in June.

The series received two Canadian Screen Award nominations at the 10th Canadian Screen Awards in 2022, for Best Biography or Arts Documentary and Best Direction in a Documentary Series (Jared Raab for "Auto-Tune").

== Episodes ==
No.	Title	Directed by	Original release date
1	"Auto-Tune"	Jared Raab	March 6, 2021
2	"Hail Britpop!"	Reginald Harkema	March 13, 2021
3	"Stockholm Syndrome"	Jared Raab	March 20, 2021
4	"The Boyz II Men Effect"	Chelsea McMullan	March 27, 2021
5	"When Country Goes Pop"	Simon Ennis	April 3, 2021
6	"The Brill Building in 4 Songs"	Chelsea McMullan	April 10, 2021
7	"What Can a Song Do?"	Lisa Rideout	April 17, 2021
8	"Festival Rising"	Dylan Reibling	April 24, 2021
