= Evan Morgan (filmmaker) =

Canadian filmmaker and screenwriter

Evan Morgan is a Canadian filmmaker and screenwriter. He is most noted for his 2020 film The Kid Detective, for which he was a Canadian Screen Award nominee for Best Original Screenplay at the 9th Canadian Screen Awards in 2021.

Morgan was previously credited as a writer and producer of Matt Johnson's 2013 film The Dirties, and as writer of Sol Friedman's 2014 animated short Day 40. He wrote and directed the short films The Pedestrian Jar (2011) and A Pretty Funny Story (2012), and directed July Talk's music video for "The Garden".
