= Curt Lobb =

Canadian film editor

Curt Lobb is a Canadian film editor.

== Career ==
Lobb is most noted for his work on the 2023 film BlackBerry, for which he won the Canadian Screen Award for Best Editing at the 12th Canadian Screen Awards in 2024.

He was previously part of the production team who created the television series Nirvanna the Band the Show, and has had credits on the television series The Beaverton, This Is Pop and Dark Side of the Ring, and the films The Kid Detective and I Used to Be Funny.
