= List of Canadian films of 1998 =

This is a list of Canadian films which were released in 1998:

Title	Director	Cast	Genre	Notes
2 Seconds	Manon Briand	Charlotte Laurier, Dino Tavarone, Suzanne Clément, Louise Forestier, André Brassard	Drama	
Air Bud: Golden Receiver	Richard Martin	Kevin Zegers, Cynthia Stevenson	Family film	Made with U.S. financing
Airspeed	Robert Tinnell	Elisha Cuthbert, Joe Mantegna	Drama	Made for TV
The Assistant	Daniel Petrie	Gil Bellows, Armin Mueller-Stahl, Joan Plowright, Kate Greenhouse, Jaimz Woolvett	Drama	Canada-U.K. co-production
August 32nd on Earth (Un 32 août sur terre)	Denis Villeneuve	Pascale Bussières, Alexis Martin, Serge Thériault	Drama	Denis Villeneuve's first feature was screened at the 1998 Cannes Film Festival; Prix Jutra – Actor (Martin)
Barney's Great Adventure	Steve Gomer		Comedy	
Boy Meets Girl	Jerry Ciccoritti	Kate Nelligan, Sean Astin, Emily Hampshire, Joe Mantegna	Romantic comedy	Nominated for Writers Guild of Canada Top Ten Award
Les Boys II	Louis Saia	Marc Messier, Rémy Girard, Patrick Huard, Serge Thériault, Paul Houde	Comedy	Golden Reel Award
Clutch	Chris Grismer	David Hewlett, Tanya Allen, Carlo Rota, Tom Green	Crime comedy	
Conquest	Piers Haggarad	Lothaire Bluteau, Tara FitzGerald, Monique Mercure, David Fox, Eugene Lipinski	Drama with a touch of magic realism	Genie Award – Supporting Actress (Mercure); Canada-U.K. co-production
The Countess of Baton Rouge (La Comtesse de Bâton Rouge)	André Forcier	Robin Aubert, Geneviève Brouillette, Isabel Richer	Comedy, drama	
Dancing on the Moon	Kit Hood	Natalie Vansier, Michael Yarmush, Elisha Cuthbert, Dorothée Berryman	Family film	Canada-Czech co-production
Dirty	Bruce Sweeney	Tom Scholte, Babz Chula, Benjamin Ratner, Nancy Sivak, Vincent Gale	Drama	
Dog Park	Bruce McCulloch	Luke Wilson, Kathleen Robertson, Natasha Henstridge, Janeane Garofalo, Bruce McCulloch, Mark McKinney	Comedy	Genie Award – Supporting Actor (McKinney)
The Eleventh Child (Nguol thùa)	Dai Sijie		Drama	
Elimination Dance	Bruce McDonald, Don McKellar, Michael Ondaatje	Don McKellar, Tracy Wright, Michael Turner	Short drama	
The Escape	Stuart Gillard	Patrick Dempsey	Action, drama	Made for TV
Extraordinary Visitor	John W. Doyle	Raoul Bhaneja, Mary Walsh, Andy Jones	Comedy	
The Falling	Raul Sanchez Inglis	Christopher Shyer, Nicole Oliver, Rob Lee	Drama	
The Fishing Trip	Amnon Buchbinder	Jhene Erwin, Melissa Hood, Anna Henry	Drama	
Frank the Wrabbit	John Weldon	Paul Hecht	Animated short	
The Ghosts of Dickens' Past	Bruce Neibaur	Christopher Heyerdahl, Ralph Allison, Jennifer Bertram	Biography drama	
The Grace of God	Gerald L'Ecuyer	Michael Riley, Steve Cumyn, David Cronenberg	Docudrama	
The Hairy Bird also known as Strike!	Sarah Kernochan	Kirsten Dunst, Gaby Hoffmann, Lynn Redgrave	Comedy	Canada-Italy co-production
Heart of the Sun	Francis Damberger	Christianne Hirt, Shaun Johnston, Michael Riley	Drama	
The Herd	Peter Lynch	Colm Feore, James Allodi, Graham Greene, David Hemblen, Doug Lennox, Don McKellar, Mark McKinney	Documentary	
Hollywoodism: Jews, Movies and the American Dream	Simcha Jacobovici	Documentary		
It's Your Turn, Laura Cadieux (C't'à ton tour, Laura Cadieux)	Denise Filiatrault	Ginette Reno, Pierrette Robitaille	Comedy, drama	Adaptation of the novel by Michel Tremblay
Jack and Jill	John Kalangis	John Kalangis, Shauna MacDonald, Kathryn Zenna	Romantic comedy	
Jerry and Tom	Saul Rubinek	Joe Mantegna, Sam Rockwell, Maury Chaykin, Ted Danson, Charles Durning	Black comedy	Made with U.S. financing
Joe's Wedding	Michael Kennedy	D.W. Moffett, Kate Vernon, Tammy Isbell	Drama	
Julie and Me (Revoir Julie)	Jeanne Crépeau	Dominique Leduc, Stephanie Morgenstern	Drama	
Kayla	Nicholas Kendall	Tod Fennell, Bronwen Booth, Henry Czerny, Meredith Henderson	Drama	
Last Night	Don McKellar	Don McKellar, Sandra Oh, Geneviève Bujold, David Cronenberg, Callum Keith Rennie	Drama	Canada-France co-production
Let It Come Down: The Life of Paul Bowles	Jennifer Baichwal	Paul Bowles	Documentary	
Loss of Faith	Allan A. Goldstein	John Ritter, Sophie Lorain, Daphne Zuniga	Drama mystery thriller	
Ludovic: The Snow Gift	Co Hoedeman	Sonja Ball	Animated short	
Magical Words (Les Mots magiques)	Jean-Marc Vallée	Richard Robitaille, Robert Gravel	Short drama	
Meanwhile (Pendant ce temps...)	Ghyslaine Côté	Carmen Ferlan, Gérard Poirier, Ghyslaine Côté, Catherine Pépin, Jocelyne Zucco, Ronald Houle, Huguette Oligny, David Boutin, Rachel Fontaine	Short suspense drama	First Prize, Stony Brook and Cabbagetown; nominated for a Prix Jutra and a Genie Award in the Best Short Film category
Moving Day	Chris Deacon	Michael McMurtry, Brigitte Gall	Short comedy	
Mr. Aiello (La Déroute)	Paul Tana	Tony Nardi, Barbara-Michèle Pelletier	Drama	
My Dog Vincent	Michael McGowan	Chuck Campbell, Zehra Leverman	Coming-of-age drama	
Nô	Robert Lepage	Anne-Marie Cadieux, Marie Gignac	Drama	
Now or Never (Aujourd'hui ou jamais)	Jean Pierre Lefebvre	Marcel Sabourin, Claude Blanchard, Julie Ménard, Jean-Pierre Ronfard, Micheline Lanctôt	Drama	
A Place Called Chiapas	Nettie Wild		Documentary co-produced with National Film Board	Genie Award - Feature documentary; about the Zapatista Army of National Liberation revolt in southern Mexico
The Prince of Egypt	Brenda Chapman, Steve Hickner, Simon Wells	Val Kilmer, Ralph Fiennes, Michelle Pfeiffer, Sandra Bullock, Jeff Goldblum, Danny Glover, Patrick Stewart, Helen Mirren, Steve Martin, Martin Short	Animated musical drama	Canada-U.S. co-production
Quest for the Lost Tribes	Simcha Jacobovici		Documentary	
The Real Howard Spitz	Vadim Jean	Kelsey Grammer, Amanda Donohoe, Geneviève Tessier, Patrick McKenna	Comedy	
The Red Violin (Le Violon rouge)	François Girard	Samuel L. Jackson, Greta Scacchi, Jason Flemyng, Sylvia Chang, Don McKellar, Carlo Cecchi, Christoph Koncz	Drama	Canada-U.K.-Italy-Austria co-production
Rupert's Land	Jonathan Tammuz	Samuel West, Ian Tracey, George Wendt	Comedy	
Shadow Maker: Gwendolyn MacEwen, Poet	Brenda Longfellow	Gwendolyn MacEwen (subject), Linda Griffiths (narrator)	Documentary	
Streetheart (Le cœur au poing)	Charles Binamé	Pascale Montpetit, Anne-Marie Cadieux, Guy Nadon, Guylaine Tremblay	Drama	Prix Jutra – Actress (Montpetit), Supporting Actress (Cadieux)
Such a Long Journey	Sturla Gunnarsson	Roshan Seth, Soni Razdan, Om Puri, Ranjit Chowdhry	Drama based on the novel by Rohinton Mistry	Genie Award – Actor (Seth), Editing, Sound Editing; Canada-U.K. co-production
Summer of the Monkeys	Michael Anderson	Michael Ontkean, Leslie Hope, Wilford Brimley, Corey Sevier, Don Francks	Family film made for Disney	Direct to DVD
Sunrise over Tiananmen Square	Shui-Bo Wang		Short co-produced with the National Film Board	Academy Award nominee
This Is My Father	Paul Quinn	Aidan Quinn, James Caan, Stephen Rea, John Cusack	Family drama	Canada-Ireland co-production
We're Funny That Way!	David Adkin	Scott Capurro, Maggie Cassella, Kate Clinton, Lea DeLaria, Elvira Kurt, Bob Smith	Documentary	Made for TV
When I Will Be Gone (L'Âge de braise)	Jacques Leduc	Annie Girardot, Pascale Bussières	Drama	
When Ponds Freeze Over	Mary Lewis	Mary Lewis, Andy Jones, James Allodi, Eva Crocker	Mixed animation/live action short	Genie Award – Live-Action Short; TIFF – Best Canadian Short
Whoever Dies, Dies in Pain (Quiconque meurt, meurt à douleur)	Robert Morin		Drama	
You Can Thank Me Later	Shimon Dotan	Ellen Burstyn, Amanda Plummer	Comedy drama	

== See also ==
- 1998 in Canada
- 1998 in Canadian television
