= Vancouver Film Critics Circle Award for Best British Columbia Film =

Canadian film award

The Vancouver Film Critics Circle presents an award for Best British Columbia Film as part of its annual critics awards program, honouring the best films made within the Canadian province of British Columbia within the previous year.

== Winners ==
=== 2000s ===
Year	Film	Director(s)	Ref.
2005	It's All Gone Pete Tong	Michael Dowse	
2005	Eve and the Fire Horse	Julia Kwan	
2005	A Simple Curve	Aubrey Nealon	
2006	Fido	Andrew Currie	
2006	Everything's Gone Green	Paul Fox	
2006	Mount Pleasant	Ross Weber	
2006	Unnatural & Accidental	Carl Bessai	
2007	American Venus	Bruce Sweeney	
2007	Confessions of an Innocent Man	David Paperny	
2007	The Union: The Business Behind Getting High	Brett Harvey	
2008	Fifty Dead Men Walking	Kari Skogland	
2008	Edison and Leo	Neil Burns	
2008	Stone of Destiny	Charles Martin Smith	
2009	Facing Ali	Pete McCormack	
2009	Excited	Bruce Sweeney	
2009	A Shine of Rainbows	Vic Sarin	

=== 2010s ===
Year	Film	Director(s)	Ref.
2010	Fathers & Sons	Carl Bessai	
2010	Force of Nature: The David Suzuki Movie	Sturla Gunnarsson	
2010	Mighty Jerome	Charles Officer	
2011	People of a Feather	Joel Heath	
2011	Daydream Nation	Michael Goldbach	
2011	Sisters & Brothers	Carl Bessai	
2012	Beyond the Black Rainbow	Panos Cosmatos	
2012	Becoming Redwood	Jesse James Miller	
2012	Camera Shy	Mark Sawers	
2012	Random Acts of Romance	Katrin Bowen	
2013	Down River	Benjamin Ratner	
2013	Oil Sands Karaoke	Charles Wilkinson	
2013	When I Walk	Jason DaSilva	
2014	Violent	Andrew Huculiak	
2014	Everything Will Be	Julia Kwan	
2014	Preggoland	Jacob Tierney	
2015	Haida Gwaii: On the Edge of the World	Charles Wilkinson	
2015	Eadweard	Josh Epstein, Kyle Rideout	
2015	No Men Beyond This Point	Mark Sawers	
2016	Hello Destroyer	Kevan Funk	
2016	Aim for the Roses	John Bolton	
2016	Koneline: Our Land Beautiful	Nettie Wild	
2016	Window Horses	Ann Marie Fleming	
2017	Never Steady, Never Still	Kathleen Hepburn	
2017	Gregoire	Cody Bown	
2017	Luk'Luk'I	Wayne Wapeemukwa	
2017	The Road Forward	Marie Clements	
2018	Edge of the Knife	Gwaai Edenshaw, Helen Haig-Brown	
2018	N.O.N.	Zebulon Zang	
2018	This Mountain Life	Grant Baldwin	
2018	When the Storm Fades	Seán Devlin	
2019	The Body Remembers When the World Broke Open	Kathleen Hepburn, Elle-Máijá Tailfeathers	
2019	Because We Are Girls	Baljit Sangra	
2019	Raf	Harry Cepka	

=== 2020s ===
Year	Film	Director(s)	Ref.
2020	Chained	Titus Heckel	
2020	Brother, I Cry	Jessie Anthony	
2020	The New Corporation: The Unfortunately Necessary Sequel	Jennifer Abbott, Joel Bakan	
2021	Portraits from a Fire	Trevor Mack	
2021	Be Still	Elizabeth Lazebnik	
2021	Someone Like Me	Steve J. Adams, Sean Horlor	
2022	Riceboy Sleeps	Anthony Shim	
2022	Doug and the Slugs and Me	Teresa Alfield	
2022	Until Branches Bend	Sophie Jarvis	
2023	Seagrass	Meredith Hama-Brown	
2023	Float	Sherren Lee	
2023	I'm Just Here for the Riot	Kathleen Jayme, Asia Youngman	
2023	WaaPaKe	Jules Arita Koostachin	
2024	Can I Get a Witness?	Ann Marie Fleming	
2024	Ari's Theme	Nathan Drillot, Jeff Lee Petry	
2024	The Chef and the Daruma	Mads K. Baekkevold	
2025	Foreigner	Ava Maria Safai	
2025	Blue Heron	Sophy Romvari	
2025	Forward	Nic Collar	
