= Jillian Fargey =

Canadian actress

Jillian Fargey is a Canadian actress from Vancouver, British Columbia. She is most noted for her performance in the 2000 film Protection, for which she received a Genie Award nomination for Best Actress at the 22nd Genie Awards.

== Career ==
Fargey is predominantly a stage actress in Vancouver. She is a three-time Jessie Richardson Theatre Award winner, including Best Ensemble with Dmitry Chepovetsky and Michael Northey for their work in Mark Leiren-Young's Basically Good Kids, Best Actress in 1999 for her performance in George F. Walker's Problem Child, and Best Actress (Small Theatre) in 2020 for her performance in Florian Zeller's The Father.

== Filmography ==
=== Film ===
| Year | Title | Role | Notes |
|---|---|---|---|
| 1999 | Daydrift | Sam | |
| 2000 | Life-Size | Ellen | |
| 2000 | Protection | Betty | |
| 2001 | Kill Me Later | Bank Customer | |
| 2001 | Last Wedding | Record Company Assistant | |
| 2005 | The Hamster Cage | Lucy | |
| 2006 | Mount Pleasant | Marya | |
| 2007 | The Green Chain | Jenni Holm | |
| 2009 | Case 39 | Foster Mom | Uncredited |
| 2009 | Excited | Technician | |
| 2011 | The Odds | Mrs. Gardeski | |
| 2012 | Crimes of Mike Recket | Gillian Recket | |
| 2013 | The Dick Knost Show | Claire | |
| 2014 | Way of the Wicked | Elizabeth | |
| 2014 | Jingle All the Way 2 | Betsy | |
| 2018 | The Miracle Season | Ellyn Found | |
| 2018 | Kingsway | Carol | |
| 2023 | She Talks to Strangers | Susan | |

=== Television ===
| Year | Title | Role | Notes |
|---|---|---|---|
| 1987 | The Beachcombers | Keana | Episode: "By the Pricking of My Thumbs" |
| 1991 | Max Glick | Hungry Onion flower artist | Episode: "Odd Couple" |
| 1997 | The X-Files | Kaye Schilling | Episode: "Never Again" |
| 1998 | The Net | Etta Waverly | Episode: "Harvest" |
| 1998, 2004 | Da Vinci's Inquest | Lee Anne / Mrs. Moore | 2 episodes |
| 1999 | Zenon: Girl of the 21st Century | Reporter | Television film |
| 2000 | Cold Squad | Frances Wyland | Episode: "Life After Death" |
| 2000 | Seven Days | Jamie | Episode: "The Cure" |
| 2000 | Frankie & Hazel | Millicent Ferrar | Television film |
| 2001 | The Heart Department | Mark's Sister | Television film |
| 2002 | Breaking News | Mary Corsette | Episode: "Victims" |
| 2002 | The Twilight Zone | Kristina | Episode: "Cradle of Darkness" |
| 2003 | Tru Calling | Diane | Episode: "Putting Out Fires" |
| 2004 | Jeremiah | Teacher | Episode: "Interregnum: Part 1" |
| 2005 | Terminal City | Tiarra | 2 episodes |
| 2005 | The Dead Zone | Soccer Mom #2 | Episode: "A Very Dead Zone Christmas" |
| 2006 | The Collector | Beatrice | Episode: "The Watchmaker" |
| 2006 | Saved | Mandy's Mom | Episode: "Fog" |
| 2006 | The Secrets of Comfort House | Beth | Television film |
| 2007 | Perfect Child | Diane | Television film |
| 2007 | It Was One of Us | Rachel | Television film |
| 2009 | Eureka | Dr. Ashe | Episode: "You Don't Know Jack" |
| 2009 | The Killing | Donna Cantwell | Episode: "Stonewalled" |
| 2013–2017 | Bates Motel | Maggie Summers | Recurring role, 5 episodes |
| 2014 | A Ring by Spring | Elizabeth | Television film |
| 2015 | Just the Way You Are | Spa Therapist | Television film |
| 2015 | Supernatural | Deb | Episode: "Out of the Darkness, Into the Fire" |
| 2016 | iZombie | Mrs. Parisi | Episode: "The Whopper" |
| 2016 | The Romeo Section | Sketchy Woman | Episode: "Rising Tide" |
| 2016 | Shut Eye | Claire Gilbert | 2 episodes |
| 2016–2017 | Murder, She Baked | Sophie Bascomb | 3 episodes |
| 2017 | Once Upon a Time | Fairy Godmother | Episode: "Hyperion Heights" |
| 2017, 2018 | Van Helsing | Ella Harker | 2 episodes |
| 2018 | Altered Carbon | Mrs. Henchy | Episode: "Fallen Angel" |
| 2018 | Life Sentence | Tamara French | Episode: "Clinical Trial and Error" |
| 2018 | Take Two | Kay Winston | Episode: "Stillwater" |
| 2018 | The Man in the High Castle | Gladys | Episode: "Sabra" |
| 2019 | The Chronicle Mysteries | Antonetta DeSavio | Episode: "Recovered" |
| 2019 | Unspeakable | Alice's Therapist | Episode: "Intent (1997 – 2005)" |
| 2019 | Holiday Hearts | Jaycee Canaday | Television film |
| 2020, 2022 | Motherland: Fort Salem | May Craven | 3 episodes |
| 2021 | A Million Little Things | Dr. Reeves | 2 episodes |
