= Babz Chula =

American actress

- Born: Barbara Ellen Zuckerman; March 22, 1947; Springfield, Massachusetts, U.S.
- Died: May 7, 2010 (aged 63); Vancouver, British Columbia, Canada
- Occupations: Actress, musician
- Years active: 1984–2010
- Spouse: Larry Lynn

Babz Chula (born as Barbara Ellen Zuckerman; March 22, 1947 – May 7, 2010) was an American-born Canadian actress and musician.

== Early life, education and career ==
Barbara Ellen Zuckerman was born in Springfield, Massachusetts but spent her early childhood in the working-class neighbourhood of Jamaica, Queens County, New York City. Her widowed mother, Abby Zuckerman, a booking agent for Leonard Bernstein, moved her with two young children, first to Hawaii and then to California, to pursue work in the entertainment field after Chula's father, Larry Zuckerman, an auto mechanic and stock-car racer, was killed in a car race.

Growing up in Los Angeles, she won a scholarship to the California Institute of the Arts and returned to New York after graduation to perform as a folk singer. In 1971, she and her first husband, Phillip Ciulla, relocated to Slocan Valley in British Columbia before moving to Vancouver, where she resumed her acting and singing career as Babz Chula, under the respelled phonetic pronunciation of Ciulla. Her first major supporting role was in Sandy Wilson's award-winning film My American Cousin.

== Personal life and death ==
Chula was married to Larry Lynn.

The 2013 National Film Board of Canada documentary Chi follows Chula to Kerala, India in 2010, where she travels in an effort to treat her 6-year battle with cancer. Directed by Anne Wheeler, the documentary follows Chula's battle with cancer until the end, detailing Chula and her family members' struggle to come to terms with her death, while celebrating her life and accomplishments.

== Selected filmography ==
Year	Title	Role	Director
1984	Runaway	Construction Foreperson (as Babs Chulla)	Michael Crichton
1985	My American Cousin	Dolly Walker	Sandy Wilson
1988	The Accused	Woman Lawyer	Jonathan Kaplan
1989	In Search of the Last Good Man	Unknown	Peg Campbell
1989	American Boyfriends	Dolly, Butch's Mother	Sandy Wilson
1989	Immediate Family	Birthday Girl's Mom	Jonathan Kaplan
1989	Cousins	Mrs. Davidow	Joel Schumacher
1991	Run	Poker Player (as Babs Chula)	Geoff Burrowes
1992	The Date	Carmen's mother	Niko Theodosakis
1992	North of Pittsburgh	Linda	Richard Martin
1994	Valentine's Day	Barb	Mike Hoolboom
1994	Kanada	Charlie	Mike Hoolboom
1995	Live Bait	Helen MacIntosh	Bruce Sweeney
1995	The Love Charm	Unknown	Robert Rondau
1995	Power of Attorney	Angela	Howard Himelstein
1995	A Pyromaniac's Love Story	Ass pincher's wife	Josh Brand
1997	Silent Cradle	Cye Block	Paul Ziller
1997	Barbeque...A Love Story	Unknown	Stacey Kirk
1997	The Ex	Dr. Lillian Jonas	Mark Leste
1998	Dirty	Angie	Bruce Sweeney
1999	Double Jeopardy	Ruby	Bruce Beresford
2000	No More Monkeys Jumpin' on the Bed	Rick's Mother	Ross Weber
2001	Last Wedding	Bobbie	Bruce Sweeney
2002	Cheats	Mrs. Rosengarden	Andrew Gurland
2002	Bitten	Mother	Clauida Morgado
2003	Little Brother of War	Police Lieutenant	Damon Vignale
2003	Moving Malcolm	Gisha	Benjamin Ratner
2004	Kathleen's Closet	Kathleen	Sheila Jordon
2004	Gang of Love	Unknown	Rick Dobran
2004	Seven Times Lucky	Eddie	Gary Yates
2004	Croon	Unknown	Hillary Jones-Farrow
2006	Home by Christmas	Rita	Gail Harvey
2006	The French Guy	Elizabeth Murray	Ann Marie Fleming
2006	The Saddest Boy in the World	Dr. Judith D'Angelo	Jamie Travis
2006	The Secret	Psychiatrist	Vincent Perez
2006	Criminal Intent	Ruth	George Erchbamer
2007	American Venus	Peggy	Bruce Sweeney
2008	The X-Files: I Want to Believe	Surgeon	Chris Carter
2009	Mothers & Daughters	Micki	Carl Bessai
2013	Kids in Jail	Herself (posthumous)	Larry Lynn
2013	Chi	Herself (posthumous)	Anne Wheeler

== Selected minor films ==
- 2002: Croon as Liz
- 2000: Becoming Dick as Waitress
- 2000: Wednesday Woman as Andrea Glissner
- 1999: Sweetwater as Rita
- 1997: Jitters as Mrs. Hoffman
- 1997: Intensity as Mrs. John Q. (Citizen)
- 1997: Seduction in a Small Town as Jesse Pence
- 1997: Echo as Caseworker
- 1996: For Hope as Doctor
- 1994: Roommates as Norma
- 1994: My Name is Kate as Nora
- 1993: Without a Kiss Goodbye as Unknown
- 1993: Double, Double, Toil and Trouble as Madame Lulu
- 1993: When a Stranger Calls Back as Agent
- 1986: Mrs. Delafield Wants to Marry as Frieda

== Selected television appearances ==
- 1991: The Commish – 6 episodes
- 1993–1996: Madison – 8 episodes
- 1998: Police Academy – 1 episode
- 2000–2003: Cold Squad – 1 episode
- 1999–2001 These Arms of Mine – 5 episodes
- 2002: Bliss – 1 episode
- 2002: John Doe – 1 episode
- 2004: The L Word – 1 episode
- 2004: The Days – 3 episodes
- 2007: Final 24 – 1 episode

== Voice work ==
- Adventures of Sonic the Hedgehog
- Captain N: The Game Master
- Madeline
- Captain Zed and the Zee Zone
- Legend of the Hawaiian Slammers
- G.I. Joe
- Bucky O'Hare and the Toad Wars
- Yvon of the Yukon
- Camp Candy
- Toon of the Month
- Little Witch
- Action Man
- Christopher the Christmas Tree
- Littlest Pet Shop
- Funky Fables
- Super Trolls

== Recognition ==
- 2009: Leo Award Best Lead Performance by a Female in a Feature Length Drama
- 2008: Sam Payne Award
- 2006: Leo Award for Individual Outstanding Achievement
- 2002: Best supporting Actress New York Independent Film Festival (Bitten)
- 2001: Gemini Award for Best Actress in a Dramatic Series
- 1999/2002: Leo Awards Nomination "Best Performance by a Female/Picture"
- 1996: Leo Award Winner "Best Actress"
- 1996: Woman of the Year by Woman in Film and Video
- 1995–1996: Jessie Award Outstanding Performance by an Actress in a Supporting Role
- 1992–1993: Jessie Award Outstanding Ensemble Cast
