= Chi (2013 film) =

- Directed by: Anne Wheeler
- Produced by: Yves J. Ma
- Starring: Babz Chula
- Distributed by: National Film Board of Canada
- Release date: 2013
- Country: Canada

Chi is a 2013 National Film Board of Canada documentary film by Anne Wheeler about Vancouver actress Babz Chula and her death from cancer. Part of the film was shot at an ayurvedic clinic in Kerala, India, where Chula had travelled for cancer treatment in 2010.

The idea to make a film about her story first occurred to Wheeler when she cast Chula, already diagnosed with cancer in real life, as a cancer patient who dispenses philosophical advice in her 2008 TV movie, Living Out Loud. When Wheeler and Chula worked together again the following year on Carl Bessai's film Fathers & Sons, Chula shared the story of a patient she'd met at a chemotherapy who credited her recovery to treatment in India. Wheeler, who had spent considerable time in India, decided to accompany Chula on her search for a cure.

The film had its world premiere in April 2013 at the Hot Docs Canadian International Documentary Festival. On March 9, 2014, Chi was named best short documentary film at the Canadian Screen Awards.
