= Manoj Sood =

Canadian actor (born 1952)

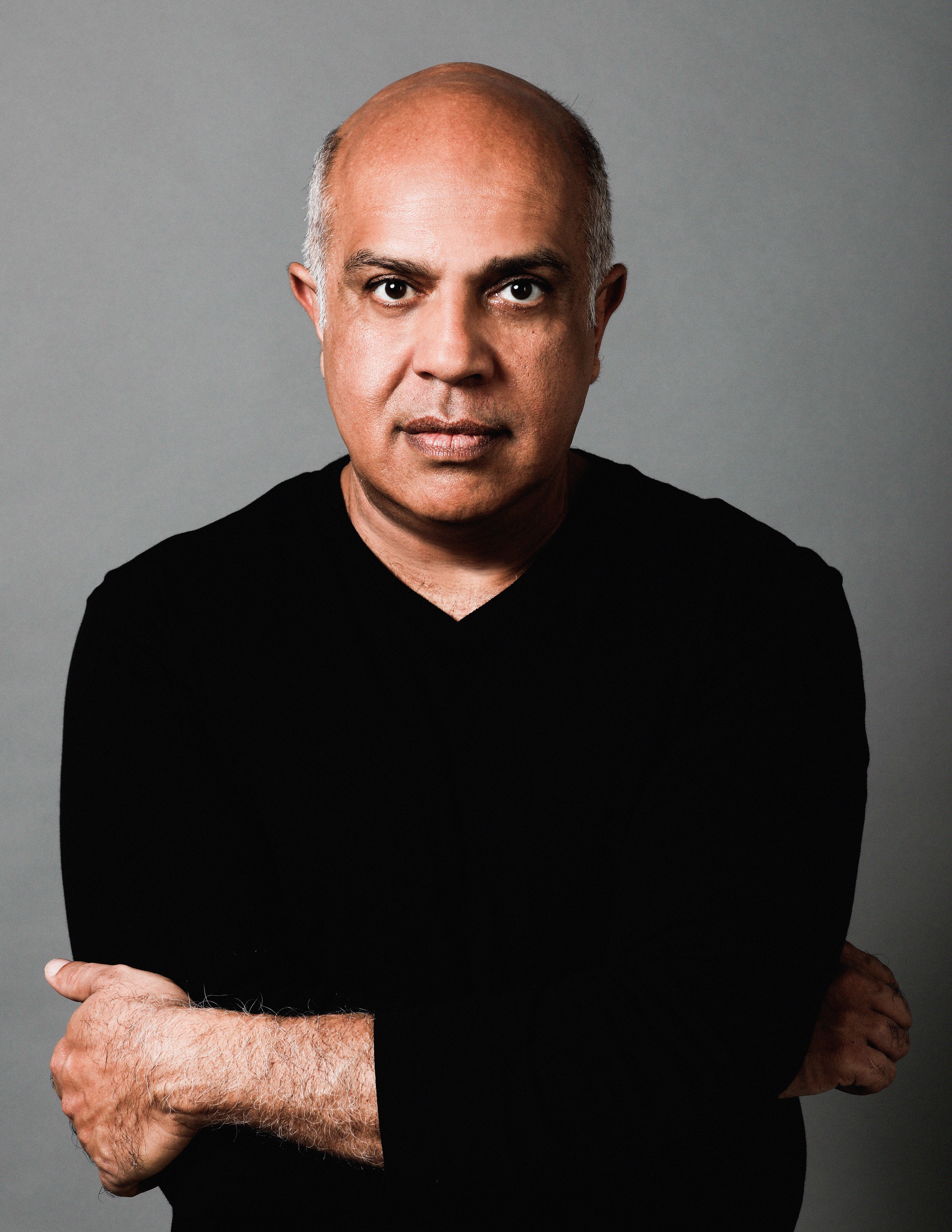
- Born: May 5, 1962 (age 64); Mombasa, Kenya
- Occupation: Actor
- Years active: 1995–present
- Agent(s): The Characters Talent Agency, Vancouver, BC, Canada
- Relatives: Veena Sood (sister); Ashwin Sood (cousin)
- Website: manojsood.net

Manoj Sood (born May 5, 1962) is a Canadian film and television actor.

== Life and career ==
Manoj Sood was born in Mombasa, Kenya, to Indian Hindu parents, Dr. B.K. Sood and Narindar Sood.

He immigrated with his family to Canada in 1964, growing up in Calgary before studying film at St. Michaels University School in Victoria, British Columbia.

Sood began his career by appearing in the made-for-television film Survival On The Mountain, produced by Billy Crystal and Francis Ford Coppola. Since then, Sood has been a regular performer in television and feature film productions.

Most notably, he portrayed the leading role of, Baber Siddiqui in the popular CBC/Amazon Prime sitcom Little Mosque on the Prairie, which aired for six seasons. Other television appearances include Da Vinci's Inquest, The Dead Zone, Romeo! and Dead Like Me. Feature film appearances include Romeo Must Die, Rat Race, Meltdown, and Watchmen.

In the 2010s, his credits included the Brad Bird film Tomorrowland and roles in the television series Once Upon a Time in Wonderland, Continuum and Supernatural.

More recently he has appeared in the television series Snowpiercer, the Netflix hit, Wedding Season, and Bob Odenkirk's show Lucky Hank.

== Personal life ==
Sood is the brother of actress Veena Sood and the cousin of musician Ashwin Sood (who was previously married to popular singer Sarah McLachlan). He has a son, Kama L. Sood who is a filmmaker.

Sood is an avid fly fisherman. He is also a passionate amateur astronomer.

He has spoken out against the sexual exploitation of children at home and abroad for the advocacy group Beyond Borders.

== Filmography ==
Year	Title	Role	Notes
1997	Survival on the Mountain	Boutros	TV movie
1997	Doomsday Rock	Missile Commander	TV movie, uncredited
1997	Breaker High	Guru	Episode: "Don't Get Curried Away"
1997	Viper	P.M. Sintong Nameh	Episode: "Cat and Mouse"
2000	Romeo Must Die	Akbar	
2000	Da Vinci's Inquest	Man in Office Building	Episode: "That's the Way the Story Goes"
2001	Rat Race	High Roller	
2002	The Sausage Factory	Doctor	Episode: "Purity Test"
2002	Monk		Episode: "Mr. Monk and the Candidate: Part 1", uncredited
2002	The Dead Zone	Apu, Convenice Store Clerk	Episode: "Unreasonable Doubt"
2003	Firefight	Raja	
2003	Da Vinci's Inquest	Bernie	Episode: "Twenty Five Dollar Conversation"
2004	Jake 2.0	Dr. Vikram Taleek	Episode: "Dead Man Walking"
2004	Romeo!	Principal Gurjit Ramawad	Episode: "Loose Lips"
2004	Romeo!	Principal Gurjit Ramawad	Episode: "A Matter of Principal"
2004	Human Cargo	Mr. Sanjay Desai	TV mini-series
2004	Touching Evil	Mr. Patel	Episode: "Pilot"
2004	Snakehead Terror	Raj	
2004	Meltdown	Syed Kahn	TV movie
2004	Dead Like Me	Mr. Akhtar	Episode: "Send in the Clown"
2004	Dead Like Me	Mr. Akhtar	Episode: "Forget Me Not"
2005	The Dead Zone	Cabbie	Episode: "Double Vision"
2005	Robson Arms	Urologist	Episode: "A Certain Vintage"
2005	The 4400	Albert	Episode: "The Hidden"
2005	Fetching Cody	Security Guard	
2005	Da Vinci's City Hall	Santosh Kumar	Episode: "One Man, Two Jobs"
2005	Murder Unveiled	Lawyer	TV movie
2005	A Little Thing Called Murder	Syed Bial Ahmed	
2005	Godiva's	Mr. Hadieri	Episode: "Fast and Loose"
2006	Godiva's	Mr. Hadieri	Episode: "Floodgates"
2006	Godiva's	Mr. Hadieri	Episode: "Out the Door"
2006	The Evidence	Medical Examiner	Episode: "Borrowed Time"
2006	A Girl Like Me: The Gwen Araujo Story	Actor	TV movie
2007	White Noise: The Light	Male Nurse	
2007	Partition	The Wood Gatherer	
2007–2012	Little Mosque on the Prairie	Baber Siddiqui	Series Lead (91 episodes)
2008–2009	Winnipeg Comedy Festival	Baber Siddiqui	
2009	Watchmen	Karnak Scientist	
2010	Repeaters	Mr. Singh	
2011	R.L. Stine's The Haunting Hour	Mr. Sadigh	Episode: "The Dead Body"
2011	Fathers & Sons	Satish	
2011	Endgame	Dr. Abel Gray	Episode: "I Killed Her"
2011	Sisters & Brothers	Nata	
2011	The Debaters	Babar Siddiqui	Episode "Plastic Bags & Batman vs. Superman"
2011	Diary of a Wimpy Kid: Rodrick Rules	Convenience Store Customer #2	
2012	Profile For Murder	Dr. Sharma	
2013	Once Upon A Time In Wonderland	The Diplomat	Season 1 Episode 7 "Bad Blod"
2014	Continuum	Benedict	Season 3 Episode 5
2014	East Meets Ted	Executive producer, writer, Satish Scharma	In development
2014	Pants On Fire	Mr. Kar	
2015	Tomorrowland	Economics Teacher	
2015	Just In Time For Christmas	Richard	
2016	Grand Unified Field Theory	Dr. Al Razi	
2016	One Last Ride	Inderjeet	
2017	The Birthday Wish	Optometrist	
2017	Supernatural	Dr. Sharma	Season 12, Episode 16
2017	Violentia	Walter Mansingh	
2017	Darrow and Darrow	Justice Armendariz	
2017	Welcome To Surrey	Sunil	Series Lead
2017	Insomnia	Mukesh	Series Lead
2018	ICE	Justice Herman	Guest Star
2018	Salvation	Dr. Chandra	Recurring
2020–2022	Snowpiercer	Rajiv Sharma	Recurring
2020	Poisoned Love: The Stacey Castor Storey	Dr. Samra	
2021	Christmas in Crumbs	Avi Varma	
2021	Martha's Vineyard Mysteries	Marty Cline	Episode 4, Poisoned in Paradise
2022	Wedding Season	DInesh	
2022	Lucky Hank	Ali Mehaidle	
2023	Percy Jackson and the Olympians	The Principal	Episode: "I Accidentally Vaporize My Pre-Algebra Teacher"
