= Gabrielle Rose (actress) =

Canadian actress (born 1954)

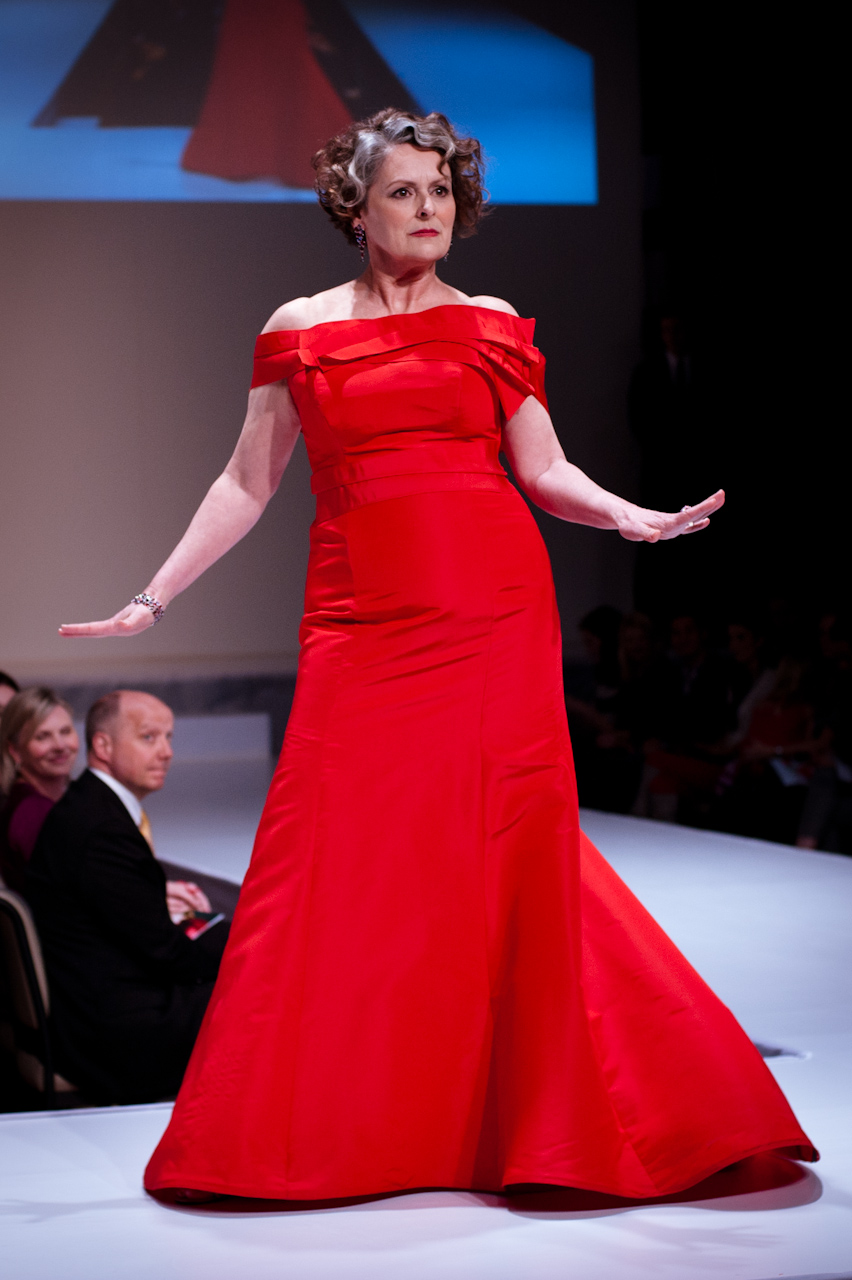
- Rose in 2012
- Born: September 7, 1954 (age 72); Kamloops, British Columbia, Canada
- Occupation: Actress
- Years active: 1975–present
- Spouse: Hrothgar Mathews
- Children: 2

Gabrielle Rose (born September 7, 1954) is a Canadian film, television and stage actress.

== Early life ==
Rose was born in Kamloops, British Columbia. Her grandfather L. Arthur Rose was a playwright, producer, and performer. Her father Ian Rose was a child actor before he became a doctor.

== Career ==
Rose started her career in Britain, where she trained at the Bristol Old Vic Theatre School and later joined the Bristol Old Vic. Afterwards she worked in theatres in the UK for a decade, before returning to Canada.

She has an extensive résumé that includes multiple nominations for Genie Awards and Gemini Awards. She has worked with director Atom Egoyan on many films including Where the Truth Lies, The Sweet Hereafter, Speaking Parts, Family Viewing and The Adjuster, and with director Bruce Sweeney on the film Excited, for which she won the Leo Award for Best Supporting Performance by a Female in a Feature Length Drama.

Other appearances include the films In the Name of the King: A Dungeon Siege Tale, The Five Senses, On the Other Hand, Death and Sisters & Brothers, and recurring roles in such TV shows as Rising Damp, Dark Angel, Robson Arms, Fringe and Once Upon a Time. Her most recent role was co-starring with Hilary Swank in the Netflix Series Away. She has also done voice work.

In 2016, Rose was awarded the Ian Caddell Vancouver Film Critics Circle Award for Achievement for her significant contributions to B.C.’s film industry.

== Personal life ==
She is married to actor Hrothgar Mathews and has two sons.

== Filmography ==
=== Film ===
Year	Title	Role	Notes
1985	The Journey of Natty Gann	Exercise Matron	
1987	The Stepfather	Dorothy Rinehard	
1988	Family Viewing	Sandra	
1989	Speaking Parts	Clara	
1991	Lighthouse	Connie	
1991	The Adjuster	Mimi	
1992	The Portrait	Lillian Severn	
1993	Kanada	Bobbie	
1993	Collateral Damage		
1994	Valentine's Day	Alex	
1994	Timecop	Judge Marshall	
1994	Sleeping with Strangers	Claire	
1995	Off Key	Agnes	Short film
1997	The Sweet Hereafter	Dolores Driscoll	
1998	The Sleep Room	Nurse Stephens	
1998	Altarpiece	Sister	Short film
1998	Shrink	Dr. D'Ambrosia	Short film
1999	The Five Senses	Ruth Seraph	
1999	Double Jeopardy	Georgia	
2000	A Feeling Called Glory	Joyce	Short film
2000	Lift	Covetousness	Short film
2000	Legs Apart	Nurse	Short film
2001	The Waiting Room	Nice Sister	Short film
2001	Speak	Mother	Short film
2002	The Rhino Brothers	Ellen Kanachowski	
2002	Go-Go Boy (Prelude)	Mrs. Fitz	Short film
2002	Beauty Shot	Beth Thompson	Short film
2003	Casanova at Fifty	Candace	Short film
2003	The Delicate Art of Parking	Ida Thomas	
2005	Where the Truth Lies	Publishing Executive	
2005	Missing in America	Cyd	
2005	Eighteen	Wendy	
2006	Sisters	Dr. Mercedes Kent	
2006	Catch and Release	Mrs. Wheeler	
2007	In the Name of the King: A Dungeon Siege Tale	Delinda	
2007	Joannie Learns to Cook	Helen	Short film
2007	Beneath	Mrs. Locke	
2007	Normal	Connie	
2008	On the Other Hand, Death	Edith	
2008	Lost Boys: The Tribe	Aunt Jillian	Video
2008	Mothers & Daughters	Brenda	
2008	Christmas Cottage	Evelyn	
2009	Courage	Hannah	
2009	Grace	Vivian Matheson	
2009	What Goes Up	Mrs. Bridigan	
2009	Jennifer's Body	Colin's Mom	
2009	Hungry Hills	Aunt Matilda	
2009	Excited	Claire	
2010	Alyssa	Mom	Short film
2010	Diary of a Wimpy Kid	Fregley's Mom	Deleted scene
2010	Amazon Falls	Margaret	
2010	Repeaters	Peg Halsted	
2010	Fathers & Sons	Mother	
2010	Exposed	Woman	Short film
2011	Everything and Everyone	Rose	
2011	The Provider	Mrs. Applebee	Short film
2011	Sisters & Brothers	Marion	
2011	The Big Year	Mary Swit	
2012	Crimes of Mike Recket	Leslie Klemper	
2012	Omg	Grandma	Short film
2013	The Ferret Squad	Olivia / Belva	
2013	Cinemanovels	Sophie	
2013	The Dick Knost Show	Kelly	
2014	Hector and the Search for Happiness	French Proprietress	
2014	Two 4 One	Franny	
2014	If I Stay	Gran	
2015	The Devout		
2015	The Birdwatcher	Birdy Eastman	
2017	A Dog's Purpose	Fran	
2018	Kingsway	Marion Horvat	
2023	She Talks to Strangers	Staci	
2025	Final Destination Bloodlines	Iris Campbell (old)	

=== Television ===
Year	Title	Role	Notes
1975	Rising Damp	Brenda	Recurring role (4 episodes) credited as Gay Rose
1976	Machinegunner	Jan	TV movie
1984	Secrets of a Married Man	Assistant	TV movie
1985	Blackout	Victim's Friend	TV movie
1985	Love, Mary	Julie Trenton	TV movie
1987	Street Legal	Jayne Reynolds	Episode: "Fever of the Blood"
1989	The Private Capital		TV movie
1989	Love and Hate: The Story of Colin and JoAnn Thatcher	June Graham	TV movie
1990	Neon Rider	Mrs. Carol Rudkin	Episode: "John Doe"
1991	Northwood	Jason's Mother	TV series
1992	Neon Rider	Jesse's Mother	Episode: "Straight Home"
1992	Street Justice	Mrs. Frank	Episode: "Catcher"
1992	Devlin	Sister Anne Elizabeth	TV movie
1992	The Commish	Dr. McNeeley	Episode: "The Puck Stops Here"
1993	The Commish	Linda Stone	Episode: "Hero"
1993	Dieppe	Anne	TV movie
1993	Other Women's Children	Dodie	TV movie
1993–94	The X-Files	Anita Budahas; Dr. Zenzola	2 episodes: "Deep Throat" (as Anita) "The Host" (as Dr. Zenzola)
1994	While Justice Sleeps	Sarah Berger	TV movie
1994–95	Madison	Mrs. Winslow	2 episodes
1995	Sliders	Christina Fox-Arturo	Episode: "Eggheads"
1995	Lonesome Dove: The Outlaw Years	Hester Tarbell	Episode: "Day of the Dead"
1996	My Mother's Ghost	Jeannie Locke	TV movie
1996	Home Song	Joan	TV movie
1996	Poltergeist: The Legacy	Esther	Episode: "Town Without Pity"
1997	The Sentinel	Emily Watson	Episode: "Breaking Ground"
1997	Jake and the Kid	Violet Bowdery	Recurring role (11 episodes)
1998	Cold Squad	Beverly Abbot	Episode: "Tess"
1998	Millennium	Sally	Episode: "Somehow, Satan Got Behind Me"
1999	Millennium	The Welcome Lady	Episode: "Saturn Dreaming of Mercury"
1999	Win, Again!	Lois Morrissey	TV movie
1999	Milgaard	Joyce Milgaard	TV movie
2000	Mysterious Ways	Mrs. Craven	Episode: "Intentions"
2001	Trapped	Mary Maculwain	TV movie
2001	Smallville	Mrs. Arkin	Episode: "Metamorphosis"
2002	Tom Stone	Lenore MacDonald	Episodes: "Dead Dog Rain: Parts 1 & 2"
2002	Dark Angel	Moorehead	Recurring role (5 episodes)
2002	Just Cause		Episode: "The Last to Know"
2002	Taken	Dr. Harriet Penzler	TV miniseries
2003	The Atwood Stories	Cappie	Episode: "Death by Landscape"
2003	Peacemakers	Kathryn Wentworth	Episode: "A Town Without Pity"
2003	Mob Princess	Barb	TV movie
2004	Cold Squad	Esther Stokes	Episode: "Cock of the Walk"
2005	Young Blades	Mother	Episode: "Rubadub Sub"
2005	Hush	Dell Carter	TV movie
2005	The Dead Zone	Mrs. Stampwell	Episode: "Coming Home"
2005–2008	Robson Arms	Toni Mastroianni-Tan	Recurring role (19 episodes)
2006	Augusta, Gone	Rose	TV movie
2006	Three Moons Over Milford	Colleen McIntyre	Episode: "Pilot"
2006	Alice, I Think	Gayle	Episode: "Wise Womyn"
2007	Battlestar Galactica	Mrs. King	Episode: "The Woman King"
2007	Cleaverville	Kay	TV movie
2007	Eureka	Carol Taylor	Episode: "E=MC...?"
2007–08	The L Word	Carol	2 episodes: "Lacy Lilting Lyrics" and "Least Likely"
2008	Stargate: The Ark of Truth	Alteran Woman 2	TV movie
2008	Eureka	Carol Taylor	Episode: "Best in Faux"
2008	Sanctuary	Ruth Meyers	Episode: "Edward"
2010	Lying to Be Perfect	Charlotte	TV movie
2010	Psych	Ruth Blake	Episode: "Feet Don't Kill Me Now"
2010	R.L. Stine's The Haunting Hour	Dollmaker	Episodes: "Really You: Parts 1 & 2"
2010	Shattered	Dr. Lynn Tanninger; Mrs. Bacic	Episodes: "Unaired Pilot", "Stairways to Perceptions"
2010, 2012	Fringe	Dr. Anderson	2 episodes: "Olivia" (alternate) & "Nothing As It Seems" (prime)
2011	Goodnight for Justice	Rebecca Shaw	TV movie
2011	He Loves Me	Dr. Browning	TV movie
2011	Best Player	Mrs. Johnson	TV movie
2011	Endgame	Linda	Episode: "Bless This Union"
2011–17	Once Upon a Time	Ruth	4 episodes: "The Shepherd" (2011) "Lady of the Lake" (2012) "White Out" (2014) "Heartless" (2016)
2012	R.L. Stine's The Haunting Hour	Dollmaker	Episode: "The Return of Lilly D"
2012	Anything But Christmas	Agnes Brooking	TV movie
2013	Fatal Performance	Mrs. Hatcher	TV movie
2013	Rogue	Sarah	Episode: "The Second Amendment"
2013	Let It Snow	Karla Lewis	TV movie
2014	Continuum	Samantha	Episode: "Minute Man"; Episode: "So Do Our Minutes Hasten"
2014	Wedding Planner Mystery	Clara Parry	TV movie
2016	The Man in the High Castle	Frau Silvia	4 episodes
2019	Unspeakable	Betsy	Recurring role (3 episodes)
2019	You Me Her	Mrs Trakarsky	Recurring role (3 episodes)
2019	The Christmas Club	Gertrude	Hallmark Movie
2019	See	Lady An	Episode: "The River"
2020	Away	Darlene Cole	Recurring role (7 episodes)
2020	The Stand	Judge Farris	Recurring role (3 episodes)
2021	Heartland	Gladys Adderly	Episode: "Blue Bird"
2022	The Holiday Sitter	Marilyn DiVito	Hallmark Movie
2023	Firefly Lane	End of life Therapist	Episode: "Moondance"
2023	The Night Agent	Lorna	Episode: "Eyes only"
2023–present	Virgin River	Amelia Sheridan	Recurring role

== Awards/Nominations ==
Awards
Year	Award	Category	Production	Result
1988	Genie	Best Performance by an Actress in a Leading Role	Family Viewing	Nominated
1990	Genie	Best Performance by an Actress in a Leading Role	Speaking Parts	Nominated
1997	Genie	Best Performance by an Actress in a Leading Role	The Sweet Hereafter	Nominated
1997	National Board of Review	Best Acting by an Ensemble	The Sweet Hereafter	Won
1998	Gemini	Bset Performance by an Actress in a Featured Supporting Role in a Dramatic Program or Miniseries	The Sleep Room	Nominated
1998	Gemini	Best Performance by an Actress in a Guest Role in a Dramatic Series	Cold Squad ("Rita Brice")	Nominated
1999	Gemini	Best Performance by an Actress in a Leading Role in a Dramatic Program or Miniseries	Hard Time: The David Milgaard Story	Nominated
1999	Gemini	Best Performance by an Actress in a Leading Role in a Dramatic Program or Miniseries	Win, Again!	Nominated
2002	Gemini	Best Performance by an Actress in a Guest Role in a Dramatic Series	Tom Stone ("Dead Dog Rain: Part I)	Nominated
2007	Leo	Best Supporting Performance by a Female in a Dramatic Series	Robson Arms ("All About Kitty")	Nominated
2009	Leo	Best Guest Performance by a Female in a Dramatic Series	Sanctuary ("Edward")	Won
2010	Leo	Best Supporting Performance by a Female in a Feature Length Drama	Excited	Won
2010	Vancouver Film Critics Circle	Best Supporting Actress in a Canadian Film	Excited	Won
2010	Genie	Best Performance by an Actress in a Leading Role	Mothers&Daughters	Nominated
2016	Vancouver Film Critics Circle	Ian Caddell Vancouver Film Critics Circle Award for Achievement	British Columbian actor who has made a significant contribution to the BC film industry	Won
