= The Date =

The Date may refer to:

- The Date (1977), a 16mm short film directed by Donald MacDonald
- The Date (1992 film), a Canadian short film directed by Nikos Theodosakis,
- The Date (1999 film), an Australian short film directed by Damon Herriman and William Usic which won an award at Tropfest in 1999,
- The Date (2012 film), a Finnish short film directed by Jenni Toivoniemi which won an award at the 2013 Sundance Film Festival.
