= Down River (2013 film) =

- Film poster
- Directed by: Benjamin Ratner
- Written by: Benjamin Ratner
- Produced by: James Brown; Andrew Halliwell; Benjamin Ratner
- Starring: Helen Shaver; Gabrielle Miller; Jennifer Spence; Colleen Rennison
- Cinematography: Larry Lynn
- Edited by: Robert Wenzek
- Music by: Chris Ainscough
- Production companies: Gossamer Creative; Haven Films
- Distributed by: Indiecan Entertainment
- Release date: September 22, 2013 (Cinéfest)
- Running time: 93 minutes
- Country: Canada
- Language: English

Down River is a Canadian drama film, directed by Benjamin Ratner and released in 2013.

Created as a tribute to actress Babz Chula following her death in 2010, the film stars Helen Shaver as Pearl, an older woman who is a friend and mentor to actress Fawn (Gabrielle Miller), visual artist Aki (Jennifer Spence) and bisexual musician Harper (Colleen Rennison). The cast also includes Jay Brazeau, Tahmoh Penikett, Ali Liebert, Brian Markinson, Tom McBeath, Nancy Sivak and Hiro Kanagawa.

The film premiered at the 2013 Cinéfest Sudbury International Film Festival. It was subsequently screened at the Vancouver International Film Festival, where it won the Audience Award for Most Popular Canadian Film and received an honorable mention from the jury for the Best British Columbia Film award.

== Cast ==
- Helen Shaver as Pearl
- Gabrielle Miller as Fawn
- Jennifer Spence as Aki
- Colleen Rennison as Harper
- Jay Brazeau as Larry
- Teach Grant as Todd
- Ali Liebert as Molly
- Peter Flemming as Peter
- Brian Markinson as Otto
- Tahmoh Penikett as Chris
- Daevyd Avalon as Murray (credited as David-Paul Grove)
- Kevin House as Dooley
- Nancy Sivak as Lili
- Hiro Kanagawa as Aki's Father
- Jerry Wasserman as Dr. Leonard
- Tom McBeath as Bob
- Loretta Walsh as Victoria
- Kimberley Sustad as Christie (credited as Kimberly Sustad)
- Nadia Vanessa Rose as Molly's New Girlfriend (credited as Nadia Blanchfield)
- Mike Branham as Harper's Dealer

== Awards ==
The film won the Vancouver Film Critics Circle's award for Best British Columbia Film, and Rennison received a Canadian Screen Award nomination for Best Original Song at the 2nd Canadian Screen Awards, for the song "Molly".

The film led the nominations at the 2014 Leo Awards with 13 nods, including Best Motion Picture, Best Actress (Shaver), Best Supporting Actress (2: Rennison, Spence), Best Director (Ratner), Best Screenplay (Ratner), Best Musical Score (Chris Ainscough, Kevin House), Best Editing (Robert Wenzek), Best Cinematography (Larry Lynn), Best Production Design (Josh Plaw), Best Costume Design (Gloria Tsui) and Best Overall Sound (Brian Lyster, Randy Kiss and Michael Macdonald). It won the awards for Best Picture, Supporting Actress (Spence), Screenplay, Costume Design and Overall Sound.
