= Vincent Gale =

Scottish-Canadian actor (born 1968)

- Born: 6 March 1968 (age 58); Glasgow, Scotland
- Education: Royal Conservatoire of Scotland
- Occupation: Actor

Vincent Gale (born 6 March 1968) is a Scottish-born Canadian film and television actor, who won the Genie Award for Best Supporting Actor at the 2002 Genie Awards for his performance in the film Last Wedding. He is perhaps best known for playing Phil "Flesh" Fleischman in the Syfy series Van Helsing.

== Career ==
Gale's other acting credits include the films Firewall, Bye Bye Blues, Fathers & Sons, Inuyasha: Affections Touching Across Time and Hello Mary Lou: Prom Night II, and the television series Snowpiercer, The Dragon Prince, Neon Rider, Queer as Folk, Da Vinci's Inquest, X-Men: Evolution, Dragon Boys, Eureka, Blackstone, Stargate SG-1, Stargate Universe, Battlestar Galactica, Bates Motel, Supernatural, Arrow, and Supergirl. He played "Flesh" on the Syfy network series Van Helsing.

== Filmography ==
=== Film ===
Year	Title	Role	Notes
1984	Isaac Littlefeathers	Zennon Varco	
1987	Hello Mary Lou: Prom Night II	Rejected Boy	
1989	Bye Bye Blues	Will Wright	
1991	Run	Bowler	
1991	Crooked Hearts	Charley's Friend	
1998	Dirty	Ethan	
1999	True Heart	George	
2000	Trixie	Sid Deflore	
2001	Last Wedding	Shane	
2001	Inuyasha the Movie: Affections Touching Across Time	Menomaru	
2002	Punch	Irwin	
2004	The Final Cut	Simon	
2005	Fugitives Run	Bernie	
2006	Firewall	Willy	
2007	American Venus	Crack Dealer	
2007	BloodRayne 2: Deliverance	Mick	
2008	Mothers & Daughters	Vincent	
2009	Alien Trespass	Stiles	
2009	Excited	Jeff	
2010	Fathers & Sons	Vince	
2014	Hector and the Search for Happiness	Clara's Boss	
2014	Big Eyes	Tipsy Man	
2016	Brain on Fire	Dr. Samson	
2016	L.O.R.D: Legend of Ravaging Dynasties	You Ming (Dark)	
2017	The Mountain Between Us	Airline Customer Service	
2020	Sniper: Assassin's End	Donald South	
2021	Every Breath You Take	Stuart Fanning	2022 A Royal Runaway Romance Hallmark movie
2023	Double Life	Larry	

=== Television ===
Year	Title	Role	Notes
1980	The Lost Tribe	James	Miniseries
1984	Draw!	Acting Troupe	Television film
1989	Magic Hour: Tom Alone	Edward Mallandaine	Television film
1990	MacGyver	Duke Lyman	Episode: "The Gun"
1991	21 Jump Street	Fingers	Episode: "Crossfire"
1994	Highlander: The Series	Lattimore	Episode: "Blackmail"
1996	Two	Kevin	Episode: "Armies of the Night"
1997	Major Crime	Dean Hedican	Television film
1997, 1999	Dead Man's Gun	Cullen / Tyree	2 episodes
1998	Baby Monitor: Sound of Fear	Jimmy	Television film
1998	F/X: The Series	Gary	Episode: "Standoff"
1998	The Escape	Newby	Television film
1998	Every Mother's Worst Fear	Drew Pederson	Television film
1998	Killers in the House	Louis Sykes	Television film
1998–2000	The Outer Limits	Various roles	3 episodes
1999	A Murder on Shadow Mountain	Def. Atty. Travis Wysocki	Television film
1999	Brotherhood of Murder	Richard Parker	Television film
1999	Sherlock Holmes in the 22nd Century	Guest voice	26 episodes
1999–2002	Da Vinci's Inquest	Alfie / Pete Kowalski	5 episodes
2000	Seven Days	Lt. Col. Sergei Potenkin	Episode: "Space Station Down"
2000	First Wave	Peter Mince	Episode: "Mabus"
2000–2003	X-Men: Evolution	Duncan Matthews	9 episodes
2000, 2004	Cold Squad	Grant Chilton	2 episodes
2001	Big Sound	Peter Osgood	Episode: "The Day the Music Croaked"
2001	Strange Frequency	Chris	Episode: "Cold Turkey"
2002	Special Unit 2	Martinez	Episode: "The Straw"
2002	Jeremiah	Cord Geary	Episode: "Red Kiss"
2002	Strange Frequency 2	Chris	Television film
2002	Stargate SG-1	Deputy / Agent Cross	Episode: "Nightwalkers"
2002	Monk	Jesse Goodman	2 episodes
2002	Breaking News	Quentin Druzinski	13 episodes
2003	A Wrinkle in Time	Ellwood	Television film
2003	Queer as Folk	Mark	4 episodes
2003	The Dead Zone	Joe Foster	Episode: "Visions"
2004	12 Days of Christmas Eve	Drew Quinn	Television film
2005	14 Hours	Finnegan	Television film
2005	Murder at the Presidio	Private Brooks	Television film
2005–2009	Battlestar Galactica	Chief Peter Laird	5 episodes
2006	Meltdown: Days of Destruction	Nathan	Television film
2006	Murder on Pleasant Drive	Detective Mike Dansbury	Television film
2006	Intelligence	Randall	Episode: "Don't Break Your Brother's Heart"
2006	Rapid Fire	Manny	Television film
2006–2017	Supernatural	Various roles	3 episodes
2007	Painkiller Jane	Painkiller Jane	Episode: "Trial by Fire"
2007	The 4400	Jack Delphy	Episode: "Fear Itself"
2007	Eureka	Dr. Todd	Episode: "Try, Try Again"
2007	Battlestar Galactica: Razor	Peter Laird	Television film
2007	Second Sight	Mr. Raskind	Television film
2007	Masters of Science Fiction	Jack Valentine	Episode: "Watchbird"
2007	Everest '82	John Amatt	4 episodes
2007	Dragon Boys	Cpl. Dan 'Crow' Cromartie	2 episodes
2008	Mail Order Bride	Ghost	Television film
2009	Web of Desire	Dr. Brian Doyle	Television film
2009	Fringe	Dobbins	Episode: "Of Human Action"
2010	Human Target	Detective Simms	Episode: "Tanarak"
2010	On Strike for Christmas	Keith	Television film
2010	The Cult	Dr. Frank Hollingshurst	Television film
2010–2011	Stargate Universe	Morrison	6 episodes
2010, 2011	Sanctuary	Nigel Griffin	2 episodes
2011	SGU Stargate Universe Kino	Morrison	Episode: "Painful Moments"
2011	CHAOS	Schmidt	Episode: "Deep Cover Band"
2011	True Justice	Mike	2 episodes
2011	The Haunting Hour: The Series	Mr. Dunwood	Episode: "Swarmin' Norman"
2012	Blackstone	Detective Deacon	5 episodes
2013	Motive	Randy Sprague	Episode: "Pushover"
2013	She Made Them Do It	Detective Murphy	Television film
2013	Romeo Killer: The Chris Porco Story	Mike McDermott	Television film
2013–2014	Bates Motel	Gil Turner	5 episodes
2014	Sole Custody	Hodge	Television film
2014	My Gal Sunday	Wexler Klint	Television film
2014	Psych	Mr. Grouse	Episode: "Cog Blocked"
2015	Surprised by Love	Surprised by Love	Television film
2015	Reign	Lord Akers	2 episodes
2015	Ungodly Acts	Gary	Television film
2015	Love on the Air	Brad	Television film
2015	Ties That Bind	Terrence	Episode: "Legacy"
2015	A Mother's Instinct	Chris Betnner	Television film
2016	Get Out Alive	Alex Kozlov	Television film
2016	Unclaimed	Sargent Zimmer	Television film
2016	Arrow	Pyotr Friedkin	Episode: "Penance"
2016	Who Killed JonBenét?	ADA Hofstrom	Television film
2016	A Heavenly Christmas	Patrick	Television film
2016–2019	Van Helsing	Flesh	28 episodes
2017	All of My Heart: Inn Love	Roger Bailey	Television film
2017	Travelers	Traveler 0029	Episode: "Traveler 0027"
2017, 2018	Past Malice	Prof. Thomas Webster	2 episodes
2018	Supergirl	Dr. Vose	Episode: "American Alien"
2019	Morning Show Mysteries	Edmund Stokes	Episode: "Countdown to Murder"
2019; 2024	The Dragon Prince	Ethari	5 episodes
2020	Martha's Vineyard Mysteries	Victor Gaines	Episode: "Riddled with Deceit"
2020	Snowpiercer	Robert Folger	8 episodes
2021	The Long Island Serial Killer: A Mother's Hunt for Justice	Desk Sergeant	Television film
2021	Midnight Mass	Howie Hobbs	3 episodes
2024–present	Allegiance	Oliver Campbell	Supporting
2025	Watson	Mycroft Holmes	Recurring
