= Fathers & Sons (2010 film) =

Fathers and Sons
- Film poster
- Directed by: Carl Bessai
- Written by: Carl Bessai
- Produced by: Carl Bessai; Jason James
- Starring: Benjamin Ratner; Jay Brazeau; Stephen Lobo; Manoj Sood; Tyler Labine; Vincent Gale
- Cinematography: Carl Bessai
- Edited by: Mark Shearer
- Music by: Schaun Tozer
- Production company: Ravenwest Films
- Distributed by: Kinosmith
- Release date: September 25, 2010 (EIFF)
- Running time: 87 minutes
- Country: Canada
- Language: English

Fathers & Sons is a 2010 Canadian comedy-drama film, directed by Carl Bessai. An unofficial sequel to his 2008 film Mothers & Daughters, it used a similar process of improvisational character development to dramatize several stories of relationships between fathers and sons.

Bernie (Benjamin Ratner) meets his estranged father Anton (Jay Brazeau) for the first time at his mother's funeral; Kama (Stephen Lobo) is an accountant who is embarrassed to introduce his fiancée (Sonja Bennett) to his flamboyant gay Bollywood choreographer father Satish (Manoj Sood); Viv (Viv Leacock) and his father Blu (Blu Mankuma) don't see eye to eye about money; Vince (Vincent Gale), Sean (Tyler Labine), Hrothgar (Hrothgar Mathews), and Tom (Tom Scholte) are four brothers, not especially close, who are in for a surprise at the reading of their late father's will.

The film won the Vancouver Film Critics Circle Award for Best British Columbia Film in 2010.

Bessai followed up with a third film in his "Family Trilogy", Sisters & Brothers, in 2011.

== Cast ==
- Stephen Lobo as Kama / Cameron
- Manoj Sood as Satish
- Tyler Labine as Sean
- Vincent Gale as Vince
- Hrothgar Mathews as Hrothgar
- Tom Scholte as Tom
- Blu Mankuma as Blu
- Viv Leacock as Viv
- Jay Brazeau as Anton
- Benjamin Ratner as Bernie
- Sonja Bennett as Sonja

Other cast members;

- Jennifer-Juniper Angeli as Concerned Mother
- Tantoo Cardinal as Gordon's Sister
- Babz Chula as Aunt Barbara
- Agam Darshi as Agam
- Richard de Klerk as Leonard
- Alisen Down as Waitress
- Rebecca Jenkins as Rebecca
- Leena Manro as Leena
- Gabrielle Rose as Mother
