= Vancouver Film Critics Circle Award for Best Actor in a Canadian Film =

Canadian film award

The Vancouver Film Critics Circle Award for Best Actor in Canadian Film is an annual award given by the Vancouver Film Critics Circle. In 2000 and 2001 the award was only given to Canadian actors, the last few years every actor who plays in a Canadian production can win the award.

== Winners ==
=== 2000s ===
Year	Actor	Film	Role	Ref.
2000	Brendan Fletcher	Rollercoaster	Stick	
2000	Nicholas Campbell	New Waterford Girl	Francis Pottie	
2000	Fabrizio Filippo	waydowntown	Tom Bennett	
2001	Benjamin Ratner	Last Wedding	Noah	
2001	Peter Outerbridge	Marine Life	Robert Kiley	
2001	Michael Riley	Mile Zero	Derek	
2001	Tom Scholte	Last Wedding	Peter	
2002	Callum Keith Rennie	Flower & Garnet	Ed	
2002	Michael Riley	Punch	Sam Frizzell	
2002	Tygh Runyan	Various Positions	Josh	
2003	Philip Seymour Hoffman	Owning Mahowny	Dan Mahowny	
2003	Rémy Girard	The Barbarian Invasions (Les Invasions barbares)	Rémy	
2003	Callum Keith Rennie	Falling Angels	Jim Field	
2004	Don McKellar	Childstar	Rick Schiller	
2004	Noel Burton	A Silent Love	Norman	
2004	Jacob Tierney	Blood	Chris Terry	
2005	Marc-André Grondin	C.R.A.Z.Y.	Zachary Beaulieu	
2005	Paul Kaye	It's All Gone Pete Tong	Frankie Wilde	
2005	Kris Lemche	A Simple Curve	Caleb	
2006	Don McKellar	Monkey Warfare	Dan	
2006	Paulo Costanzo	Everything's Gone Green	Ryan	
2006	Roy Dupuis	The Rocket	Maurice Richard	
2007	Viggo Mortensen	Eastern Promises	Nicolai	
2007	Roy Dupuis	Shake Hands with the Devil	Roméo Dallaire	
2007	Rossif Sutherland	Poor Boy's Game	Donnie Rose	
2008	Natar Ungalaaq	The Necessities of Life (Ce qu'il faut pour vivre)	Tiivii	
2008	Antoine L'Écuyer	It's Not Me, I Swear! (C'est pas moi, je le jure!)	Léon Doré	
2008	Jim Sturgess	Fifty Dead Men Walking	Martin McGartland	
2009	Xavier Dolan	I Killed My Mother (J'ai tué ma mère)	Hubert Minel	
2009	Sébastien Huberdeau	Polytechnique	Jean-François	
2009	Stephen McHattie	Pontypool	Grant Mazzy	

=== 2010s ===
Year	Actor	Film	Role	Ref.
2010	Paul Giamatti	Barney's Version	Barney Panofsky	
2010	Jay Baruchel	The Trotsky	Leon Bronstein	
2010	Paul Spence	FUBAR 2	Dean	
2011	Peter Stormare	Small Town Murder Songs	Walter	
2011	Mohamed Fellag	Monsieur Lazhar	Bashir Lazhar	
2011	Patrick Huard	Starbuck	David Wozniak	
2012	Michael Rogers	Beyond the Black Rainbow	Dr Barry Nyle	
2012	Robert Pattinson	Cosmopolis	Eric Packer	
2012	Melvil Poupaud	Laurence Anyways	Laurence	
2013	Matt Johnson	The Dirties	Matt	
2013	Thomas Haden Church	Whitewash	Bruce	
2013	Tom Scholte	The Dick Knost Show	Dick Knost	
2014	Antoine Olivier Pilon	Mommy	Steve Desprès	
2014	Jake Gyllenhaal	Enemy	Adam Bell / Anthony Claire	
2014	Maxwell McCabe-Lokos	The Husband	Henry Andreas	
2015	Jacob Tremblay	Room	Jack Newsome	
2015	Michael Eklund	Eadweard	Eadweard Muybridge	
2015	Christopher Plummer	Remember	Zev Guttman/Otto Wallisch	
2016	Jared Abrahamson	Hello Destroyer	Tyson Burr	
2016	Chen Gang	Old Stone	Lao Shi	
2016	Andrew Gillis	Werewolf	Blaise	
2017	Ronnie Rowe	Black Cop	Black Cop	
2017	Jared Abrahamson	Gregoire	Felix	
2017	Anthony Therrien	Fake Tattoos (Les faux tatouages)	Theo	
2018	Tyler York	Edge of the Knife (SG̲aawaay Ḵʹuuna)	Adiitsʹii / Gaagiixid	
2018	Théodore Pellerin	Genesis (Genèse)	Guillaume	
2018	Josh Wiggins	Giant Little Ones	Franky Winter	
2019	Dan Beirne	The Twentieth Century	Mackenzie King	
2019	Tim Guinee	Ash	Stan	
2019	David Thewlis	Guest of Honour	Jim	

=== 2020s ===
Year	Actor	Film	Role	Ref.
2020	Justin Rain	Brother, I Cry	Jon	
2020	Adam Brody	The Kid Detective	Abraham "Abe" Applebaum	
2020	Alex Crowther	Flowers of the Field	Aaron Warner	
2020	Marlon Kazadi	Chained	Taylor	
2021	Daniel Doheny	Drinkwater	Mike Drinkwater	
2021	Pavle Čemerikić	The White Fortress (Tabija)	Faruk	
2021	Jorge Antonio Guerrero	Drunken Birds (Les Oiseaux ivres)	Willy	
2022	Isaiah Lehtinen	I Like Movies	Lawrence	
2022	Adam Beach	Exile	Ted Evans	
2022	Lamar Johnson	Brother	Michael	
2023	Jay Baruchel	BlackBerry	Mike Lazaridis	
2023	Cody Lightning	Hey, Viktor!	Cody	
2023	Théodore Pellerin	Solo	Simon	
2024	Matt Johnson	Matt and Mara	Matt	
2024	Roy Dupuis	Rumours	Maxime Laplace	
2024	Jae-Hyun Kim	Mongrels	Sonny	
2025	Matt Johnson	Nirvanna the Band the Show the Movie	Matt	
2025	Michael Greyeyes	Meadowlarks	Anthony	
2025	Leo Woodall	Tuner	Niki White	
