= Mount Pleasant (film) =

- Directed by: Ross Weber
- Written by: Ross Weber
- Produced by: Kimberley Wakefield
- Starring: Benjamin Ratner; Camille Sullivan; Shawn Doyle; Kelly Rowan; Katie Boland; Tygh Runyan
- Cinematography: Asaf Benny
- Edited by: Karen Porter
- Music by: Marc Bjorknas
- Production company: L'Étranger Film Productions
- Distributed by: Odeon Films
- Release date: October 7, 2006 (VIFF)
- Running time: 87 minutes
- Country: Canada
- Language: English

Mount Pleasant is a 2006 Canadian drama film, directed by Ross Weber.

Set in the Vancouver, British Columbia, neighbourhood of Mount Pleasant, the film centres on three families brought together by fate: Doug (Benjamin Ratner) and Sarah (Camille Sullivan), a young couple who have just moved into the neighbourhood but face a crisis when their young daughter Courtney (Haley Guiel) has to undergo HIV testing after accidentally pricking herself on a used needle discarded in their yard; Stephen (Shawn Doyle) and Anne (Kelly Rowan) Burrows, a wealthy couple challenged by the rebelliousness of their teenage daughter Megan (Genevieve Buechner); and Nadia (Katie Boland) and Nick (Tygh Runyan), an underage prostitute whom Stephen is hiring for sex and her drug addict boyfriend.

The cast also includes Jillian Fargey, Nancy Sivak, Jennifer Clement, Nicole LaPlaca, William MacDonald, Mylène Dinh-Robic, Sophie Yendole, Cam Cronin, Megan Leitch and Peter LaCroix.

The film premiered at the 2006 Vancouver International Film Festival, before going into commercial release in early 2007.

== Critical response ==
Jay Stone of the Vancouver Sun wrote that "Writer-director Ross Weber (Moving Malcolm) evokes solid performances and keeps the plot plunging forward with a street- savvy earnestness: Mount Pleasant, it is apparent, was made by someone who knows the neighbourhood. Unfortunately, it takes all the issues of the inner city (prostitutes and their clients, drug addiction, homelessness) and cloaks them in the sort of melodrama that would feel gritty on prime-time television but not so much so in the movies. The movie is also a victim of a modest budget that results in a stark and underpopulated look, and its idea of teen rebellion -- young kids smashing nice dishes! -- doesn't have the sense of danger it needs. Nothing approaching the idea of the affordable $1.5-million house."

Susan Walker of the Toronto Star wrote that "Most of the experienced talent here - Benjamin Ratner as Doug Cameron, The O.C.'s Kelly Rowan as Anne Burrows, Camille Sullivan as Sarah Cameron and Shawn Doyle as Stephen Burrows - perform what is expected of them well but are badly misdirected. Only the children - Nadia, Courtney and Megan - offer us much reason to care. The overwrought adults are barely credible, let alone worthy of our concern. But maybe that's the point. A few pieces of the jigsaw puzzle are still lying on the table after Mount Pleasant wraps up in relief for some and humiliation or certain despair for others. It's a plausible set of scenarios that only needs a couple more turns of the screw to make it a more engaging narrative."

== Awards ==
The film received three Vancouver Film Critics Circle award nominations at the Vancouver Film Critics Circle Awards 2006, for Best British Columbia Film, Best Supporting Actor in a Canadian Film (Ratner) and Best Supporting Actress in a Canadian Film (Rowan).

Weber won the Leo Award for Best Direction in a Feature Length Drama, and Ratner won the Leo for Best Supporting Actor in a Feature Length Drama, at the 2007 Leo Awards.
