= Tom Scholte =

Canadian actor

Tom Scholte is a Canadian actor and academic. He is most noted for his performances in the film Last Wedding, for which he was a Genie Award nominee for Best Supporting Actor at the 22nd Genie Awards in 2002 and a Vancouver Film Critics Circle nominee for Best Actor in a Canadian Film at the Vancouver Film Critics Circle Awards 2001, and The Dick Knost Show, for which he received a Vancouver Film Critics Circle nomination for Best Actor in a Canadian Film at the Vancouver Film Critics Circle Awards 2013.

He has also appeared in the films Live Bait, Goldrush: A Real Life Alaskan Adventure, No More Monkeys Jumpin' on the Bed, Lunch with Charles, Moving Malcolm, See Grace Fly, Fathers & Sons, Sisters & Brothers and Kingsway, and the television series The X-Files, Da Vinci's Inquest, and Cold Squad.

He was a cofounder of the Neworld Theatre Company in Vancouver, British Columbia, is a two-time Jessie Richardson Award nominee for his stage performances, and is a professor in the department of theatre and film at the University of British Columbia.

Scholte's academic work is in the intersection of theatre studies and cybernetics. In 2021, Scholte became Vice-President of the American Society for Cybernetics (ASC) Scholte is a presenter on the 'Systems and Cybernetics' podcast of the New Books Network.

== Contributions to cybernetics ==
Scholte's contributions to cybernetics have focused on the role of the creative arts with cybernetics and developing cybernetics' critical possibilities.

Scholte co-hosted the 2019 ASC conference 'Acting Cybernetically'.

== Personal life ==
He married actress Frida Betrani in 2004.

== Filmography ==
=== Film ===
Year	Title	Role	Notes
1996	Live Bait	Trevor MacIntosh	
1997	Drive, She Said	Arnold The Gas Guy	
1998	Dirty	David	
1999	Snow Falling on Cedars	Reporter	
2000	No More Monkeys Jumpin' on the Bed	Peter	
2001	Lunch with Charles	Tom	
2001	Last Wedding	Peter	
2003	The Core	Acker	
2003	Moving Malcolm	Mover	
2003	See Grace Fly	James	
2004	The Thing Below	Edward Lynch	
2004	Walking Tall	Merle Crowe	
2004	Lies Like Truth	Danny Fitterson	
2004	Everyone	Roger	
2005	The Hamster Cage	Paul	Also producer
2008	Crime	Brent	
2008	Mothers & Daughters	Dinner Party Guest Thomas	
2010	Repeaters	Sgt. Gerald Tibbs	
2010	Fathers & Sons	Tom	
2011	Exley	Poker Player #1	
2011	Sisters & Brothers	Henry Adams	Also co-creator
2012	Crimes of Mike Recket	Peter	
2013	The Dick Knost Show	Dick Knost	Also producer
2014	Bad City	The Chief	
2018	Kingsway	Bar Buddy	

=== Television ===
Year	Title	Role	Notes
1996	Dead Ahead	Deputy Hutchins	Television film
1996	Psi Factor	Howie Samek	Episode: "The Infestation/Human Apportation"
1996, 1997	The X-Files	Michael Sloan / Young Johansen	Episodes: "Detour"; "Piper Maru"
1997	Dead Man's Gun	Deputy Harold Cooper	Episode: "Fortune Teller"
1998	The Wonderful World of Disney	Monte Marks	Episode: "Goldrush: A Real Life Alaskan Adventure"
2001	Da Vinci's Inquest	David	Episode: "Oppenheimer Park"
2002	The Dead Zone	Sports Nut	Episode: "Unreasonable Doubt"
2002	The Twilight Zone	Writer #1	Episode: "Gabe's Story"
2003	Stargate SG-1	Chazen	Episode: "Prophecy"
2003	Jinnah: On Crime - White Knight, Black Widow	Len Birmbaum	Television film
2005	Cold Squad	Lee Styles	Episode: "C'mon I Tip Waitresses"
2021	Trigger Me	Phillip	2 episodes

== Awards and nominations ==
Year	Award	Category	Work	Result	Refs
1999	Leo Awards	Best Performance by a Male in a Feature Length Drama	Dirty	Nominated	
2000	Leo Awards	Best Performance by a Male in a Short Drama	Babette's Feet	Nominated	
2001	Leo Awards	Best Performance by a Male in a Short Drama	What Else Have You Got?	Nominated	
2002	17th Gemini Awards	Best Performance by an Actor in a Guest Role Dramatic Series	Da Vinci's Inquest; Episode: "Oppenheimer Park"	Won	
2002	22nd Genie Awards	Best Performance by an Actor in a Supporting Role	Last Wedding	Nominated	
2002	Leo Awards	Best Supporting Performance by a Male in a Dramatic Series	Da Vinci's Inquest; Episode: "Oppenheimer Park"	Nominated	
2002	Leo Awards	Best Supporting Performance by a Male in a Feature Length Drama	Last Wedding	Won	
2002	Vancouver Film Critics Circle Awards 2001	Best Actor in Canadian Film	Last Wedding	Nominated	
2004	Leo Awards	Best Supporting Performance by a Male in a Feature Length Drama	See Grace Fly	Nominated	
2004	Leo Awards	Best Performance by a Male in a Short Drama	Exposures	Won	
2011	Leo Awards	Best Lead Performance by a Male in a Feature Length Drama	Fathers & Sons	Nominated	
2012	Leo Awards	Best Supporting Performance by a Male in a Feature Length Drama	Sisters & Brothers	Won	
2014	Vancouver Film Critics Circle Awards 2013	Best Actor in a Canadian Film	The Dick Knost Show	Nominated	
