= Repeaters =

- Directed by: Carl Bessai
- Written by: Arne Olsen
- Produced by: Jason James; Carl Bessai; Richard de Klerk; Irene Nelson
- Starring: Dustin Milligan; Amanda Crew; Richard de Klerk
- Cinematography: Carl Bessai
- Edited by: Mark Shearer
- Music by: Jeff Danna
- Production companies: Rampart Films; Raven West Films; Resonance Films
- Distributed by: Alliance Films
- Release date: September 13, 2010 (TIFF)
- Running time: 86 minutes
- Country: Canada
- Language: English

Repeaters is a 2010 Canadian thriller film directed by Carl Bessai, written by Arne Olsen, and starring Dustin Milligan, Amanda Crew, and Richard de Klerk as young drug addicts who find themselves stuck in a time loop.

== Plot ==
Kyle, Sonia, and Michael are inmates at a rehabilitation facility. Bob, the administrator, tasks them with apologizing to those they have hurt with their addiction. When Kyle attempts to apologize to his teenage sister Charlotte, she angrily blows him off, and the principal kicks him off school grounds. Sonia goes to the hospital where her dying father is a patient, but she is unable to bring herself to face him. Michael visits his father in jail, but the conversation is cut short by his father's abusive threats. When Bob asks them to discuss their day in group therapy, they refuse, and Michael storms off. While discussing the pointlessness of Bob's therapy, Sonia learns that her father has died. As the trio tries to deal with their emotional pain, a storm rolls in, and each of them is shocked and knocked unconscious.

When they wake up in the morning, they find that it is the same day, and all the same events repeat. Kyle, Sonia, and Michael stumble through the day and repeat their actions in a daze. When they discuss the situation, Michael is intrigued by the consequence-free possibilities open to them, but Kyle convinces them to act on a news report that he recalls. They go to a dam but are too late to stop a jumper. Michael suggests that they take advantage of the situation, and they commit petty crimes that result in a stay in jail. Eventually, as the day repeats endlessly, they embark on a drug bender and crime spree, robbing a store and culminating in the violent kidnapping of Tiko, a drug dealer who has been selling to Charlotte and her friend Michelle. On another loop, Michael forces Kyle to slice Tiko’s throat. At the dam, Michael carelessly risks his life walking on top of the railing and dares Sonia to do the same. When she slips, Michael merely laughs and refuses to try to help Kyle save her. Sonia falls to her death, then wakes up with a gasp on the next repeat. Sonia claims to remember nothing of her death, and the trio become emboldened by their apparent immortality.

On one repeat, Kyle and Sonia save the jumper at the dam, then discover that Michael has raped Michelle. When Kyle and Sonia confront Michael, Michael accuses them of hypocrisy and says that all their bad actions are excusable because everything gets reset. Michael's behavior becomes more violent and antisocial as the days repeat. Shaken by Michael's behavior, Kyle ambushes him in the morning and ties him to a chair. Kyle and Sonia fall in love and work toward redemption, but Michael laughs at Kyle; he claims that Sonia's story of childhood sexual abuse is just an act, quoting a story he says she uses to seduce men.

Kyle and Sonia form a deeper relationship during the loops and make peace with their families. This causes the time loop to abruptly end, but they do not realize it until the next day in the middle of a violent rampage by Michael that ends with the senseless murders of two people. Freaked out, Michael takes Charlotte hostage, but he commits suicide after Kyle attempts to reason with him. Michael is surprised to wake up again, stuck in his own time loop, unsure if he can arrange peace with his own family to break the loop.

== Cast ==
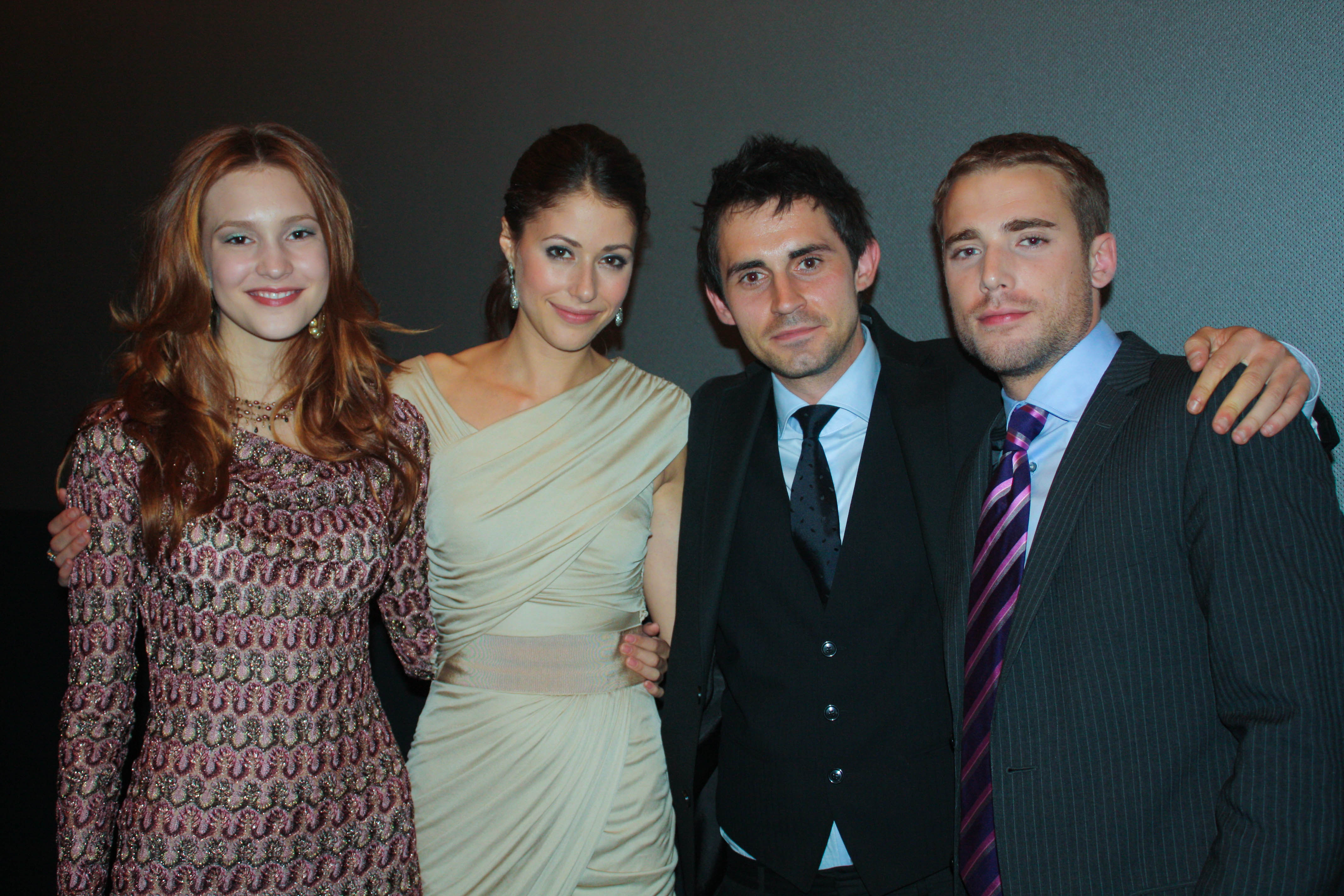
The cast of Repeaters at the Toronto International Film Festival (left to right): Alexia Fast, Amanda Crew, Richard de Klerk, and Dustin Milligan

- Dustin Milligan as Kyle Halsted
- Amanda Crew as Sonia Logan
- Richard de Klerk as Michael Weeks
- Alexia Fast as Charlotte Halsted
- Benjamin Ratner as Bob Simpson
- Tom Scholte as Sergeant Gerald Tibbs
- Gabrielle Rose as Peg Halsted
- Hrothgar Mathews as Ed Logan
- John Cassini as Lieutenant Howard
- Anja Savcic as Michelle
- Michael Adamthwaite as Tiko Taylor
- Manoj Sood as Mr. Singh
- John Tench as Weeks’ Father
- Michael Kopsa as Mr. Greeber
- Emily Perkins as Jumper

== Production ==
Shooting took place in Mission, British Columbia on January 11 to 31, 2010.

== Release ==
The film premiered at the Toronto International Film Festival. It was released on DVD August 9, 2011.

== Reception ==
Rotten Tomatoes, a review aggregator, reports that 20% of five surveyed critics gave it a positive review; the average rating was 4.2/10. Robert Koehler of Variety called it "a dead-serious version of Groundhog Day" that "brings little personal energy". Scott A. Gray of Exclaim! wrote that the film is not as preachy as expected, but it is still not the promised mindbender of the tagline. Joel Harley of Starburst rated it 8/10 stars and wrote that it is a cynical take on Groundhog Day, neither original nor too derivative to be enjoyed. Chris Knight of the National Post called it a complicated, intelligent, and elegant version of Groundhog Day that introduces more variables and selfish characters. Bruce DeMara of the Toronto Star rated it 3.5/4 stars and described it as "Groundhog Day but without the laughs and with a wild, cerebral spin." Kate Taylor of The Globe and Mail rated it 2.5/4 stars and called it "a small but interesting thriller" that "does not do full psychological justice to its clever premise".

== See also ==
- List of films featuring time loops
