= Nancy Sivak =

Nancy Sivak is a Canadian actress. She is most noted for her performance in the film Dirty, for which she won the Leo Award for Best Lead Actress in a Film in 1999.

At the Vancouver Film Critics Circle Awards 2000, she also received a dual nomination for Best Actress in a Canadian film for her performances in the films Protection and No More Monkeys Jumpin' on the Bed.

Originally from Edmonton, Alberta, Sivak has spent much of her career based in Vancouver, British Columbia. Her other credits have included the films Live Bait, Last Wedding, Living with the Dead, Everyone, Imaginary Playmate, Moving Malcolm, Mount Pleasant, Crimes of Mike Recket and Down River, guest roles in television, and stage performances in the Vancouver area. She has won two Jessie Richardson Theatre Awards for her stage performances.
