= Amazon Falls =

2010 film

- Film poster
- Directed by: Katrin Bowen
- Written by: Curry Hitchborn
- Produced by: Katrin Bowen
- Starring: April Telek; William B. Davis; Anna Mae Routledge; Zak Santiago
- Cinematography: Cliff Hokanson
- Edited by: Franco Pante
- Music by: Step Carruthers
- Release date: September 11, 2010 (TIFF)
- Running time: 90 minutes
- Country: Canada
- Language: English

Amazon Falls is a 2010 Canadian drama film directed by Katrin Bowen. The film stars April Telek as Jana, a faded B-movie actress. The story was based in part on Bowen's own experience as an aspiring actress, as well as by the shooting death of B-movie actress Lana Clarkson in 2003.

The cast also includes Anna Mae Routledge, Zak Santiago, William B. Davis, Gabrielle Rose, Tom Braidwood and Benjamin Ratner.

The film premiered at the 2010 Toronto International Film Festival.

The film received a Genie Award nomination for Best Makeup (Amber Makar) at the 32nd Genie Awards in 2011.
