= Lunch with Charles =

2001 Canadian-Hong Kong film by Michael Parker

- Directed by: Michael Parker
- Written by: Michael Parker
- Produced by: Michael Parker; Shan Tam
- Starring: Sean Lau; Theresa Lee; Nicholas Lea; Bif Naked; Tom Scholte
- Cinematography: John Houtman
- Edited by: Michelle Floyd; Grace Yuen
- Music by: Simon Kendall
- Production companies: WJ Film Productions; Foreign Exchange Films; Holiday Pictures
- Distributed by: Long Shong Entertainment Group
- Release date: January 14, 2001
- Running time: 94 minutes
- Countries: Canada; Hong Kong
- Languages: English; Cantonese

Lunch with Charles is a romantic comedy-drama film, directed by Michael Parker and released in 2001. A co-production of companies from Canada and Hong Kong, the film stars Sean Lau as Tong, a Hong Kong musician and businessman who has been living apart from his wife April (Theresa Lee) for three years due to his reluctance to join her when her career in public relations took her to Vancouver.

Believing that she is having an affair, he now travels to Vancouver to track her down, staying at a bed and breakfast run by Matthew (Nicholas Lea) and Natasha (Bif Naked), just as April is about to head to Banff with her client Tom (Tom Scholte) in hopes of signing a popular rock band to endorse his product, with Matthew, Natasha and Tong also following after the band's lead singer quits, and their manager Charles (Philip Granger), an old friend of Natasha's from her own days as a musician, calls and asks her to replace him.

The film won three Leo Awards in 2001, for Best Director (Parker), Best Screenwriter (Parker) and Best Musical Score (Simon Kendall), and was also nominated for Best Film, Best Actor (Lea), Best Cinematography (John Houtman), Best Production Design (Michael Bjornson). Kendall, Tom Landa and Geoffrey Kelly received a Genie Award nomination for Best Original Song at the 22nd Genie Awards in 2001 for the song "Parting Glass".
