= Every Mother's Worst Fear =

1998 American thriller film

- Written by: John Robert Bensink
- Directed by: Bill L. Norton
- Starring: Cheryl Ladd; Jordan Ladd; Ted McGinley; Robert Wisden
- Music by: Joseph Conlan
- Countries of origin: Canada; United States
- Original language: English

Production
- Producer: John L. Roman
- Cinematography: David Geddes
- Editor: Hibah Frisina
- Running time: 92 minutes
- Production company: Studios USA Pictures

Original release
- Release: August 19, 1998

Every Mother's Worst Fear is a 1998 American made-for-television thriller film starring Cheryl Ladd, Jordan Ladd and Ted McGinley. This film is a cautionary story of cyberspace, kidnapping and the dangers of chat rooms.

== Synopsis ==
Martha Hoagland is a 16-year-old girl suffering through her parents' recent divorce. Her mother is working long hours. Martha has recently been dumped by her high school boyfriend. Feeling lonely and seeking solace, Martha turns to an online chat room. Martha believes she is chatting with a young man who cares for her, when in reality she is chatting with Scanman, an internet predator involved in a cyber-kidnapping ring. Martha, who has told her online chat friend that she is 21, is lured to join her new "friend". When the investigation starts, he claims he never sent her a ticket. The police, the FBI, and an experienced computer hacker help Martha's mother Connie to rescue her 16-year-old daughter from the "Scanman."

== Cast ==
- Cheryl Ladd as Connie Hoagland
- Jordan Ladd as Martha Hoagland
- Robert Wisden as Jeff Hoagland
- Tom Butler as Agent Weatherby
- Ted McGinley as Scanman
- Blu Mankuma as Detective Maris
- Treat Williams as Mitch Carson (uncredited)
- Chiara Zanni as Sherry
- Vincent Gale as Drew Pederson
- Brendan Fehr as Alan
- Don Thompson as Martin Penny "Skokie"
