= Dirty (1998 film) =

- Directed by: Bruce Sweeney
- Written by: Bruce Sweeney
- Produced by: Bruce Sweeney; John Dippong; Linda Hay
- Starring: Babz Chula; Tom Scholte; Benjamin Ratner; Nancy Sivak
- Cinematography: David Pelletier
- Edited by: Ross Weber
- Music by: Don MacDonald
- Production company: Dirty Productions
- Release date: January 19, 1998 (Sundance)
- Running time: 94 minutes
- Country: Canada
- Language: English

Dirty is a Canadian comedy-drama film, directed by Bruce Sweeney and released in 1998. The film stars Babz Chula as Angie, a woman who deals marijuana out of her home in the Vancouver neighbourhood of Kitsilano, and Tom Scholte as David, a young university student with whom she has a sexual relationship.

The cast also includes Benjamin Ratner as Tony, David's roommate who has just moved to the city from Port Alberni and is feeling lonely and isolated as he tries to establish himself, and Nancy Sivak as Nancy, a depressed shopaholic woman who lives in Angie's basement apartment, as well as Vincent Gale, Frida Betrani, Abby J. Arnold, Rondel Reynoldson, Brendan Beiser, John Henry Canavan, Rob Carpenter, Fulvio Cecere, Marya Delver, Kathleen Duborg, Marcy Goldberg, George Gordon, Rebecca Harker and Micki Maunsell in supporting roles.

The film premiered on January 14, 1998, at the Sundance Film Festival. It had its Canadian premiere at the 1998 Toronto International Film Festival on September 14.

== Production ==
The film was developed through an improvisational process, with Sweeney and the cast working for about a year to develop their characters and flesh out the dialogue.

Sweeney acknowledged that the film had some semi-autobiographical aspects, based in part on incidents from his own life when he was a film student at Simon Fraser University. He also acknowledged that the film's darker themes were influenced by his having to undergo surgery to remove a blood clot from his brain soon after the release of his prior film Live Bait.

== Critical response ==
Emanuel Levy of Variety reviewed the film favourably, writing that "Sweeney appears to work in the serio-comic and psychological mode of John Cassavetes and Mike Leigh, a 1991 master class with the famed Brit director having reportedly influenced his own aesthetic sensibility. 'Dirty' lacks the depth and veracity of Leigh’s best films, but like them, it digs deep inside its characters and discloses the inner workings of their psyches in a revelatory, serio-comic style."

Katherine Monk of Southam News rated the film three stars, writing that "combined with Bruce Sweeney's economical and intuitive camera work, Dirty takes a relatively simple composition and turns it into a surreal, dark and somewhat disturbing picture of contemporary life. As a study of form, technique and emotional torture, Dirty is quite the coup. But as a film -- an increasingly mainstream medium that seems to demand visual cliches and classical dramatic pacing in order to be understood -- Dirty is a novelty that may be too challenging for most viewers."

Rick Groen of The Globe and Mail rated it two stars, writing that "Dirty tries to develop the ills of this fun bunch into a stark picture of misery's twin pillars, obsession and depression. Well, at least half the photo turns out -- watching all this is definitely depressing. I'm not suggesting that characters must be likable in order to be compelling -- even a pop confection like Seinfeld knew better than that. However, if the audience is to develop any empathy for them, something of their motivation and vulnerability and personal history needs to be explored, and precious little of that spadework gets done here."

== Awards ==
At the 1998 Vancouver International Film Festival, Sweeney won the award for Best Emerging Western Canadian Director.

At the 1999 Leo Awards, Sivak won the award for Best Lead Actress in a Film. The film was nominated in eight other categories, including Best Film, Best Direction, Best Screenwriting, Best Editing, Best Cinematography, and acting nods for Chula, Scholte and Ratner.
