= Tom Butler (actor) =

Canadian actor (born 1951)

- Born: Thomas Butler; 1 February 1951 (age 75); Ottawa, Ontario, Canada
- Education: National Theatre School of Canada
- Occupation: Actor
- Years active: 1978–present

Thomas Butler (born 1 February 1951) is a Canadian television and film actor.

== Early life and education ==
Butler was born in Ottawa, Ontario. In 1974, he graduated from the National Theatre School of Canada in Montreal, Quebec.

== Career ==
Stage

Butler has appeared on stage since the 1970s in theatre productions by the Toronto Free Theatre, Theatre Plus, Theatre Passe Muraille, Toronto Workshop Productions, Young People's Theatre, and Centaur Theatre. He has had roles in such plays as Shakespeare's The Taming of the Shrew, Bertolt Brecht's Saint Joan of the Stockyards, Arthur Miller's A View from the Bridge, Tom Stoppard's Night and Day, George F. Walker's Better Living, and other adaptations including Dead of Winter, and Gods of Money.

Screen

Butler is perhaps best known for his television role on the science fiction series Sliders as Michael Mallory, the father of Quinn Mallory in the pilot episode, and reprises his role in the season 2 episode "Gillian of the Spirits".

Butler has appeared in a number of theatrical films, including Head Office (1985), Renegades (1989), Ernest Rides Again (1993), Guilty as Sin (1993), and Everything Gone Green (2006). He also appears in Freddy vs. Jason (2003), and the Sonic the Hedgehog film series.

He appears in the television films as well, such as First Target (2000), and the Hallmark Channel film Autumn in the Vineyard (2016). Butler appeared in the television film Hostage Rescue Team (2001) as Special Agent David Nelson.

Butler appeared on television series such as Highlander: The Series, The Commish, The Outer Limits, Stargate SG-1, Smallville, Check It Out!, The Secret Circle, The Killing, and as a recurring character on Gracepoint. In 2013, he starred in an episode of the series Supernatural, playing Jim Myers.

== Filmography ==
=== Film ===
- Drying Up the Streets (1978) – Younger Cop
- Murder by Phone (1982) – Detective Tamblyn
- Head Office (1985) – Security Monitor
- The Climb (1986) – Willy Merkel
- Confidential (1986, Short) – Edmund Eislin
- Martha, Ruth and Edie (1988)
- Milk and Honey (1988) – Steven Wineberg
- Renegades (1989) – Detective Geddles
- Scanners II: The New Order (1991) – Doctor Morse
- Guilty as Sin (1993) – D.A. Heath
- Ernest Rides Again (1993) – Dr. Radnor T. Glencliff
- Red Sun Rising (1994) – Mercenary
- Death Match (1994) – Fighter
- ...First Do No Harm (1997) – Dr Jim Peterson
- Question of Privilege (1999) – Tate Aldridge
- Legs Apart (2000, Short) – Lawyer
- Josie and the Pussycats (2001) – Agent Kelly
- Freddy vs. Jason (2003) – Dr. Campbell
- I Accuse (2003) – Warren Hart
- Miracle (2004) – Bob Allen
- The Score (2005) – JP Martineau
- Snakes on a Plane (2006) – Captain Sam McKeon
- Everything Gone Green (2006) – Ryan's Dad
- Code Name: The Cleaner (2007) – Crane
- Shooter (2007) – President
- That One Night (2008) – Mr. Wilcox
- Crime (2008) – Coach
- The A-Team (2010) – Judge Advocate #1
- The Dick Knost Show (2013) – Matt
- Primary (2014) – Karl Jaspar
- Fifty Shades of Grey (2015) – WSU University President
- Tomorrowland (2015) – Police Captain
- Working Class Heroes (2015, Short) – Derrick
- Sonic the Hedgehog (2020) – Vice Chairman Walters
- Sonic the Hedgehog 2 (2022) – Commander Walters
- She Talks to Strangers (2023) – Larry
- Sonic the Hedgehog 3 (2024) – Commander Walters

=== Television ===
Tom Butler television credits
Year	Title	Role	Notes	Ref.
1979	Cementhead	Bear	2 episodes	
1980	Jack London's Tales of the Klondike	Floyd Vanderlip	Scorn of Women episode	
1980–1984	The Littlest Hobo	Coach	3 episodes	
1985	Murder in Space	Maj. Kurt Steiner	TV movie	
1986	The High Price of Passion	Security Man	TV movie	
1987	Walking on Air	Bill Pearson	TV movie	
1987	Ghost of a Chance	Detective Ed Rose	TV movie	
1989	Day One	Captain DeSilva	TV movie	
1989	Bridge to Silence	Attorney McHally	TV movie	
1989	Small Sacrifices	Unknown	TV miniseries	
1990	Hitler's Daughter	Dolan	TV movie	
1992	The Diamond Fleece	Gordon Pritchard	TV movie	
1992	Counterstrike	Traeger	Episode: "D.O.A."	
1993	Ordeal in the Arctic	Arnie Macauley	TV movie	
1993	Judgment Day: The John List Story	Michael Linder	TV movie	
1993	The Commish	Pete Dunbar	2 episodes	
1993	The X-Files	Benjamin Drake	Episode: "Ghost in the Machine"	
1994	Race to Freedom: The Underground Railroad	Unknown	TV movie	
1994	Beyond Obsession	Jeremy Stevens	TV movie	
1994	Green Dolphin Beat	Roy Maines	TV movie	
1994	The Disappearance of Vonnie	D.A. DeLion	TV movie	
1994	Against Their Will: Women in Prison	Defense Attorney	TV movie	
1994	Someone Else's Child	Bruce Reed	TV movie	
1995	The X-Files	CIA Agent Ambrose Chapel	Episode: "Colony"	
1995	Falling from the Sky: Flight 174	Pilot Dave	TV movie	
1995	The Outer Limits	Charlie Rogers	Episode "Valerie 23"	
1995	The Outer Limits	Mr. Evans	Episode "The Conversion"	
1995	The Ranger, the Cook and a Hole in the Sky	Mr. McBride	TV movie	
1996	The Outer Limits	Dr. Werner	Episode "Straight and Narrow"	
1996	Maternal Instincts	Dr. Milton Shaw	TV movie	
1996	Robin of Locksley	John Prince Sr.	TV movie	
1997	...First Do No Harm	Dr. Jim Peterson	TV movie	
1997	Ronnie & Julie	Arthur Cappell	TV movie	
1997	High Stakes	Krueger	TV movie	
1997	Ken Follett's The Third Twin	Col. Colonel Logan	TV movie	
1997	Medusa's Child	General Alton	TV movie	
1997–1998	Poltergeist: The Legacy	Frank Karmack	4 episodes	
1997–1998	Viper	Miles Devonian / Quincy Simon	2 episodes	
1998	The Long Way Home	Peat Gerrin	TV movie	
1998	Oklahoma City: A Survivor's Story	Unknown	TV movie	
1998	Every Mother's Worst Fear	Agent Weatherly	TV movie	
1998	Dead Man's Gun	Sheriff Harrigan / William Harris	2 episodes	
1998	Animorphs	Governor	1 episodes	
1998	The Outer Limits	Charlie Bouton	Episode "Mary 25"	
2000	Life-Size	Phil	TV movie	
2000	First Target	Senator Jack "JP" Hunter	TV movie	
2003	A Crime of Passion	Thomas Shipman	TV movie	
2003	A Date with Darkness: The Trial and Capture of Andrew Lusterr	Roger Diamond	TV movie	
2005	Smallville	Lawrence Grady	1 episodes	
2006	Blade: The Series	Tucker Moffot	2 episodes	
2007	Masters of Science Fiction	Warren Geslow	1 episode. AKA Stephen Hawkin's Sci Fi Masters	
2008	Making Mr. Right	Paul Gottman	TV movie	
2010	One Angry Juror	Fitzgerald	TV movie	
2010	Call Me Mrs. Miracle	J.R. Finley	TV movie	
2011	Goodnight for Justice	Judge Aldous Shaw	TV movie	
2011–2012	The Killing	Mayor Lesley Adams	Recurring role	
2012	Primeval: New World	Drake	1 episode	
2012	Fringe	Richard	Episode "Black Blotter"	
2013	The Dick Knost Show	Matt	TV movie	
2013	The Toyman Killer	Detective Turbinado	TV movie	
2014	Supernatural	Jim Meyers	1 episode	
2014	Intruders	Brad Zimmerman	3 episodes	
2014	Gracepoint	Chief Morgan	TV miniseries	
2015	The Whispers	Daniel Goetz	3 episodes	
2015	Cedar Cove	Buck Saget	9 episodes	
2015	The Flash	Eric Larkin	2 episodes	
2015	Minority Report	Senator Tyler Reynolds	2 episodes	
2016	Love in Paradise	Casey Twain	TV movie	
2016	Anything for Love	Edward	TV movie	
2016	Zoo	Greg Trotter	9 episodes	
2016	Autumn in the Vineyard	Charles Baldwin	TV movie	
2016–2018	Chesapeake Shores	Lawrence Riley	Recurring role	
2017	Rogue	Monty Annou	Recurring role	
2017	Damnation	Burt Babbage	3 episodes	
2017-2020	Loudermilk	Jack Loudermilk	Recurring role	
2018	Morning Show Mystery: Mortal Mishaps	Vernon Divoss	TV movie	
2018	Morning Show Mystery: Murder on the Menu	Vernon Divoss	TV movie	
2018	Hailey Dean Mystery: 2 + 2 = Murder	Lucas Dean	TV movie	
2018	Salvation	Speaker Barnes	2 episodes	
2019	A Godwink Christmas: Meant for Love	Edgar	TV movie	
2021	Christmas in Tahoe	Tim Rhodes	TV movie	
