= She Talks to Strangers =

2023 Canadian comedy-drama film

- Directed by: Bruce Sweeney
- Written by: Bruce Sweeney
- Produced by: Ali Froggatt; Jeff Gladstone; Tracy Major; Bruce Sweeney; Rafi Spivak; David Pelletier
- Starring: Camille Sullivan; Jeff Gladstone; Gabrielle Rose
- Cinematography: Callum Middleton
- Edited by: Rafi Spivak
- Music by: James Jandrisch
- Production company: Carkner Films
- Release date: December 1, 2023 (WFF)
- Running time: 91 minutes
- Country: Canada
- Language: English

She Talks to Strangers is a Canadian comedy-drama film, written and directed by Bruce Sweeney and released in 2023. The film stars Camille Sullivan as Leslie, a woman who has been separated for a number of years but not legally divorced from her husband Keith (Jeff Gladstone); one day, however, Keith returns to hide out in her basement from people to whom he owes money, but with the secret intention to reestablish his ownership rights in the home so that he can make quick money by forcing her to sell it and give him half the money, thus forcing Leslie to team up with her mother Staci (Gabrielle Rose), with whom she also has a tense and difficult relationship, to figure out how to get rid of him.

The cast also includes Agam Darshi, Paul Skrudland, Laara Sadiq, Juan Riedinger, Raphael Kepinski, Cam Cronin, Mark Chavez, Tom Butler, Ali Froggatt, Jillian Fargey, Keertika Gupta, Tibet Karayazgan and Kevin McNulty.

== Distribution ==
The film premiered in the Borsos Competition program at the 2023 Whistler Film Festival.

== Critical response ==
Shaun Lang of Hollywood North magazine rated the film 6 out of 10, writing that "Strangers strikes me as one of those indie films that may have functioned better as a one-act fringe play than a feature film. The characters are fascinating to watch even if no one really learns anything or changes in any meaningful way. Cinematic equivalent of that restaurant your friend drags you to that certainly tastes interesting, but is unlikely to merit a return visit."

== Awards ==
The film received two Leo Award nominations in 2024, for Best Lead Performance in a Feature Film (Rose) and Best Screenplay for a Motion Picture (Sweeney).
