= Meltdown (2004 film) =

2004 American television film

- Promotional poster
- Genre: Science fiction; Action thriller
- Written by: Larry Barber; Paul Barber
- Directed by: Jeremiah S. Chechik
- Starring: Bruce Greenwood; Leslie Hope; Arnold Vosloo
- Music by: Tomandandy
- Country of origin: United States
- Original languages: English; Arabic

Production
- Executive producers: Beth Grossbard; Craig Anderson
- Producers: Jan Korbelin; Stephen Lillis
- Cinematography: Douglas Koch
- Editor: Bruce Cannon
- Running time: 90 minutes
- Production companies: Apollo Screen Productions; Pacific Coast Productions; Visitor Entertainment

Original release
- Network: FX
- Release: June 6, 2004

Meltdown (also known as American Meltdown) is a 2004 American action-thriller television film directed by Jeremiah S. Chechik and written by Larry and Paul Barber. The film stars Bruce Greenwood, Leslie Hope and Arnold Vosloo, and depicts a terrorist takeover of the San Onofre Nuclear Generating Station, a nuclear power plant in Southern California. It aired on FX on June 6, 2004.

== Cast ==
- Bruce Greenwood as Agent Tom Shea
- Leslie Hope as Zoe Cox
- Arnold Vosloo as Khalid / Sands
- James Remar as Colonel Boggs
- Susan Merson as Attorney General Zutrow
- Will Lyman as Homeland Chief Utley
- Bill Mondy as FBI Agent Tucci
- Brent Stait as FBI Commander Hall
- Adrian Holmes as Agent Charlie Jansen
- Manoj Sood as Syed Kahn
- Tony Alcantar as Reactor Tech Chuck Pasquin
- Diego Diablo Del Mar as Marwan / Raul (as Diego Del Mar)
- Alessandro Juliani as Salem / Emmett
- Darren Shahlavi as Waleed / Frank
- David Neale as Shafig / Jesse
