= Ignition (film) =

2001 film directed by Yves Simoneau

- Directed by: Yves Simoneau
- Written by: William Davies
- Produced by: Thomas Hedman; Lisa Richardson
- Starring: Bill Pullman; Lena Olin; Colm Feore; Michael Ironside; Peter Kent; Barbara Eve Harris; Nicholas Lea; Hrothgar Mathews; Roger Dunn; Benjamin Ratner; Lori Ann Triolo
- Cinematography: Jonathan Freeman
- Edited by: Yves Langlois
- Music by: Richard Grégoire; François Lamoureux
- Distributed by: Lionsgate
- Release date: 2001 (U.S.)
- Running time: 99 minutes (Theatrical); 96 minutes (Spanish version)
- Countries: Canada; United States
- Language: English

Ignition is a 2001 action film written by William Davies and directed by Yves Simoneau.

== Plot ==
NASA is about to launch a rocket to put a man on the moon, but corrupt high-ranking military officials plot to assassinate the president over budget cuts.
