= Crimes of Mike Recket =

2012 film

- Directed by: Bruce Sweeney
- Written by: Bruce Sweeney
- Produced by: Bruce Sweeney; Rafi Spivak
- Starring: Nicholas Lea; Agam Darshi; Gabrielle Rose
- Cinematography: Filip Dobosz
- Edited by: Rafi Spivak
- Music by: Dennis Burke
- Production company: Carkner Films
- Release date: September 11, 2012 (TIFF)
- Running time: 79 minutes
- Country: Canada
- Language: English

Crimes of Mike Recket is a Canadian crime drama film, written and directed by Bruce Sweeney and released in 2012. The film stars Nicholas Lea as Mike Recket, a real estate developer in Vancouver, British Columbia, whose bad business decisions have left him in deep debt; kicked out of the house by his wife Jasleen (Agam Darshi), he hits upon a scheme to revive his fortune by defrauding wealthy widow Leslie Klemper (Gabrielle Rose), only to become a criminal suspect when Leslie goes missing.

The film's cast also includes Paul Skrudland, Jillian Fargey, Raphael Kepinski, Tom Scholte, John Cassini, Paul Anthony, Jeff Carter, Cam Cronin, Ryan MacDonald, Nancy Sivak and Alex Zahara.

Sweeney acknowledged that the film incorporated aspects of the film noir genre, although he stated that he had tried to subvert the genre, notably by avoiding the classic film noir trope of the femme fatale and introducing some moments of comedic levity.

The film premiered at the 2012 Toronto International Film Festival, although due to production delays it was still in post-production just days before its premiere.

== Critical response ==
Glen Schaefer of The Province called the film "a playful, deadpan and distinctly Vancouver take on noir archetypes".

Tim Grierson of Screen Daily reviewed the film negatively, writing that "Sweeney seems to want to satirize the laser-like focus and keen intellect of police officers on cop shows and crime films, but the tepid comic situations and reserved performances conspire to create a humour vacuum — the movie starts to resemble a lobotomised version of a standard police drama."

== Awards ==
Darshi won the Leo Award for Best Supporting Actress in a Motion Picture in 2013. Sweeney was also nominated for Best Direction in a Motion Picture, and Rose was nominated for Best Leading Actress in a Motion Picture.

Rose won the award for Best Actress from the Vancouver chapter of the ACTRA Awards in 2013.
