= Benjamin Immanuel =

Actor

Benjamin Immanuel (also credited as Ben Ratner or Benjamin Ratner) is a Canadian actor, film director and screenwriter. He is most noted for his performances in the films Last Wedding and Looking for Leonard.

== Career ==
Immanuel has appeared in the films Moving Malcolm, Ignition, Long Life, Happiness & Prosperity, Amazon Falls, Fathers & Sons and Sisters & Brothers, and regular supporting roles as Sam Berger in the television series Da Vinci's City Hall and Ivon Teslia in Travelers. He was also the director of Moving Malcolm.

For his role in Last Wedding, he won a Vancouver Film Critics Circle award for Best Actor in a Canadian Film in 2001. He won the VFCC's Best Supporting Actor in a Canadian Film award in 2002 for Looking for Leonard. He was also director of the film Down River, which won the VFCC's award for Best British Columbia film in 2013.

== Personal life ==
In 2021, having been credited as Benjamin Ratner or Ben Ratner since 1991, he chose to start using his middle name for future credits, thus Ben Immanuel, in order to avoid confusion with director Brett Ratner. He is married to actress Jennifer Spence.

== Filmography ==
=== Film ===
| Year | Title | Role | Notes |
|---|---|---|---|
| 1992 | Leaving Normal | Next Nearest Guy | |
| 1993 | Tomcat: Dangerous Desires | Fred | |
| 1995 | Magic in the Water | FX Man | |
| 1995 | Midnight Heat | Agent | |
| 1995 | For a Few Lousy Dollars | Danny | |
| 1995 | Crash | Ellis | |
| 1996 | White Tiger | Cordero | |
| 1996 | Bounty Hunters | Deimos | |
| 1996 | Profile for Murder | Tony the Coroner | |
| 1998 | Firestorm | Wilkins | |
| 1998 | Dirty | Tony | |
| 1998 | Wrongfully Accused | Sergeant Orono | |
| 1998 | American Dragons | Angelo | |
| 1998 | Zacharia Farted | Brian Moore | |
| 1999 | Question of Privilege | Owen Kerr | |
| 2001 | Last Wedding | Noah | |
| 2001 | Ignition | Agent Webber | |
| 2001 | Shot in the Face | Brian | |
| 2002 | Looking for Leonard | Ted | |
| 2002 | Long Life, Happiness & Prosperity | Ernie the Manager | |
| 2002 | 19 Months | Rob | |
| 2003 | A Guy Thing | Officer | |
| 2003 | Agent Cody Banks | McAllister | |
| 2003 | Moving Malcolm | Gene Maxwell | |
| 2003 | See Grace Fly | Ralph | |
| 2003 | A Problem with Fear | Alan | |
| 2003 | Good Boy! | Wilson's Dad | |
| 2005 | Severed | Ray | |
| 2006 | Man About Town | Dr. Kevin Sands | |
| 2006 | Expiration Date | Lazar | |
| 2006 | Mount Pleasant | Doug Cameron | |
| 2006 | Gray Matters | Derek | |
| 2007 | Numb | Stan Milbank | |
| 2007 | American Venus | Cabbie | |
| 2007 | Normal | Tim | |
| 2008 | Mothers & Daughters | Benjamin | |
| 2010 | Amazon Falls | Derek Grayson | |
| 2010 | Repeaters | Bob Simpson | |
| 2010 | Fathers & Sons | Bernie | |
| 2010 | Guido Superstar: The Rise of Guido | Cabbie | |
| 2011 | Knockout | Mr. Doyle | |
| 2011 | Sisters & Brothers | Jerry | |
| 2015 | Badge of Honor | Coroner | |
| 2017 | Wonder | Mr. Davenport | |
| 2019 | A Dog's Way Home | Dr. Gann | |
| 2024 | Can I Get a Witness? | Peter | |

=== Television ===
| Year | Title | Role | Notes |
|---|---|---|---|
| 1993 | Street Justice | Sylvan | Episode: "Desperate" |
| 1994 | Cobra | Jorge Scardino | Episode: "Lorinda" |
| 1995 | M.A.N.T.I.S. | Assistant M.E. | Episode: "Switches" |
| 1995 | The Commish | Willard | 2 episodes |
| 1995 | Strange Luck | Rob Gold | Episode: "Trial Period" |
| 1995 | Madison | Matt | Episode: "On the Road" |
| 1995, 1996 | The Outer Limits | Blanco / Electrician | 2 episodes |
| 1996 | Highlander: The Series | Bryce Korland | Episode: "Something Wicked" |
| 1996 | A Kidnapping in the Family | Dan Calder | Television film |
| 1996 | Sliders | Tommy Greenfeld | Episode: "Greatfellas" |
| 1996 | Poltergeist: The Legacy | Kyle's Attorney | Episode: "The Tenement" |
| 1996 | The Limbic Region | Handwriting Expert | Television film |
| 1996 | Once a Thief | Moran | Television film |
| 1996 | Once a Thief | Moran | Episode: "Once a Thief" |
| 1996 | Susie Q | T.V. Director | Television film |
| 1996 | Justice on Wheels | Levy | Television film |
| 1996 | Fall into Darkness | John Richmond | Television film |
| 1996 | An Unexpected Family | Harry Weinstock | Television film |
| 1997 | The Sentinel | Sneaks | Episode: "Blind Man's Bluff" |
| 1997 | Contagious | Rick Shaffer | Television film |
| 1997 | Alibi | Stuart Ridgeway | Television film |
| 1997 | Indefensible: The Truth About Edward Brannigan | Paul Suarez | Television film |
| 1998 | An Unexpected Life | Harry Weinstock | Television film |
| 1998 | Becker | Mr. Hernick | Episode: "Choose Me" |
| 1999, 2001 | Seven Days | David Harold / Walter | 2 episodes |
| 2000 | Beggars and Choosers | Will | Episode: "Russian Roulette" |
| 2000 | Cover Me | Gangster | Episode: "Bazooka Joe" |
| 2000 | Da Vinci's Inquest | Jerome | Episode: "An Act of God" |
| 2001 | The Immortal | Ashur | Episode: "The Good Squire" |
| 2001 | Mysterious Ways | Ben Cameron | Episode: "Spike" |
| 2001, 2006 | Stargate SG-1 | Dr. Hutchison / Producer | 2 episodes |
| 2002 | The Twilight Zone | Lafe Narz | Episode: "Dream Lover" |
| 2002, 2006 | The Dead Zone | Boyd Lumely / Gabriel Barnes | 2 episodes |
| 2003 | The Stranger Beside Me | Joe Foley | Television film |
| 2004 | Kingdom Hospital | Ollie | 10 episodes |
| 2004 | Smallville | Hanison | Episode: "Run" |
| 2005 | The Collector | Steve Green | Episode: "The Comic" |
| 2005 | Robson Arms | Guy at Restaurant | Episode: "The Tell-Tale Latex" |
| 2005–2006 | Da Vinci's City Hall | Sam Berger | 13 episodes |
| 2007 | Supernatural | Walter Dixon | Episode: "Hollywood Babylon" |
| 2008 | The L Word | Suit #1 / Dan | Episode: "Loyal and True" |
| 2008 | The Quality of Life | Sam Berger | Television film |
| 2008 | Rabbit Fall | Joseph Hopper | Episode: "Happiness Hotel" |
| 2009 | Defying Gravity | Surgeon | Episode: "Bacon" |
| 2011 | The Haunting Hour: The Series | Chris' Dad | Episode: "Afraid of Clowns" |
| 2011 | Endgame | Mr. Black / Dennis Grovener | Episode: "Mr. Black |
| 2011 | Flashpoint | Tony Kramkov / Alexi Kanisky | Episode: "Shockwave" |
| 2011, 2012 | Eureka | Dr. Fung | 2 episodes |
| 2013 | Arctic Air | Max | Episode: "Stormy Weather" |
| 2013 | Hell on Wheels | Clement Beale | Episode: "Big Bad Wolf" |
| 2014–2015 | Continuum | Gord Solomon | 3 episodes |
| 2015 | The Unauthorized Full House Story | Alan | Television film |
| 2018 | Travelers | Dr. Ivon Teslia | 7 episodes |
| 2019 | The Man in the High Castle | Erwin | Episode: "Hitler Has Only Got One Ball" (Season 4, Episode 8) |
