= The Escape (1998 film) =

1998 Canadian action TV film

- Written by: Scott Busby
- Directed by: Stuart Gillard
- Starring: Patrick Dempsey
- Music by: Loek Dikker
- Countries of origin: Canada; United States
- Original language: English

Production
- Producers: George Horie; Frank Mancuso Jr. Tom Rowe; Michael Sheehy
- Cinematography: Tobias A. Schliessler
- Editor: Rick Martin
- Running time: 91 minutes
- Production companies: MGM Television; Pacific Motion Pictures; Showtime Networks

Original release
- Release: April 24, 1998

The Escape is a 1998 Canadian-American action TV movie directed by Stuart Gillard starring Patrick Dempsey.

== Plot ==
A falsely imprisoned young man attempts an escape from a prison work detail in Louisiana ten years later.

== Cast ==
- Patrick Dempsey as Clayton
- Brigitte Bako as Sarah
- Colm Feore as Hickman
- Vincent Gale as Newby
- Nathaniel DeVeaux as Moses
- Gouchy Boy as Pooch
- Jason Gray-Stanford as Young Guard

== Release ==
The film bears a 1994 copyright but it was not until 1998 that it aired on The Movie Channel and was then released on home video.

== Home video ==
The film was released on VHS for home video release on October 13, 1998. It was later released for streaming on Netflix and Amazon Video.
