= Normal (2007 film) =

2007 film by Carl Bessai

- Theatrical release poster
- Directed by: Carl Bessai
- Written by: Carl Bessai; Travis McDonald
- Produced by: Carl Bessai
- Starring: Carrie-Anne Moss; Kevin Zegers; Callum Keith Rennie; Andrew Airlie; Tygh Runyan; Camille Sullivan; Lauren Lee Smith; Michael Riley; Britt Irvin; Allison Hossack; Cameron Bright
- Cinematography: Carl Bessai
- Edited by: Lisa Binkley
- Music by: Clinton Shorter
- Distributed by: Mongrel Media
- Release date: September 10, 2007
- Running time: 100 minutes
- Country: Canada
- Language: English

Normal is a 2007 Canadian drama film about a group of unrelated people who are brought together in the wake of a deadly car crash. The film was directed by Carl Bessai, and stars Carrie-Anne Moss, Kevin Zegers, Callum Keith Rennie and Andrew Airlie.

== Plot ==
A car accident results in the death of sixteen year old Nickie Reichert, the passenger in one of the cars involved. Two years after the accident, three families are still profoundly feeling the effects of the devastating event.

Nickie's mother, Catherine Reichert, can't get over the grief of losing her eldest son. She refuses to let anyone touch Nickie's things, which still lay as is in their home. Catherine's grief results in her neglecting her husband, Dale Reichert, and their younger son, Brady Reichert, who lives in Nickie's shadow.

College professor Walter Braugher, the drunk driver in the other car, was found not criminally negligent of the accident. He has self doubts about his life, which manifests itself in his drinking. Since the accident, he has been having trouble relating to his wife, Abby, and looks for solace from Sherri Banks, one of his students. Also in the car that night was his autistic brother, Dennis Braugher, who has not been able to leave his apartment since due to fear.

And Nickie's friend, Jordie, was the driver of the stolen car in which the two were traveling. Jordie has just been released from the Youth Detention Centre, where he's been housed since for the theft. He has become a sullen young man. His father, a psychotherapist named Carl, hasn't forgiven Jordie for that night, which in turn has affected Carl's relationship with his second wife/Jordie's stepmother, Elise. Jordie and Elise want to feel loved again.

== Cast ==
- Carrie-Anne Moss as Catherine
- Kevin Zegers as Jordie
- Callum Keith Rennie as Walt Braugher
- Andrew Airlie as Dale
- Tygh Runyan as Dennis Braugher
- Camille Sullivan as Elise
- Lauren Lee Smith as Sherri Banks
- Michael Riley as Carl
- Brittney Irvin as Melissa
- Allison Hossack as Abby
- Cameron Bright as Brady
- Tara Frederick as Sylvie Farber
- Benjamin Ratner as Tim
- Zak Santiago as Bob the Social Worker
- Hrothgar Mathews as Jerry

== Awards ==
Rennie won the Genie Award for Best Supporting Actor at the 29th Genie Awards. The film was also a nominee for Best Picture, but lost to Passchendaele.

It won the award for Best Western Canadian Film at the 2007 Vancouver International Film Festival.

== Reception ==
On the review aggregator website Rotten Tomatoes, 0% of five critics' reviews are positive, with an average rating of 4.3/10.
