= The Date (1992 film) =

- Directed by: Nikos Theodosakis
- Written by: Linda Theodosakis
- Produced by: Nikos Theodosakis; Linda Theodosakis
- Starring: Scott Anderson; Michelle Bardeaux; Jay Brazeau; Babz Chula
- Cinematography: Charles LaVack
- Edited by: Debra Rurak
- Release date: October 1992 (VIFF)
- Running time: 29 minutes
- Country: Canada
- Language: English

The Date is a Canadian short comedy-drama film, directed by Nikos Theodosakis and released in 1992. The film centres on Scott (Scott Anderson), a young man who has arrived at his girlfriend Carmen's (Michelle Bardeaux) home to pick her up for a date, but who is being interrogated and stonewalled by Carmen's parents (Jay Brazeau and Babz Chula).

The film was written by Linda Theodosakis, the director's wife, as their first-ever film project, and was made over a period of 36 months in between concentrating on running a Greek cuisine restaurant in Penticton. They commenced work on the film after attending the Vancouver International Film Festival in 1989, and began shooting in 1990.

The film premiered at the 1992 Vancouver International Film Festival.

The film was a Genie Award nominee for Best Live Action Short Drama at the 14th Genie Awards in 1993.
