= Last Wedding =

2001 film by Bruce Sweeney

- DVD cover
- Directed by: Bruce Sweeney
- Written by: Bruce Sweeney
- Produced by: Stephen Hegyes
- Starring: Benjamin Ratner; Frida Betrani; Tom Scholte
- Cinematography: David Pelletier
- Edited by: Ross Weber
- Music by: Don MacDonald
- Production company: Last Wedding Productions
- Distributed by: THINKFilm; Velocity Home Entertainment
- Release date: September 6, 2001 (TIFF)
- Running time: 100 minutes
- Country: Canada
- Language: English

Last Wedding is a 2001 Canadian comedy-drama film written and directed by Bruce Sweeney.

It premiered as the opening film of the 2001 Toronto International Film Festival.

== Plot summary ==
Noah, a weatherproofing specialist, is preparing to marry Zipporah, a country music singer. His best friend, Peter, is a Canadian literature professor whose relationship with librarian Leslie is threatened by the arrival of beautiful student Laurel. Meanwhile, Noah's and Peter's other close friend Shane, is an architect who has a seemingly wonderful relationship with Sarah, until she graduates and lands a better job than the one he has.

== Cast ==
- Benjamin Ratner as Noah
- Frida Betrani as Zipporah
- Tom Scholte as Peter
- Nancy Sivak as Leslie
- Vincent Gale as Shane
- Molly Parker as Sarah
- Marya Delver as Laurel
- Jay Brazeau as Noah's father
- Kevin McNulty as Rabbi
- Jillian Fargey as Record company assistant

== Awards ==
Award	Ceremony	Category	Recipient(s)	Result	Ref(s)
Genie Awards	22nd Genie Awards	Best Supporting Actor	Vincent Gale	Won	
Genie Awards	22nd Genie Awards	Best Supporting Actor	Tom Scholte	Nominated	
Genie Awards	22nd Genie Awards	Best Supporting Actress	Molly Parker	Won	
Genie Awards	22nd Genie Awards	Best Supporting Actress	Marya Delver	Nominated	
Genie Awards	22nd Genie Awards	Best Art Direction or Production Design	Tony Devenyi	Nominated	
Genie Awards	22nd Genie Awards	Best Editing	Ross Weber	Nominated	
Toronto Film Critics Association	Toronto Film Critics Association Awards 2001	Rogers Best Canadian Film Award	Last Wedding	Won	
Vancouver Film Critics Circle	Vancouver Film Critics Circle Awards 2001	Best Canadian Film	Last Wedding	Won	
Vancouver Film Critics Circle	Vancouver Film Critics Circle Awards 2001	Best Actor in a Canadian Film	Benjamin Ratner	Won	
Vancouver Film Critics Circle	Vancouver Film Critics Circle Awards 2001	Best Actress in a Canadian Film	Frida Betrani	Won	
Vancouver Film Critics Circle	Vancouver Film Critics Circle Awards 2001	Best Director of a Canadian Film	Bruce Sweeney	Won	
