= The Dick Knost Show =

2013 film

- Directed by: Bruce Sweeney
- Written by: Bruce Sweeney
- Starring: Tom Scholte
- Cinematography: Filip Dobosz
- Release date: 10 September 2013 (TIFF)
- Running time: 90 minutes
- Country: Canada
- Language: English

The Dick Knost Show is a 2013 Canadian comedy film written and directed by Bruce Sweeney. The film stars Tom Scholte as Dick Knost, an opinionated loudmouth sports broadcaster who undergoes a personal transformation after suffering a concussion.

It premiered in the Contemporary World Cinema section at the 2013 Toronto International Film Festival. It also won Best BC Film at the Vancouver International Film Festival.

== Cast ==
- Tom Butler
- John Cassini as David
- Jillian Fargey
- David Lovgren
- Gabrielle Rose as Kelly
- Laara Sadiq
- Zak Santiago
- Tom Scholte
- Paul Skrudland
- Alexandra Staseson
- Qelsey Zeeper
