= Aim for the Roses =

2019 documentary

- Directed by: John Bolton
- Produced by: John Bolton; Naomi Mark
- Cinematography: Vince Arvidson
- Edited by: Brendan Woollard
- Music by: Mark Haney
- Production company: Opus 59 Films
- Distributed by: Blue Ice Docs; Monoduo Films
- Release date: May 1, 2016 ( Hot Docs International Documentary Festival)
- Running time: 102 minutes
- Country: Canada
- Language: English

Aim for the Roses is a 2016 Canadian documentary and musical docudrama about Canadian stuntdriver and daredevil Ken Carter's attempt to jump the St. Lawrence River in a rocket-powered car, and the concept album it inspired. The film was written, directed and produced by John Bolton, and features the music of composer Mark Haney. It premiered at the 2016 Hot Docs International Documentary Festival and was the opening night film at the 2016 DOXA Documentary Film Festival.

== Summary ==
In 1976, professional stuntdriver Ken Carter announced his plan to undertake his most ambitious stunt yet: an attempt to jump a mile over the St. Lawrence Seaway in a rocket-powered Lincoln Continental. In 2008, Canadian musician and composer, Mark Haney paid tribute to Ken Carter by making a concept album about the stunt. In 2014, it was announced that filmmaker John Bolton was making a movie about these two seemingly disparate moments of Canadian cultural history. On October 8, 2014, it was announced that filming had wrapped.

Using archival footage from the actual stunt combined with elaborately choreographed musical numbers, Aim for the Roses links these two very different men by drawing parallels between each man's passions and obsessions: Haney's work as a composer and Carter's work as a daredevil. Described as "part documentary, part re-enactment, part music video", the film shows the sacrifices and risks each man takes in the pursuit of unlikely goals. Bolton himself becomes a third character in the story, and the film also serves as a record of his obsessive journey to complete the film.

== Release ==
Aim for the Roses had its world premiere May 1, 2016 at the Hot Docs International Documentary Festival and was the opening night film at the DOXA Documentary Film Festival on May 5, 2016. This was followed by screenings at numerous other International Film Festivals including RIDM in Montreal and Docville in Belgium. The film was released in theatres across Canada including at the VIFF Centre in Vancouver, and the Mayfair theatre in Ottawa. The film is available to stream on Apple TV.

== Critical reception ==
Norm Wilner of NOW Magazine gave Aim for the Roses five out of five stars and called the movie "experimental and conventional at the same time: a concept movie about a concept album. It’s delightful."
