= Moving Malcolm =

- Directed by: Benjamin Ratner
- Written by: Benjamin Ratner
- Produced by: Benjamin Ratner; Paul Armstrong; Bridget Hill
- Starring: Benjamin Ratner; Elizabeth Berkley; John Neville; Jay Brazeau; Babz Chula
- Cinematography: Gregory Middleton
- Edited by: Ross Weber
- Music by: Chris Ainscough
- Release date: August 30, 2003 (MWFF)
- Running time: 83 minutes
- Country: Canada
- Language: English
- Budget: $1,000,000 Cdn (estimated)

Moving Malcolm is a Canadian comedy-drama film, directed by Benjamin Ratner and released in 2003.

The film stars Ratner as Gene Maxwell, a man who is forced to piece his life back together after being dumped at the altar by his fiancée Liz (Elizabeth Berkley), but is asked after the wedding to help her move her father Malcolm (John Neville) to a new apartment in a seniors home. The cast also includes Jay Brazeau and Babz Chula as Gene's parents George and Gisha and Rebecca Harker as his autistic sister Jolea, as well as Linda Sorenson, Nicholas Lea, Nancy Sivak and Tom Scholte in supporting roles.

Ratner acknowledged that the film was partially autobiographical; although Ratner was never personally jilted by a fiancée, he based Gene Maxwell's family on his own.

The film premiered at the 2003 Montreal World Film Festival, where it received an honorable mention from the Best First Feature award jury.

== Awards ==
Harker won the Vancouver Film Critics Circle award for Best Supporting Actress in a Canadian Film, and was nominated for Best Supporting Actress at the 2004 Leo Awards.
