= Sisters & Brothers =

2011 film

- Theatrical release poster
- Directed by: Carl Bessai
- Written by: Carl Bessai
- Produced by: Emily Alden; James Brown; Carl Bessai
- Starring: Cory Monteith; Amanda Crew; Dustin Milligan; Camille Sullivan
- Cinematography: Carl Bessai
- Edited by: Sabrina Pitre
- Music by: Dan Moxon
- Production companies: Raven West Films; Pacific Northwest Pictures; Myriad Pictures
- Distributed by: Pacific Northwest Pictures
- Release dates: September 8, 2011 (TIFF); March 23, 2012 (Canada)
- Running time: 90 minutes
- Country: Canada
- Language: English

Sisters & Brothers is a 2011 Canadian comedy-drama film written and directed by Carl Bessai. The film explores the relationships of four sets of siblings, who have not had contact for some time (in one case, never). It is the final film in Bessai's Family X trilogy exploring family relations, following Mothers & Daughters (2008) and Fathers & Sons (2010).

The film had its world premiere at the Toronto International Film Festival on September 8, 2011, followed by a limited release in Canada on March 23, 2012.

== Cast ==
- Cory Monteith as Justin
- Dustin Milligan as Rory, Justin's brother
- Amanda Crew as Nikki, an actress
- Benjamin Ratner as Jerry, a man with schizophrenia
- Gabrielle Miller as Louise, Jerry's sister
- Jay Brazeau as Ringo, Jerry's "lawyer"
- Camille Sullivan as Maggie, Nikki's half-sister
- Tom Scholte as Henry, the 'producer', meets Nikki
- Kacey Rohl as Sarah, no siblings until the Sita surprise
- Gabrielle Rose as Marion, Sarah and Sita's mother
- Leena Manro as Sita, Sarah's (surprise) half-sister

== Production ==
The main performances are improvised, resulting in the eleven main performers, along with writer and director Bessai, being credited under the heading "A Collective Creation By". Filming took place in Vancouver and Los Angeles.
