= Kingsway (film) =

2018 comedy-drama film

- Film poster
- Directed by: Bruce Sweeney
- Written by: Bruce Sweeney
- Produced by: Tracy Major; Bruce Sweeney; Jeff Gladstone; Rafi Spivak; David Pelletier
- Starring: Gabrielle Rose; Jeff Gladstone; Camille Sullivan
- Cinematography: David Pelletier
- Edited by: Rafi Spivak
- Music by: James Jandrisch
- Production company: Carkner Films
- Release date: September 10, 2018 (TIFF)
- Running time: 88 minutes
- Country: Canada
- Language: English

Kingsway is a 2018 Canadian comedy-drama film, written, produced, and directed by Bruce Sweeney. The film stars Gabrielle Rose as Marion Horvat, a woman whose adult son Matt (Jeff Gladstone) has recently attempted suicide after breaking up with his wife. The film also stars Camille Sullivan as Marion's daughter and Matt's sister Jess, Agam Darshi as Jess's girlfriend Megan, and Colleen Rennison as Matt's ex-wife Lori.

The film premiered at the 2018 Toronto International Film Festival.

Rose received a Vancouver Film Critics Circle Award nomination for Best Supporting Actress in a Canadian Film at the Vancouver Film Critics Circle Awards 2018.
