= Live Bait (film) =

- Directed by: Bruce Sweeney
- Written by: Bruce Sweeney
- Produced by: Bruce Sweeney
- Starring: Tom Scholte; Kevin McNulty; Babz Chula; David Lovgren
- Cinematography: David Pelletier
- Edited by: Ross Weber
- Music by: Don MacDonald
- Production company: Cypher Productions
- Release date: September 9, 1995 (TIFF)
- Running time: 84 minutes
- Country: Canada
- Language: English

Live Bait is a Canadian comedy-drama film, released in 1995. The directorial debut of Bruce Sweeney, the film won the award for Best Canadian Feature Film at the 1995 Toronto International Film Festival.

The film stars Tom Scholte as Trevor McIntosh, a 23-year-old man attempting to lose his virginity during the summer after his college graduation, while the relationship of his parents (Babz Chula and Kevin McNulty) is simultaneously faltering.

The film was written as Sweeney's graduate thesis for his MFA in Film Studies at the University of British Columbia.
