= Excited (film) =

- Poster
- Directed by: Bruce Sweeney
- Written by: Bruce Sweeney
- Produced by: Catherine Middleton; Bruce Sweeney
- Starring: Cam Cronin; Laara Sadiq; Gabrielle Rose; Paul Skrudland; Agam Darshi
- Cinematography: David Pelletier
- Edited by: Rafi Spivak
- Music by: James Jandrisch
- Distributed by: Union Pictures
- Release dates: September 17, 2009 (TIFF); May 29, 2010 (Canada)
- Running time: 85 minutes
- Country: Canada
- Language: English

Excited is a 2009 Canadian romantic comedy-drama film written and directed by Vancouver-based director Bruce Sweeney and produced by Catherine Middleton and Bruce Sweeney. It has screened at the Toronto International Film Festival, the Vancouver International Film Festival, the Palm Springs International Film Festival and the Seattle International Film Festival. It was given a theatrical release with Union Pictures.

The film collected four Leo Awards including Best Feature length Drama and Best Direction of a feature-length drama.

== Plot ==
Although a successful business-owner of a golf-course, Kevin hasn't been on a date in eight years much to the dismay of his mother (Gabrielle Rose), who is desperate for grandchildren. Unbeknownst to her, Kevin suffers from PE - premature ejaculation, which is the reason for his divorce and lack of love. When he is set up with Hayaam, the over-educated shoe sales clerk, it seems like a match made in heaven, until Kevin's sexual problem stands in the way. With medical help, and patience from Hayaam, it looks like things could work out until Kevin discovers Hayaam can't bear children. Finally, Kevin must decide if his own needs are more important than his family's if he's going to truly find love.

== Cast ==
- Cam Cronin as Kevin
- Laara Sadiq as Hayaam
- Paul Skrudland as Randy
- Gabrielle Rose as Claire
- Agam Darshi as Safira
- Kevin McNulty as Bob
- Nicholas Lea as Skidder
- Priscilla Costa as Stacy
- Kathleen Duborg as Leila
- Vincent Gale as Jeff

== Awards ==
- Leo Awards - Best Direction in a Feature Length Drama
- Leo Awards - Best Feature Length Drama
- Leo Awards - Best Supporting Performance by a Female in a Feature Length Drama (Gabrielle Rose)
- Leo Awards - Best Lead Performance by a Female in a Feature Length Drama (Laara Sadiq)
