= Ross Weber =

Ross Weber is a Canadian film director and editor from Vancouver, British Columbia.

Weber's first major film credit was as the writer of the screenplay for The Michelle Apartments. He subsequently worked for a number of years as an editor, receiving a Genie Award nomination for Best Editing at the 22nd Genie Awards in 2002, for his work on Last Wedding. His other editing credits included the films Live Bait, Dirty, Daydrift, Various Positions and Moving Malcolm.

His first film as a director, No More Monkeys Jumpin' on the Bed, was released in 2000. He won the award for Best Emerging Western Canadian Director at the 2000 Vancouver International Film Festival. He followed up in 2006 with Mount Pleasant, for which he won the Leo Award for Best Direction in a Feature Length Drama in 2007.
