= Bruce Sweeney =

Canadian film director (born 1962)

- Born: Bruce Sweeney ca. 1962; Sarnia, Ontario, Canada
- Occupation: Film director
- Years active: 1995–present

Bruce Sweeney (born 1962 in Sarnia, Ontario) is a Canadian film director. He has spent his career based primarily in Vancouver, British Columbia.

== Career ==
Sweeney's debut film, Live Bait, won the award for Best Canadian Feature Film at the 1995 Toronto International Film Festival.

He won the 2002 Canadian Comedy Award for Pretty Funny Film Direction for the film Last Wedding. The film also won the award for Best Canadian Film from the Toronto Film Critics Association.

On June 5, 2010, Sweeney's film Excited won four Leo Awards for Best Feature Length Drama, Best Direction in a Feature Length Drama, Best Supporting Performance by a Female in a Feature Length Drama (Gabrielle Rose) and Best Lead Performance by a Female in a Feature Length Drama (Laara Sadiq). In October 2013 The Dick Knost Show won Best BC Film at the Vancouver International Film Festival.

== Filmography ==
- Live Bait (1995)
- Dirty (1998)
- Last Wedding (2001)
- American Venus (2007)
- Excited (2009)
- Crimes of Mike Recket (2012)
- The Dick Knost Show (2013)
- Kingsway (2018)
- She Talks to Strangers (2023)
