= American Venus =

- Theatrical release poster
- Directed by: Bruce Sweeney
- Written by: Bruce Sweeney
- Produced by: Stephen Hegyes
- Starring: Rebecca De Mornay; Jane McGregor; Matt Craven
- Cinematography: David Pelletier
- Edited by: Julian Clarke
- Music by: James Jandrisch
- Production company: Brightlight Pictures
- Distributed by: TVA Films
- Release date: September 8, 2007 (Toronto International Film Festival)
- Running time: 81 minutes
- Country: Canada
- Language: English

American Venus is a 2007 Canadian drama film directed by Bruce Sweeney and starring Rebecca De Mornay, Jane McGregor, and Matt Craven.

== Plot ==
Jenna is a teenaged competitive skater who has been coached by her overprotective, high-strung, gun-obsessed mother Celia. When she quits competing and decides to go to college in Vancouver, her mother becomes very upset and tries to prevent her from leaving home; eventually locking her in a hot sauna until Jenna agrees to stay. Her father gives Jenna money behind her mother's back in order to help Jenna leave home. Her mother goes to Canada to force her to come back home. Once there, the mother becomes increasing unstable as she first tries to bring a handgun into Canada, tries to procure one from a drug dealer, and finally has sex with a policeman who gets a gun for her. After Jenna brings her father to Vancouver to fly her mother home that day, the mother instead insists, against Jenna's protests, that she will drive herself back. The father leaves and that night the mother breaks into Jenna's apartment and forces her to pack and drive home by gun point. Before they get out of Canada, the mother fires a warning shot at an overly-persistent squeegee man who, after cleaning the car windshield, is looking for some form of payment. Shaking, she orders Jenna to stop driving and runs into a tunnel in a park where she pulls the gun out and begs Jenna to shoot her. A struggle ensues over the gun with the mother getting a grazed in the head, knocking her off of her feet. As Jenna cradles her, Celia acknowledges to Jenna that she must let her go. The movie ends with the mother returning to the United States the next morning with a bandage on her head.

== Cast ==
- Rebecca De Mornay as Celia
- Jane McGregor as Jenna
- Matt Craven as Bob
- Anna Amoroso as Michelle
- Ryan McDonald as Ty
- Nicholas Lea as Dougie
- Paul Skrudland as Matty
- Agam Darshi as Ki
- Vanessa Tomasino as Tracy
- Eric Hempsall as Cam
- Kevin McNulty as Dick
- Babz Chula as Peggy

== Production ==
American Venus was directed by Bruce Sweeney, a Canadian. Filmed in Vancouver, British Columbia, Canada, it was originally released on September 8, 2007 at the Toronto International Film Festival.

== Reception ==
Dennis Harvey of Variety wrote "Writer-helmer Bruce Sweeney can't decide if the lead figure is a comic caricature or pathetic mental case; his resolution is so desultory it feels like he ceased caring".

Geoff Pevere of Toronto Star criticized film for a "Never settling on a consistent tone or establishing a convincing context" when it comes to for "its central character", adding that "the movie ultimately seems to grow bored even with itself".
