= Carl Bessai =

Canadian film director and screenwriter

- Born: 1966 (age 59–60); Edmonton, Alberta, Canada
- Occupations: Film director Screenwriter; Cinematographer; Film producer
- Years active: 1998–present

Carl Bessai (born 1966 in Edmonton, Alberta) is a Canadian film director and screenwriter. Bessai studied at OCAD University and at York University in Toronto graduating with a Master of Fine Arts Degree. He got his start directing documentary films before moving to Vancouver and directing his debut feature film Johnny in 1999.

Bessai was nominated for the Genie Award for Best Director at the 29th Genie Awards for his 2007 film Normal, which was also a nominee for Best Motion Picture.

He is a member of the Directors Guild of Canada, the Writers Guild of Canada, and the Canadian Film and Television Producers Association.

== Selected filmography ==
- Johnny (1999)
- Lola (2001)
- Emile (2003)
- Severed: Forest of the Dead (2005)
- Unnatural & Accidental (2006)
- Normal (2007)
- Mothers & Daughters (2008)
- Cole (2009)
- Repeaters (2010)
- Fathers & Sons (2010)
- Sisters & Brothers (2011)
- No Clue (2013)
- Rehearsal (2015)
- The Lears (2017)
- In Her City (2020)
- Evelyne (2021)
