= Mothers & Daughters (2008 film) =

Mothers and Daughters
- Directed by: Carl Bessai
- Written by: Carl Bessai
- Produced by: Carl Bessai; Rod Ruel
- Starring: Babz Chula; Gabrielle Rose; Tantoo Cardinal; Camille Sullivan; Tiffany Lyndall-Knight; Tinsel Korey
- Cinematography: Carl Bessai
- Edited by: Mark Shearer
- Music by: Lullaby Baxter; Bertram Havisham
- Production company: Ravenwest Films
- Distributed by: Kinosmith
- Release date: September 8, 2008 (TIFF)
- Running time: 85 minutes
- Country: Canada
- Language: English

Mothers and Daughters is a 2008 Canadian comedy-drama film, directed by Carl Bessai.

The film, an exploration of mother-daughter relationships, centres on a group of women in Vancouver. Micki (Babz Chula) is a romance novelist who has tried to relate to her daughter Rebecca (Camille Sullivan) as a friend and peer rather than as a mother; Brenda (Gabrielle Rose) is a woman whose relationship with her daughter Kate (Tiffany Lyndall-Knight) is tested when her husband leaves her for another woman; Celine (Tantoo Cardinal) is a single house painter with no children, who has the opportunity to indulge her maternal instincts when her young client Cynthia (Tinsel Korey) needs assistance with her pregnancy. The characters and dialogue were developed by the actresses through an improvisational process.

At the 2008 Vancouver International Film Festival, the film won the audience award for Most Popular Canadian Film. Rose received a Genie Award nomination for Best Actress at the 30th Genie Awards.

Bessai went on to make two more films, Fathers & Sons (2010) and Sisters & Brothers (2011), that used a similar process and structure to explore family dynamics.

== Cast ==
- Babz Chula as Micki
- Gabrielle Rose as Brenda
- Tantoo Cardinal as Celine
- Camille Sullivan as Rebecca
- Tiffany Lyndall-Knight as Kate
- Tinsel Korey as Cynthia
- Sarah Lind as Store Clerk
