= Measures for a Funeral =

- Film poster
- Directed by: Sofia Bohdanowicz
- Screenplay by: Sofia Bohdanowicz; Deragh Campbell
- Produced by: Andreas Mendtritzki; Aonan Yang; Sofia Bohdanowicz; Priscilla Galvez
- Starring: Deragh Campbell
- Cinematography: Nikolay Michaylov
- Edited by: Pablo Alvarez-Mesa; Sofia Bohdanowicz
- Music by: Olivier Alary
- Production companies: Greenground Productions; Maison du Bonheur Films
- Distributed by: Vortex Media
- Release date: September 7, 2024 (TIFF)
- Running time: 142 minutes
- Country: Canada
- Language: English

Measures for a Funeral is a 2024 Canadian drama film directed by Sofia Bohdanowicz. An expansion of her 2018 short film Veslemøy's Song, the film stars Deragh Campbell as Audrey Benac, a graduate student researching the life and career of classical violinist Kathleen Parlow.

The cast also includes María Dueñas, Melanie Scheiner, Mary Margaret O'Hara, Yannick Nézet-Séguin, Maxim Gaudette, Eve Duranceau, Eileen Davies, Rosa Johan-Uddoh, Grace Glowicki, Kieran Adams, Anni Spadafora, Fan Wu, Heidi Galvez, Julia Beyer, Darrah Teitel and Aaron Danby in supporting roles.

In addition to Veslemøy's Song, Campbell previously played Audrey Benac in Bohdanowicz's films Never Eat Alone (2016), MS Slavic 7 (2019), Point and Line to Plane (2020) and A Woman Escapes (2022).

== Release ==
Paris-based company Totem Films acquired world sales rights, excluding Canada, to the film in advance of its world premiere in the Toronto International Film Festival’s Centrepiece program. The film premiered in the Centrepiece program at the 2024 Toronto International Film Festival.

== Critical response ==
For Collider, Taylor Gates wrote: "On a craft level, Measures for a Funeral is remarkable. The entire film is a concert of sorts, and each shot is like looking at a breathtaking painting."

At Drink In The Movies, Michael Clawson wrote: "Tonally, the movie can seem at odds with itself. On one hand, this is a highly cerebral film. [...] There’s a separate impulse towards eerier, more ominous terrain, much of which is grounded in Audrey’s grief. The integration of these two instincts can be awkward. [...] What kept me leaning in was more visual in nature: Bohdanowicz’s precise eye for cloudy European locales, lonely research libraries, and dusky music halls."
