= Point and Line to Plane =

- Directed by: Sofia Bohdanowicz
- Written by: Sofia Bohdanowicz
- Produced by: Sofia Bohdanowicz; Calvin Thomas
- Starring: Deragh Campbell
- Cinematography: Sofia Bohdanowicz
- Edited by: Sofia Bohdanowicz
- Music by: Stefana Fratila
- Release date: July 2020 (Marseille)
- Running time: 17 minutes
- Country: Canada
- Language: English

Point and Line to Plane is a 2020 Canadian dramatic short film directed by Sofia Bohdanowicz and starring Deragh Campbell. The film continues to follow the character Audrey Benac (originated in 2016's Never Eat Alone).

The film premiered at the Marseille International Film Festival in July 2020 and subsequently screened at the 2020 Toronto International Film Festival, the 2020 New York Film Festival, the Festival de nouveau cinéma in Montreal, and the Vienna International Film Festival, among others.

== Plot ==
Devastated after the death of a friend, a young woman (Deragh Campbell) attempts to extract meaning from this intense loss as she discovers signs in her daily life and through encounters with the art of Hilma af Klint and Wassily Kandinsky.

Borrowing its title from Kandinsky’s 1926 book, Point and Line to Plane portrays the phenomenon of magical thinking endured during an individual’s journey to process, heal and document a period of mourning. As the woman peers deeper into the invisible, the resurrecting potential of perception helps illuminate the power of how we choose to look and, moreover, how we see.

== Cast ==
- Deragh Campbell as Audrey Benac

== Production ==
Campbell portrays Audrey Benac for a fourth time, having previously played her for Bohdanowicz in the films Never Eat Alone (2016), Veslemøy's Song (2018), and MS Slavic 7 (2019).
