= Deragh Campbell =

Canadian actress

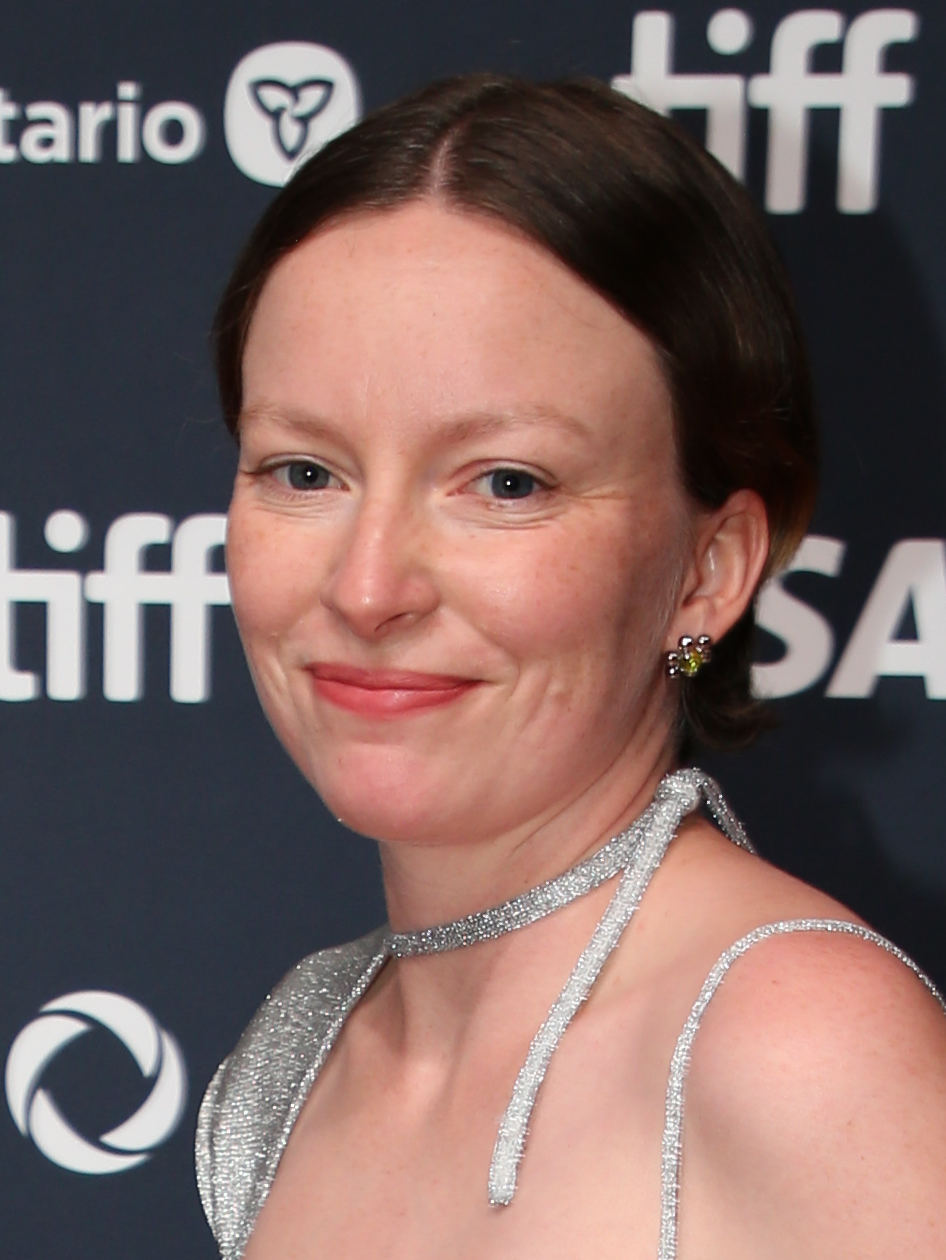
- Campbell at the 2024 Toronto International Film Festival
- Born: 4 May 1989 (age 37); Toronto, Ontario, Canada
- Occupations: Actress, filmmaker
- Years active: 2013–present
- Known for: Collaborations with Sofia Bohdanowicz and Kazik Radwanski
- Parent(s): Benedict Campbell; Jackie Maxwell

Deragh Campbell (born May 4, 1989) is a Canadian actress and filmmaker.

Campbell is known for her performances and filmmaking work in the independent Canadian cinema. Her collaborations with filmmaker Sofia Bohdanowicz—including Veslemøy's Song (2018), MS Slavic 7 (2019), Point and Line to Plane (2020), and Measures for a Funeral (2024)—have screened at film festivals internationally. Campbell has also starred in three of Kazik Radwanski's feature films; she played a small role in How Heavy This Hammer (2015), the lead role in Anne at 13,000 Ft. (2019), and she starred opposite Matt Johnson in Matt and Mara (2024).

Campbell received the Jay Scott Prize from the Toronto Film Critics Association and Best Actress in a Canadian Film from the Vancouver Film Critics Circle.

== Early life ==
Born on May 4, 1989 in Toronto and raised in Niagara-on-the-Lake, Campbell is the daughter of actor Benedict Campbell and artistic director of the Shaw Festival Jackie Maxwell.

== Career ==
Campbell made her film debut in Matthew Porterfield's 2013 independent feature film I Used to Be Darker. She was named as one of the Toronto International Film Festival's "Rising Stars" in 2015, alongside Stephan James, Aliocha Schneider, and Karelle Tremblay. Around this time, she also appeared in the feature films How Heavy This Hammer (2015), and Fail to Appear (2017).

Campbell's collaborations with filmmaker Sofia Bohdanowicz have screened at festivals around the world. Since 2018, she has portrayed the character of Audrey Benac in six of Bohdanowicz's films: Never Eat Alone (2016), Veslemøy's Song (2018), MS Slavic 7 (2019), Point and Line to Plane (2020), A Woman Escapes (2022), and Measures for a Funeral (2024). Campbell was a credited co-director of MS Slavic 7 as well.

In 2019, Campbell starred in Kazik Radwanski's third feature film, Anne at 13,000 Ft., which premiered in the Platform Prize competition and received an honourable mention from the jury at the 2019 Toronto International Film Festival.

Campbell starred opposite Michaela Kurimsky in Hannah Cheesman's short film, Succor; the short film was an official selection for the 2020 Toronto International Film Festival.

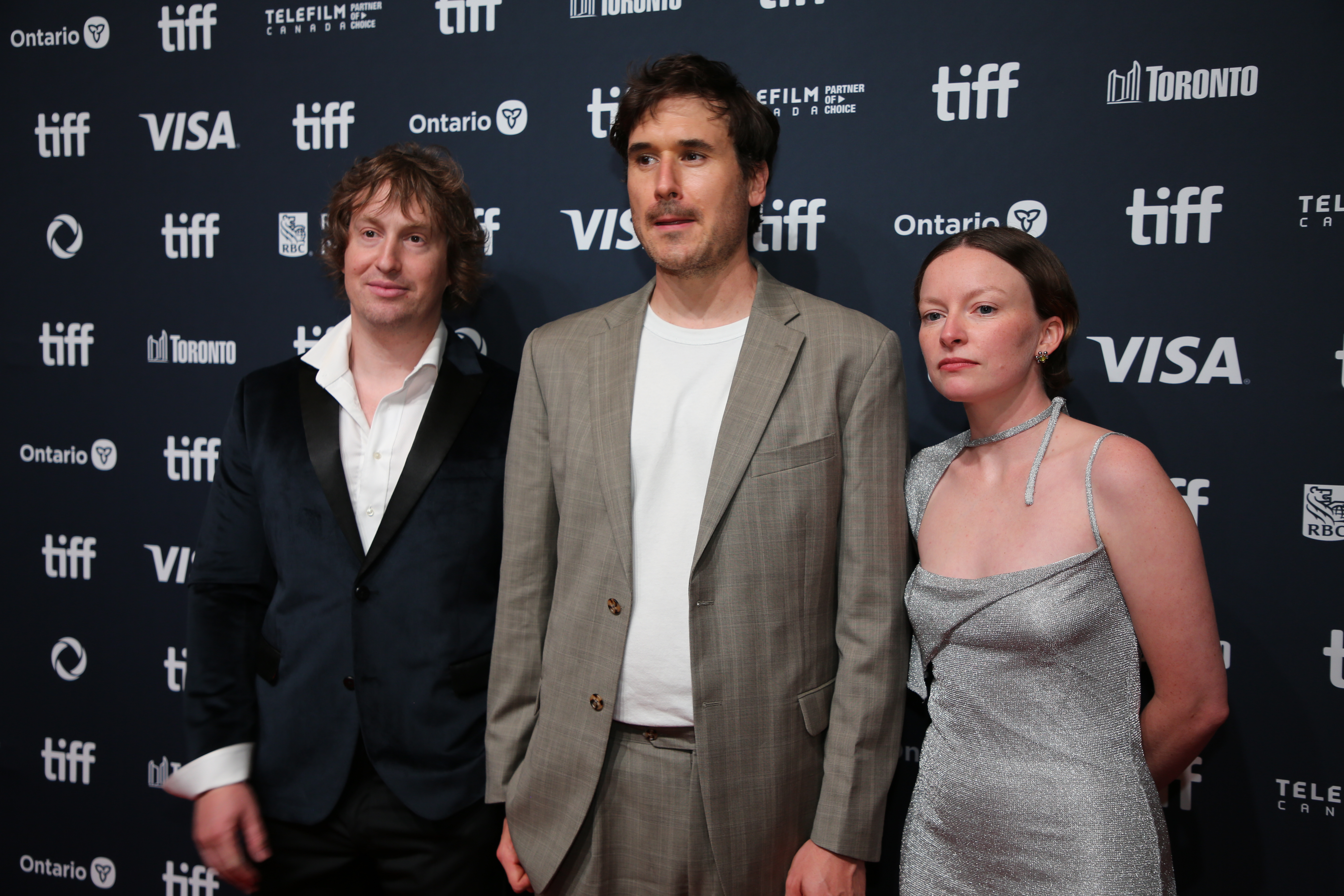
Campbell with her Matt and Mara director Kazik Radwinski and her co-star Matt Johnson at the 2024 Toronto International Film Festival

In 2023, Campbell appeared in Houston Bone's directorial debut, I Don't Know Who You Are, which premiered in the Discovery program at the Toronto International Film Festival. That year, she also starred in Lucy Kerr's directorial debut, Family Portrait, premiering at the 76th Locarno Film Festival.

In 2024, Campbell starred in two feature films; she starred opposite Matt Johnson in Radwanski's fourth feature film, Matt and Mara, and she also reprised the role of Audrey Benac under Bohdanowicz's direction in Measures for a Funeral. In the latter, Benac is a graduate student researching the life and career of classical violinist Kathleen Parlow. The film premiered in the Centrepiece program at the 2024 Toronto International Film Festival.

In 2025, she starred in a film called Two Cuckolds Go Swimming, which premiered at the 2025 edition of Montreal Critics' Week.

== Pledge ==
In September 2025, she signed an open pledge with Film Workers for Palestine pledging not to work with Israeli film institutions "that are implicated in genocide and apartheid against the Palestinian people."

== Filmography ==
Year	Title	Role	Notes
2013	I Used to Be Darker	Taryn	
2014	Person to Person	Julia	
2015	Stinking Heaven	Lucy	
2015	Beach Week	Yeardley	
2015	How Heavy This Hammer	Schoolteacher	
2015	O, Brazen Age	Anna	
2016	The Other Half	Anna	
2016	Never Eat Alone	Audrey Benac	Vancouver Film Critics Circle nominee for Best Actress in a Canadian Film
2016	The Intestine	Patricia	
2016	Let Your Heart Be Light		
2017	Self-Criticism of a Bourgeois Dog	Camille	
2017	Mobile Homes	Actress	
2017	Fail to Appear	Isolde	Vancouver Film Critics Circle nominee for Best Actress in a Canadian Film
2017	All Shook Up	Slain beauty queen	
2018	It's Hard to Be Human	Victoria	
2018	Veslemøy's Song	Audrey Benac	
2019	MS Slavic 7	Audrey Benac	
2019	Please Speak Continuously and Describe Your Experiences as They Come to You	Emily	
2019	Project Ithaca	Sera	
2019	Anne at 13,000 Ft.	Anne	Canadian Screen Award nominee for Best Actress; Vancouver Film Critics Circle nominee for Best Actress in a Canadian Film
2019	Pick	Teacher	
2019	Chubby	Heather	
2019	Foreign Powers		
2020	Point and Line to Plane	Audrey Benac	
2020	Succor	Abigail	
2022	You Can Live Forever	Amanda	
2022	A Woman Escapes	Audrey Benac	
2022	So Much Tenderness	Nancy	
2023	I Don't Know Who You Are	Agnes	
2023	Family Portrait	Katy	
2023	An Evening Song (for three voices)	Martha	
2024	Matt and Mara	Mara	
2024	Measures for a Funeral	Audrey Benac	
2025	Two Cuckolds Go Swimming	Molly	
