= Vancouver Film Critics Circle Awards 2019 =

Annual Canadian film awards ceremony

The nominations for the 20th Vancouver Film Critics Circle Awards, honoring the best in filmmaking in 2019, were announced on December 16, 2019. Winners in the international categories were announced on December 16, and winners in the Canadian film categories were announced on January 6, 2020.

== Winners and nominees ==
=== International ===
| Category | Winners and nominees | Films | Ref. |
|---|---|---|---|
| Best Film | Bong Joon-ho | Parasite | |
| Best Film | Martin Scorsese | The Irishman | |
| Best Film | Noah Baumbach | Marriage Story | |
| Best Actor | Adam Driver | Marriage Story | |
| Best Actor | Antonio Banderas | Pain and Glory | |
| Best Actor | Joaquin Phoenix | Joker | |
| Best Actress | Scarlett Johansson | Marriage Story | |
| Best Actress | Lupita Nyong'o | Us | |
| Best Actress | Saoirse Ronan | Little Women | |
| Best Supporting Actor | Brad Pitt | Once Upon a Time in Hollywood | |
| Best Supporting Actor | Tom Hanks | A Beautiful Day in the Neighborhood | |
| Best Supporting Actor | Joe Pesci | The Irishman | |
| Best Supporting Actress | Laura Dern | Marriage Story | |
| Best Supporting Actress | Jennifer Lopez | Hustlers | |
| Best Supporting Actress | Florence Pugh | Little Women | |
| Best Director | Bong Joon-ho | Parasite | |
| Best Director | Sam Mendes | 1917 | |
| Best Director | Martin Scorsese | The Irishman | |
| Best Screenplay | Noah Baumbach | Marriage Story | |
| Best Screenplay | Bong Joon-ho and Han Jin-won | Parasite | |
| Best Screenplay | Quentin Tarantino | Once Upon a Time in Hollywood | |
| Best Documentary | Tamara Kotevska and Ljubomir Stefanov | Honeyland | |
| Best Documentary | Todd Douglas Miller | Apollo 11 | |
| Best Documentary | Waad Al-Khateab and Edward Watts | For Sama | |
| Best Foreign Language Film | Bong Joon-ho | Parasite | |
| Best Foreign Language Film | Lulu Wang | The Farewell | |
| Best Foreign Language Film | Pedro Almodóvar | Pain and Glory | |

=== Canadian ===
| Category | Winners and nominees | Films | Ref. |
|---|---|---|---|
| Best Film | Kathleen Hepburn and Elle-Máijá Tailfeathers | The Body Remembers When the World Broke Open | |
| Best Film | Kazik Radwanski | Anne at 13,000 Ft. | |
| Best Film | Matthew Rankin | The Twentieth Century | |
| Best Actor | Dan Beirne | The Twentieth Century | |
| Best Actor | Tim Guinee | Ash | |
| Best Actor | David Thewlis | Guest of Honour | |
| Best Actress | Deragh Campbell | Anne at 13,000 Ft. | |
| Best Actress | Violet Nelson | The Body Remembers When the World Broke Open | |
| Best Actress | Kacey Rohl | White Lie | |
| Best Supporting Actor | Matt Johnson | Anne at 13,000 Ft. | |
| Best Supporting Actor | David Cronenberg | Disappearance at Clifton Hill | |
| Best Supporting Actor | Louis Negin | The Twentieth Century | |
| Best Supporting Actress | Amber Anderson | White Lie | |
| Best Supporting Actress | Chelah Horsdal | Ash | |
| Best Supporting Actress | Catherine St-Laurent | The Twentieth Century | |
| Best Director | Kathleen Hepburn and Elle-Máijá Tailfeathers | The Body Remembers When the World Broke Open | |
| Best Director | Kazik Radwanski | Anne at 13,000 Ft. | |
| Best Director | Matthew Rankin | The Twentieth Century | |
| Best Screenplay | Calvin Thomas and Yonah Lewis | White Lie | |
| Best Screenplay | Kazik Radwanski | Anne at 13,000 Ft. | |
| Best Screenplay | Matthew Rankin | The Twentieth Century | |
| Best Documentary | Tasha Hubbard | nîpawistamâsowin: We Will Stand Up | |
| Best Documentary | Lewis Bennett and Aaron Zeghers | Danny | |
| Best Documentary | Baljit Sangra | Because We Are Girls | |
| Best British Columbia Film | Kathleen Hepburn and Elle-Máijá Tailfeathers | The Body Remembers When the World Broke Open | |
| Best British Columbia Film | Harry Cepka | Raf | |
| Best British Columbia Film | Baljit Sangra | Because We Are Girls | |
| One to Watch | Matthew Rankin | The Twentieth Century | |
| One to Watch | Elle-Máijá Tailfeathers | The Body Remembers When the World Broke Open | |
| One to Watch | Heather Young | Murmur | |
