= Two Cuckolds Go Swimming =

2025 Canadian film directed by Winston DeGiobbi

- Directed by: Winston DeGiobbi
- Written by: Winston DeGiobbi
- Produced by: Winston DeGiobbi
- Starring: Deragh Campbell; Stephen Melanson
- Cinematography: Jeff Wheaton
- Edited by: Winston DeGiobbi
- Production company: Easter Green Films
- Release date: January 13, 2025 (Montreal Critics' Week)
- Running time: 82 minutes
- Country: Canada
- Language: English

Two Cuckolds Go Swimming is a Canadian drama film, directed by Winston DeGiobbi and released in 2025. The film stars Deragh Campbell as Molly Chambers, an adult film star who returns home for a visit, only to be forced to reexamine her relationships with family when she finds her embittered ex-boyfriend Sunshine (Stephen Melanson) staying in her childhood bedroom.

DeGiobbi received Telefilm Canada funding for the film in 2020. In the same year he repurposed unused footage from the film to make the short body horror film Like a Horse in Quarantine for the Greetings from Isolation project.

The film premiered at the 2025 edition of Montreal Critics' Week. It later went into limited release, including screenings at the Paradise Theatre in Toronto in November 2025, and at the 2026 Atlantic International Film Festival.
