= How Heavy This Hammer =

2015 film

- Theatrical release poster
- Directed by: Kazik Radwanski
- Written by: Kazik Radwanski
- Produced by: Daniel Montgomery; Kazik Radwanski
- Starring: Erwin Van Cotthem
- Cinematography: Nikolay Michaylov
- Edited by: Ajla Odobasic
- Production company: MDFF
- Release date: 15 September 2015 (TIFF)
- Running time: 75 minutes
- Country: Canada
- Language: English

How Heavy This Hammer is a 2015 Canadian drama film directed by Kazik Radwanski. The film had its world premiere at the 2015 Toronto International Film Festival and its international premiere at the 66th Berlin International Film Festival.

== Plot ==
Erwin is slowly drifting from familial normalcy into complete oblivion. A husband and father of two, he'd rather spend his evenings playing computer games in solitude than with his concerned wife and increasingly abandoned sons. He idles in his office toiling at his computer and playing rugby on the weekends as his marriage and relationships disintegrate.

== Cast ==
- Erwin Van Cotthem as Erwin
- Kate Ashley as Kate
- Seth Kirsh as Seth
- Andrew Latter as Andrew
- Deragh Campbell as School Teacher
- Matt Johnson as Hardware Store Employee

== Reception ==
During its festival run, it received generally favorable reviews from critics.

Adam Cook in a dispatch to Brooklyn Magazine wrote "Radwanski’s sensitive and empathetic approach effectively brings the viewer into this mundanity and helping us understand the silent pressures and tensions of this unremarkable man and his existential woes."

Angelo Muredda for Cinema Scope said "In just two features and several shorts, co-conceived with producing partner Dan Montgomery, Radwanski has proven himself a gentler, Southern Ontarian answer to Dardennes-style social realism, finding dignity and pathos in the repetitive rhythms and small pleasures of working-class lives."

Mubi Notebook editor Daniel Kasman observed "Such a small story, such an average person to spend time with—this is something no television show would attempt, no mid-tier festival film dare gamble their eligibility for an audience award on. Yet here it is: quiet, a bit pensive, a bit mysterious, and never less than thoughtful. The kind of film you love to discover at a festival."

However, not all reviews were positive during its festival run; The Hollywood Reporter deemed it "an aggressively dreary look at a man who shouldn't have had a family".

During its Canadian theatrical run, the film was met with critical acclaim; it was ultimately nominated for Best Canadian Film at the Toronto Film Critics Association Awards 2016, though it did not win.

The National Post named it "a must-see this week when it opens theatrically in Vancouver and Toronto," The Toronto Star praised its "unique combination of empathy and scorn," NOW Magazine said "Radwanski packs a lot of angst into his slim running time," Exclaim! stated it was "one of the very best Canadian films of the year," and The Globe and Mail called it "raw and engrossing."

When the film had a theatrical run in New York in 2016, it was met with mixed reviews: The New York Times wrote that "whatever investigation it’s attempting, the movie is leaden in its pacing — the first 15 minutes feel like an hour — and its constricted shooting style, practically all hand-held almost close-ups, is transparent in its contrivance of realism." Meanwhile, The Village Voice proclaimed that it was, "Striking, clear-eyed, and very, very funny, it's been justly celebrated as one of the best Canadian films in years."

How Heavy This Hammer currently holds a 83% rating on Rotten Tomatoes, based on 12 reviews.
