= Vancouver Film Critics Circle Awards 2000 =

Annual Canadian film awards ceremony

2000 Vancouver Film Critics Circle Awards
- Date: 2001

Highlights
- Best Film: Traffic
- Best Canadian film: Maelström

The 1st Vancouver Film Critics Circle Awards, honoring the best in filmmaking in 2000, were given in 2001.

== Winners and nominees ==
=== International ===
Category	Winners and nominees	Films	Ref.
Best Film	Steven Soderbergh	Traffic	
Best Film	Ang Lee	Crouching Tiger, Hidden Dragon	
Best Film	Kenneth Lonergan	You Can Count on Me	
Best Film	Giuseppe Piccioni	Not of this World (Fuori dal mundo)	
Best Actor	Benicio del Toro	Traffic	
Best Actor	Billy Crudup	Almost Famous and Jesus' Son	
Best Actor	Mark Ruffalo	You Can Count on Me	
Best Actress	Laura Linney	You Can Count on Me	
Best Actress	Ellen Burstyn	Requiem for a Dream	
Best Actress	Michelle Yeoh	Crouching Tiger, Hidden Dragon	
Best Director	Steven Soderbergh	Traffic	
Best Director	Darren Aronofsky	Requiem for a Dream	
Best Director	Ang Lee	Crouching Tiger, Hidden Dragon	

=== Canadian ===
Category	Winners and nominees	Films	Ref.
Best Film	Denis Villeneuve	Maelström	
Best Film	Allan Moyle	New Waterford Girl	
Best Film	Gary Burns	waydowntown	
Best Actor	Brendan Fletcher	Rollercoaster	
Best Actor	Nicholas Campbell	New Waterford Girl	
Best Actor	Fabrizio Filippo	waydowntown	
Best Actress	Marie-Josée Croze	Maelström	
Best Actress	Liane Balaban	New Waterford Girl	
Best Actress	Nancy Sivak	Protection and No More Monkeys Jumpin' on the Bed	
Best Director	Denis Villeneuve	Maelström	
Best Director	Gary Burns	waydowntown	
Best Director	Scott Smith	Rollercoaster	
Best Off-Indie	Bruce Spangler	Protection	
Best Off-Indie	Blaine Thurier	Low Self-Esteem Girl	
Best Off-Indie	Ross Weber	No More Monkeys Jumpin' on the Bed	
