= Vancouver Film Critics Circle Awards 2001 =

Annual Canadian film awards ceremony

2nd VFCC Awards

January 31, 2002

Best Film:
Memento

Best Canadian Film:
Last Wedding

The 2nd Vancouver Film Critics Circle Awards, honoring the best in filmmaking in 2001, were given on 31 January 2002.

== Winners ==
=== International ===
- Best Actor:
  - Steve Buscemi - Ghost World
- Best Actress:
  - Sissy Spacek - In the Bedroom
- Best Director:
  - Baz Luhrmann - Moulin Rouge!
- Best Film:
  - Memento

=== Canadian ===
- Best Actor:
  - Benjamin Ratner - Last Wedding
- Best Actress:
  - Frida Betrani - Last Wedding
- Best Director:
  - Bruce Sweeney - Last Wedding
- Best Film:
  - Last Wedding
- Best "Off-Indie":
  - Obachan's Garden
