= Sofia Bohdanowicz =

Canadian film director

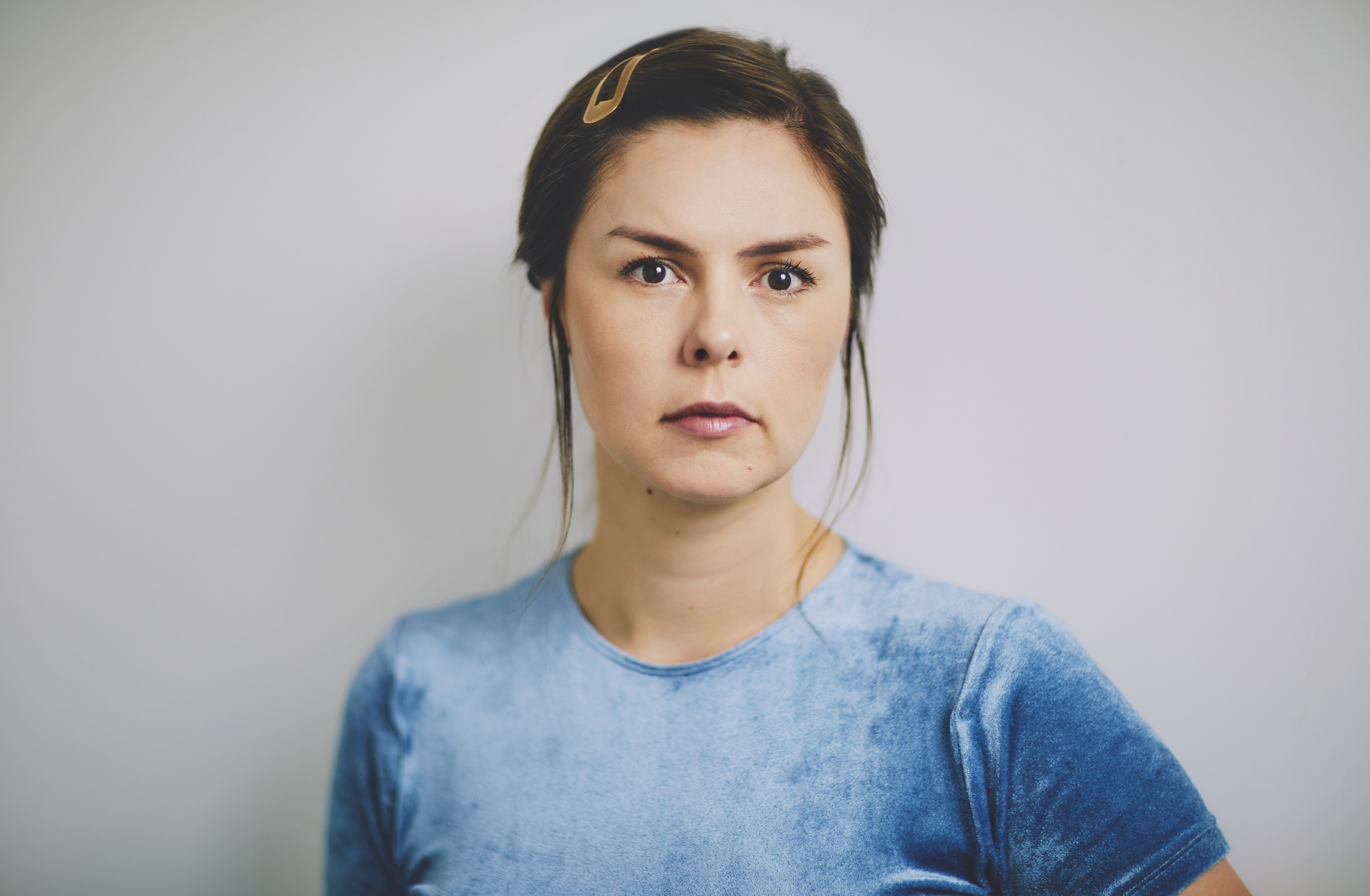
- Bohdanowicz in 2019
- Occupation: Filmmaker
- Years active: 2009–present
- Known for: Maison du Bonheur
- Website: sofiabohdanowicz.com

Sofia Bohdanowicz is a Canadian filmmaker. She is known for her collaborations with Deragh Campbell and made her feature film directorial debut in 2016 with Never Eat Alone. Her second feature film, Maison du Bonheur, was a finalist for the Rogers Best Canadian Film Award at the 2018 Toronto Film Critics Association Awards. That year, she won the Jay Scott Prize from the Toronto Film Critics Association. Her third feature film, MS Slavic 7, which she co-directed with Campbell, had its world premiere at the 69th Berlin International Film Festival in 2019. She subsequently directed the feature films A Woman Escapes (2022) and Measures for a Funeral (2024). She has also directed several short films, such as Veslemøy's Song (2018) and Point and Line to Plane (2020). All of these films, with the exception of Maison du Bonheur, feature Campbell as a character named Audrey Benac.

== Career ==
After directing several short films since 2009, Bohdanowicz made her feature film directorial debut in 2016 with Never Eat Alone. The film follows a lonely grandmother as she tries to reconnect with an ex-boyfriend from her youth. After premiering at the Vancouver International Film Festival, it screened at the Buenos Aires International Festival of Independent Cinema as part of a 2017 retrospective of Bohdanowicz's work.

Her second feature film, Maison du Bonheur, which profiles 77-year-old Juliane Sellam, a French astrologer living in Montmartre, was a finalist for the Rogers Best Canadian Film Award at the Toronto Film Critics Association Awards 2018. The film premiered at the Buenos Aires International Festival of Independent Cinema on April 23, 2017, and had a limited theatrical release in the U.S. and Canada in 2018. The Globe and Mail's Barry Hertz named the film one of his top 10 films of 2018, writing "A supremely thoughtful and careful study of one elderly Parisian woman, Maison du bonheur is as revealing as it is honest and sincere," adding, "This is a film to seek out and cherish.” Glenn Kenny of The New York Times selected the film as a Critics' Pick and called it "a profound delight."

Her collaborations with actress Deragh Campbell have screened at festivals around the world. Since 2016, Campbell has portrayed the character of Audrey Benac in six of Bohdanowicz's feature-length and short films—Never Eat Alone (2016), Veslemøy's Song (2018), MS Slavic 7 (2019), Point and Line to Plane (2020), A Woman Escapes (2022), and Measures for a Funeral (2024); Campbell co-directed MS Slavic 7.

Never Eat Alone premiered in the Future//Present section of the 2016 Vancouver International Film Festival; Veslemøy's Song, a short film, premiered at the 2018 Locarno Film Festival and was named by the Toronto International Film Festival to its annual year-end Canada's Top Ten list; MS Slavic 7 had its world premiere at the 69th Berlin International Film Festival and screened at the annual New Directors/New Films Festival. Point and Line to Plane premiered at the Marseille International Film Festival in July 2020 and subsequently screened at the Toronto International Film Festival, the New York Film Festival, the Festival de nouveau cinéma in Montreal, and the Vienna International Film Festival, among others. Measures for a Funeral, an expansion of Veslemøy's Song, follows Benac once again as she researches the life and career of classical violinist Kathleen Parlow. The film premiered in the Centrepiece program at the 2024 Toronto International Film Festival.

In a 2020 interview with film website Seventh Row, Bohdanowicz revealed that despite directing and editing several feature films, she has never written a screenplay. That year, she also directed a short documentary film titled The Hardest Working Cat in Show Biz, which was released online by Filmmaker.

In 2021, she was one of the participants in John Greyson's experimental short documentary film International Dawn Chorus Day.

== Accolades ==
Bohdanowicz has won accolades for her work. In 2016, at the Vancouver International Film Festival, Bohdanowicz won the Emerging Canadian Director award for Never Eat Alone. At the 17th Vancouver Film Critics Circle Awards, she was nominated for Best Director of a Canadian Film and won the award for Best Canadian Documentary. In 2018, she was awarded the Jay Scott Prize by the Toronto Film Critics Association.

== Filmography ==
Year	Film	Type	Director	Writer	Producer	Cinematographer	Editor	Notes
2009	Falling with Force	Short film	Yes	Yes	No	Yes	Yes	
2012	Dundas Street	Short film	Yes	No	Yes	No	Yes	Co-directed with Joanna Durkalec
2013	An Evening (Wieczór)	Short film	Yes	No	No	Yes	Yes	
2013	A Prayer (Modlitwa)	Short film	Yes	No	No	No	Yes	
2014	Another Prayer (Dalsza Modlitwa)	Short film	Yes	Yes	No	Yes	Yes	
2016	A Drownful Brilliance of Wings	Short film	Yes	No	Yes	No	Yes	
2016	Never Eat Alone	Feature film	Yes	Yes	No	No	No	Feature directorial debut
2017	Maison du Bonheur	Feature film	Yes	No	Yes	Yes	Yes	Documentary
2018	Veslemøy's Song	Short film	Yes	No	Yes	No	No	
2018	The Soft Space	Short film	Yes	No	No	No	No	Co-directed with Melanie Scheiner
2019	MS Slavic 7	Feature film	Yes	Yes	Yes	Yes	Yes	Co-directed with Deragh Campbell
2020	Point and Line to Plane	Short film	Yes	Yes	No	Yes	Yes	
2020	The Hardest Working Cat in Show Biz	Short film	Yes	Yes	Yes	No	Yes	Documentary
2022	A Woman Escapes	Feature film	Yes	Yes	Yes	Yes	Yes	Co-wrote, co-filmed, co-edited with Blake Williams and Burak Çevik
2024	Measures for a Funeral	Feature film	Yes	Yes	Yes	No	Yes	
