= The Body Remembers When the World Broke Open =

2019 film

- Film poster
- Directed by: Elle-Máijá Tailfeathers; Kathleen Hepburn
- Written by: Kathleen Hepburn; Elle-Máijá Tailfeathers
- Produced by: Tyler Hagan; Lori Lozinski; Alan R. Milligan
- Starring: Elle-Máijá Tailfeathers; Violet Nelson
- Cinematography: Norm Li
- Edited by: Christian Siebenherz
- Production companies: Experimental Forest Films; Violator Films
- Distributed by: levelFILM
- Release date: February 9, 2019 (Berlin)
- Running time: 105 minutes
- Country: Canada
- Language: English

The Body Remembers When the World Broke Open (Kwakʼwala: Malkʼwalaʼmida uḵwineʼ leʼołeʼ yax̱idixa̱nʼs ʼnalax̱, Northern Sami: Rumaš muitá go máilbmi rahtasii, Blackfoot: Koistominno saakaisksinima ksaahkomm otsitsikowohpihpi) is a 2019 Canadian drama film written and directed by Elle-Máijá Tailfeathers and Kathleen Hepburn.

The film centres on a chance interaction between two Indigenous women of contrasting lived experience and socio-economic position, Áila (Elle-Máijá Tailfeathers) and Rosie (Violet Nelson), as they navigate the effects of intimate partner violence. The majority of the film appears as a single, continuous long take.

The film premiered at the 2019 Berlin Film Festival in the Generation program, and had its Canadian premiere at the 2019 Toronto International Film Festival. It was nominated for six Canadian Screen Awards, including Best Motion Picture, and won three, including Best Director. In 2020 the film won the Toronto Film Critics Association's Rogers Best Canadian Film Award, Canada's most prestigious film award.

== Plot ==
The film opens with a series of vignettes introducing Rosie, a young Kwakwaka’wakw woman, and Áila (Blackfoot and Sámi). Rosie is pregnant and living with her violent boyfriend and his mother. Áila visits a doctor to have an IUD inserted. After her appointment Áila encounters Rosie, battered and barefoot in the rain, having just fled her boyfriend, who is screaming at her down the street. Áila, unsure of what to do, offers Rosie shelter in her nearby apartment.

Once inside, Rosie is reserved and hesitant to hand over her clothes to dry. While changing in the bathroom, she steals a bottle of Áila's anxiety medication, and later her wallet. Rosie slowly opens up, revealing that she was recently phased out of foster care, but remains adamant they not call the police. Áila insists they should at least find a women's shelter for Rosie to spend the night. She eventually agrees to consider going to a safe house.

On the way, Rosie becomes good-humoured, telling the cab driver she and Áila are sisters, and that Áila is on her way to enter in rehab for her drinking, much to Áila's bemusement. She tells the story of their father dying, possibly mirroring her own truth. At Rosie's stop, Áila secretly follows her into an apartment complex, and witnesses her exchanging the anxiety medication for cash. Back in the cab, Áila quietly confronts Rosie over the drug exchange, who turns hostile and accuses Áila of looking down on her. As they reach the safe house, Áila refuses to go in with Rosie until she tells the truth. Rosie insists she was only selling, not using, and pays for the cab after Áila realizes her wallet is gone.

The two are greeted by Cat (Charlie Hannah) and Sophie (Barbara Eve Harris). Áila explains what happened, and Rosie details some of her boyfriend's abuse, but restates that she will not go the police, due to him being on bail, and her belief that they will not treat her with respect. She also does not wish to join her grandparents in Port Hardy, for fear of being judged as a young single mother. Sophie and Cat offer Rosie a room at the safe house for as long as she needs, and access to social services. After a moment alone with her unborn child in the bathroom, Rosie tells the others that she wants to return home to her boyfriend, downplaying the abuse she shared earlier, and insisting that he will not be angry if she returns right away. On the way out, Sophie assures the frustrated Áila that it is normal for victims of abuse to need several tries before gaining the courage to leave their abuser, and gives Áila money for the taxi.

Áila and Rosie share a quiet ride back to Rosie's apartment. Rosie asks Áila if she is mad at her. Áila says she is not, and tells Rosie she will be a good mother. Rosie says Áila will too. At the apartment, Áila tearfully watches Rosie walk away before driving off as night falls over East Vancouver.

== Production ==
The film's title comes from an essay by Billy-Ray Belcourt. The story is based on a personal experience of Elle-Máijá Tailfeathers.

Production of the film involved an indigenous youth mentorship program, funded through Telus Storyhive, which placed 11 young First Nations filmmakers within each department as mentees.

=== Real-time transitioning technique ===
The directors initially intended for the film to play as one continuous, real-time shot in order to create a heightened state of immediacy for both the actors and the audience. When cinematographer Norm Li suggested shooting on 16 mm film, they were faced with an 11 minute limit due to the size of 16mm film magazines. To circumvent this, he orchestrated a system dubbed "Real-Time Transitioning" in which, at planned cut points, he would hand off the spent camera to an assistant, and be handed another to continue filming; the two shots would then be stitched together in editing. In total, 12 cut points are hidden for the final film. This also allowed the editor, Christian Siebenherz, to blend different takes together from the five days of shooting.

== Reception ==
=== Critical reception ===
The film was critically acclaimed upon release. On the review aggregator website Rotten Tomatoes, the film holds an approval rating of 97%, based on 36 reviews, with an average rating of 8.3/10. The website's consensus reads, "The Body Remembers When the World Broke Open uses an encounter between two strangers as the catalyst for a thoughtful drama as poetic as its title." On Metacritic, the film has a weighted average score of 87 out of 100, based on 8 critics.

=== Accolades ===
At TIFF, the film received an honourable mention from the Best Canadian Film award jury. It was subsequently screened at the imagineNATIVE Film and Media Arts Festival, where it won the award for Best Dramatic Feature, and at the Vancouver International Film Festival, where it received the Best BC Film Award and the BC Emerging Filmmaker Award.

On December 11, the film was named to TIFF's annual year-end Canada's Top Ten list.

At the 8th annual Canadian Screen Awards, the film was nominated for six awards, including Best Motion Picture, and won three, including Best Director.

In January 2020, the film was named the winner of the Vancouver Film Critics Circle Award for Best Canadian Film, and of the Toronto Film Critics Association's $100,000 Rogers Best Canadian Film Award.

Award	Date of ceremony	Category	Recipient(s)	Result	Ref(s)
Canadian Screen Awards	28 May 2020	Best Motion Picture	Tyler Hagan, Lori Lozinski	Nominated	
Canadian Screen Awards	28 May 2020	Best Director	Elle-Máijá Tailfeathers, Kathleen Hepburn	Won	
Canadian Screen Awards	28 May 2020	Best Original Screenplay	Elle-Máijá Tailfeathers, Kathleen Hepburn	Won	
Canadian Screen Awards	28 May 2020	Best Actress	Violet Nelson	Nominated	
Canadian Screen Awards	28 May 2020	Best Actress	Elle-Máijá Tailfeathers	Nominated	
Canadian Screen Awards	28 May 2020	Best Cinematography	Norm Li	Won	
Festival du nouveau cinéma	7–18 October 2020	Grand Prix		Won	
imagineNATIVE Film and Media Arts Festival	22–27 October 2019	Best Dramatic Feature		Won	
Online Film Critics Society	6 January 2020	Best Non-Theatrical Releases		Won	
Toronto Film Critics Association	8 December 2019	Best Canadian Film	Elle-Máijá Tailfeathers, Kathleen Hepburn	Won	
Vancouver Film Critics Circle	16 December 2019	Best Canadian Film	Elle-Máijá Tailfeathers, Kathleen Hepburn	Won	
Vancouver Film Critics Circle	16 December 2019	Best British Columbia Film	Elle-Máijá Tailfeathers, Kathleen Hepburn	Won	
Vancouver Film Critics Circle	16 December 2019	Best Director of a Canadian Film	Elle-Máijá Tailfeathers, Kathleen Hepburn	Won	
Vancouver Film Critics Circle	16 December 2019	Best Actress in a Canadian Film	Violet Nelson	Nominated	
Vancouver Film Critics Circle	16 December 2019	One to Watch	Elle-Máijá Tailfeathers	Nominated	
Vancouver International Film Festival	24 September–9 October 2019	Best BC Film	Elle-Máijá Tailfeathers, Kathleen Hepburn	Won	
Vancouver International Film Festival	24 September–9 October 2019	BC Emerging Filmmaker	Elle-Máijá Tailfeathers	Won	
