= Winston DeGiobbi =

Canadian film director

Winston DeGiobbi is a Canadian film director from Cape Breton, Nova Scotia. He is most noted for his feature debut Mass for Shut-Ins, which was shortlisted for the Directors Guild of Canada's DGC Discovery Award in 2017, and for the Vancouver Film Critics Circle's One to Watch Award at the Vancouver Film Critics Circle Awards 2017.

He began his filmmaking career with the short film Buggery in 2010, and followed up with the short films Higgy Wants In (2014) and Bright Rubber Cones (2017).

In 2020 he received Telefilm Canada funding for his second film Two Cuckolds Go Swimming. In the same year he repurposed unused footage from the film to make the short body horror film Like a Horse in Quarantine for the Greetings from Isolation project.

Two Cuckolds Go Swimming premiered at the 2025 edition of Montreal Critics' Week.

== Filmography ==
- Buggery - 2010
- Higgy Wants In - 2014
- Mass for Shut-Ins - 2017
- Bright Rubber Cones - 2017
- Like a Horse in Quarantine - 2020
- Two Cuckolds Go Swimming - 2025
