= Anne at 13,000 Ft. =

- Film poster
- Directed by: Kazik Radwanski
- Written by: Kazik Radwanski
- Produced by: Daniel Montgomery; Kazik Radwanski
- Starring: Deragh Campbell; Matt Johnson
- Cinematography: Nikolay Michaylov
- Edited by: Ajla Odobašić
- Production company: Medium Density Fibreboard Films
- Release date: September 9, 2019 (TIFF)
- Running time: 75 minutes
- Country: Canada
- Language: English

Anne at 13,000 Ft. is a 2019 Canadian drama film. Directed and written by Kazik Radwanski, the film stars Deragh Campbell as Anne, a shy, socially awkward daycare worker whose attitude to her life and work is radically transformed after she skydives for the first time. It premiered in the Platform Prize program at the 2019 Toronto International Film Festival, and received an honourable mention from the Platform Prize jury. In December 2019, the film was named to TIFF's annual year-end Canada's Top Ten list. After premiering on the festival circuit in 2019, the film's 2020 theatrical release was postponed until 2021 due to the COVID-19 pandemic.

In 2021, the film won the Toronto Film Critics Association's $100,000 Rogers Best Canadian Film Award. It was also nominated for four Canadian Screen Awards, including Best Motion Picture, and five Vancouver Film Critics Circle Awards (winning two for the performances of Campbell and Johnson).

== Premise ==
The film stars Deragh Campbell as Anne, a shy, socially awkward daycare worker whose attitude to her life and work is radically transformed after she skydives for the first time. Anne goes through the motions of life as a 20-something woman in Toronto, clashes with her co-workers, goes on an awkward Tinder date, and serves as maid of honour at her best friend's wedding. Anne suffers from an unspecified anxiety disorder, which remains undiagnosed throughout the film.

== Cast ==
- Deragh Campbell as Anne
- Lawrene Denkers as Barb
- Matt Johnson as Matt
- Michael Kuthe as Michael

== Release ==
Anne at 13,000 Ft. premiered at the 2019 Toronto International Film Festival, before screening at other international festivals, such as the Berlinale. During its festival run, the film was picked up for American distribution by Cinema Guild.

The film was scheduled to be theatrical released on March 20, 2020, but the planned release was postponed due to the COVID-19 pandemic. Nearly a year later, the film was released virtually on February 19, 2021, through the TIFF Bell Lightbox, and Vancouver's Cinematheque.

== Reception ==
=== Critical reception ===
The film received critical acclaim. On the review aggregator website Rotten Tomatoes, the film holds an approval rating of 89% based on 46 reviews, with an average rating of 7.8/10. The website's critics consensus reads, "Held aloft by Deragh Campbell in the title role, Anne at 13,000 Ft tells the soaring story of a woman who's lost her moorings." On Metacritic, the film has a weighted average score of 80 out of 100, based on 15 critics, indicating "generally favorable reviews".

Jessica Kiang of Variety called the film "a brief, bracing burst of microbudget indie filmmaking at its most powerful." Barry Hertz of The Globe and Mail dubbed it "a startling, bracing achievement worth celebrating." Peter Howell of the Toronto Star praised Campbell's "riveting performance as a woman on the verge of vertigo is a sight to behold." Norm Wilner of Now wrote that "if the Dardenne brothers remade A Woman Under The Influence, it might look a lot like Radwanski’s latest study of a Torontonian in a slow-motion crisis: this time, his protagonist is a young day-care worker whose equilibrium is slipping out of her grasp."

=== Accolades ===
In 2021, the film won the Toronto Film Critics Association's $100,000 Rogers Best Canadian Film Award. It was also nominated for four Canadian Screen Awards, including Best Motion Picture, and five Vancouver Film Critics Circle Awards (winning two for Campbell and Johnson's performances).

Award	Date of ceremony	Category	Recipient(s)	Result	Ref(s)
Canadian Screen Awards	May 28, 2020	Best Motion Picture	Daniel Montgomery, Kazik Radwanski	Nominated	
Canadian Screen Awards	May 28, 2020	Best Director	Kazik Radwanski	Nominated	
Canadian Screen Awards	May 28, 2020	Best Actress	Deragh Campbell	Nominated	
Canadian Screen Awards	May 28, 2020	Best Supporting Actor	Matt Johnson	Nominated	
Toronto Film Critics Association	March 9, 2021	Rogers Best Canadian Film Award	Kazik Radwanski	Won	
Vancouver Film Critics Circle	December 16, 2019	Best Canadian Film		Nominated	
Vancouver Film Critics Circle	December 16, 2019	Best Canadian Director	Kazik Radwanski	Nominated	
Vancouver Film Critics Circle	December 16, 2019	Best Canadian Screenplay	Kazik Radwanski	Nominated	
Vancouver Film Critics Circle	December 16, 2019	Best Actress in a Canadian Film	Deragh Campbell	Won	
Vancouver Film Critics Circle	December 16, 2019	Best Supporting Actor in a Canadian Film	Matt Johnson	Won	
