= Protection (2000 film) =

- Directed by: Bruce Spangler
- Written by: Bruce Spangler
- Produced by: Erik Paulsson
- Starring: Jillian Fargey; Nancy Sivak; William MacDonald
- Cinematography: Brian Johnson
- Edited by: Michael Brockington; Luis Lam
- Music by: Bruce Spangler
- Production companies: Thoughtcrime Productions; Red Storm Productions
- Release date: August 26, 2000 (MWFF)
- Running time: 77 minutes
- Country: Canada
- Language: English

Protection is a Canadian drama film, directed by Bruce Spangler and released in 2000. The film stars Jillian Fargey as Betty, a drug addict from Surrey, British Columbia, whose fitness as a mother is being investigated by child protection officer Jane (Nancy Sivak) following suspicions that her boyfriend Joe (William MacDonald) may have been physically and sexually abusive to her children Cindy (Nicole LaPlaca) and Jimmy (Giacomo Baessato).

Spangler, a former social worker, made the film to dramatize the moral complexities of the situations that social workers often face; notably, Jane, the ostensible "hero" of the story, is also portrayed as a drug user.

The film premiered at the Montreal World Film Festival in 2000.

Fargey received a Genie Award nomination for Best Actress at the 22nd Genie Awards in 2001. Sivak received a Vancouver Film Critics Circle award nomination for Best Actress in a Canadian Film at the Vancouver Film Critics Circle Awards 2000, citing her performances in both Protection and No More Monkeys Jumpin' on the Bed. The film received nine Leo Award nominations, including Best Picture, Best Actor (MacDonald) and two nods for Best Actress (Spivak and Fargey).
