= Emanuel Leplin =

American conductor and painter

Emanuel Leplin (October 3, 1917; San Francisco, California – December 1, 1972; Martinez, California) was a composer, conductor, and painter active mainly in the second half of the 20th century. He was born in San Francisco, and joined the San Francisco Symphony as a violist in 1941, conducting it in two of his own works, in 1941 and 1947. In 1954, he contracted polio, and afterward, was unable to hold a brush or compose using anything below his neck but the first three fingers of his right hand. With these fingers he composed three symphonies, a violin concerto, and many other works for orchestra and chamber groups.

== Violin student ==
Leplin was the only child of Russian Jewish immigrants Dora and James Leplin. He began violin study at the age of eight and began composing at the age of 16. When he was 14, James was committed to the Napa State Hospital, an asylum for those with a serious mental illness. His diagnosis was major depressive disorder. Dora Leplin, a seamstress, raised Leplin, then called "Manny", by herself.

Daniel Koshland Sr., a founder of Levi Strauss & Co., paid for Leplin to have violin lessons with Kathleen Parlow, a Canadian former child prodigy turned virtuoso. Other San Francisco philanthropists who sponsored Leplin included Ruth Haas Lilienthal, an affiliate of Levi Strauss & Co., and Agnes Albert, vice president of the San Francisco Symphony Association. After Parlow, Leplin studied with Naoum Blinder, concertmaster of the Symphony.

== Paris and painting ==
Leplin attended the San Francisco Conservatory of Music and the University of California, Berkeley Department of Music, where he studied with E.G. Strickland and Albert Elkus. He studied composition for two summers with Roger Sessions, in 1936 and 1937. In 1939, he won the George Ladd Prix de Paris competition, earning a two-year fellowship to study in Paris. Rather than study with the popular Nadia Boulanger, he chose Darius Milhaud. Milhaud was one of the Groupe des Six (Milhaud, Arthur Honegger, Francis Poulenc, Germaine Tailleferre, Georges Auric, Louis Durey), who wrote rhythmically and harmonically animated pieces such as the Scaramouche Suite for two pianos, and, while in Brazil, Le bœuf sur le toit (The Ox on the Roof of The Nothing-Doing Bar).

Leplin studied conducting first in the South of France, then in Hancock, Maine, at the schools of Pierre Monteux, then the conductor of the San Francisco Symphony. He studied violin with Romanian composer and violinist George Enescu, and with Yvonne Astruc, whose Paris salon was a venue for chamber concerts.

Leplin spent the years 1943–46 in the United States Army. Upon his return from Paris, Leplin formed his own string quartet, directed a woodwind quintet, and rejoined the Symphony at the request of Monteux as a violist, and began composing works for orchestra, and painting oils of San Francisco, its skyscrapers, museums, and bridges, and the Japanese Tea Garden. He also painted scenes of Monterey Harbor and the Carmel Valley.

== Performances and reviews ==
Viola Luther Hagopian, author of Italian ars nova Music: A Bibliographic Guide to Modern Editions and Related Literature, wrote: "This talented young man directed the San Francisco Symphony Orchestra at the Civic Auditorium, December 16 (1941) in his own composition Prelude and Dance. The music critics give him very high ratings as to his music and conducting. He is possessed of a wonderful personality and the gift of composing, playing and teaching. Emanuel Leplin will some day be rated amongst the world's greatest artists."

Marjory M. Fisher wrote: "Leplin's 'Prelude and Dance' was strongly reminiscent in its scoring and general brilliance of the Rimsky-Korsakoff Introduction and Wedding March from 'The Golden Cockerel,' which had opened the program. The Prelude was the more impressive, but the Dance had much of the glitter and excitement of the Russian's instrumentation plus an obvious bit of jazz influence...As a conductor, the 23-year-old composer displayed unusual competence and skill. Mr. Leplin is without doubt capable of making his name mean something in the musical world."

Alfred Frankenstein, music critic of the San Francisco Chronicle, wrote: "This proved to be a dynamic, high-spirited, saltily orchestrated piece...quite worth the hearing.". Alexander Fried, music critic of the San Francisco Examiner wrote: "(It has) incisive modern energy, intricacy, and directness...Incidentally, Leplin proved to be a keenly talented conductor."

Alfred Frankenstein wrote of the premiere of Leplin's Romantic Fantasy for Woodwinds and Piano: "It seemed the production of a modernist amusing himself with romanticism, and finding some breezy, stimulating, fresh-turned material in the process." Alexander Fried wrote: "The honors in technical ability went to Mr. Leplin's Romantic Fantasy...It was a joy to hear suspensions which were practically non-existent in the preceding works."

Marjory Fisher wrote of Leplin's Suite for Quartet: "It proved a most engaging novelty. Gay little melodies and definite rhythms characterized the six brief movements of the suite. Yet there was one plaintive melody which distinguished the Andante no less than Leplin's command of quartet instrumentation distinguished the whole suite. The work proved one of the most ingratiating of the new scores introduced in several seasons." Alfred Frankenstein wrote: "six short, tuneful, beautifully tailored and cleanly executed movements. This is, to my taste, the most vivid, neatly formed and deftly expressive work of Leplin which has yet been given here."

In 1947, the San Francisco Symphony went on a transcontinental tour, performing 56 concerts in 57 days. Leplin's orchestral piece Comedy was chosen to be a featured work of this tour. Leplin first conducted Comedy in San Francisco, and at the Greek Theatre at UC Berkeley, on May 23. Alexander Fried wrote, "It is a speedy, whimsical, tight-knit score. Its strong points are its adroit, tireless energy, its high-strung impudence and its spicy, tingling mixtures of orchestral sound." Samuel T. Wilson wrote of the April 21 performance in Columbus, Ohio: "Mr. Leplin thinks clearly, concisely, and naturally in modern musical idioms. His instrumental writing is notably lucid and direct...an exceedingly effective essay...indications were that Mr. Leplin has definite gifts as a conductor." Of the performance in Sacramento, Mila Landis wrote: the composer "conducted Comedy with great zeal...(it) proved to be stimulating...it issues a peremptory challenge for interest and attention."

Comedy received this review in Pasadena:

Comedy protested": "During the intermission...a committee of San Marino Club members (self-appointed, I am sure) confronted the manager and vociferously and vehemently expressed their disapproval...(of Comedy) which another audience in San Diego received with marked cordiality. The work must have been powerful, in itself or it could not have awakened so violent a reaction.

Comedy was to be the second part of a four-part work called The Drama. The first part, Prologue, was written in 1960 and premiered by the Fresno Philharmonic, conducted by Paul Vermel. Tragedy and Epilogue were never written.

Also in 1960, the New Haven Symphony Orchestra, under the auspices of the American Symphony Orchestra League, Inc. (now the League of American Orchestras), recorded Comedy. The conductor was Frank Brieff, who wrote as follows for The League 1959–1960 Recording Project for Contemporary Music catalogue:

The Comedy Overture of Emanuel Leplin is a jolly, spirited work, ideal for a curtain-raiser on most symphonic programs and which more likely than not would put the audience in a very gay and receptive mood. The style of writing is brilliant for all choirs of the orchestra. The main theme has a Puckish lilt, not unlike Strauss' Till, and is expertly interwoven and tossed about with ease among the different instruments.

There is a second theme of a more lyrical and wistful character which contrasts well with the first, changing the mood for only a short time—the boisterous, loud main theme bursting in again with joie de vivre and good fun...

Although Leplin is a string player himself, he has a fine feeling for the woods and brass whether writing singly or in combinations for these choirs; nothing is unclear; everything sounds clean and fresh.

The work is of medium difficulty for the performers demanding, nevertheless, good solo players.The strings have some ticklish passages which would need to be worked on but written with complete understanding and knowledge of the capabilities of the instruments.

The rhythmical structure offers no problems, the tunes are catchy and pleasant and the orchestra players themselves would enjoy playing the work—an impression I distinctly received from the orchestra at Asilomar when we recorded it.

On March 20, 1962, the Sacramento Symphony performed Comedy, with conductor Fritz Berens.

Leplin wrote four more orchestral works in the 1940s: Galaxy, for two solo cellos and orchestra (1942), Cosmos for violin and orchestra (1947), Incidental Music for Iphegenia of Sophocles, and Birdland (1948).

Leplin conducted a concert by the American Federation of Musicians in San Francisco on August 26, 1949, featuring his own works along with those of Schubert, Beethoven, and Bartók. Alfred Frankenstein wrote: "Leplin came out quite well, both as a creator and interpreter. His peppery, intense and brilliantly orchestrated set of three dances was especially impressive...(the Beethoven symphony) was an assured, breezy, well-considered interpretation...on the whole intelligently conceived and knowingly executed."

In 1953, Leplin founded the San Jose Junior Symphony, now called the San Jose Youth Symphony and in 1953 and '54 he conducted the first three performances of the San Francisco Chamber Orchestra. On summer Sundays, Leplin played with SFS at Stern Grove.

== Sierra trip ==
In the summer of 1954, Leplin went to the High Sierra with several members of the San Francisco Symphony, including Robert S. Gottlieb.

== Polio ==
In the fall of 1954, Leplin contracted polio during an epidemic in the San Francisco Bay Area. He spent eight months in a negative pressure ventilator (an "iron lung"). While he was in a San Francisco hospital, The California Symphony Orchestra, conducted by Murray Graitzer, as well as members of SFS, performed a benefit concert for him. Darius Milhaud guest-conducted in spite of his well-known arthritis, in two of his own pieces, Mediterranean Overture and Air for Viola and Orchestra, which he dedicated to Leplin. According to one press citation, "All unions, including the musicians, stagehands, drayage, box office, etc. are giving their services gratis for the May 11th event. What Leplin doesn't yet know is that the radio engineers and the telephone company will run a direct line to his bedside at Maimonides, so that he will be among those present."

Leplin had a one-man show featuring sixteen of his paintings at the California Palace of the Legion of Honor Museum, including many he created during his illness by "holding the brush with his teeth". Soon after, Comedy was played on "The Standard Hour", a weekly radio broadcast of symphony concerts. He listened from his bed as he recovered.

== Continued composition and painting ==
Leplin was spared the paralysis of the thumb and first two fingers of his right hand. This enabled him to hold a pencil and return to composition. While wife Anita was teaching elementary school in the Belmont, Leplin spent several hours each day composing, writing on a lapboard that rested on the arms of his wheelchair. In 1960, the San Francisco Symphony performed the first of his new orchestral works, Landscapes and Skyscrapers. It also displayed two of his paintings in the Opera House lobby. The feature article in the section "This World" of the San Francisco Chronicle (May 1, 1960) was titled "The World Premiere of Leplin's Compositions and Canvases," and ran photos of the two paintings.

Alfred Frankenstein wrote: "Serenity, clarity, richness of color, and strength of substances were the keynote in Landscapes and Skyscrapers added great excitement of rhythm, a grand gesture, a sense of the epical and the monumental. Both pieces are by no means easy to play, but Jorda and the orchestra gave them extremely brilliant performances, and they were extremely well received."

Alexander Fried wrote that the pieces were "deeply impressive" and "striking." "There are two opposite balances of mood in the Leplin poems. Landscapes is on the whole a work of quieter reflection, building up to incidental climaxes here and there. Skyscrapers, on the contrary, is vigorous and aggressive, but has its softer interludes. Both works have craftsmanship and musical ideas that build into a large, consistent form...They combine direct expressive impact with an overtone of broader vision." The conductor was Enrique Jorda.

Jorda also conducted Leplin's next piece, Symphony No. One, which was commissioned by Agnes Albert and other friends of the Symphony for its 50th Anniversary season. SFS premiered it on 3, 4, 5 of January 1962. Subtitled "Of the Twentieth Century," it has a title for each movement: Illumination, Consternation, Contemplation and Adaptation. For the premiere, Leplin painted four pictures with a brush clamped in his teeth, which were on display in the Opera House lobby during the concerts.

George Dusheck wrote:

If any in the audience were minded to approach Leplin's work with a kindly tolerance, suitable to a gallant effort by an afflicted fellow human, they were immediately put straight by Leplin's music. It is a big, vital, masculine, muscular work. It defies you to pity a man who can blow such life into a big orchestra with his mind.

Alfred Frankenstein called it: "...a big symphony, an immensely complex, difficult and dramatic work, full of ironic and philosophic commentary on the world of the present day, and magnificently vital in its rhythms, its handling of the grand orchestra, and its marshalling of heroic forms." Alexander Fried wrote: "The symphony comments on man's physical achievements, until human progress edges over into distress and fear. Then it seeks ideals by which man may make his peace with the world, and reach for a higher future. In its musical idiom, Leplin's work has violent expressionist intensity, passages of lofty atmosphere and an uncommonly grand scope of orchestra thinking."

Leplin wrote two more symphonies. In January, the conductor Josef Krips came to San Mateo, sat beside Leplin, and sang the entire 45-minute Second Symphony, pausing only between movements, and demonstrating that Leplin symphonies had continuous rhythm and melody throughout. When he finished, Krips exclaimed: "It's more complicated than Stravinsky!" (as noted in Kile Smith's Discoveries From the Fleisher Collection). The Second Symphony was premiered by SFS, Krips conducting, on 19, 20, 21 of January 1966.

In the San Francisco Symphony program notes, Berkeley music professor Edward Lawton wrote: "Symphony No. Two is, as a whole, rich in thematic material, with individual sections containing as many as four separate and distinct themes. Behind them, however, two principal impulses are at work, the rhythmic and the lyric, and much is made of the opposition between these impulses—not only in large sectional areas, but also in short, rapid, dramatic juxtapositions. All of this is supported by a sensitive, natural ear for instrumental color, cultivated and schooled by Mr. Leplin's years in the orchestra and as a conductor."

Leplin became the editor of a newsletter that went out to people around the Bay Area who had become paralyzed by polio called The Spokesman—Voice of the Handicapped. Leplin inserted doodles, and wrote political columns advocating for disability rights.

Leplin's composition Music For Festive Services was premiered in 1965, with Darius Milhaud in attendance. Alexander Fried wrote of two passages: "Their beauty has mystic vision." In The San Francisco Symphony—Music, Maestros, and Musicians, Leplin's friend and fellow San Francisco Symphony musician David Schneider wrote: "I had known Emanuel since our early teens, and he was one of the most vital persons I've ever known."

On October 13, 1972, the Little Symphony of the SFS Orchestra performed the second part of Leplin's Divertimento for Chamber Orchestra, entitled Firecracker.

In November 1972, Leplin was in an accident and he died on December 2. In the week following his death, the San Francisco Symphony, led by Seiji Ozawa, performed his five-minute piece Elegy for Albert Elkus. A note in the program dedicated the concerts to Leplin. Alfred Frankenstein wrote: "The 'Elegy' speaks gently and affectingly to the personalities of both men. It is warm and lyric in an idiom that suggests the Hindemith tradition. Spacious, beautifully phrased lines and rich sonorities are combined handsomely, an unpretentious statement that sings on the instruments easily, a natural and genuine inspiration. Ozawa and the Orchestra performed it with affectionate spirit and feeling."

Leplin left behind him many unperformed works for orchestra including (in addition to those already mentioned) Symphony No. 3, the Violin Concerto, five string quartets, numerous other chamber pieces, and the first twenty pages of a piano concerto. All of Leplin's orchestral works are housed in, and may be borrowed from, the Edwin A. Fleisher Collection of Orchestral Music at the Free Library of Philadelphia Ten scores are housed at the Emanuel Leplin archive of the San Francisco History Center of the San Francisco Public Library, and 28 of his pieces are housed in the Jean Gray Hargrove Music Library of the University of California, Berkeley.
