= Violet Nelson =

Canadian actress

Violet Nelson is a Kwakwakaʼwakw and Honduran actress from Canada. She is most noted for her performance as Rosie in the film The Body Remembers When the World Broke Open, for which she received a Vancouver Film Critics Circle nomination for Best Actress in a Canadian Film at the Vancouver Film Critics Circle Awards 2019, and a Canadian Screen Award nomination for Best Lead Actress at the 8th Canadian Screen Awards in 2020.
