= Family Portrait (2023 film) =

2023 film directed by Lucy Kerr

- Film poster
- Directed by: Lucy Kerr
- Written by: Lucy Kerr
- Starring: Rachel Alig; Miriam Spumpkin; Deragh Campbell
- Production company: Conjuring Productions
- Distributed by: Factory 25
- Release date: August 2023 (Locarno)
- Running time: 73 minutes
- Country: United States
- Language: English

Family Portrait is a 2023 drama film directed by Lucy Kerr (in her directorial debut), starring Deragh Campbell, Rachel Alig, Miriam Spumpkin, Katie Folger, and Chris Galust. It follows a family that gets together somewhere in Texas to have their photograph taken for a Christmas card.

== Cast ==
- Rachel Alig as Annabelle
- Miriam Spumpkin as Sally
- Deragh Campbell as Katy
- Katie Folger as Grace
- Chris Galust as Olek
- Vanessa Cedotal as Maria

== Release ==
Family Portrait premiered in Switzerland in 2023 as part of the Locarno Film Festival.

=== Critical reception ===
On the review aggregator website Rotten Tomatoes, 96% of 23 critics' reviews are positive. On Metacritic, the film has a weighted average score of 72 out of 100 based on 7 critics, which the site labels as "generally favorable" reviews.

Carlos Aguilar of Variety gave the film a highly positive review, calling it "unnerving" and noting that "Kerr exhibits a deft control over her visually economical, experimental leaps." Brian Tallerico, writing for RogerEbert.com, gave the film 3 stars out of 4, calling it a "unique, confidently made film that very purposefully plays more like a dream than realism." William Repass of Slant Magazine praised the film's "atmosphere of dread."
