= Frida Betrani =

Canadian actress

- Born: Beirut, Lebanon
- Occupation: actress
- Known for: Last Wedding
- Spouse: Tom Scholte (m. 2004)

Frida Betrani is a Canadian actress. She is most noted for her performance as Zipporah in the 2001 film Last Wedding, for which she won the Vancouver Film Critics Circle award for Best Actress in a Canadian Film at the Vancouver Film Critics Circle Awards 2001.

Born in Beirut, Lebanon, she moved to Canada with her family in childhood and grew up in Montreal, Quebec, later moving to Vancouver, British Columbia. She is an alumna of the American Academy of Dramatic Arts.

She also appeared in the films Dirty, No More Monkeys Jumpin' on the Bed, Prozac Nation, Lola, Lucky Stars, The Deal, Crime and Sisters & Brothers, and has had supporting and guest roles in television including recurring roles in Northwood and Stargate SG-1.

She married actor Tom Scholte in 2004.
