= Danny (2019 film) =

2019 film

- Film poster
- Directed by: Aaron Zeghers; Lewis Bennett
- Starring: Danny Ryder
- Cinematography: Danny Ryder
- Edited by: Aaron Zeghers; Lewis Bennett
- Release date: April 2019 (BAFICI)
- Running time: 50 minutes
- Country: Canada
- Language: English

Danny is a Canadian documentary film, directed by Aaron Zeghers and Lewis Bennett and released in 2019. The film is a portrait of Zeghers's uncle Danny Ryder, compiled entirely from VHS footage Ryder recorded of himself in the 1990s during his fatal battle with leukemia.

The film received a Vancouver Film Critics Circle award nomination for Best Canadian Documentary at the Vancouver Film Critics Circle Awards 2019.
