= Project Ithaca =

2019 Canadian science fiction thriller film

- Film poster
- Directed by: Nicholas Humphries
- Written by: Anthony Artibello; Kevin C. Bjerkness
- Produced by: Anthony Artibello; Jason Ross Jallet; James Milligan
- Starring: James Gallanders
- Distributed by: Saban Films
- Release date: 7 June 2019 (United States)
- Country: Canada
- Language: English

Project Ithaca is a 2019 Canadian science fiction thriller film directed by Nicholas Humphries and starring James Gallanders.

== Plot ==
The film begins in a secret government lab run by the U.S. War Department, where a mysterious young girl is shown interfacing with alien technology recovered during the Roswell UFO incident. The young girl has strong telepathic abilities, and is able to relate her experiences in the alien device by typing them out on a computer monitor. The girl, called Sera, begins to die due to her interaction with the machine, and is rescued by a researcher named John.

The film then switches to a diverse group of humans aboard a UFO orbiting Earth, where the group is being held against their will. Each human is restrained separately, in a harness where their arms and legs are restrained by black tentacles. The tentacles tighten as they resist, and the energy created by their emotional responses is harnessed by the ship. When the humans fail to have enough emotional responses to provide energy for the ship, the ship responds by sending larger tentacles into the room, which envelop their heads and create a direct telepathic link with the ship, and they are taunted into responding emotionally.

It is revealed that each of the humans was abducted during different periods in Earth's history, ranging from the 20th to the 21st century, and that Sera is a human-alien hybrid whose mother was pregnant at the time of the Roswell encounter; Sera's powers come from being exposed in-utero to alien spores shed by the crashed UFO. None of the group know what the current year is, nor do they know how long they’ve been on the ship. Most of the group are merely regarded as missing people back on Earth, except for Zack, a famous musician of his time whose disappearance led to his girlfriend being convicted of his “murder”.

Sera and John determine that Sera, who can interface with the ship in the present as well as the past, can free the humans on the ship, but only by sacrificing herself. Despite John’s protests, she frees the groups and they return to Earth, where they begin walking toward a city in the distance. Sera is then shown directly linked to the ship's computer. The ship uses Sera to “open the door” to a larger alien fleet, which then arrives in Earth's solar system.

In a mid-credits scene, Sera unsuccessfully attempts to contact John on the computer monitor in the past.

== Cast ==
- James Gallanders as John Brighton
- Konima Parkinson-Jones as Rhonda Woods
- Alex Woods as Zack Chase
- Deragh Campbell as Sera
- Daniel Fathers as Perry Bulmer
- Caroline Raynaud as Alex Gauthier

== Release ==
The film was released in select theaters and VOD in the United States on 7 June 2019.
