= Kathleen Parlow =

Canadian violinist (1890–1963)

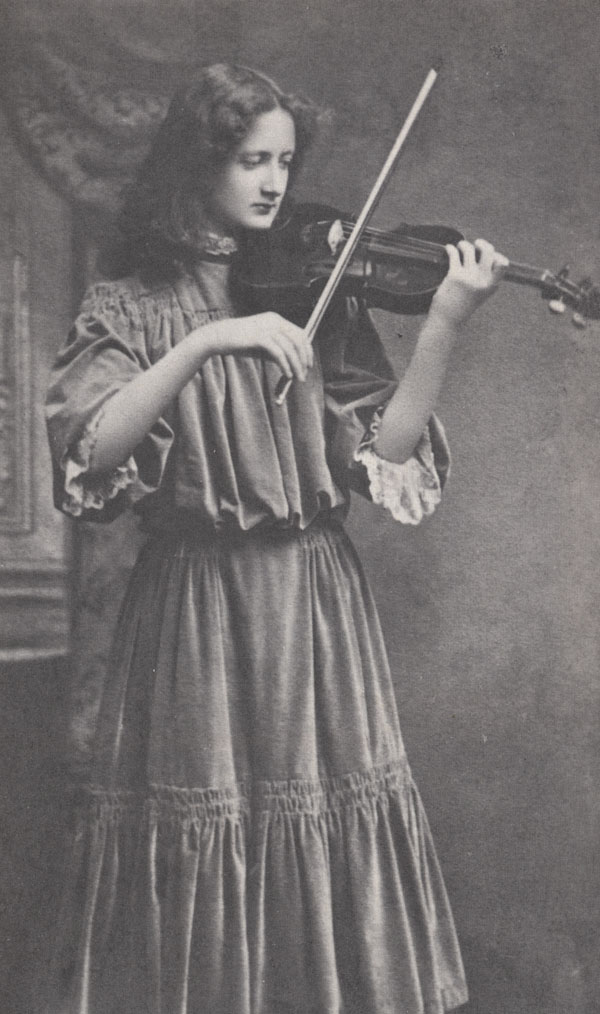
- Parlow in 1905

Background information
- Born: Kathleen Parlow; September 20, 1890; Fort Calgary, Northwest Territories (now Alberta)
- Died: August 19, 1963 (aged 72)
- Genre: Classical
- Occupation: Musician
- Instrument: Violin
- Formerly of: South Mountain Parlow Quartet, The Canadian Trio, Parlow String Quartet

Kathleen Parlow (September 20, 1890 – August 19, 1963) was a violinist known for her technique, which earned her the nickname "The lady of the golden bow". Although she left Canada at the age of four and did not permanently return until 1940, Parlow was sometimes billed as "The Canadian Violinist".

== Childhood and education ==
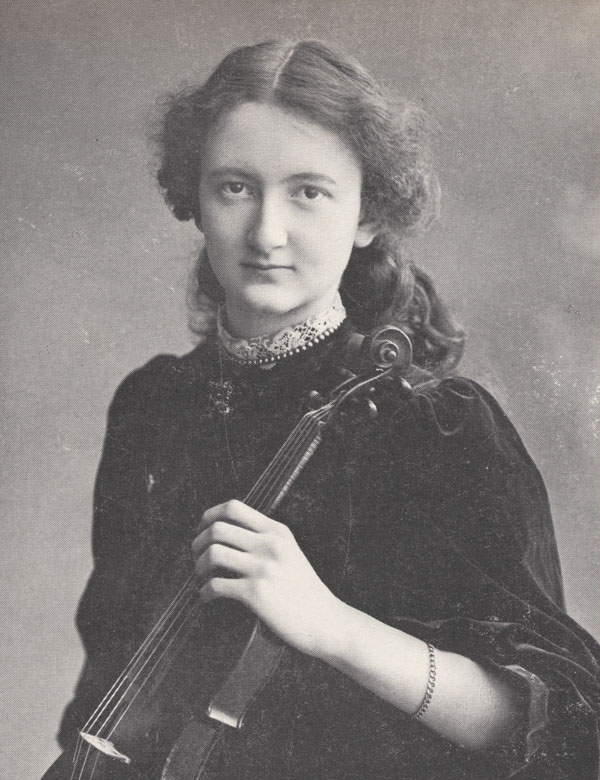
Parlow in 1905

Kathleen Parlow's mother, Minnie, took her to live in San Francisco when Kathleen was four years old. Minnie Parlow bought her daughter a half-sized violin in San Francisco and Kathleen Parlow began receiving lessons from a cousin of hers who was a professional violin teacher, Conrad Coward. Her progress was rapid with the instrument and she soon began to receive lessons from a violin professor, Henry Holmes.

To become a professional violinist and begin a concert career, Parlow moved to Europe. Parlow and her mother arrived in London on January 1, 1905. Upon attending a concert by Mischa Elman, the Parlows decided to seek out Elman's teacher, Leopold Auer. Minnie and Kathleen Parlow had arrived in London with $300 raised by their church in San Francisco, which was not sufficient to get them to Saint Petersburg, where Auer was a professor. To pay the cost of travel, the Parlows obtained a loan from Lord Strathcona, the Canadian High Commissioner. The pair travelled to Russia and in October 1906, Kathleen Parlow became the first foreigner to attend the Saint Petersburg Conservatory. In her class of forty-five students, Parlow was the only woman.

== Early concert career ==
At 17, having spent a year at the conservatory, Parlow began to put on public performances. She gave solo performances in Saint Petersburg and Helsinki. Parlow and her mother had little money and could not otherwise support themselves. Soon after, Kathleen Parlow made her professional debut in Berlin, and then began a tour of Germany, the Netherlands and Norway. In Norway she performed for King Haakon and Queen Maud, of whom she would become a favourite. There she also met Einar Bjørnson, a wealthy Norwegian (son of writer Bjørnstjerne Bjørnson) who became her friend and patron. Bjørnson purchased for Parlow a Guarnerius del Gesù violin, made in 1735. The violin cost £2000 and had previously been owned by Giovanni Battista Viotti.

Parlow travelled Europe with her mother, performing for five years. Auer remained a strong influence on Parlow, who referred to him as "Papa Auer". Her mother and Auer arranged concerts and opportunities for her, including concerts with conductors such as Thomas Beecham and Bruno Walter.

In November 1910, Parlow returned to North America for a tour. Parlow performed in New York, Philadelphia, Montreal, Quebec, Ottawa and Kingston. Her first performance with the Toronto Symphony Orchestra was on March 16, 1911. Returning to Western Canada, Parlow gave performances in Calgary, Regina, Moose Jaw, Saskatoon, Edmonton, Vancouver and Victoria. Her performances were lauded by provincial premiers.

Parlow returned to England with her mother in 1911 for further concerts. Her mother remained her travelling companion well into her adulthood. Parlow performed in the Ostend Festival, preparing again with Auer. Parlow maintained a heavy touring schedule across both Europe and North America. She participated in a benefit concert for survivors of the Titanic, and made her first recording at the request of Thomas Edison. She signed with Columbia Records.

Until 1912, Parlow performed primarily as a solo artist, but after meeting Ernesto Consolo, an Italian pianist, she began to perform chamber music.

The Parlows were in England when World War I broke out. During the war, Parlow toured neutral countries of Europe such as the Netherlands, Denmark, Norway and Sweden. She returned to North America for a tour in the spring of 1916. She went back to England, but the increasing difficulty of travel kept her there until 1919. Auer emigrated to New York around this time because of the Russian Revolution, but Parlow was working with him less.

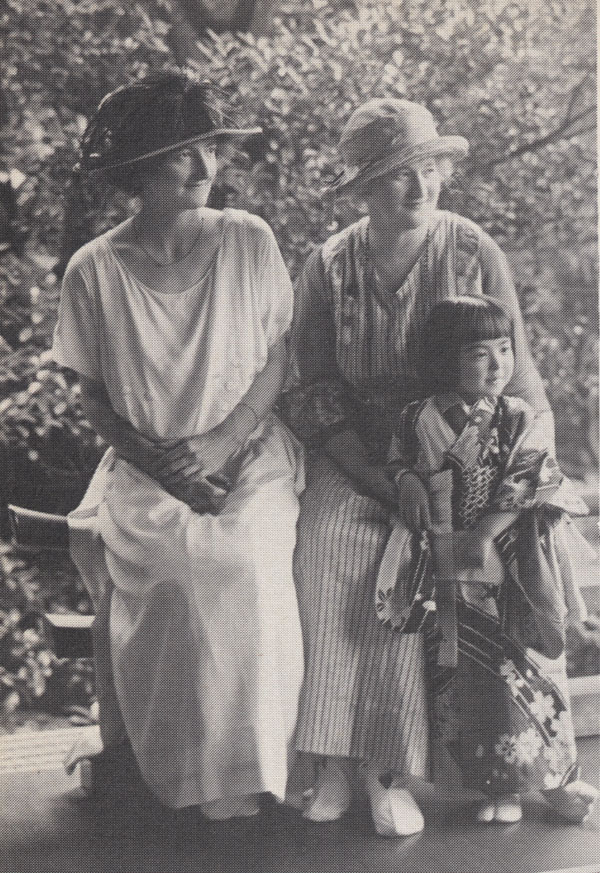
Parlow and her mother in Japan

Parlow began her fifth tour of North America in December 1920. She gave her first radio performance in Seattle in April 1922. After this, Parlow went on a 22-month tour that included Hawaii, Indonesia, China, Singapore, Korea and Japan. She made recordings for Nipponophone while in Japan.

Parlow continued touring, returning to Europe, but in 1926 she took a year-long break from performing. To renew her career, she traveled to Mexico for concerts. There she was praised by critics, but her financial situation remained poor. Her tour of Mexico in 1929 was her first without her mother.

== Later career and death ==
With her concert career not particularly profitable, Parlow looked for other career options. In 1929, she was appointed to the faculty of Mills College in Oakland, California. She received an honorary Master of Arts degree from Mills College in 1933. While at Mills College she began to play in string quartets and in 1935 she formed the South Mountain Parlow Quartet.

In 1936, Parlow accepted a position at the Juilliard School of Music. She remained there until World War II, when she returned to Canada and gave a series of lecture-recitals at The Royal Conservatory of Music in Toronto. She wrote to Ernest MacMillan about a permanent position with the Royal Conservatory of Music and obtained one in 1941. While there, she was a teacher for the singer Gisèle LaFleche, the violinist Ivan Romanoff and the conductor Victor Feldbrill.

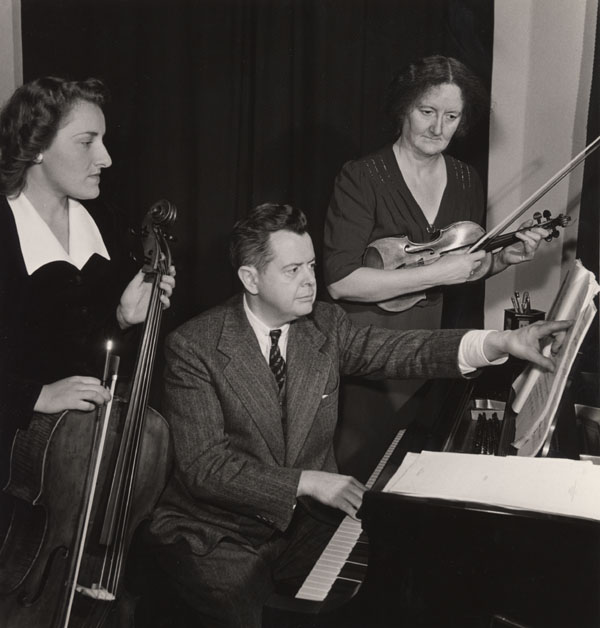
The Canadian Trio (left to right: Nelsova, MacMillan, Parlow)

She became a regular performer with the Toronto Symphony Orchestra. In Toronto, she formed the Canadian Trio with cellist Zara Nelsova and pianist Ernest MacMillan. The trio debuted with a performance of Schubert's Trio in B-flat Major, Haydn's Trio in A Major and Tchaikovsky's Trio in A minor. They received positive reviews and continued performing across Southern Ontario, as well as on radio, until 1944. The Canadian Trio earned up to $750 per performance.

Parlow started her third string quartet in 1942, called the Parlow String Quartet. The quartet included Isaac Mamott on cello, Samuel Hersenhoren on second violin and John Dembeck on viola. Parlow did all the administrative work for the quartet. The quartet gave concerts in Canada, both live and on radio, but did not travel to any other countries. Their first performance was broadcast by the Canadian Broadcasting Corporation in 1943, and they remained together for 15 years. During this time, Parlow remained the head of the quartet, but the other performers were occasionally replaced.

As Parlow's career began to decline, her financial situation became progressively worse, and Godfrey Ridout and other friends of hers established a fund to support her. In October 1959, she was appointed head of the College of Music of the University of Western Ontario, which provided a needed income.

She died on August 19, 1963, and her will set up the Kathleen Parlow Scholarship for stringed instrument players at the University of Toronto with the money from her estate and $40,000 from the sale of her violin.

== Legacy ==
A biography written by her cousin, Maida Parlow French, was published in 1967.

Canadian filmmaker Sofia Bohdanowicz has made two films, Veslemøy's Song and Measures for a Funeral, about a musicology student named Audrey Benac (portrayed by Deragh Campbell) researching Parlow's life and career. The latter film features violinist María Dueñas playing Halvorsen's Violin Concerto, which was dedicated to Parlow.

== Students of Parlow ==
- Victor Feldbrill
- Emanuel Leplin
- Joseph Pach
- Miriam Solovieff
- Clara Schranz
