= San Francisco Chamber Orchestra =

Chamber orchestra in San Francisco, California

- Chamber orchestra
- Short name: SFCO
- Founded: 1952, by Emanuel Leplin
- Location: San Francisco, California, U.S.
- Music director: Jory Fankuchen
- Website: www.thesfco.org
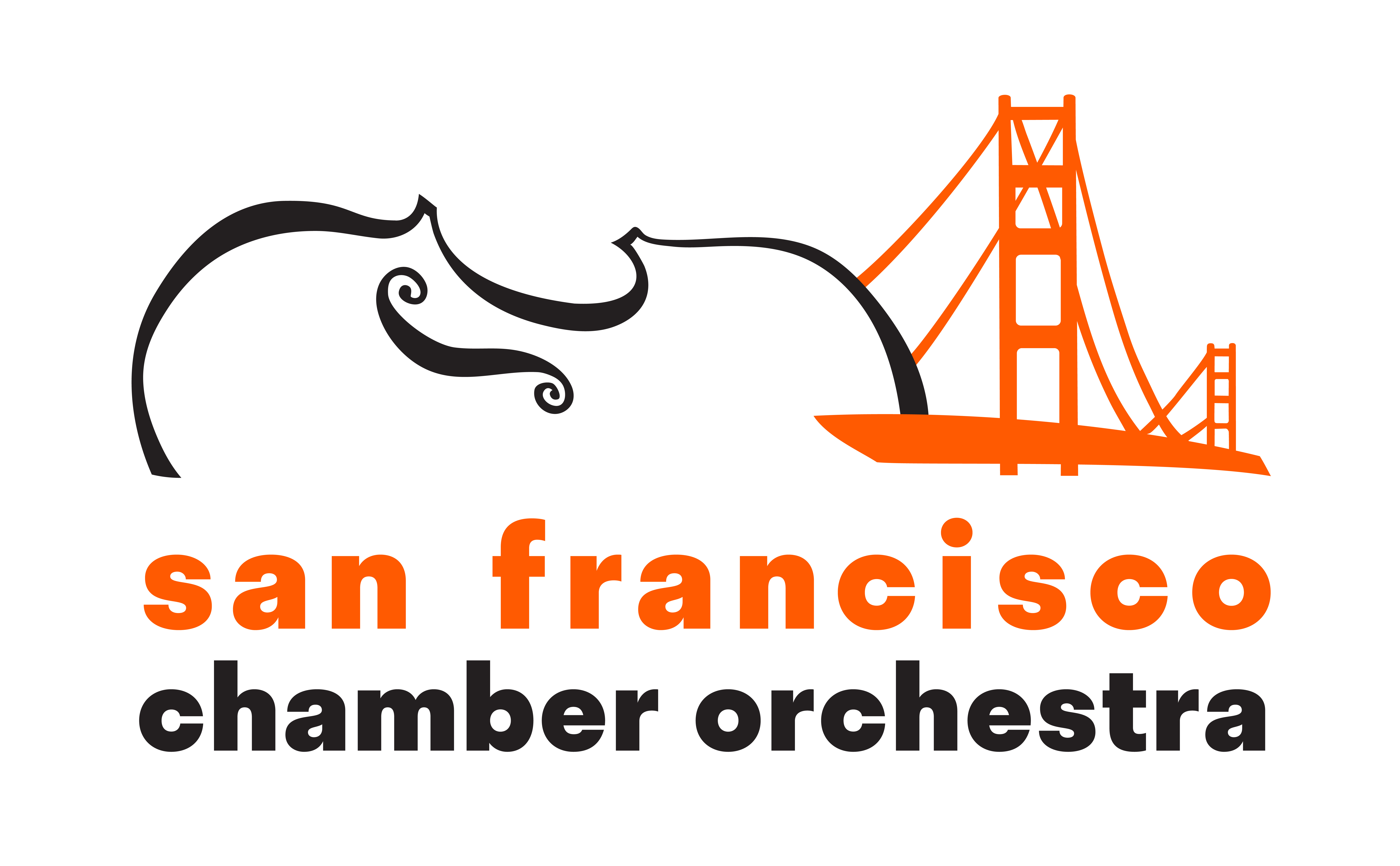

The San Francisco Chamber Orchestra (SFCO) is a professional chamber orchestra in San Francisco, California, that presents small-orchestra and chamber-ensemble performances in the Bay Area.

The SFCO was founded by Emanuel Leplin in 1952. It gave its debut concert in April 1953 at Berkeley's Hillel Foundation, in a concert conducted by Leplin. After Leplin was afflicted by polio in 1954, management was taken over by the conductors Edgar Braun and Adrian Sunshine. The musicians in the orchestra's early years were all members of the San Francisco Symphony. Sunshine left in 1958, moving to Europe. Braun served as music director and conductor until 2002, when violist Benjamin Simon took over the role.
