= Vancouver Film Critics Circle Award for Best Actress in a Canadian Film =

Canadian film award

The Vancouver Film Critics Circle Award for Best Actress in a Canadian Film is an annual award given by the Vancouver Film Critics Circle. In 2000 and 2001 the award was only given to Canadian actresses, the last few years every actress in a Canadian production can win the award.

== Winners ==
=== 2000s ===
Year	Actress	Film	Role	Reference
2000	Marie-Josée Croze	Maelström	Bibiane Champagne	
2000	Liane Balaban	New Waterford Girl	Moonie Pottie	
2000	Nancy Sivak	Protection and No More Monkeys Jumpin' on the Bed	Jane/Claire	
2001	Frida Betrani	Last Wedding	Zipporah	
2001	Katharine Isabelle	Ginger Snaps and Turning Paige	Ginger Fitzgerald / Paige Fleming	
2001	Mia Kirshner	Century Hotel	Dominique	
2002	Sonja Bennett	Punch	Ariel	
2002	Jane McGregor	Flower & Garnet	Flower	
2002	Lisa Ray	Bollywood/Hollywood	Sunita Singh	
2003	Sarah Polley	My Life Without Me	Ann	
2003	Marie-Josée Croze	The Barbarian Invasions (Les Invasions barbares)	Nathalie	
2003	Nadia Litz	Love That Boy	Phoebe	
2004	Joely Collins	The Love Crimes of Gillian Guess	Gillian Guess	
2004	Liane Balaban	Seven Times Lucky	Fiona	
2004	Jennifer Jason Leigh	Childstar	Suzanne Burnbaum	
2005	Lisa Ray	Water	Kalyani	
2005	Arsinée Khanjian	Sabah	Sabah	
2005	Lauren Lee Smith	Lie with Me	Leila	
2006	Carrie-Anne Moss	Fido	Helen Robinson	
2006	Julie Christie	Away from Her	Fiona	
2006	Tracy Wright	Monkey Warfare	Linda	
2007	Elliot Page	The Tracey Fragments	Tracey Berkowitz	
2007	Ellen Burstyn	The Stone Angel	Hagar Shipley	
2007	Naomi Watts	Eastern Promises	Anna Ivanovna Khitrova	
2008	Marianne Fortier	Mommy Is at the Hairdresser's (Maman est chez le coiffeur)	Élise Gauvin	
2008	Julianne Moore	Blindness	The Doctor's Wife	
2008	Preity Zinta	Heaven on Earth	Chand	
2009	Emily Blunt	The Young Victoria	Queen Victoria	
2009	Anne Dorval	I Killed My Mother (J'ai tué ma mère)	Chantale Lemming	
2009	Nisreen Faour	Amreeka	Muna Farah	

=== 2010s ===
Year	Actress	Film	Role	Reference
2010	Lubna Azabal	Incendies	Nawal Marwan	
2010	Molly Parker	Trigger	Kat	
2010	Tracy Wright	Trigger	Vic	
2011	Michelle Williams	Take This Waltz	Margot	
2011	Keira Knightley	A Dangerous Method	Sabina Spielrein	
2011	Vanessa Paradis	Café de Flore	Jacqueline	
2011	Ingrid Veninger	I Am a Good Person/I Am a Bad Person	Ruby	
2011	Rachel Weisz	The Whistleblower	Kathryn Bolkovac	
2012	Rachel Mwanza	War Witch (Rebelle)	Komona	
2012	Suzanne Clément	Laurence Anyways	Frédérique "Fred" Bellair	
2012	Stéphanie Lapointe	Liverpool	Émilie	
2013	Sophie Desmarais	Sarah Prefers to Run (Sarah préfère la course)	Sarah	
2013	Michelle Giroux	Blood Pressure	Nicole Trestman	
2013	Tatiana Maslany	Picture Day	Claire	
2014	Julianne Côté	You're Sleeping Nicole (Tu dors Nicole)	Nicole	
2014	Anne Dorval	Mommy	Diane Després	
2014	Dagny Backer Johnsen	Violent	Dagny	
2015	Brie Larson	Room	Joy Newsome	
2015	Marie Brassard	The Heart of Madame Sabali (Le Coeur de Madame Sabali)	Jeannette	
2015	Julia Sarah Stone	Wet Bum	Sam	
2016	Bhreagh MacNeil	Werewolf	Vanessa	
2016	Deragh Campbell	Never Eat Alone	Audrey Benac	
2016	Tatiana Maslany	The Other Half	Emily	
2017	Shirley Henderson	Never Steady, Never Still	Judy	
2017	Deragh Campbell	Fail to Appear	Isolde	
2017	Rose-Marie Perreault	Fake Tattoos (Les faux tatouages)	Mag	
2018	Arlen Aguayo-Stewart	Roads in February (Les routes en février)	Sara	
2018	Troian Bellisario	Clara	Clara	
2018	Jennifer Hardy CK	Spice It Up	Rene	
2018	Michaela Kurimsky	Firecrackers	Lou	
2019	Deragh Campbell	Anne at 13,000 Ft.	Anne	
2019	Violet Nelson	The Body Remembers When the World Broke Open	Rosie	
2019	Kacey Rohl	White Lie	Katie Arneson	

=== 2020s ===
Year	Actress	Film	Role	Ref.
2020	Madeleine Sims-Fewer	Violation	Miriam	
2020	Carrie Coon	The Nest	Alison O'Hara	
2020	Andrea Riseborough	Possessor	Tasya Vos	
2021	Alison Pill	All My Puny Sorrows	Yoli Von Riessen	
2021	Piercey Dalton	Be Still	Hannah Maynard	
2021	Elle-Máijá Tailfeathers	Night Raiders	Niska	
2022	Choi Seung-yoon	Riceboy Sleeps	So-Young	
2022	Grace Glowicki	Until Branches Bend	Robin	
2022	Hayley Law	Door Mouse	Mouse	
2023	Sara Montpetit	Humanist Vampire Seeking Consenting Suicidal Person (Vampire humaniste cherche suicidaire consentant)	Sasha	
2023	Rachel Sennott	I Used to Be Funny	Sam	
2023	Amanda Seyfried	Seven Veils	Jeanine	
2024	Maisy Stella	My Old Ass	Elliott LaBrant	
2024	Deragh Campbell	Matt and Mara	Mara	
2024	Amy Forsyth	Inedia	Cora	
2024	Keira Jang	Can I Get a Witness?	Kiah	
2025	Tatiana Maslany	Keeper	Liz	
2025	Barbie Ferreira	Mile End Kicks	Grace Pine	
2025	Iringó Réti	Blue Heron	Mother	
