= Nirvana the Band the Show =

Canadian web series

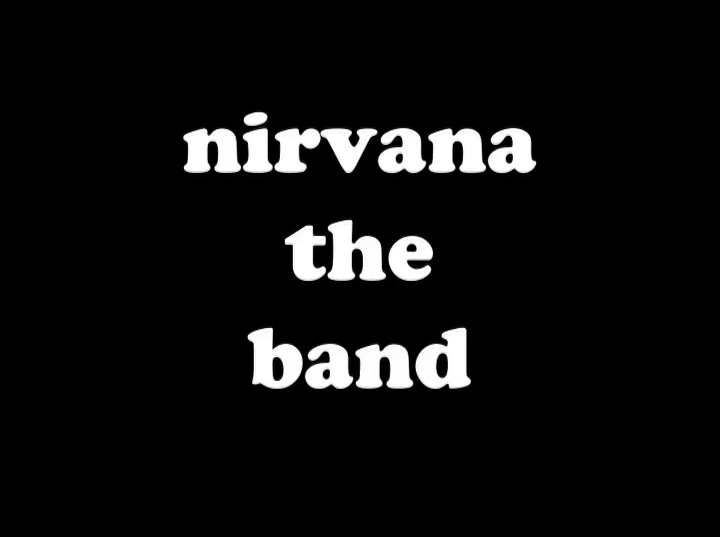
- Genre: Mockumentary; Sitcom
- Created by: Matt Johnson; Jay McCarrol
- Written by: Matt Johnson; Jay McCarrol
- Directed by: Matt Johnson
- Starring: Matt Johnson; Jay McCarrol
- Opening theme: "Pop Looks Bach" by Sam Fonteyn; Various
- Ending theme: "Smells Like Teen Spirit" by Nirvana; "Army" by Ben Folds Five
- Country of origin: Canada
- No. of episodes: 11

Production
- Production locations: Toronto, Ontario
- Running time: 10–20 minutes

Original release
- Release: 13 December 2007 – 5 November 2009

Related
- Nirvanna the Band the Show; Nirvanna the Band the Show the Movie

Nirvana the Band the Show (also called Nirvana the Band) is a Canadian docufiction sitcom web series created by Matt Johnson and Jay McCarrol. Johnson and McCarrol star as fictionalized versions of themselves, who form a musical duo titled Nirvana the Band – unrelated to the grunge band Nirvana – with the hope of performing at the Rivoli, a club in Toronto.

Nirvana the Band the Show was produced and released independently online between 2007–2009, with a single bonus episode releasing in 2010. In addition to the main episodes, various "Extras" and "Adventures" mini-episodes were produced.

The show was adapted into the 2017–2018 television series Nirvanna the Band the Show. A feature film, Nirvanna the Band the Show the Movie, premiered at SXSW on March 9, 2025.

== Synopsis ==
The series stars Matt Johnson and Jay McCarrol as fictionalized versions of themselves in a band called Nirvana the Band consisting of Jay improvising on piano and Matt doing improvised spoken word performances. The duo engage in a series of complex publicity stunts around their home city of Toronto in the hopes of landing a gig at the Rivoli, despite the fact that they have never actually written or recorded a single song, nor succeeded in contacting the Rivoli's management about booking a show.

== Cast ==
- Matt Johnson as Matt
- Jay McCarrol as Jay

== Production ==
Filmmakers Matt Johnson and Jay McCarrol met whilst attending different schools in Mississauga, Ontario, and subsequently produced student films together. Whilst at a Jumbo Video store one night, Johnson and McCarrol riffed on the idea of two characters who desperately wanted to play a show at the Rivoli, a venue in Toronto which they lived near at the time. Additionally, Johnson and McCarrol were inspired by the comedy group The Kids in the Hall, who got their start at the Rivoli.

Matt came up with the name... 'They're called Nirvana! Nirvana the Band!' Just to make it dumber. We had this one conversation, we laughed, then, boom. Forever.

— McCarrol in 2025

Regarding the fictional band's name, Johnson stated in 2024: "We were trying to play these characters who were so divorced from the culture and what people our age really should have thought was cool and ironic. We wanted them to unironically not know that that name was not appropriate for a band. It just seemed like there was no other band that embodied being with it more than Nirvana did." Johnson stated that the show's biggest influence is the 2002 documentary Comedian, and has also compared it to the animated television series Pinky and the Brain (1995 –1998).

Much of the show's dialogue and plot is improvised, with regular contributions from non-actors, such as bystanders or local business employees. Each episode's story is developed ahead of time, with Johnson and McCarrol acting without a direct script. Scenes were frequently reshot, and episodes were uploaded and then re-uploaded with new edits by Johnson at later dates.

== Episodes ==
=== Series (2007–09) ===
| No. overall | No. in season | Title | Directed by | Written by | Original release date |
|---|---|---|---|---|---|
| 1 | 1 | "The Beginning" | Matt Johnson | Matt Johnson, Jay McCarrol | 13 December 2007 |
After having rehearsed at their apartment, Matt calls the Rivoli to book a show; The staff request a press package which he delivers to a woman standing near the bar.
| 2 | 2 | "The Buzz" | Matt Johnson | Matt Johnson, Jay McCarrol | 21 December 2007 |
In an attempt to garner attention from the Rivoli's staff and clientele, Matt and Jay erect flyers around Toronto. In the final minutes of the episode, they realise that the flyers contain no information about the band other than their name. When the two reach their apartment, they attempt to impersonate the owner of another venue, calling the Rivoli and telling the manager, Vince Valence, that he can't have Nirvana the Band in order to make him jealous. Opening Title: Growing Pains
| 3 | 3 | "The Break-In" | Matt Johnson | Matt Johnson, Jay McCarrol | January 2008 |
Disguised as the Rivoli's (fictitious) manager, Vince Valence, Matt attempts to book the band himself by sneaking into his office and finding his schedule. When he fails to do so, he hurriedly creates a folder on Vince's desktop named "Nirvana the band should play the Rivoli". Opening Title: Frasier
| 4 | 4 | "The Basement" | Matt Johnson | Matt Johnson, Jay McCarrol | January 2008 |
Matt and Jay break into Valence's house, and hide in his basement when he returns unexpectedly early. Whilst trapped, Jay flashes back to his relationship with Matt's sister, Amelia, which came to end when Jay joined Nirvana the Band, while Matt flashes back to unimportant events. When the coast is clear, the pair steal the booking schedule and run. Opening Title: Lost
| 5 | 5 | "The Banned" | Matt Johnson | Matt Johnson, Jay McCarrol | January 2008 |
Matt, having blinded himself by staring at the sun, insists on going back to the Rivoli in disguise as a blind person like in Robin Hood, given that he and Jay have now been banned from the premises for breaking into Valence's house. As he leaves, he knocks into a large pile of books and accidentally swaps the unedited schedule for a copy of Treasure Island belonging to another client at the Rivoli. Matt is hit by a car, hospitalizing him. When Matt lies in hospital to recover, Jay reads Treasure Island aloud to him. Opening Title: CSI: Miami
| 6 | 6 | "The B-Day" | Matt Johnson | Matt Johnson, Jay McCarrol | July 2008 |
In a chance encounter, Matt and Jay try to recover the booking schedule from the customer who took it, only to learn that he returned it to the staff at the bar. A desperate Jay throws a last minute birthday Masquerade for Matt, unknowingly hiring his sister Amelia to strip for him. After he curses a hole on Wii Sports golf, Matt kicks Jay from the band's lineup. Opening Title: Trailer for The Wackness
| 7 | 7 | "The Battle of the Bands" | Matt Johnson | Matt Johnson, Jay McCarrol | 31 October 2008 |
Following the breakup, both Matt and Jay experiment with new bandmates. Matt meets with the Born Ruffians, while Jay holds open auditions. Jay's eventual pick steals his Halloween candy, causing Jay to immediately split up with his new bandmate. Upon returning to the apartment, Jay finds Matt has hung himself in the living room, before Matt reveals it was a prank. The two reconcile and reform Nirvana The Band. Opening Title: It's the Great Pumpkin, Charlie Brown
| 8 | 8 | "The Burn" | Matt Johnson | Matt Johnson, Jay McCarrol | January 2009 |
After Matt and Jay break into Valence's house to place a wiretap in an attempt to blackmail him, Jay is insulted by a passerby with Matt then claiming he was called an antisemitic slur and should stand up for himself. They also attempt to contact Rivoli employees under the guise of being FBI agents, asking for any incriminating evidence regarding Vince, with no eventual result. Jay, after reminiscing being insulted by Matt for not standing up for himself, burns down the apartment of the man who insulted him, to which Matt reveals he was never called a slur in the first place. The following morning, Jay sees that Valence has been recorded saying an antisemitic slur to a Jewish charity. Opening Title: The Wire
| 9 | 9 | "The Band" | Matt Johnson | Matt Johnson, Jay McCarrol | 3 June 2009 |
The band write a ransom note to Valence but after receive troubling news that there is already a band with whom they share part of their name. After getting a bill of copyright clearance from former member Ronnie Hawkins, Matt absentmindedly tears it up. As the two begin to quarrel, Jay receives a phonecall informing him that his band is to play at the Rivoli tomorrow. Matt and Jay reminisce about their childhood memories with each other. Originally released in two parts. Opening Title: The Wonder Years
| 10 | 10 | "The Rivoli" | Matt Johnson | Matt Johnson, Jay McCarrol | 5 November 2009 |
Matt wakes up Jay for a last minute rehearsal for when they play the Rivoli the same night. Jay lives the day leading up to them playing the Rivoli multiple times in his dreams, his dream ending right as they're onstage every time. When Jay finally awakens for real, the two make it to the Rivoli and are confronted by Vince Valence. Matt shoots Vince, presumably killing him before he is able to talk to them.

=== Bonus Episode (2010) ===
| No. overall | No. in season | Title | Directed by | Written by | Original release date |
|---|---|---|---|---|---|
| 11 | 1 | "The Buena Vista Social Club" | Matt Johnson | Matt Johnson, Jay McCarrol | 2010 |
While Jay is at home composing his own soundtrack for the movie Madagascar 2, Matt is in Cuba looking for the Buena Vista Social Club. Opening Title: Star Trek

== Extras and Adventures ==
Additional "Extras" and "Adventures" mini-episodes were produced alongside the main episodes. Among these mini-episodes is "Update Day", a 2 and a half minute sketch where Jay sings the titles of Wii Shop Channel Virtual Console games to the tune of the Wii Shop Channel song, to Matt's bewilderment. "Update Day" went viral, with Johnson later remarking "I think 95% of people who'd ever even heard of us is explicitly from ["Update Day"]."
