= No More Monkeys Jumpin' on the Bed =

2000 Canadian feature film

- Directed by: Ross Weber
- Written by: Ross Weber
- Produced by: Paul Scherzer; Ross Weber
- Starring: Tom Scholte; Frida Betrani; Nancy Sivak; Cam Cronin
- Cinematography: A. Jonathan Benny
- Edited by: Ross Weber
- Music by: Sean Dimitrie
- Production company: Jumpin' on the Bed Productions
- Distributed by: L'Étranger Film Productions
- Release date: September 26, 2000 (VIFF)
- Running time: 76 minutes
- Country: Canada
- Language: English

No More Monkeys Jumpin' on the Bed is a Canadian comedy film, directed by Ross Weber and released in 2000. The film centres on a group of young urban professionals in Vancouver, British Columbia, who are navigating complications in establishing both their careers and their love lives.

The film's central characters are Peter (Tom Scholte), who is dealing with friction in his relationship with his girlfriend Fiona (Frida Betrani); Fiona develops an outside attraction to a bisexual man, while Peter finds himself rekindling his old attraction to Claire (Nancy Sivak), a friend who is also having relationship difficulties of her own with her boyfriend Lyle (Cam Cronin). Susan (Sophie Yendole), meanwhile, is beginning to drink excessively to numb her emotions around her inability to find steady employment or a relationship, while Rick (Erik Whittaker), is an artist who is growing bored with his frequent one-night stands with women.

The cast also includes Babz Chula, Laurie Baranyay, Marya Delver, Peter Grier, George Majoros and Caroline Adderson in supporting roles.

The film was shot in 1998, but was not released until 2000 as Weber had difficulty securing funding to complete post-production. It premiered at the 2000 Vancouver International Film Festival.

== Awards ==
At VIFF, Weber won the award for Best Emerging Western Canadian Director.

At the Vancouver Film Critics Circle Awards 2000, Sivak was nominated for Best Actress in a Canadian Film for both No More Monkeys and Protection, and the film was nominated for "Best Off-Indie".
