= Jay Scott Prize =

Canadian film award

The Jay Scott Prize is an annual film award presented by the Toronto Film Critics Association, in conjunction with commercial sponsor Stella Artois, to an emerging talent in the Canadian film industry.

First presented in 2009, the award was named in memory of influential Canadian film critic Jay Scott. The award has been most commonly presented to film directors, but has also been given to actors; it is generally given to a filmmaker or performer who has achieved a significant career breakthrough in the previous year, but is ultimately given in consideration of the recipient's overall body of work rather than for that specific work.

The winner of the award receives $10,000.

== Sponsors ==
From 2009 to 2012, the prize was sponsored by Deluxe. From 2013 to 2015, the prize was sponsored by Scotiabank. As of 2016, the prize is sponsored by Anheuser-Busch InBev, brewers of Stella Artois, and is now known as the Stella Artois Jay Scott Prize.

== Winners ==
- 2009: Xavier Dolan
- 2010: Daniel Cockburn
- 2011: Ingrid Veninger
- 2012: Nicolás Pereda
- 2013: Matt Johnson
- 2014: Albert Shin
- 2015: Anne Émond
- 2016: Ashley McKenzie
- 2017: Sofia Bohdanowicz
- 2018: Molly McGlynn
- 2019: Deragh Campbell
- 2020: Kelly Fyffe-Marshall
- 2021: Bretten Hannam
- 2022: Carol Nguyen
- 2023: Ariane Louis-Seize
- 2024: J Stevens
- 2025: Xiaodan He
