= Because We Are Girls =

2019 documentary film

- Film poster
- Directed by: Baljit Sangra
- Written by: Baljit Sangra, Carmen Pollard
- Produced by: Shirley Vercruysse; Selwyn Jacob
- Starring: Jeeti Pooni; Kira Pooni; Salakshana Pooni
- Cinematography: Vince Arvidson; Grant Baldwin; Thomas Billingsley
- Edited by: Carmen Pollard, Jessica Demond
- Music by: Genevieve Vincent
- Production company: National Film Board of Canada
- Release date: May 2, 2019 (Hot Docs)
- Running time: 85 minutes
- Country: Canada
- Language: English

Because We Are Girls is a Canadian documentary film, directed by Baljit Sangra and released in 2019. The film centres on Jeeti, Kira and Salakshana Pooni, three Punjabi Canadian sisters from Williams Lake, British Columbia who have gone public in adulthood about allegations of childhood sexual abuse by a cousin who frequently babysat them as children.

The film was slated to premiere at the 2018 Vancouver International Film Festival, but the screening was pulled from the festival as the sisters' court case against their cousin was still pending. It instead premiered at the 2019 Hot Docs Canadian International Documentary Festival, and had its first screening in British Columbia at the DOXA Documentary Film Festival.

The film received two nominations at the Vancouver Film Critics Circle Awards 2019, for Best Canadian Documentary and Best British Columbia Film.
