= Greetings from Isolation =

Canadian film project

Greetings from Isolation is a Canadian film project, launched in 2020 during the COVID-19 pandemic in Canada. Created by film programmer Stacey Donen as an "online film festival", the project features short films by Canadian film directors, created exclusively with whatever cast and equipment resources they had with them during COVID-related lockdowns.

As of January 15, 2021, 92 films premiered on the project website.

Norman Wilner of Now favourably reviewed the first batch of films on the site, writing that "there's a fascinating range of approaches and tones, and it's endlessly interesting to see how the individual artists respond to Donen's challenge and its limitations. More often than not, they employ themselves as their own actors – because of course they'd have to – but that just makes the shorts feel even more personal and engaging. How many of these filmmakers have ever put themselves at the centre of their own work?"

The project was listed as a qualifying streaming platform for the 9th Canadian Screen Awards, although no films from it actually received nominations.

== Films ==
- Benjamin Ayres, Nada Sleep
- Laura Bari, Si
- Daniel Barrow, Advanced Search Terms
- Christina Battle, The Time It Takes to Hear It
- Raphael Bendahan, From 9 O'Clock
- Will Bhaneja, The Shed
- Kara Blake, Cohabitat
- Roger Boyer, Journey to Nothing
- Dan Browne, Glimmer
- Valerie Buhagiar, The Company
- Cliff Caines, a garden path, a garden path
- Miryam Charles, I've Known Rivers
- Katerina Cizek, Window Visits
- Daniel Cross, Tire(d)
- Simon Davidson, Words
- Martha Davis, Housebound
- Robert Dayton, Pandemic Get Away
- Winston DeGiobbi, Like a Horse in Quarantine
- James Dunnison, Bits and Pieces
- Corinne Dunphy, Before the Story Is a Story
- Francisca Duran, change over time
- Ann Marie Fleming, Vancouver April 2020 18:59:30 PT
- Sadaf Foroughi, Chronicle of a Spring
- Heather Frise, I Just Want to Wake Up
- Janine Fung, What Is Home?
- Richard Fung, [...]
- Simon Gadke, Backup Camera
- Sarah Galea-Davis and Dave Derewlany, Safe at Home
- Alexandra Grimanis and Steven Woloshen, Try to Remain Calm
- John Greyson, Prurient
- Julia Hart and Samantha Kane, Solace
- Dana Inkster, Breakdown #29
- Ali Kazimi, Being & Birding in Pandemic Times
- Yuqi Kang, In This Moment
- Larry Kent, Short Film No. 6
- Taravat Khalili, The Garden
- Celeste Koon, An Isolated Day Full of Strange Isolated Events
- Elizabeth Lazebnik, I Want to Tell You Something
- Nadia Litz, Alphelion
- Rob Leickner, An Event
- Keith Lock, Lock Down
- Terryll Loffler, I Can See the Future
- Brenda Longfellow, Lockdown
- Jorge Lozano, X-Ray(s)
- Peter Lynch, My Pandemonia
- Gabriela Macleod, Dirty Talk
- Vanessa Magic, Ghosting
- Anna Maguire, 29 Doors
- Liz Marshall, Landscape
- Asghar Massombagi, A Dream of Self Isolation
- Lindsay McIntyre, Stand By
- Robin McKenna, Weather
- Ryan McKenna, Gerson Workout
- Araya Mengesha, A Day for Love
- Jacquelyn Mills, Afloat
- Noël Mitrani, To Limit the Spread
- Milos Mitrovic, Wasting Time at the End of the World
- Esery Mondesir, Qui ose rire dans le noir? (Who Dares to Laugh in the Dark?)
- Aaron Munson, A Time Out
- Solomon Nagler, Typhoid Aphorisms
- Justina Neepin, To Do List
- Kelly O'Brien, A Walk in the Park
- Ryan O'Toole, Cloud Elastic
- Emily Piggford, Greet Your Shadow
- John Price, Certain Uncertainties
- Matthew Rankin, A Grief Observed
- Lisa Rideout, Seeing Absence
- Mike Rollo, moments between moments
- Sophy Romvari, Oh, to Realize
- Peter Rowe, Dying to Tell You
- Jeffrey St. Jules, Int. House - Day/Night
- Dylan Akio Smith, Breakout
- Barbara Sternberg, Once I Am
- Brett Story, The Cop in Our Heads and the Cop in Our Hearts
- Shabnam Sukhdev, ...this instant
- Leslie Supnet, Sing to Me the Song
- Rolla Tahir, once there was once there wasn't
- Ho Tam, Isolation Journal
- Blaine Thurier, Sing, O Muse
- Gariné Torossian, To Make a Garden
- Ana Valine, Holding
- Guillaume Vallée, are you haunted, daddy? (about anxiety)
- Fabian Velasco, How to Make Traditional Pesto Italian Style
- Ingrid Veninger, Dreams, Memories and Midges
- Jay Cardinal Villeneuve, Nôhcimihk (in the bush)
- Daniel Warth, Panoramic Sleights
- Haya Waseem, Lahore Lunch
- JL Whitecrow, Bundle
- Curtis L. Wiebe, Squiggleface Lumpybear and Beatrice the Dog Try Video Chat
- Janine Windolph, Ayapiyâhk ôma niyanân (Only us, we are here at home)
- BH Yael, Isolation ABC
- Alan Zweig, On the Road

== See also ==
- The Curve
