= Montreal Critics' Week =

Canadian film festival

Montreal Critics' Week (French: Semaine de la critique de Montréal) is a Canadian film festival, staged in Montreal, Quebec, since 2025. Organized by the Quebec film magazine Panorama-cinéma and taking place for one week each January, the non-competitive event highlights a program of feature and short films by emerging directors that challenge the mainstream conventions of commercial film.

== 2025 ==
The first event was staged from January 13 to 19, 2025.

English title	Original title	Director(s)	Production country
Base Station		Park Sye-young, Yeon Ye-ji	South Korea
Eephus		Carson Lund	United States
Fertile Memory	Mémoire fertile	Michel Khleifi	Palestine, Belgium
Fujiyama Cotton		Taku Aoyagi	Japan
Let the Red Moon Burn		Ralitsa Doncheva	Canada, Bulgaria
Lost Chapters	Los capítulos perdidos	Lorena Alvarado	Venezuela, United States
Louis Riel, or Heaven Touches the Earth	Louis Riel, ou Le ciel touche la terre	Matias Meyer	Canada
A Man Imagined		Melanie Shatzky, Brian M. Cassidy	Canada
Merman		Ana Lungu	Romania
Now He Is in the Truth		Roberto Tarazona	Cuba
7 Walks with Mark Brown	Sept promenades avec Mark Brown	Pierre Creton, Vincent Barré	France
A Shrine		Abdolreza Kahani	Canada, Iran, France
Spiders Web		Frank Dunsten, Ben Roberts, Oliver Roberts	Canada
Super Happy Forever		Kohei Igarashi	Japan, France
Taman-Taman (Park)		So Yo-Hen	Taiwan
Twilight		Park Sye-young	South Korea
Two Cuckolds Go Swimming		Winston DeGiobbi	Canada
UNDR		Kamal Aljafari	Palestine, Germany
Universal Language	Une langue universelle	Matthew Rankin	Canada

== 2026 ==
The second event took place from January 12 to 18, 2026.

English title	Original title	Director(s)	Production country
23 Thoughts About My Mother		Mike Hoolboom	Canada
Abortion Party		Julia Mellen	Spain
Blue Stomach		Nathan Donovan	Canada
Bury Us in a Lone Desert		Nguyễn Lê Hoàng Phúc	Vietnam
By Design		Amanda Kramer	United States
Don't Forget the Oatmeal	Oublie pas le gruau	Olivier Godin	Canada
Drunken Noodles		Lucio Castro	Argentina, United States
La dureté du mental		Charles-André Coderre	Canada
D'Époques		Samuel Terry Pitre	Canada
I'm Feeling Something		Nuno Pimentel	Portugal
Kisapmata		Mike De Leon	Philippines
Last Evenings on Earth		Ralitsa Doncheva	Canada
Last Night I Conquered the City of Thebes	Anoche conquisté Tebas	Gabriel Azorín	Spain, Portugal
Macdo		Racornelia	Mexico, Greece
Magellan		Lav Diaz	Philippines, Spain, Portugal, France, Taiwan
Nightmare's Advice	Cauchemar Conseil	Renaud Després-Larose, Ana Tapia Rousiouk	Canada
Objects Do Not Fall Randomly from the Sky		Maria Estela Paiso	Philippines
Otium		Christopher Beaulieu	Canada
Permanent Tourist		Alex Lo	Canada
Pin de Fartie		Alejo Moguillansky	Argentina
Revelations of Divine Love		Caroline Golum	United States
Six Neorealist Portraits	Six portraits néoréalistes	Robert Morin	Canada
Sweet Captive	Douce prisonnière	Paul Chotel, Ariane Falardeau St-Amour	Canada
A Thousand Waves Away		Helena Wittmann	Germany
Water Sports		Whammy Alcazaren	Philippines
Who Is Still Alive	Qui vit encore	Nicolas Wadimoff	Switzerland
