= Veslemøy's Song =

- Film Poster
- Directed by: Sofia Bohdanowicz
- Written by: Sofia Bohdanowicz
- Produced by: Sofia Bohdanowicz; Calvin Thomas
- Starring: Deragh Campbell; Joan Benac
- Cinematography: Sofia Bohdanowicz
- Edited by: Sofia Bohdanowicz
- Production company: Maison du Bonheur Films Inc.
- Release date: August 7, 2018 (Locarno)
- Running time: 9 minutes
- Country: Canada
- Language: English

Veslemøy's Song is a 2018 Canadian dramatic short film directed by Sofia Bohdanowicz. A continuation of her 2016 film Never Eat Alone, the film stars Deragh Campbell as Audrey Benac, a young woman attempting to research and recover the history of a largely forgotten female violinist and composer, Kathleen Parlow, who had taught Audrey's grandfather.

The film has its world premiere at the Locarno Film Festival on August 7, 2018. It subsequently screened at the 2018 Toronto International Film Festival, and was named by the festival to its annual year-end Canada's Top Ten list.

== Cast ==
- Deragh Campbell as Audrey Benac
- Joan Benac as herself
- Steve Benac as himself

== Production ==
Campbell portrays Audrey Benac, a character she has played for Bohdanowicz in the films Never Eat Alone (2016) and MS Slavic 7 (2019).

Soon after the film's release, Bohdanowicz indicated in interviews that she planned to expand it into a feature film. The feature, Measures for a Funeral, premiered at the 2024 Toronto International Film Festival.
