= Matt Johnson (director) =

Canadian actor and filmmaker (born 1985)

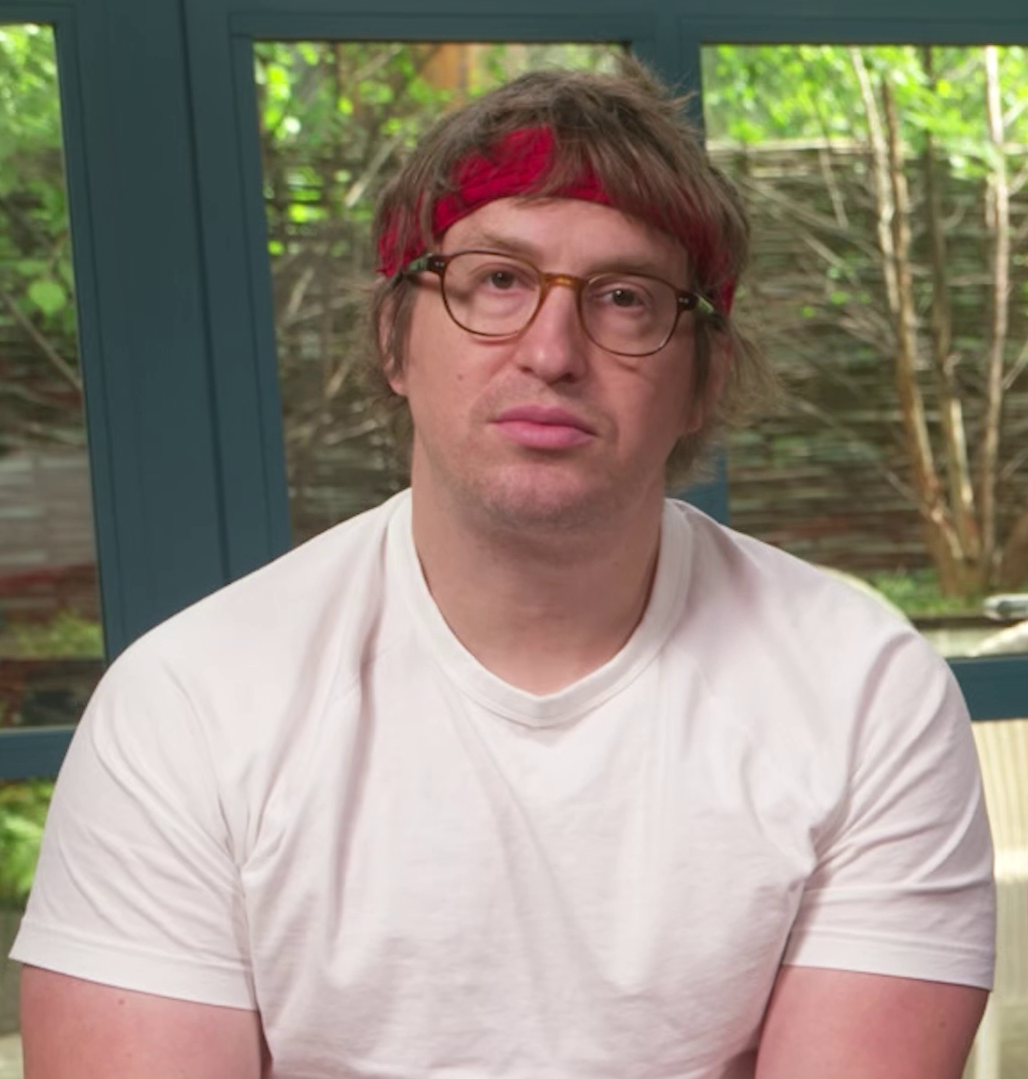
- Johnson in 2026
- Born: October 5, 1985 (age 41); Toronto, Ontario, Canada
- Education: York University (MFA)
- Occupations: Film director; producer; screenwriter; actor
- Years active: 2007–present
- Spouse: Carly Balestreri (m. 2026)

Matt Johnson (born October 5, 1985) is a Canadian filmmaker and actor. He began his career working in independent docufiction productions, and attracted accolades for his debut feature The Dirties (2013), which won Best Feature Narrative at the Slamdance Film Festival. Johnson and Jay McCarrol co-created and co-starred in the Viceland sitcom television series Nirvanna the Band the Show (2017–2018), an adaptation of their earlier web series Nirvana the Band the Show (2007–2009).

Johnson directed and starred in the conspiracy thriller Operation Avalanche (2016), playing a CIA agent involved in faking the Apollo 11 moon landing. He achieved critical and commercial success with the biopic BlackBerry (2023), winning directing awards from the Canadian Screen Awards and Vancouver Film Critics Circle. He later directed Nirvanna the Band the Show the Movie (2025) for which he won a Canadian Screen Award for his supporting performance. Tony (2026), a biopic about chef Anthony Bourdain, is his first American film.

Johnson's work includes elements of pseudo-documentary filmmaking and improvisation, often using hidden camera techniques and location filming without permits. He has frequently played fictionalized versions of himself in both his own productions and those of other filmmakers.

== Early life and education ==
Johnson was born in Toronto, Canada, on October 5, 1985. He is of Icelandic descent on his father's side. Johnson attended John Fraser Secondary School in Mississauga. During his school years, he was introduced by his then-girlfriend to Jay McCarrol, who attended nearby Erindale Secondary School. McCarrol and Johnson became friends and creative collaborators, producing many student films together.

Johnson completed an MFA at York University in 2015.

== Career ==
=== 2007–2021: Early work ===
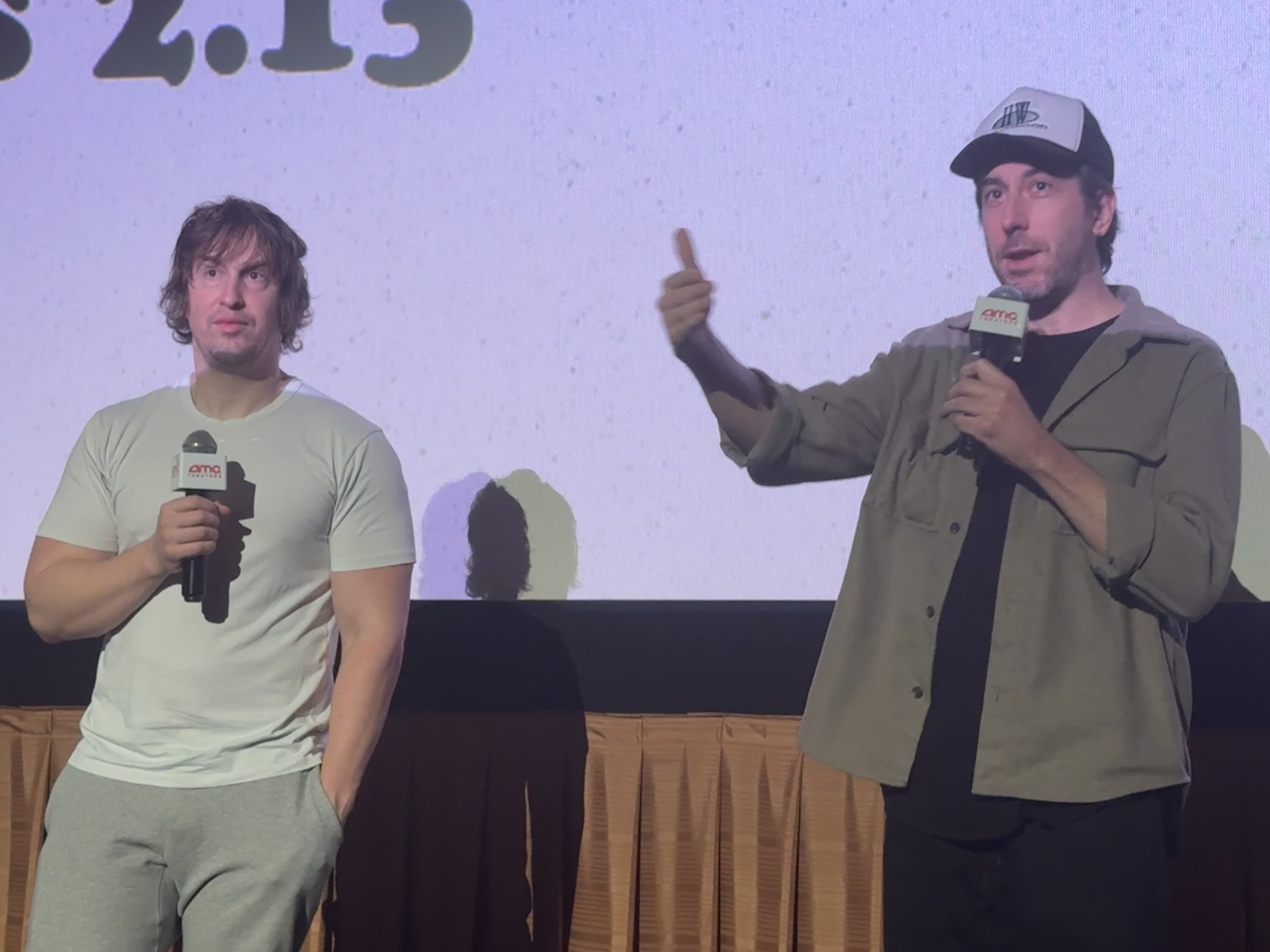
Johnson and Jay McCarrol co-created and co-starred in the Nirvanna the Band series and movie.

One of Johnson's earliest directorial works was the independent docufiction sitcom web series Nirvana the Band the Show (2007–2009), which he co-created with Jay McCarrol. Johnson and McCarrol star as fictionalised versions of themselves in a musical duo who attempt to book a gig at the Rivoli in Toronto.

Johnson achieved widespread critical acclaim in Canada with his feature directorial debut The Dirties (2013), a low-budget independent film starring Johnson as a bullied high school student. The Dirties won the Grand Jury Sparky Award for Feature Narrative at the Slamdance Film Festival, and Johnson was nominated for Best Editing at the 2nd Canadian Screen Awards.

Following The Dirties's release, Johnson and producer Matthew Miller established the production company Zapruder Films. The company's debut feature, Operation Avalanche (2016), was directed by Johnson and starred him alongside Owen Williams as CIA agents who become embroiled in a conspiracy to fake the Apollo 11 Moon landing. Operation Avalanche premiered at the Sundance Film Festival. Johnson had received an offer to premiere the film at the Toronto International Film Festival, but he declined, reasoning that the film would be lost in the large number of films shown there. Lionsgate released Operation Avalanche in the United States on September 16, 2016. The film received generally positive reviews from critics. Johnson was nominated for Best Director at the 5th Canadian Screen Awards.

Johnson and McCarrol adapted Nirvana the Band the Show into a television series, Nirvanna the Band the Show, which premiered on Viceland in 2017. Several episodes of the first season screened at the Toronto International Film Festival. Two seasons aired across 2017 and 2018. A third season was partially produced but not released due to Viceland's discontinuation. Johnson and McCarrol co-created and starred in the animated children's show Matt & Bird Break Loose (2021), a spiritual successor to Nirvanna the Band the Show.

In addition to his own productions, Johnson has acted in the film Diamond Tongues (2015), and Kazik Radwanski's films How Heavy This Hammer (2015), Anne at 13,000 Ft. (2019) and Matt and Mara (2024). Between 2018 and 2021, Johnson taught film at York University.

=== 2022–present: Career expansion ===
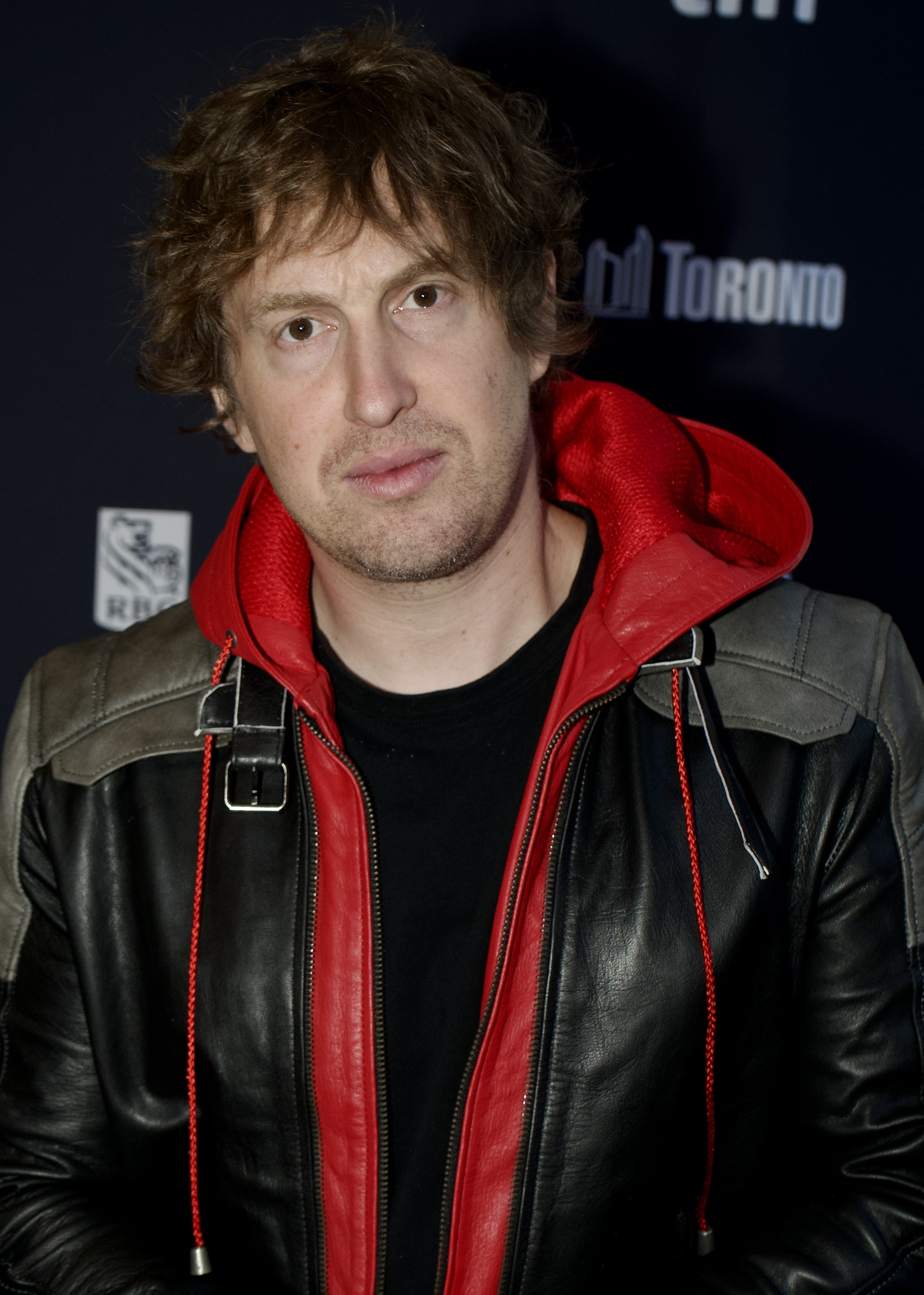
Johnson at the 2025 Toronto International Film Festival

Johnson directed the 2023 biographical film BlackBerry, which dramatises the rise and fall of the BlackBerry line of mobile phones produced by Canadian tech company Research in Motion. Co-written by Johnson and Miller, it stars Glenn Howerton as Jim Balsillie, Jay Baruchel as Mike Lazaridis, and Johnson as Douglas Fregin. BlackBerry premiered in competition at the 73rd Berlin International Film Festival on February 17, 2023, and attracted widespread critical acclaim. The film won the Rogers Best Canadian Film Award from the Toronto Film Critics Association. It also became the most nominated film in the history of the Canadian Screen Awards, with 17 nominations, and won 14 awards including Best Motion Picture and Best Director, making it the most awarded title in the organisation's history. In 2024, Johnson served as jury president of the Compétition Cheval Noir at the 28th Fantasia International Film Festival.

Following the success of BlackBerry, Johnson and McCarrol received funding from Telefilm Canada to develop a feature film adaptation of Nirvanna the Band the Show—a project they had been workshopping as early as 2009. Nirvanna the Band the Show the Movie premiered on March 9, 2025 at South by Southwest. The film won critical acclaim and was nominated for the Rogers Best Canadian Film Award at the Toronto Film Critics Association Awards 2025. It earned eight nominations at the 14th Canadian Screen Awards, winning Best Motion Picture. Johnson won the Canadian Screen Award for Best Supporting Performance in a Comedy Film. Additionally, Johnson and McCarrol won Best Original Song for "The Alphabet Song". Johnson and McCarrol reprised their roles in Joel Haver's short film Nirvanna the Band Tries to Get an Animation Made.

After BlackBerry, Johnson was "inundated" with pitches for various biopics, including for a film focusing on celebrity chef Anthony Bourdain. Following a meeting with actor Dominic Sessa, Johnson and Miller conceived that the biopic would focus on Bourdain's early career. The film, titled Tony, released in August 2026. It is Johnson's first American film as well as his first feature that he does not star in. It received positive reviews. In July 2026, Johnson directed Tony actor Stavros Halkias' stand-up special, titled Uncle Stav. Filmed over four shows in Baltimore, the special premiered on Netflix on September 8.

Johnson's next film is The Vice Guide; set in 2015, it will star Finn Wolfhard as the investigative journalist who exposed the cocaine smuggling operation led by Vice Canada music editor Slava Pastuk. The production shot in 2026 and will be distributed by Neon. Johnson will direct a film based on the card game Magic: The Gathering, starring Maya Hawke, which he plans to make as the first part of a trilogy. He is also writing the film, alongside Noah Gardner and Aidan Fitzgerald. As early as 2023, he was developing a "TSA comedy" with Josh Safdie.

== Filmmaking style and process ==
Johnson's films are often styled like documentaries, utilising handheld camerawork and an improvisational, iterative filming process. The Dirties, Operation Avalanche and Nirvanna the Band the Show and its 2025 film adaptation were not formally scripted but improvised by the actors, with Johnson and the crew continually refining the narrative structure based on the footage captured. Additionally, various scenes were shot in public spaces, often without filming permits, and involved actors improvising interactions with unsuspecting members of the public in the style of a hidden camera show; sometimes these interactions would lead to major changes in story. (Note: See coverage on the filmmaking process of The Dirties, Operation Avalanche, Nirvanna the Band the Show, and Nirvanna the Band the Show the Movie.) Johnson dislikes the description "found footage" applied to his films, preferring "fake documentary". Critics have compared his blend of fiction and documentary filmmaking to the 2006 mockumentary film Borat and the reality television series Jackass and Nathan for You.

Johnson is also an advocate of the liberal application of the concept of "fair use" in United States copyright law, (Note: Attributed to multiple sources) and has worked with lawyer Chris Perez to develop legal arguments for the use of copyrighted material in his films. The title sequence of each Nirvanna the Band the Show episode parodies the opening sequence of an established film or television series.

Johnson has frequently played fictionalized versions of himself in his own productions. For Operation Avalanche, Johnson used his own name for his character to make it easier to navigate interactions with on-screen individuals not involved in the production. Additionally, he portrayed characters named "Matt" in Anne at 13,000 Ft. and Matt and Mara. Johnson stated: "I do have a monomania about making these movies, which have taken over my life. In many ways, I think the guys I play are a chance for the Shadow Me to have a life—the outgoing, confident, consequence-free kid. The real me is an inversion of that: more risk-averse."

== Personal life ==
Johnson married filmmaker Carly Balestreri in August 2026. He has served as an executive producer on her short films.

He is fan of the video game series Hades.

== Filmography ==
=== Film ===
Key
†	Denotes films that have not yet been released

Year	Title	Director	Writer	Producer	Notes	Ref.
2013	The Dirties	Yes	Yes	Yes	Co-written and co-edited with Evan Morgan	
2016	Operation Avalanche	Yes	Yes	Yes	Co-written with Josh Boles	
2023	BlackBerry	Yes	Yes	No	Co-written with Matthew Miller	
2025	Nirvanna the Band the Show the Movie	Yes	Yes	No	Co-written with Jay McCarrol	
2026	Tony	Yes	Yes	Yes	Co-written with Todd Bartels, Lou Howe and Matthew Miller	
TBA	The Vice Guide †	Yes	TBA	TBA	In production	

==== Acting roles ====
Year	Title	Role	Notes	Ref.
2013	The Dirties	Matt	Fictionalised version of himself	
2015	Diamond Tongues	John Matheson		
2015	How Heavy This Hammer	Hardware Store Employee		
2016	Operation Avalanche	Himself	Fictionalised version of himself	
2018	Spice It Up	Passport Photographer		
2019	Anne at 13,000 Ft.	Matt		
2023	BlackBerry	Doug Fregin		
2024	Matt and Mara	Matt		
2024	The Heirloom	Belligerent Veterinarian		
2025	Nirvanna the Band the Show the Movie	Matt	Fictionalised version of himself	

Executive producer only

- Crash Land (2026)

=== Television ===
Years	Title	Creator	Director	Writer	Producer	Note	Ref.
2017–18	Nirvanna the Band the Show	Yes	Yes	Yes	Executive	Directed and co-wrote all 16 episodes	
2021	Matt & Bird Break Loose	Yes	Yes	Yes	Executive	Co-directed and co-wrote all 3 episodes	
2026	Uncle Stav	No	Yes	No	No	Stavros Halkias comedy special	

==== Acting roles ====
Year	Title	Role	Notes	Ref.
2017–18	Nirvanna the Band the Show	Matt	Fictionalised version of himself	
2021	Matt & Bird Break Loose	Matt (voice)		

=== Web ===
Years	Title	Creator	Director	Writer	Producer	Note	Ref.
2007–09	Nirvana the Band the Show	Yes	Yes	Yes	Yes	Directed and co-wrote all 11 episodes with Jay McCarrol	

==== Acting roles ====
Year	Title	Role	Notes	Ref.
2007–09	Nirvana the Band the Show	Matt	Fictionalised version of himself	

=== Music videos ===
- Alvvays - "Dreams Tonite" (2017)

== Awards and nominations ==
=== Canadian Screen Awards ===
Year	Category	Work	Result	Ref.
2014	Best Editing (with Evan Morgan)	The Dirties	Nominated	
2017	Best Motion Picture (with Matthew Miller and Lee Kim)	Operation Avalanche	Nominated	
2017	Best Director	Operation Avalanche	Nominated	
2024	Best Director	BlackBerry	Won	
2024	Best Adapted Screenplay (with Matthew Miller)	BlackBerry	Won	
2024	Best Supporting Performance in a Comedy Film	BlackBerry	Nominated	
2026	Best Supporting Performance in a Comedy Film	Nirvanna the Band the Show the Movie	Won	
2026	Best Original Song (with Jay McCarrol)	Nirvanna the Band the Show the Movie	Won	

=== Toronto Film Critics Association ===
Year	Category	Work	Result	Ref.
2013	Jay Scott Prize	The Dirties	Won	
2013	Rogers Best Canadian Film Award	The Dirties	Runner-up	
2017	Rogers Best Canadian Film Award	Operation Avalanche	Runner-up	
2024	Rogers Best Canadian Film Award	BlackBerry	Won	
2025	Rogers Best Canadian Film Award	Nirvanna the Band the Show the Movie	Nominated	

=== Vancouver Film Critics Circle ===
Year	Category	Work	Result	Ref.
2019	Best Supporting Actor in a Canadian Film	Anne at 13,000 Ft.	Won	
2023	Best Supporting Actor in a Canadian Film	BlackBerry	Nominated	
2023	Best Screenplay for a Canadian Film (with Matthew Miller)	BlackBerry	Won	
2023	Best Director of a Canadian Film	BlackBerry	Won	
2025	Best Director of a Canadian Film	Nirvanna the Band the Show the Movie	Won	
2025	Best Actor in a Canadian Film	Nirvanna the Band the Show the Movie	Won	
2025	Best Screenplay for a Canadian Film (with Jay McCarrol)	Nirvanna the Band the Show the Movie	Nominated	

=== Other accolades ===
Year	Organizations	Category	Work	Result	Ref.
2013	Slamdance Film Festival	Grand Jury Sparky Award for Feature Narrative	The Dirties	Won	
2013	Slamdance Film Festival	Spirit of Slamdance Sparky Award	The Dirties	Won	
2017	Kingston Canadian Film Festival	People's Choice Award	Operation Avalanche	Won	
2025	Toronto International Film Festival	People's Choice Award: Midnight Madness	Nirvanna the Band the Show the Movie	Won	
2026	Critics' Choice Super Awards	Best Actor in a Science Fiction/Fantasy Movie	Nirvanna the Band the Show the Movie	Nominated	
