= MS Slavic 7 =

- Film Poster
- Directed by: Sofia Bohdanowicz; Deragh Campbell
- Written by: Sofia Bohdanowicz; Deragh Campbell
- Produced by: Sofia Bohdanowicz; Deragh Campbell; Calvin Thomas
- Starring: Deragh Campbell
- Cinematography: Sofia Bohdanowicz
- Edited by: Sofia Bohdanowicz; Deragh Campbell
- Production company: Maison du Bonheur Films Inc.
- Release date: February 12, 2019 (Berlin)
- Running time: 64 minutes
- Country: Canada
- Language: English

MS Slavic 7 is a 2019 Canadian drama film directed by Sofia Bohdanowicz and Deragh Campbell. It stars Campbell as a young woman who discovers a series of letters in a Harvard archive between her great-grandmother and a fellow Polish poet. The film derives its name from the library call number for the box that holds the letters.

It had its world premiere at the 69th Berlin International Film Festival on February 14, 2019, and screened at New Directors/New Films on March 30, 2019.

== Plot ==
After being appointed literary executor, a young woman named Audrey Benac uncovers a series of letters that her great-grandmother had written to a fellow poet. Both displaced from Poland, Zofia Bohdanowiczowa and Nobel Prize nominee Józef Wittlin corresponded from 1957 to 1964 between Toronto, Wales and New York City. Set over the course of three days, Audrey embarks on a journey to Houghton Library at Harvard University to translate and make sense of Zofia's words.

Coming up against her aunt's disapproval as well as complications of access to the material, Audrey struggles to dig into an intimate past while facing her own existentially troubled present. Between silent segments of handling the letters at the archive and discursive monologues that articulate her findings, the film traces the emotional movement through the research process.

== Cast ==
- Deragh Campbell as Audrey Benac
- Aaron Danby as Grzegorz
- Elizabeth Rucker as Anya
- Mariusz Sibiga as Noah

== Production ==
Campbell plays Audrey Benac, a character she has inhabited twice before for Bohdanowicz in the films Never Eat Alone (2016) and Veslemøy's Song (2018).
