= Never Eat Alone =

2016 Canadian drama film

- Film poster
- Directed by: Sofia Bohdanowicz
- Written by: Sofia Bohdanowicz
- Produced by: Calvin Thomas
- Starring: Joan Benac; Deragh Campbell; George Radovics
- Release date: October 2, 2016 (VIFF)
- Running time: 68 minutes
- Country: Canada
- Language: English

Never Eat Alone is a 2016 Canadian drama film written and directed by Sofia Bohdanowicz. The film follows a lonely grandmother as she tries to reconnect with an ex-boyfriend from her youth.

The film premiered in the Future//Present section of the Vancouver International Film Festival on October 2, 2016, where Bohdanowicz won the Emerging Canadian Director award. It also screened at the Buenos Aires International Festival of Independent Cinema as part of a 2017 retrospective of Bohdanowicz's work.

== Cast ==
- Joan Benac as herself
- Deragh Campbell as Audrey Benac
- George Radovics as Don Radovich

== Production ==
Never Eat Alone is an unorthodox documentary-fiction hybrid. Joan Benac, the grandmother character, is played by Joan Benac, Bohdanowicz's grandmother. Don Radovich, the ex-boyfriend character, is played by George Radovics, the film's producer and Bohdanowicz's partner Calvin Thomas' grandfather.

Deragh Campbell plays Audrey Benac, a character she has inhabited twice since for Bohdanowicz in the films Veslemøy's Song (2018) and MS Slavic 7 (2019). She received a Vancouver Film Critics Circle award nomination for Best Actress in a Canadian Film for her performance.
