= Still Single =

- Directed by: Jamal Burger; Jukan Tateisi
- Produced by: Fraser Ash; Kevin Krikst; Julian Nieva
- Starring: Masaki Saito
- Cinematography: Tristan Clarke-McMurchy
- Edited by: Pranay Noel
- Music by: Alex Sowinski
- Production companies: Rhombus Media; Common Good
- Release date: September 5, 2025 (TIFF)
- Running time: 93 minutes
- Country: Canada
- Languages: English; Japanese; Chinese

Still Single is a Canadian documentary film, directed by Jamal Burger and Jukan Tateisi and released in 2025. The film is a profile of Masaki Saito, a Japanese Canadian sushi chef in Toronto who was the first Canadian chef ever to get a two-star rating from the Michelin Guide.

The film premiered at the 2025 Toronto International Film Festival. Its premiere was accompanied by a 60-foot outdoor omakase sushi bar on King Street West during the festival's outdoor Festival Street event.
