= Elevation Pictures =

Canadian film company

Elevation Pictures Corp.
- Type: Private
- Industry: Film distribution, Film production
- Founded: 2013; 13 years ago
- Founder: Laurie May
- Headquarters: 225 Richmond St. W., Toronto, Ontario, Canada
- Key people: Laurie May (Co-President); Noah Segal (Co-President)
- Website: elevationpictures.com

Elevation Pictures is a Canadian independent film distribution and production company. The company was founded in 2013 by Laurie May and is co-led by Noah Segal. The company made its debut at the 2013 Toronto International Film Festival.

== Distribution ==
Since its debut in late 2013, Elevation Pictures has become the leading independent distributor in Canada, releasing both critically acclaimed and commercially successful films. Titles include award-winning films such as The Imitation Game, Moonlight, Room, and Flee, and box office hits such as Hustlers and Paw Patrol: The Movie.

Starting in late 2014, Elevation has had Canadian distribution rights to select films made by Black Bear Pictures, an American independent film company.

In July 2014, Elevation signed a home distribution deal with Universal Pictures Home Entertainment to distribute their titles on Blu-ray and DVD in the majority of Canada, starting with the 2014 film Oculus.

In August 2014, Elevation signed a services deal with Entract Films, which gives Elevation exclusive rights to distribute their films in Quebec.

== Production ==
In 2016, Elevation launched a production arm spearheaded by Noah Segal in partnership with producer Christina Piovesan.

Since then, Elevation Pictures Productions has been actively producing and co-producing original film and TV content. Recent projects include French Exit starring Michelle Pfeiffer and Lucas Hedges, The Nest starring Jude Law, and Alice Darling starring Anna Kendrick.

Elevation has several TV shows currently in development.

== Production titles ==
Film year	Film title	Status
2019	American Woman	
2019	Random Acts of Violence	
2020	The Nest	
2020	French Exit	
2021	The Exchange	
2022	Alice, Darling	
2023	Door Mouse	
2023	Infinity Pool	
2023	A Good Person	
2023	Float	
2024	French Girl	
2026	Paradise	
2026	Tuner	
TBD	Desire of the Prey	Pre-production

== Distribution titles ==
Canadian Release Date	Film title	Genre	Director	Production company
April 11, 2014	Oculus	Horror	Mike Flanagan	Blumhouse Productions, WWE Studios, Intrepid Pictures and FilmDistrict
May 9, 2014	Locke	Drama	Steven Knight	IM Global, Shoebox Films
September 5, 2014	Life After Beth	Comedy, Horror, Romance	Jeff Baena	American Zoetrope, Abbolita Productions, Starstream Entertainment, XYZ Films
October 31, 2014	Young Ones	Action, Drama, Sci-Fi	Jake Paltrow	Bifrost Pictures, Quickfire Films, Spier Films, Subotica Entertainment
October 31, 2014	Nightcrawler	Crime, Drama	Dan Gilroy	Bold Films
December 12, 2014	The Imitation Game	Biography, Drama, Thriller	Morten Tyldum	Black Bear Pictures, Bristol Automotive
January 23, 2015	A Most Violent Year	Action, Crime, Drama	J. C. Chandor	Before the Door Pictures, Washington Square Films, FilmNation Entertainment, Participant Media, Imagenation Abu Dhabi FZ
March 13, 2015	'71	Action, Drama, War	Yann Demange	Crab Apple Films, Warp Films, Film4, BFI Film Fund, Screen Yorkshire, Creative Scotland
March 13, 2015	The Search	Drama	Michel Hazanavicius	La Petite Reine, Worldview Entertainment, La Classe Américaine, Georgian Film Investment Group, Sarke Studio
March 20, 2015	The Gunman	Action, Crime, Drama	Pierre Morel	Nostromo Pictures, Silver Pictures, StudioCanal
April 3, 2015	While We're Young	Comedy, Drama	Noah Baumbach	For A24; IAC Films
April 7, 2015	The Rewrite	Comedy	Marc Lawrence	Castle Rock Entertainment, Reserve Room
April 10, 2015	Danny Collins	Comedy, Drama	Dan Fogelman	For Bleecker Street; Big Indie Pictures, ShivHans Pictures
April 24, 2015	Stay Awhile	Documentary, Drama, Family	Jessica Edwards	BUCK Productions
May 29, 2015	I'll See You in My Dreams	Comedy, Drama	Brett Haley	For Bleecker Street; Jeff Rice Films, Northern Lights Films, Part2 Pictures, Two Flints
July 10, 2015	Big Game	Action, Adventure	Jalmari Helander	Altitude Film Entertainment Ltd, Bavaria Film Partners, Head Gear Films, Subzero Film Entertainment, VisionPlus Fund I
August 5, 2015	Shaun the Sheep Movie	Animation, Comedy	Richard Starzak & Mark Burton	Aardman Animations
August 21, 2015	American Ultra	Action, Comedy	Nima Nourizadeh	PalmStar Entertainment, The Bridge Finance Company, Circle of Confusion, Likely Story, Merced Media Partners, PalmStar Media Capital
September 25, 2015	Pawn Sacrifice	Biography, Crime	Edward Zwick	For Bleecker Street; Gail Katz Productions, MICA Entertainment, Material Pictures, PalmStar Media
October 9, 2015	Hyena Road	Drama, War	Paul Gross	Rhombus Media, Buffalo Gal Pictures, Triple 7 Films, Whizbang Films
October 23, 2015	Room	Drama	Lenny Abrahamson	Film4, Element Pictures
October 30, 2015	Regression	Thriller	Alejandro Amenábar	Mod Producciones, First Generation Films, Himenóptero, Telefónica Studios
December 4, 2015	Legend	Biography, Crime	Brian Helgeland	Anton Capital Entertainment, Cross Creek Pictures, StudioCanal, Working Title Films
February 5, 2016	Mojave	Crime, Thriller	William Monahan	Atlas Independent, Henceforth Pictures, MICA Entertainment, Relativity International
February 19, 2016	The Witch	Horror	Robert Eggers	For A24; Parts and Labor, RT Features, Rooks Nest Entertainment, Code Red Productions, Scythia Films, Maiden Voyage Pictures, Mott Street Pictures, Pulse Films, Special Projects
February 26, 2016	Triple 9	Crime, Drama	John Hillcoat	Worldview Entertainment, Anonymous Content, MadRiver Pictures
February 27, 2016	Fathers and Daughters	Drama	Gabriele Muccino	Andrea Leone Films, Busted Shark Productions, Fear of God Films, Voltage Pictures
March 4, 2016	River	Thriller	Jamie M. Dagg	REDLABdigital, XYZ Films
March 18, 2016	Chi-Raq	Musical, Crime, Black Comedy	Spike Lee	Amazon Studios, 40 Acres and a Mule Filmworks
April 22, 2016	Sing Street	Drama, Musical	John Carney	Cosmo Films, Distressed Films, FilmWave, Likely Story, PalmStar Entertainment
April 29, 2016	Mother's Day	Comedy, Drama	Garry Marshall	Gulfstream Pictures, Capacity Pictures, PalmStar Media
May 13, 2016	A Bigger Splash	Erotic Thriller	Luca Guadagnino	Frenesy Film Company, Cota Film, Ministero per i Beni e le Attività Culturali, Regione Siciliana, Sicilia Film Commission, Sensi Contemporanei Cinema e Audiovisivo, StudioCanal
June 3, 2016	Into the Forest	Drama, Sc-Fi	Patricia Rozema	Rhombus Media, Bron Studios
June 17, 2016	De Palma	Documentary, Biography	Noah Baumbach & Jake Paltrow	For A24; Empire Ward Pictures
June 17, 2016	Genius	Biography, Drama	Michael Grandage	Desert Wolf Productions, Riverstone Pictures, Ingenious, Pinewood Pictures
June 24, 2016	Free State of Jones	Action, Drama	Gary Ross	Bluegrass Films, Larger Than Life Productions, Route One Films, Vendian Entertainment
July 15, 2016	Closet Monster	Drama	Stephen Dunn	Rhombus Media, Best Boy Productions
August 5, 2016	Indignation	Drama, Romance	James Schamus	Bing Feng Bao Entertainment, Likely Story, RT Features, Symbolic Exchange
August 12, 2016	Zoom	Animation, Comedy, Drama	Pedro Morelli	Rhombus Media, O2 Films
August 12, 2016	Anthropoid	Biography, History, Thriller	Sean Ellis	LD Entertainment, 22h22, Lucky Man Films, Z Film Productions
September 16, 2016	Snowden	Biography, Crime	Oliver Stone	Endgame Entertainment, Vendian Entertainment, KrautPack Entertainment
September 16, 2016	The Beatles: Eight Days a Week	Documentary, Music	Ron Howard	Apple Corps, Imagine Entertainment, White Horse Pictures
September 30, 2016	Deepwater Horizon	Disaster, Drama	Peter Berg	Di Bonaventura Pictures, Participant Media
October 7, 2016	Denial	Biography, Drama	Mick Jackson	BBC Films, Participant Media, Shoebox Films
October 14, 2016	American Honey	Adventure, Drama, Romance	For A24; Andrea Arnold	Maven Pictures, Film4
October 21, 2016	Mean Dreams	Thriller	Nathan Morlando	Woods Entertainment
November 4, 2016	Hacksaw Ridge	Biography, Drama, History	Mel Gibson	Cross Creek Pictures
November 11, 2016	Moonlight	Drama	Barry Jenkins	A24, Plan B Entertainment, PASTEL
December 2, 2016	Incarnate	Horror	Brad Peyton	Blumhouse Productions, IM Global, WWE Studios, Deep Underground Films
January 13, 2017	20th Century Women	Comedy, Drama	Mike Mills	A24, Annapurna Pictures
January 20, 2017	The Founder	Biography, Drama, History	John Lee Hancock	FilmNation Entertainment, The Combine
January 27, 2017	Trespass Against Us	Action, Crime, Drama	Adam Smith	For A24; Film4
January 27, 2017	Gold	Crime, Drama	Stephen Gaghan	Black Bear Pictures, Living Films
February 3, 2017	The Salesman	Drama, Thriller	Asghar Farhadi	For Amazon Studios
February 10, 2017	Below Her Mouth	Drama, Romance	April Mullen	The Movie Network
February 24, 2017	The Girl with All the Gifts	Drama, Horror, Sci-Fi	Colm McCarthy	Altitude Film Entertainment, Poison Chef
March 3, 2017	Before I Fall	Drama, Fantasy, Mystery	Ry Russo-Young	Awesomeness Films, Jon Shestack Productions
March 10, 2017	The Last Word	Comedy, Drama	Mark Pellington	For Bleecker Street; Franklin Street, Myriad Pictures, Parkside Pictures, Wondros
March 17, 2017	The Sense of an Ending	Drama, Mystery	Ritesh Batra	Origin Pictures, BBC Films, FilmNation Entertainment
March 31, 2017	The Zookeeper's Wife	Biography, Drama, History	Niki Caro	Scion Films, LD Entertainment
April 7, 2017	Giants of Africa	Documentary, Sport	Hubert Davis	Maple Leaf Sports & Entertainment
April 14, 2017	Their Finest	Comedy, Drama, Romance	Lone Scherfig	BBC Films
April 21, 2017	Free Fire	Action, Comedy, Crime	Ben Wheatley	For A24; Film4, Protagonist Pictures, Rook Films
April 21, 2017	The Lost City of Z	Adventure, Biography, Drama	James Gray	For Amazon Studios; Keep Your Head, MICA Entertainment, MadRiver Pictures, Plan B Entertainment
April 28, 2017	The Circle	Drama, Sci-Fi, Thriller	James Ponsoldt	1978 Films, Imagenation Abu Dhabi FZ, Likely Story, Playtone, Route One Entertainment
May 12, 2017	The Wall	Action, Drama, Thriller	Doug Liman	Amazon Studios, Big Indie Pictures, Picrow
June 8, 2017	Megan Leavey	Biography, Drama, War	Gabriela Cowperthwaite	LD Entertainment, Calle Cruzada
June 10, 2017	Undercover Grandpa	Comedy, Family	Érik Canuel	Corus Entertainment, Vertical Entertainment
June 16, 2017	Beatriz at Dinner	Comedy, Drama	Miguel Arteta	Bron Studios, Killer Films
June 30, 2017	The Big Sick	Comedy, Drama, Romance	Michael Showalter	For Amazon Studios; Apatow Films, FilmNation Entertainment, Story Ink
August 4, 2017	Landline	Comedy, Drama	Gillian Robespierre	For Amazon Studios; OddLot Entertainment, Route One Entertainment
August 18, 2017	Good Time	Crime, Drama, Thriller	Safdie brothers	For A24; Elara Pictures, Rhea Films
September 14, 2017	Long Time Running	Documentary, Music	Jennifer Baichwal and Nicholas de Pencier	Banger Films
September 29, 2017	Woodshock	Drama, Thriller	Kate and Laura Mulleavy	For A24; COTA Films, Waypoint Entertainment
October 13, 2017	The Florida Project	Drama	Sean Baker	For A24; Cre Film, Freestyle Picture Company, June Pictures, Sweet Tomato Films
October 20, 2017	Human Flow	Documentary	Ai Weiwei	For Amazon Studios; 24 Media Production Company, AC Films, Participant Media
October 20, 2017	Breathe	Biography, Drama, Romance	Andy Serkis	For Bleecker Street; Imaginarium Productions
October 27, 2017	Wonderstruck	Drama, Mystery	Todd Haynes	Amazon Studios, Cinetic Media, FilmNation Entertainment, Killer Films, Picrow
October 27, 2017	Suburbicon	Comedy, Crime, Drama	George Clooney	Black Bear Pictures, Dark Castle Entertainment, Huahua Media, Silver Pictures, Smokehouse Pictures
November 3, 2017	The Killing of a Sacred Deer	Drama, Mystery, Thriller	Yorgos Lanthimos	For A24; Element Pictures, Film4
November 10, 2017	Lady Bird	Comedy, Drama	Greta Gerwig	For A24; IAC Films, Scott Rudin Productions, Entertainment 360
November 24, 2017	The Breadwinner	Animation, Drama, Family	Nora Twomey	Aircraft Pictures, Cartoon Saloon, Guru Studio, Jolie Pas
November 24, 2017	The Man Who Invented Christmas	Biography, Comedy, Drama	Bharat Nalluri	For Bleecker Street; Ingenious Media, Nelly Films, Parallel Films, Rhombus Media
December 1, 2017	Sweet Virginia	Drama, Thriller	Jamie M. Dagg	Automatik, Oddfellows Entertainment, XYZ Films
December 1, 2017	The Disaster Artist	Biography, Comedy, Drama	James Franco	For A24; Good Universe, New Line Cinema, Point Grey Pictures, RatPac-Dune Entertainment
January 19, 2018	Hostiles	Adventure, Drama, Western	Scott Cooper	Grisbi Productions, Waypoint Entertainment
January 19, 2018	Forever My Girl	Drama, Music, Romance	Bethany Ashton Wolf	LD Entertainment
January 26, 2018	Hollow in the Land	Drama, Mystery, Thriller	Scooter Corkle	Oddfellows Entertainment, Savath Pictures
February 23, 2018	Every Day	Drama, Fantasy, Romance	Michael Sucsy	Likely Story, FilmWave, Silver Reel, Orion Pictures
March 2, 2018	The Party	Comedy, Drama	Sally Potter	Adventure Pictures, Oxwich Media
March 2, 2018	Nostalgia	Drama	Mark Pellington	
March 9, 2018	The Strangers: Prey at Night	Horror	Johannes Roberts	Fyzz Facility, White Comet Films, Bloom, Rogue Pictures
March 16, 2018	The Death of Stalin	Comedy, Drama, History	Armando Iannucci	Quad Productions, Main Journey, Gaumont, Panache Productions
April 6, 2018	The Miracle Season	Drama, Sport	Sean McNamara	LD Entertainment, Apex Entertainment
April 13, 2018	You Were Never Really Here	Crime, Drama, Mystery	Lynne Ramsay	Why Not Productions, Film4, Page 114
April 13, 2018	Indian Horse	Drama	Stephen Campanelli	Devonshire Productions, Screen Siren Pictures
April 13, 2018	Beirut	Drama, Thriller	Brad Anderson	For Bleecker Street; Radar Pictures, ShivHans Pictures
April 20, 2018	Submergence	Drama, Romance, Thriller	Wim Wenders	Backup Media, Green Hummingbird Entertainment, PalmStar Media
April 27, 2018	Lean on Pete	Adventure, Drama	Andrew Haigh	For A24; The Bureau, Film4
May 25, 2018	On Chesil Beach	Drama, Music, Romance	Dominic Cooke	For Bleecker Street; BBC Films, Number 9 Films
June 8, 2018	Hereditary	Horror	Ari Aster	A24, PalmStar Media, Finch Entertainment, Windy Hill Pictures
June 29, 2018	Uncle Drew	Comedy, Sport	Charles Stone III	Summit Entertainment, Creators League Studio, Pepsi Productions, Temple Hill Entertainment
July 6, 2018	Leave No Trace	Drama	Debra Granik	For Bleecker Street; Bron Studios, Harrison Productions, First Look Media
July 20, 2018	Don't Worry, He Won't Get Far on Foot	Biography, Comedy, Drama	Gus Van Sant	Amazon Studios, Anonymous Content, Big Indie Pictures, Iconoclast
July 20, 2018	Eighth Grade	Comedy, Drama	Bo Burnham	A24, IAC Films
July 27, 2018	Generation Wealth	Documentary	Lauren Greenfield	For Amazon Studios; Evergreen Pictures
July 27, 2018	Our House	Drama, Horror, Thriller	Anthony Scott Burns	Prospero Pictures, Resolute Films and Entertainment, Senator Film Produktion, XYZ Films
August 3, 2018	McQueen	Documentary, Biography	Ian Bonhôte and Peter Ettedgui	For Bleecker Street; Misfits Entertainment, Salon Pictures
August 10, 2018	Dog Days	Comedy, Drama, Romance	Ken Marino	LD Entertainment
August 17, 2018	Juliet, Naked	Comedy, Drama, Music	Jesse Peretz	Rocket Science, Bona Fide Productions, Apatow Productions, Turnlet Films, Ingenious Media
August 24, 2018	Papillon	Adventure, Biography, Crime	Michael Noer	For Bleecker Street; Czech Anglo Productions, FishCorb Films, Red Granite Pictures
September 7, 2018	Peppermint	Action, Drama, Thriller	Pierre Morel	STX Films, Lakeshore Entertainment, Huayi Brothers Media
September 14, 2018	Mandy	Action, Fantasy, Horror	Panos Cosmatos	SpectreVision, Umedia, Legion M, Piccadilly Pictures, XYZ Films
September 21, 2018	Assassination Nation	Action, Comedy, Crime	Sam Levinson	For Neon; Bron Studios, Foxtail Entertainment
September 28, 2018	Colette	Biography, Drama, History	Wash Westmoreland	For Bleecker Street; Number 9 Films, Killer Films, Bold Films, Pioneer Striking Films
October 5, 2018	The Sisters Brothers	Adventure, Comedy, Crime	Jacques Audiard	Why Not Productions, Page 114, Apache Films
October 5, 2018	Matangi/Maya/M.I.A.	Documentary, Biography, Music	Steve Loveridge	Cinereach, Hard Working Movies, Doc Society, Feature One
October 19, 2018	The New Romantic	Comedy, Drama, Romance	Carly Stone	Drive Films, Independent Edge Films, JoBro Productions & Film Finance
October 26, 2018	What They Had	Drama	Elizabeth Chomko	For Bleecker Street; Unified Pictures, Bona Fide Productions, Look to the Sky Films
November 23, 2018	At Eternity's Gate	Biography, Drama	Julian Schnabel	Riverstone Pictures, Iconoclast
December 2, 2018	Elliot the Littlest Reindeer	Animation, Family	Jennifer Westcott	Awesometown Entertainment, Double Dutch International, Elgin Road Productions
December 14, 2018	Ben Is Back	Drama	Peter Hedges	Black Bear Pictures, 30West, Color Force
December 21, 2018	Vox Lux	Drama, Music	Brady Corbet	Bold Films, Killer Films, Andrew Lauren Productions
December 21, 2018	Second Act	Comedy, Drama, Romance	Peter Segal	STX Entertainment
January 11, 2019	The Upside	Comedy, Drama	Neil Burger	Lantern Entertainment
January 11, 2019	Destroyer	Action, Crime, Drama	Karyn Kusama	30West, Automatik Entertainment
January 25, 2019	Serenity	Drama, Thriller	Steven Knight	Global Road Entertainment, IM Global, Shoebox Films, Starlings Entertainment
February 8, 2019	Arctic	Drama	Joe Penna	For Bleecker Street; Armory Films, Pegasus Pictures, Union Entertainment Group
February 8, 2019	Cold Pursuit	Action, Drama, Thriller	Hans Petter Moland	Paradox Films, StudioCanal
March 1, 2019	Apollo 11	Documentary, History	Todd Douglas Miller	For Neon; CNN Films, Statement Pictures
March 1, 2019	A Madea Family Funeral	Comedy	Tyler Perry	Tyler Perry Studios
March 22, 2019	The Hummingbird Project	Drama, Thriller	Kim Nguyen	Item 7, Belga Productions
April 12, 2019	Missing Link	Animation, Adventure, Comedy	Chris Butler	Laika
April 12, 2019	Amazing Grace	Documentary, Music	Alan Elliott and Sydney Pollack	For Neon; 40 Acres and a Mule Filmworks, Al's Records and Tapes, Sundial Pictures
April 12, 2019	The Best of Enemies	Biography, Drama, History	Robin Bissell	For STXfilms; Astute Films, Material Pictures
April 12, 2019	Mary Magdalene	Drama	Garth Davis	See-Saw Films, Porchlight Films, Film4
April 19, 2019	High Life	Horror, Science-Fiction	Claire Denis	For A24; Alcatraz Films, Pandora Filmproduktion, Andrew Lauren Productions, Apocalypse Films, Arte, ZDF, Canal+, Ciné+
April 19, 2019	Teen Spirit	Drama, Music	Max Minghella	Automatik Entertainment, Blank Tape, Interscope Films
May 17, 2019	The Biggest Little Farm	Documentary	John Chester	FarmLore Films
June 21, 2019	Child's Play	Horror	Lars Klevberg	Bron Studios, Orion Pictures
July 3, 2019	Midsommar	Drama, Horror, Mystery	Ari Aster	For A24; B-Reel Films, Square Peg
July 12, 2019	Marianne & Leonard: Words of Love	Documentary, Music	Nick Broomfield	
August 9, 2019	Luce	Drama	Julius Onah	For Neon; Dream Factory Group, Altona Filmhaus
August 9, 2019	Light of My Life	Drama	Casey Affleck	Black Bear Pictures, Sea Change Media
August 20, 2019	The Biggest Little Farm	Documentary	John Chester	For Neon; LD Entertainment, Impact Partners, FarmLore Films, Artemis Rising Foundation
August 30, 2019	Brittany Runs a Marathon	Comedy, Drama	Paul Downs Colaizzo	For Amazon Studios; Material Pictures, Picture Films
September 13, 2019	Hustlers	Comedy, Crime, Drama	Lorene Scafaria	Annapurna Pictures, Gloria Sanchez Productions, STX Films
September 19, 2019	Random Acts of Violence	Horror	Jay Baruchel	SND Films, Shudder
September 27, 2019	Monos	Thriller	Alejandro Landes	For Neon
October 15, 2019	Countdown	Horror	Justin Dec	For STXfilms; Boies / Schiller Film Group, Two Grown Men, Wrigley Pictures
November 8, 2019	Midway	Action, Drama, History	Roland Emmerich	Centropolis Entertainment, RuYi Media, Starlight Culture Entertainment Group, Street Entertainment, The Mark Gordon Company
November 15, 2019	Waves	Drama	Trey Edward Shults	A24, Guy Grand Productions, JW Films
December 6, 2019	Playmobil: The Movie	Animation, Adventure, Comedy	Lino DiSalvo	ON Animation Studios
December 13, 2019	Code 8	Sci-Fi	Jeff Chan	Colony Pictures, XYZ Films, Telefilm Canada
December 25, 2019	The Song of Names	Drama	François Girard	Serendipity Point Films, No Sugar Films
February 21, 2020	Brahms: The Boy II	Horror	William Brent Bell	Lakeshore Entertainment, STX Films
February 28, 2020	Disappearance at Clifton Hill	Drama, Mystery, Thriller	Albert Shin	Rhombus Media
March 6, 2020	Run This Town	Biography, Drama	Ricky Tollman	CounterNarrative Films, JoBro Productions & Film Finance, Manis Film
March 27, 2020	Blood Quantum	Horror	Jeff Barnaby	Prospector Films
May 8, 2020	Spaceship Earth	Documentary	Matt Wolff	For Neon; RadicalMedia
May 22, 2020	The Painter and the Thief	Documentary	Benjamin Ree	For Neon; Medieoperatørene, VGTV, Tremolo Productions and Norwegian Film Institute
June 5, 2020	Becky	Action, Thriller	Cary Murnion and Jonathan Millott	Yale Productions, BoulderLight Pictures
June 30, 2020	American Woman	Drama	Semi Chellas	AW Canada Films, Killer Films
July 10, 2020	Guest of Honour	Drama	Atom Egoyan	Ego Film Arts, The Film Farm
August 14, 2020	Fatima	Drama	Marco Pontecorvo	Origin Entertainment, Rose Pictures, Panorama Films
September 11, 2020	The Broken Hearts Gallery	Romantic Comedy	Natalie Krinsky	July Moon Productions, Kicked to the Curb Productions, No Trace Camping
October 2, 2020	Possessor	Sci-Fi, Thriller	Brandon Cronenberg	Telefilm Canada, Rook Films, Arclight Films, Leeding Media
November 13, 2020	Ammonite	Drama	Francis Lee	For Neon; BBC Films, BFI, See-Saw Films, Cross City Films
January 22, 2021	The Friend	Drama	Gabriela Cowperthwaite	Black Bear Pictures, Scott Free Productions
January 29, 2021	Saint Maud	Horror	Rose Glass	For A24; Escape Plan Productions, Film4 Productions, British Film Institute
February 12, 2021	French Exit	Comedy, Drama	Azazel Jacobs	Evolution Entertainment, Screen Siren Pictures, Telefilm Canada, Blinder Films, Terminal City Pictures, Saalgo Productions
March 19, 2021	The Courier	Drama	Dominic Cooke	FilmNation Entertainment, SunnyMarch
April 22, 2021	Stowaway	Sci-Fi, Thriller	Joe Penna	XYZ Films, Rise Pictures
April 22, 2021	Gunda	Documentary	Viktor Kossakovsky	For Neon; Louverture Films, Artemis Rising Foundation, Fritt Ord, Norwegian Film Institute, Sant & Usant, Storyline
May 28, 2021	New Order	Thriller	Michel Franco	For Neon; Teorema Films, Les Films d'Ici
July 16, 2021	Pig	Drama	Michael Sarnoski	AI Film, Endeavor Content, Pulse Films, BlockBox Entertainment, Valparaiso Pictures, Saturn Films
July 30, 2021	The Green Knight	Fantasy	David Lowery	A24, Ley Line Entertainment, Bron Studios, Sailor Bear
August 20, 2021	Paw Patrol: The Movie	Animation, Action, Adventure, Comedy, Family	Cal Brunker	Paramount Pictures, Nickelodeon Movies, Spin Master Entertainment, Mikros Image
September 17, 2021	Copshop	Action, Thriller	Joe Carnahan	Sculptor Media, Zero Gravity Management, G-BASE, WarParty Films
October 1, 2021	Titane	Horror, Drama	Julia Ducournau	For Neon; Arte France Cinema, VOO, BeTV, Kazak Productions, Frakas Productions
November 5, 2021	Spencer	Biography, Drama	Pablo Larraín	FilmNation Entertainment, Komplizen Film, Fabula, Shoebox Films
November 24, 2021	Resident Evil: Welcome to Raccoon City	Horror, Action	Johannes Roberts	Screen Gems, Constantin Film, Davis Films, The Fyzz Facility, The Tea Shop and Film Company
December 2, 2021	Flee	Documentary	Jonas Poher Rasmussen	For Neon; Final Cut for Real, Vice Studios, Left Handed Films, RYOT Films, Fritt Ord, SVT, Arte, Swedish Film Institute, Danish Film Institute, Norwegian Film Institute, Sun Creature Studio, CNC, Creative Europe, Movistar Plus+
February 18, 2022	Dog	Comedy, Drama	Channing Tatum, Reid Carolin	For Metro-Goldwyn-Mayer; FilmNation Entertainment, Free Association
March 11, 2022	After Yang	Sci-Fi, Drama	Kogonada	A24, Cinereach, Per Capita Productions
March 25, 2022	Everything Everywhere All at Once	Absurdist, Comedy, Drama	Dan Kwan, Daniel Scheinert	A24, Gozie AGBO, Ley Line Entertainment, IAC Films, Year of the Rat
April 1, 2022	The Contractor	Action, Thriller	Tarik Saleh	STXfilms, Thunder Road Films, 30West
April 29, 2022	Memory	Action, Thriller	Martin Campbell	Black Bear Pictures, Welle Entertainment, Saville Productions
May 20, 2022	Memoria	Drama	Apichatpong Weerasethakul	For Neon
June 24, 2022	Marcel the Shell with Shoes on	Mockumentary, Comedy, Drama	Dean Fleischer Camp	For A24; Cinereach
August 26, 2022	Three Thousand Years of Longing	Fantasy, Romance, Drama	George Miller	For Metro-Goldwyn-Mayer; FilmNation Entertainment, Elevate Production Finance, Sunac Culture, Kennedy Miller Mitchell
September 16, 2022	Moonage Daydream	Documentary	Brett Morgen	For Neon; BMG, Public Road Productions, Live Nation Entertainment, HBO Documentary Films
October 7, 2022	Triangle of Sadness	Black Comedy	Ruben Östlund	For Neon; Imperative Entertainment, Film i Väst, BBC Film, 30West
December 5, 2022	Tiger 24: The Making of a Man-Eater	Documentary	Warren Pereira	W Films LLC, The Tiger Fund LLC
December 9, 2022	The Whale	Psychological Drama	Darren Aronofsky	A24, Protozoa Pictures
December 26, 2022	Broker	Drama	Hirokazu Kore-eda	For Neon; CJ Entertainment, Zip Cinema
January 13, 2023	Door Mouse	Thriller	Avan Jogia	Highland Film Group, Drive Films, Goldrush Entertainment, Independent Edge Films, Telefilm Canada
February 24, 2023	The Quiet Girl	Drama	Colm Bairéad	For Super LTD; Inscéal, Screen Ireland, TG4, Broadcasting Authority of Ireland
March 3, 2023	Operation Fortune: Ruse de Guerre	Spy, Action, Comedy	Guy Ritchie	STXfilms, Miramax, AZ Celtic Films, Toff Guy Films
March 31, 2023	Enys Men	Horror	Mark Jenkin	For Neon; BFI, Film4 Productions
April 7, 2023	How to Blow Up a Pipeline	Thriller	Daniel Goldhaber	For Neon; Lyrical Media, Chrono, Spacemaker Productions
April 21, 2023	To Catch a Killer	Crime, Thriller	Damián Szifron	FilmNation Entertainment, RainMaker Films
May 12, 2023	BlackBerry	Biographical, Comedy, Drama	Matt Johnson	XYZ Films, Rhombus Media, Zapruder Films
May 12, 2023	Hypnotic	Mystery, Action, Thriller	Robert Rodriguez	For Ketchup Entertainment; Solstice Studios, Ingenious Media, Studio 8, Double R Productions
May 26, 2023	You Hurt My Feelings	Comedy, Drama	Nicole Holofcener	For A24; FilmNation Entertainment, Likely Story
June 2, 2023	Past Lives	Romantic, Drama	Celine Song	A24, CJ ENM, Killer Films, 2AM
June 2, 2023	Bones of Crows	Drama	Marie Clements	Bron Studios, Ayasew Ooskana Pictures, Marie Clements Media, Screen Siren Pictures, Grana Productions
August 25, 2023	Golda	Biography, Drama	Guy Nattiv	For Bleecker Street; Piccadilly Pictures, Big Entrance, Embankment Films, Lipsync Productions, Qwerty Films
September 8, 2023	My Big Fat Greek Wedding 3	Romantic Comedy	Nia Vardalos	Focus Features, Playtone, Gold Circle Films, HBO Films
September 22, 2023	Dumb Money	Biography, Comedy, Drama	Craig Gillespie	Black Bear Pictures
September 22, 2023	It Lives Inside	Horror	Bishal Dutta	Neon, QC Entertainment, Brightlight Pictures
September 29, 2023	Paw Patrol: The Mighty Movie	Animation, Action, Adventure, Comedy, Family, Superhero	Cal Brunker	Paramount Pictures, Nickelodeon Movies, Spin Master Entertainment, Mikros Image
December 15, 2023	The Zone of Interest	Historical, Drama	Jonathan Glazer	A24, Film4 Productions, Access Entertainment, Polish Film Institute, JW Films, Extreme Emotions
December 22, 2023	The Iron Claw	Biography, Sports, Drama	Sean Durkin	A24, Access Entertainment, BBC Film, House Productions
December 25, 2023	Ferrari	Biography, Sports, Thriller	Michael Mann	STXfilms, Moto Productions, Forward Pass, Ketchup Entertainment, Le Grisbi, Iervolino & Lady Bacardi Entertainment
March 22, 2024	Immaculate	Horror	Michael Mohan	Black Bear Pictures, Fifty-Fifty Films, Middle Child Pictures
April 5, 2024	La chimera	Drama	Alice Rohrwacher	For Neon; Rai Cinema, Ad Vitam, Arte France Cinema, Radiotelevisione svizzera, Tempesta, Amka Films
April 12, 2024	Civil War	Dystopian, Action	Alex Garland	A24, DNA Films, IPR.VC
April 26, 2024	Humane	Horror, Thriller	Caitlin Cronenberg	XYZ Films, Victory Man Productions, Frakas Production
May 17, 2024	Babes	Comedy	Pamela Adlon	For Neon; FilmNation Entertainment, Range Media Partners, Starrpix
May 31, 2024	Handling the Undead	Horror, Drama	Thea Hvistendahl	For Neon; Zentropa, Film i Väst, Nordisk Film & TV Fond, Norwegian Film Institute, Swedish Film Institute, Einar Film
May 31, 2024	Robot Dreams	Animation, Comedy, Drama	Pablo Berger	For Neon; Arcadia Motion Pictures, Noodles Production, Les Film du Worso, RTVE, Movistar Plus+
June 14, 2024	Firebrand	Biography, Drama	Karim Aïnouz	MBK Production, FilmNation Entertainment, Brouhaha Entertainment, Magnolia Mae Films
July 12, 2024	Longlegs	Horror, Thriller	Oz Perkins	For Neon; C2 Motion Picture Group, Traffic., Range Media Partners, Oddfellows Entertainment, Saturn Films
July 12, 2024	Sing Sing	Drama	Greg Kwedar	Black Bear Pictures, Marfa Peach Company, Edith Productions
August 8, 2024	Balestra	Sci-Fi, Drama, Sports	Nicole Dorsey	Entract Films, Regency Enterprises, QCode, Automatik, Item 7, Oddfellows Entertainment
August 9, 2024	Cuckoo	Sci-Fi, Horror	Tilman Singer	Neon, Fiction Park, Waypoint Entertainment
August 23, 2024	The Crow	Superhero, Supernatural, Action, Horror	Rupert Sanders	For Lionsgate; FilmNation Entertainment, Hassell Free Productions, Electric Shadow Co., Davis Films, Pressman Film, Ashland Hill Media Finance, 30West, Highland Film Group
September 6, 2024	The Front Room	Horror, Thriller	The Eggers Brothers	A24, Two & Two Pictures, 2AM
September 27, 2024	Lee	Biography, Drama, War	Ellen Kuras	Brouhaha Entertainment, Juggle Films
October 18, 2024	Anora	Comedy, Drama	Sean Baker	For Neon; FilmNation Entertainment, Cre Film
October 18, 2024	Goodrich	Comedy, Drama	Hallie Meyers-Shyer	Black Bear Pictures, C2 Motion Picture Group, Stay Gold Features
October 18, 2024	Rumours	Black Comedy	Guy Maddin, Evan Johnson, Galen Johnson	Square Peg, Buffalo Gal Pictures, Maze Pictures
October 25, 2024	Conclave	Mystery, Thriller	Edward Berger	FilmNation Entertainment, Indian Paintbrush and House Productions
December 13, 2024	The End	Apocalyptic, Musical	Joshua Oppenheimer	Neon, The Match Factory/Mubi, Final Cut for Real, The End MFP, Wild Atlantic Pictures, Dorje Film, Moonspun Films, Anagram
December 20, 2024	The Brutalist	Epic, Historical, Drama	Brady Corbet	For A24; Brookstreet Pictures, Kaplan Morrison
December 25, 2024	Babygirl	Erotic, Thriller	Halina Reijn	A24, 2AM, Man Up Films
January 17, 2025	The Seed of the Sacred Fig	Political, Thriller, Drama	Mohammad Rasoulof	For Neon; Run Way Pictures, Parallel45, Arte France Cinéma
January 17, 2025	Presence	Psychological, Thriller, Horror	Steven Soderbergh	For Neon; Sugar23, Extension 765
February 21, 2025	The Monkey	Supernatural, Comedy, Horror	Oz Perkins	Black Bear Pictures, C2 Motion Picture Group, Atomic Monster, The Safran Company, Stars Collective Films, Range Media Partners, Oddfellows Entertainment
February 28, 2025	Last Breath	Survival, Thriller	Alex Parkinson	FilmNation Entertainment, Longshot Films, Dark Castle Entertainment, Early Bird Productions, Aperture
March 7, 2025	Night of the Zoopocalypse	Animation, Comedy, Horror	Rodrigo Perez-Castro, Ricardo Curtis	Anton, Charades, Copperheart Entertainment, Umedia, Apollo Films, Crave, House of Cool, Mac Guff, Telefilm Canada
March 7, 2025	Seven Veils	Drama, Thriller	Atom Egoyan	Rhombus Media, Ego Film Arts, XYZ Films
March 14, 2025	The Actor	Crime, Mystery	Duke Johnson	For Neon; Innerlight Films, Underscore Films, Waypoint Entertainment
March 21, 2025	Locked	Psychological, Thriller, Horror	David Yarovesky	north.five.six, ZQ Entertainment, R.U. Robot Studios, Arcana Studio, Raimi Productions, Sillen Productions, Exemplary Films, Magic Button Films, Blue Rider Media, Longevity Pictures
April 18, 2025	The Legend of Ochi	Fantasy, Adventure	Isaiah Saxon	A24, AGBO, Encyclopedia Pictura, Neighborhood Watch, Year of the Rat, IPR.VC, Access Entertainment
May 2, 2025	Bonjour Tristesse	Drama	Durga Chew-Bose	Babe Nation Films, Barry Films, Cinenovo, MIPA Management
May 9, 2025	Clown in a Cornfield	Slasher, Horror, Comedy	Eli Craig	Hercules Film Fund, Protagonist Pictures, Temple Hill Entertainment, Rhea Films
May 30, 2025	Bring Her Back	Horror	Danny and Michael Philippou	A24, Causeway Films
June 6, 2025	The Life of Chuck	Fantasy, Drama	Mike Flanagan	For Neon; Intrepid Pictures, FilmNation Entertainment, QWGmire, Red Room Pictures
June 6, 2025	Dangerous Animals	Survival, Horror	Sean Byrne	For Mister Smith Entertainment; LD Entertainment, Brouhaha Entertainment, Range Media Partners, Oddfellows Entertainment
July 30, 2025	Together	Supernatural, Horror	Michael Shanks	For Neon; Picturestart, Tango Entertainment, 30West, 1.21, Princess Pictures
August 8, 2025	Shook	Drama	Amar Wala	Film Forge, Scarborough Pictures
August 22, 2025	Splitsville	Comedy	Michael Angelo Covino	Neon, Topic Studios, Watch This Ready, TeaTime Pictures
August 22, 2025	Relay	Thriller	David Mackenzie	Black Bear Pictures, Thunder Road Films, Sigma Films
October 3, 2025	Orwell: 2+2=5	Documentary	Raoul Peck	Neon, Velvet Film, Jigsaw Productions, Anonymous Content, Closer Media, Universal Pictures Content Group, Participant
October 24, 2025	Shelby Oaks	Supernatural, Horror, Mystery	Chris Stuckmann	For Neon; Paper Street Pictures, Intrepid Pictures
October 24, 2025	It Was Just an Accident	Thriller	Jafar Panahi	For Neon; Jafar Panahi Productions, Les Films Pelléas, Bidibul Productions, Pio & Co, Arte France Cinema
November 7, 2025	Christy	Biography, Sports, Drama	David Michôd	Black Bear Pictures, Anonymous Content, Votiv Films, Yoki, Inc., Fifty-Fifty Films
November 14, 2025	Keeper	Horror	Oz Perkins	Neon, Oddfellows Entertainment
November 14, 2025	Sentimental Value	Comedy, Drama	Joachim Trier	For Neon; Mer Film, Eye Eye Pictures, MK Productions, BBC Film, Lumen Production, Komplizen Film, Zentropa, Zentropa Sweden, Film i Väst, Alaz Film
December 5, 2025	The Secret Agent	Political, Thriller	Kleber Mendonça Filho	For Neon; CinemaScópio, MK Productions, Arte France Cinema, Black Rabbit Media, Itapoan, Vitrine Filmes, mk2 Films, Lemming Film
December 25, 2025	Marty Supreme	Sports, Comedy, Drama	Josh Safdie	A24, Central Group
December 25, 2025	No Other Choice	Black Comedy, Thriller	Park Chan-wook	For Neon; CJ Entertainment, Moho Film
January 9, 2026	The Mother and the Bear	Comedy, Drama	Johnny Ma	Rhombus Media, Fábula, Thin Stuff Productions
January 30, 2026	Shelter	Action, Thriller	Ric Roman Waugh	Black Bear Pictures, Punch Palace Productions, Cinemacine, Stampede Ventures
January 30, 2026	Arco	Animation, Sci-Fi, Fantasy	Ugo Bienvenu	For Neon; Fit Via Vi Film Productions, MountainA, Remembers
February 6, 2026	Whistle	Horror	Corin Hardy	For Black Bear Pictures; No Trace Camping, Wild Atlantic Pictures
February 13, 2026	Honey Bunch	Thriller	Madeleine Sims-Fewer, Dusty Mancinelli	Cat People Films, Rhombus Media, XYZ Films, Telefilm Canada
February 13, 2026	Nirvanna the Band the Show the Movie	Mockumentary, Adventure	Matt Johnson	Telefilm Canada
February 20, 2026	EPiC: Elvis Presley in Concert	Documentary	Baz Luhrmann	For Neon; Sony Music, Bazmark Films, Authentic Studios
March 13, 2026	Alpha	Body Horror	Julia Ducournau	For Neon; FilmNation Entertainment, Charades, Petit Film, Mandarin & Compagnie, France 3 Cinema, Frakas Productions
April 10, 2026	Exit 8	Mystery, Psychological, Horror	Genki Kawamura	For Neon; Story Inc., AOI Pro.
April 10, 2026	The Christophers	Black Comedy	Steven Soderbergh	For Neon; Department M, Butler & Sklar Productions
April 17, 2026	Mile End Kicks	Romance, Comedy	Chandler Levack	Banner House Productions, Zapruder Films, XYZ Films, Rhombus Media
May 1, 2026	Hokum	Supernatural, Horror	Damian McCarthy	For Neon; Image Nation Abu Dhabi, Team Thrives, Spooky Pictures, Tailored Films, Cweature Features
May 15, 2026	In the Grey	Action, Thriller	Guy Ritchie	For Black Bear Pictures; C2, Toff Guy Films
May 22, 2026	I Love Boosters	Crime, Comedy	Boots Riley	Neon, Ryder Picture Company, Annapurna Pictures, Waypoint Entertainment, Savage Rose Films
May 22, 2026	Tuner	Crime, Thriller	Daniel Roher	Black Bear Pictures, English Breakfast Productions
May 29, 2026	Backrooms	Sci-Fi, Supernatural, Psychological, Horror	Kane Parsons	A24, North Road Films, 21 Laps Entertainment, Atomic Monster, Chernin Entertainment, Phobos
June 19, 2026	Leviticus	Horror	Adrian Chiarella	For Neon; Causeway Films, Salmira Productions
June 19, 2026	The Death of Robin Hood	Thriller, Action, Adventure, Drama	Michael Sarnoski	For A24; Lyrical Media, RPC
June 26, 2026	Blood Lines	Romance, Drama	Gail Maurice	Assini Productions, Devonshire Productions, Night Market
July 17, 2026	Steal Away	Drama	Clement Virgo	Conquering Lion Pictures, Potemkino
July 24, 2026	Her Private Hell	Sci-Fi, Thriller	Nicolas Winding Refn	Neon, byNWR
July 31, 2026	I Want Your Sex	Erotic, Comedy, Thriller	Gregg Araki	Black Bear Pictures
July 31, 2026	Sheep in the Box	Sci-Fi, Drama	Hirokazu Kore-eda	For Neon; Fuji Television, Gaga Corporation, Toho, Aoi Pro.
August 7, 2026	Ice Cream Man	Horror	Eli Roth	Iconic Events, MCT Studios, The Horror Section
August 14, 2026	Paw Patrol: The Dino Movie	Animation, Action, Adventure, Comedy, Family	Cal Brunker	Paramount Pictures, Paramount Animation, Nickelodeon Movies, Spin Master Entertainment
August 14, 2026	The Rivals of Amziah King	Crime, Thriller	Andrew Patterson	Black Bear Pictures, Heyday Films
August 14, 2026	The Wrong Girls	Comedy	Dylan Meyer	Neon, Point Grey Pictures, Nevermind Pictures, Savage Rose Films, Curious Gremlin
August 21, 2026	Spa Weekend	Comedy	Jon Lucas and Scott Moore	Black Bear Pictures, Team Todd
August 28, 2026	It Ends	Horror, Thriller	Alexander Ullom	For Neon; Snoot Entertainment, Growing Up Dead Films, Above .330, Aymara Films, Please Hold Pictures, Oddfellows
September 9, 2026	Hope	Epic, Sci-Fi, Action, Thriller	Na Hong-jin	For Neon; Plus M Entertainment, Forged Films
September 25, 2026	Primetime	Crime, Thriller	Lance Oppenheim	A24, Range Media Partners, Icki Eneo Arlo, Square Peg
October 9, 2026	Fjord	Drama	Cristian Mungiu	For Neon; Mobra Films, Why Not Productions, Eye Eye Pictures, Snowglobe Film, Aamu Film Company, Filmgate Films
October 30, 2026	Wicker	Fantasy, Romance	Alex Huston Fischer, Eleanor Wilson	For Black Bear Pictures; Tango Entertainment, South of the River Pictures, Topic Studios, Yoki Inc., Votiv
November 13, 2026	Club Kid	Comedy, Drama	Jordan Firstman	For A24; Topic Studios, Stay Gold Features
November 13, 2026	I Play Rocky	Biography, Drama	Peter Farrelly	FilmNation Entertainment, Baha Productions, Eden Rock Media, Fireside Films
November 20, 2026	Paper Tiger	Crime, Drama	James Gray	For Neon; Leone Film Group, RT Features, Keep Your Head Productions
December 4, 2026	Flavia: Girl Detective	Family, Adventure	Bharat Nalluri	The Mazur Kaplan Company, Mystic Point Productions, Zephyr Films, Pigasus Pictures, Sky Original Films
December 11, 2026	All of a Sudden	Drama	Ryusuke Hamaguchi	For Neon; Cinefrance Studios, Office Shirouz, Bitters End, Heimatfilm, Tarantula
December 11, 2026	George Michael: The Faith Tour	Documentary	Andy Morahan and David Austin	Mercury Studios, George Michael Entertainment
December 18, 2026	The Debut	Musical, Comedy	Jesse Eisenberg	For A24; Topic Studios, Fruit Tree
January 1, 2027	Pendulum	Horror, Mystery	Mark Heyman	C2 Motion Picture Group, Motel Mojave, Protozoa Pictures
January 8, 2027	Artificial	Biography, Comedy, Drama	Luca Guadagnino	For Neon; Heyday Films
January 22, 2027	Air Bud Returns	Sports, Comedy, Drama	Robert Vince	Air Bud Entertainment
February 19, 2027	Wife & Dog	Thriller	Guy Ritchie	For Black Bear Pictures; Toff Guy Films
2027	Paradise	Drama	Jérémy Comte	Entract Films, EMAFilms, Constellation Productions
2027	The Young People	Horror	Oz Perkins	Neon, Phobos, Range Media Partners
2027	Julián	Animation, Fantasy, Drama	Louise Bagnall, Guillaume Lorin, Mark Mullery	Cartoon Saloon, Melusine Productions, Guru Studio, Aircraft Pictures
2027	Cliffhanger	Action, Thriller	Jaume Collet-Serra	Original Film, Supernix, Thank You Pictures, Rocket Science
TBA	Bad Lieutenant: Tokyo	Action, Thriller	Takashi Miike	For Neon; Nippon TV, Pressman Film, Recorded Picture Company, OLM, TF1 Films
TBA	Sacrifice	Action, Adventure, Comedy	Romain Gavras	For Rocket Science; Iconoclast, Mid March Media, Film4 Productions, Heretic Films
TBA	Clarissa	Drama	Arie Esiri and Chuko Esiri	For Neon; Per Capita Productions, Invention Studios
TBA	Kockroach	Crime, Thriller	Matt Ross	Black Bear Pictures, Mad Chance Productions
TBA	The Unknown	Thriller	Arthur Harari	For Neon; Bathysphère, To Be Continued, Pathé, France 2 Cinéma, Logical Content Ventures, Ascent Film, Rai Cinema

=== Distribution titles ===
Year	Series Title	Genre	Creator	Network	Production company
2013	Paw Patrol	Animation, Comedy, Family	Keith Chapman	TVOKids (Canada); Nickelodeon (U.S.)	Nickelodeon Animation Studio, Spin Master Entertainment, Guru Studio
2015	Between	Drama, Sci-Fi	Michael McGowan	City/Shomi (Canada); Netflix (International)	Don Carmody Television, Mulmur Feed Company, Elevation Pictures
2022	Shoresy	Comedy, Sitcom	Jared Keeso	Crave (Canada)	New Metric Media, Bell Media, WildBrain Studios, Play Fun Games Pictures
2023	Rubble & Crew	Animation, Comedy, Family	Bradley Zweig	Treehouse TV (Canada); Nickelodeon (U.S.)	Nickelodeon Animation Studio, Spin Master Entertainment
TBA	John Carpenter Presents	Horror, Anthology	Michael Amo and Will Pascoe	TBA	TBA
