= Zoom (2015 film) =

2015 film by Pedro Morelli

- Theatrical release poster
- Directed by: Pedro Morelli
- Written by: Matthew Hansen
- Story by: Pedro Morelli
- Produced by: Niv Fichman; Andrea Barata Ribeiro
- Starring: Gael García Bernal; Alison Pill; Mariana Ximenes; Tyler Labine; Don McKellar; Jennifer Irwin; Michael Eklund; Cláudia Ohana; Clé Bennett; Rick Roberts; Jason Priestley
- Cinematography: Adrian Teijido
- Edited by: Lucas Gonzaga
- Music by: Kid Koala
- Production companies: Rhombus Media; O2 Filmes
- Distributed by: Elevation Pictures (Canada); Paris Filmes (Brazil)
- Release dates: 11 September 2015 (TIFF); 31 March 2016 (Brazil); 12 August 2016 (Canada)
- Running time: 97 minutes
- Countries: Canada; Brazil
- Languages: English; Portuguese

Zoom is a 2015 live-action/animated comedy-drama film directed by Pedro Morelli and starring Gael García Bernal, Alison Pill, and Mariana Ximenes. It premiered at the 2015 Toronto International Film Festival.

== Plot ==
The film is a multi-dimensional interface between comic book artist Emma Boyles (drawing Deacon's reality), novelist Michelle (writing Boyles' reality), and film director Edward Deacon (filming Michelle's reality). Each lives in a separate reality but authors a story about one of the others.

Emma, working at a sex doll factory in Toronto, fantasizes about having larger breasts and undergoes augmentation surgery, only to regret her choice. When Michelle's novel plotting starts to become more implausible Emma and her friend Bob get drawn into a complicated world of drug deals and shootouts.

Edward is a successful action movie director who wants to make arthouse films and has been relying on his sexual prowess to get what he wants. When Emma's frustration with her lack of control over her own body leads her to radically reduce the size of Edward's penis in her comic book he starts to lose control over his movie and becomes subject to studio interference.

Michelle is a successful model trying to establish herself as a novelist. When Edward's movie about her starts to turn into a typical Hollywood blockbuster her ability to write is affected and her attempts to resolve Emma's story start to become increasingly wildly improbable.

== Cast ==
- Gael García Bernal as Edward Deacon
- Alison Pill as Emma Boyles
- Mariana Ximenes as Michelle
- Tyler Labine as Bob
- Don McKellar as Horowitz
- Jennifer Irwin as Marissa
- Michael Eklund as moustache guy
- Cláudia Ohana as Alice
- Clé Bennett as Carl Stromway
- Rick Roberts as plastic surgeon
- Jason Priestley as Dale

== Awards and nominations ==
Year	Festival	Category	Result
2015	Ithaca International Fantastic Film Festival	Best Film	Won
2016	Canadian Screen Awards	Original Screenplay	Nominated
2016	Canadian Screen Awards	Achievement in Visual Effects	Nominated
2016	Directors Guild of Canada	Best Production Design	Nominated
2016	Directors Guild of Canada	Best Sound Editing	Nominated
