= Possessor (film) =

2020 film directed by Brandon Cronenberg

- Theatrical release poster
- Directed by: Brandon Cronenberg
- Written by: Brandon Cronenberg
- Produced by: Fraser Ash; Niv Fichman; Kevin Krikst; Andrew Starke
- Starring: Andrea Riseborough; Christopher Abbott; Rossif Sutherland; Tuppence Middleton; Sean Bean; Jennifer Jason Leigh
- Cinematography: Karim Hussain
- Edited by: Matthew Hannam
- Music by: Jim Williams
- Production companies: Ingenious Media; Telefilm Canada; Arclight Films; Ontario Creates; Particular Crowd; Crave; Rhombus Media; Rook Films
- Distributed by: Elevation Pictures (Canada); Signature Entertainment (United Kingdom)
- Release dates: January 25, 2020 (Sundance); October 2, 2020 (United States and Canada); November 27, 2020 (United Kingdom)
- Running time: 104 minutes
- Countries: Canada; United Kingdom
- Language: English
- Box office: $901,093

Possessor is a 2020 science fiction psychological horror film written and directed by Brandon Cronenberg. It stars Andrea Riseborough and Christopher Abbott, with Rossif Sutherland, Tuppence Middleton, Sean Bean, and Jennifer Jason Leigh in supporting roles. Riseborough portrays an assassin who performs her assignments through possessing the bodies of other individuals, but finds herself fighting to control the body of her current host (Abbott).

The film had its world premiere at the Sundance Film Festival on January 25, 2020, and was released in the United States and Canada on October 2, 2020, by Neon and Elevation Pictures, while Signature Entertainment distributed the United Kingdom release on November 27, 2020. It received positive reviews, with praise for its originality and Riseborough, Abbott and Graham's performances.

== Plot ==
Tasya Vos is an assassin who takes control of other people's bodies to carry out her hits. Through an implant installed in the unwitting host's brain, Vos' consciousness is inserted into their minds. She returns to her own body by forcing the host to commit suicide at the end of the job. In the first hit shown, she deviates from her protocol and struggles to control her own gun, instead getting the host shot by shooting at arriving police forces.

Vos struggles with neurological symptoms and increasing detachment from her own identity, and cannot fully separate her work from her interactions with her husband, Michael, and son, Ira. She "practices" assuming her normal persona the same way she practices impersonating her hosts. Thoughts of violence haunt her domestic life, such as when putting Ira to bed and having sex with Michael.

Vos's handler, retired assassin Girder, is critical of her desire to remain connected to her family and expresses the belief that Vos would be a better killer without personal attachments. In a debriefing session meant to reconnect her with her real identity, Vos sorts through a series of objects associated with personal memories and pauses on a butterfly that she pinned and framed as a child. She tells Girder she feels guilty for killing it.

Despite her fragile mental state and fatigue, Vos agrees to perform a major hit on wealthy CEO John Parse and his daughter, Ava, by possessing Ava's fiancé, Colin Tate. While assuming the host's life, the neurological symptoms worsen, but Vos hides this during her handler's check-ins. The hit is only a partial success as Ava dies, but not Parse.

Vos attempts to finish the job per protocol by forcing Tate to shoot himself, but again cannot make him pull the trigger. During a dissociative break, in which Vos struggles to remain in control of Tate's body, he stabs himself in the skull, damaging the implant and causing severe neurological symptoms on Vos's own body, causing her internal physical damage. Vos discovers she can neither leave Tate's body, nor overpower his consciousness. Tate regains control, but is severely disoriented, in shock and traumatised from the violence before him, so he flees the crime scene. He seeks refuge with his friend Reeta, while experiencing fragmented memories of Vos's life.

He kills Reeta while struggling with dissociative memories of the hit on Parse and Ava. Eddie, a co-employee from Tate's workplace reveals himself to be a plant from Vos' agency, and arrives at the apartment to help Vos regain control and complete Tate's suicide. The attempt fails and Tate kills Eddie during another dissociative episode in which Tate becomes aware of Vos's presence inside his body. His consciousness overpowers hers in a psychic confrontation, giving him access to memories of her husband, child and home.

Tate goes to Vos's home and holds her husband at gunpoint, demanding to know what she did to him. Vos appears inside Tate's mind and goads Tate into killing Michael. When Michael knocks the gun from Tate's hand, Tate kills him with a meat cleaver, after which he places the gun in his mouth and asks to be pulled out, suggesting it was Vos in control. Moments later, Ira stabs Tate in the throat, killing him, reminiscent of the opening sequence's stabbing. Vos uses Tate's last moments to shoot Ira dead. Ira is then revealed to also have been a host.

Vos returns to her own body and discovers that it was Girder who had taken control of Ira. With Ira and Michael both dead, she is now free of all human attachments, as Girder wanted.

In another debriefing, Vos sorts through her personal objects again. She contemplates and recognizes the butterfly, but does not express any guilt for killing it. Girder praises her.

== Cast ==
- Andrea Riseborough as Tasya Vos
- Christopher Abbott as Colin Tate
- Jennifer Jason Leigh as Girder
- Sean Bean as John Parse
- Rossif Sutherland as Michael Vos
- Tuppence Middleton as Ava Parse
- Kaniehtiio Horn as Reeta
- Raoul Bhaneja as Eddie
- Gage Graham-Arbuthnot as Ira Vos
- Rachael Crawford as Dr. Melis
- Hrant Alianak as lead technician
- Gabrielle Graham as Holly Bergman

== Production ==
In May 2018, it was announced Andrea Riseborough and Christopher Abbott had joined the cast of the film, with Brandon Cronenberg directing from a screenplay he wrote. Fraser Ash, Niv Fichman, Kevin Krikst, and Andrew Starke produced the film under their Rhombus Media and Rook Films banners. The film was also produced by Telefilm Canada, with Elevation Pictures distributing the film in Canada. In February 2019, Jennifer Jason Leigh, Stacy Martin and Sean Bean joined the cast of the film. In May 2019, Tuppence Middleton joined the cast of the film, replacing Martin.

=== Filming ===
Principal photography began on April 9, 2019, and concluded on May 14 in Ontario, Canada.

== Release ==
In November 2018, Well Go USA Entertainment pre-emptively acquired U.S. distribution rights to the film. The film later had its world premiere at the Sundance Film Festival on January 25, 2020. Shortly after, Neon was announced to be partnering on the American release of the film with Well Go USA, which would handle the film's home media release. It was released in the United States and Canada on October 2, 2020. The film was released in the United Kingdom on November 27, 2020, by Signature Entertainment.

On May 31, 2023, it was announced that Possessor and Cronenberg's 2023 film Infinity Pool would receive a double feature in three North American theaters in June, with Cronenberg in attendance. The first for both films to theatrically screen in their uncut form, the screenings took place at the Alamo Drafthouse Cinema in San Francisco on the 20th, the Aero Theatre in Los Angeles on the 21st via American Cinematheque, and the Metrograph in New York City on the 23rd.

== Reception ==
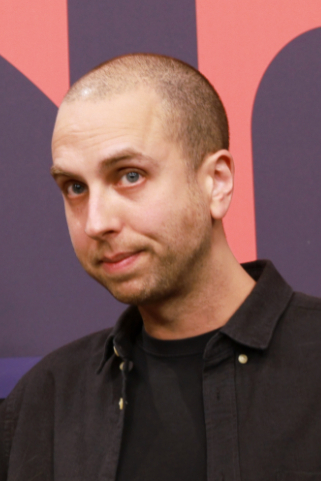
Cronenberg's direction received praise.

On the review aggregator website Rotten Tomatoes, 94% of 224 critic ratings are positive for Possessor, and the average rating is 7.8/10. The website's consensus reads, "Further refining his provocative vision, writer-director Brandon Cronenberg uses Possessor's potentially over-the-top premise as a delivery mechanism for stylishly disturbing thrills." On Metacritic, the film has a weighted average score of 72 out of 100, based on 23 critics, indicating "generally favorable reviews".

The film received a positive review by David Sims in The Atlantic, who wrote: "Cronenberg isn't just looking to provoke with blood and guts—like all good dystopian fiction, Possessor offers disturbing and timely observations about the world we already live in." It was a New York Times Critic's Pick, with Glenn Kenny praising the film's formal sophistication.

The film's opening sequence was singled out for praise, particularly Gabrielle Graham's performance as Holly in the sequence. David Ehrlich from IndieWire called it "a coldly compelling prologue"; and Wendy Ide from Screen Daily agreed: "In a memorable cameo role in the film’s opening, Gabrielle Graham also makes an impact."

Meagan Navarro of Bloody Disgusting gave the film a score of four-and-a-half out of five, writing: "Like dad David Cronenberg, Brandon Cronenberg has a unique way of testing the boundaries of comfort and exploring the human mind and body in squeamish fashion." John DeFore of The Hollywood Reporter praised the film's direction, visuals, as well as its performances, and special effects. Rob Hunter of Film School Rejects gave the film a positive review, writing: "While Possessor retains his family's love of body horror and morally misused electronics it also manages an engrossing pace, engaging characters, unrelentingly brutal violence, erect penises, a must-own Halloween mask, a mean-spirited Sean Bean, one hell of an ending, and more ... All of it, though, is fantastically and cruelly unforgettable." Chris Evangelista of Slashfilm gave the film ten out of ten, writing: "Bathed in blood and gore, and unrelentingly aggressive, Brandon Cronenberg's Possessor is unlike anything you’ve ever seen before. It is a singular work – one so ghastly, so unique, and so brutal that it will awe some and disgust others."

JoBlo.com's Chris Bumbray gave the film a score of eight out of ten, stating that the film "recalls many of his father David Cronenberg's previous works", Bunbray further praised Abbott and Riseborough's performances, as well as similar praise towards the film's visual style. David Ehrlich from IndieWire also gave the film a grade of "B−", praising Cronenberg's direction as well as the film's cinematography, visuals, and performances, while also stating it did not fully realize its potential.

=== Accolades ===
Possessor won the awards for Best Feature Length Film and Best Direction at the Sitges Film Festival in 2020. It was also given the Grand Prize at the 2021 Gérardmer Film Festival, where Jim Williams won for Original Score. The film received three nominations at the inaugural Critics' Choice Super Awards in the Science Fiction/Fantasy category, for Best Movie, Best Actor, and Best Actress. It was named to the Toronto International Film Festival's year-end Canada's Top Ten list for feature films. Special makeup effects artist Dan Martin won the Fangoria Chainsaw Award for best makeup effects. The film won the Golden Monster Award for Best Feature Film, as well as Best Director at the 2020 Monster Fest in Australia.

Accolades
Year	Award	Category	Recipient	Result	Ref.
2020	Sitges Film Festival	Best Feature Length Film	Possessor	Won	
2020	Sitges Film Festival	Best Direction	Brandon Cronenberg	Won	
2020	Monster Fest	Golden Monster Award for Best Feature Film	Possessor	Won	
2020	Monster Fest	Best Director	Brandon Cronenberg	Won	
2020	Sundance Film Festival	World Cinema Dramatic Competition	Possessor	Nominated	
2020	St. Louis Film Critics Association Awards	Best Horror Film	Possessor: Uncut	Nominated	
2020	Indiana Film Journalists Association	Best Film	Possessor	Nominated	
2020	Indiana Film Journalists Association	Best Original Screenplay	Brandon Cronenberg	Nominated	
2020	Indiana Film Journalists Association	Best Director	Brandon Cronenberg	Nominated	
2020	Indiana Film Journalists Association	Best Actor	Christopher Abbott	Nominated	
2020	Indiana Film Journalists Association	Best Musical Score	Jim Williams	Nominated	
2020	Indiana Film Journalists Association	Original Vision	Possessor	Nominated	
2021	Gérardmer Film Festival	Grand Prize	Possessor	Won	
2021	Gérardmer Film Festival	Best Original Score	Jim Williams	Won	
2021	Critics' Choice Super Awards	Best Science Fiction/Fantasy Movie	Possessor	Nominated	
2021	Critics' Choice Super Awards	Best Actor in a Science Fiction/Fantasy Movie	Christopher Abbott	Nominated	
2021	Critics' Choice Super Awards	Best Actress in a Science Fiction/Fantasy Movie	Andrea Riseborough	Nominated	
2021	Fangoria Chainsaw Awards	Best Makeup Effects	Dan Martin	Won	
2021	Fangoria Chainsaw Awards	Best Limited Release Movie	Possessor	Nominated	
2021	Fangoria Chainsaw Awards	Best Score	Jim Williams	Nominated	
2021	Fangoria Chainsaw Awards	Best Lead Performance	Andrea Riseborough	Nominated	
2021	46th Saturn Awards	Best Independent Film	Possessor	Nominated	
2021	Vancouver Film Critics Circle	Best Canadian Film	Possessor	Nominated	
2021	Vancouver Film Critics Circle	Best Director of a Canadian Film	Brandon Cronenberg	Won	
2021	Vancouver Film Critics Circle	Best Screenplay for a Canadian Film	Brandon Cronenberg	Nominated	
2021	Vancouver Film Critics Circle	Best Actress in a Canadian Film	Andrea Riseborough	Nominated	
2021	Vancouver Film Critics Circle	Vancouver Film Critics Circle Award for Best Supporting Actor in a Canadian Film	Christopher Abbott	Won	
2021	Vancouver Film Critics Circle	Vancouver Film Critics Circle Award for Best Supporting Actress in a Canadian Film	Jennifer Jason Leigh	Nominated	
2021	Canadian Screen Awards	Best Achievement in Direction	Brandon Cronenberg	Nominated	
2021	Canadian Screen Awards	Best Achievement in Makeup	Traci Loader, Dan Martin & Dorota Mitoraj	Nominated	
2021	Detroit Film Critics Society	Best Actor	Christopher Abbott	Nominated	
2021	Detroit Film Critics Society	Best Use of Music	Jim Williams	Nominated	

Possessor and its uncut version appeared on numerous critic's year-end lists including:

- 1st – Jason Shawhan, Nashville Scene
- 3rd — Jim Ridley, Nashville Scene
- 4th — Angelica Jade Bastién, Vulture
- 5th — Elena Lazic, Sight and Sound
- 8th — Guy Lodge, Sight and Sound
