= Disappearance at Clifton Hill =

2019 Canadian thriller film

- Film poster
- Directed by: Albert Shin
- Written by: Albert Shin; James Schultz
- Produced by: Fraser Ash; Kevin Krikst
- Starring: Tuppence Middleton; Hannah Gross; David Cronenberg
- Cinematography: Catherine Lutes
- Edited by: Cam McLauchlin
- Music by: Alex Sowinski; Leland Whitty
- Production company: Rhombus Media
- Distributed by: Elevation Pictures
- Release date: September 5, 2019 (TIFF)
- Country: Canada
- Language: English
- Box office: $25,084

Disappearance at Clifton Hill (initially known as Clifton Hill) is a 2019 Canadian thriller film, directed by Albert Shin. The film stars Tuppence Middleton as Abby, a young woman who returns home to Niagara Falls, Ontario, when she inherits a family-owned motel in the city's Clifton Hill tourist district following her mother's death, and becomes obsessed with reconstructing inchoate childhood memories of witnessing a kidnapping.

The film's cast also includes Hannah Gross, Marie-Josée Croze, Andy McQueen, Noah Reid, Dan Lett, Aaron Poole, Connor Jessup, Elizabeth Saunders, and Maxwell McCabe-Lokos, as well as filmmaker David Cronenberg as a local historian and podcaster. The film was nominated for four Canadian Screen Award nominations, including Best Supporting Actor for McQueen.

== Plot ==
While out fishing and picnicking with her family near their home at Niagara Falls, seven-year-old Abby wanders off and encounters a young, abused boy, hiding in the woods. A couple throw the boy into the trunk of their car and abduct him. Traumatized and scared, Abby remains silent about what she witnessed.

Now an adult, Abby returns to Niagara Falls following the death of her mother. Throughout her adult life, Abby has had various problems, one of them being a compulsive liar. Her mother has left a now defunct motel, The Rainbow, to Abby and her sister, Laure. Laure wants to sell the motel to a prominent local family, however Abby is reluctant to do so, still obsessed with the abduction of the "one-eyed boy".

Abby begins to investigate the mystery of the boy in the woods. She soon discovers his name, Alex Moulin; the son of a husband-and-wife magical act known as the Magnificent Moulins. Following their son's disappearance, the Moulins moved to America.

Abby meets local conspiracy theorist and podcaster Walter Bell, who is of the opinion that Alex did not commit suicide, as no trace of his body was ever found. He's always held on to strong suspicions that the powerful Lake family was responsible for boys' disappearances in the past.

To continue with her investigation, Abby requires access to Charlie Lake's office; she pretends to have signed the papers authorizing the sale of the motel (she has, in fact, signed them in disappearing ink). While at his office she sees a photo of the Moulins and a woman, Beverly Mole, who worked with them as an animal trainer. Apprehensive of Abby's inquiries, Charlie makes ominous threats causing her to rush out in fear.

Abby makes contact with Beverly Mole, luring her with casino access along with free hotel accommodation at The Rainbow. Beverly arrives along with her husband Gerry. While Beverly is gambling, Abby attempts to dig up more information, but Beverly returns to her room early after a dispute at the casino. She angrily leaves.

Abby uses her sister's passport to travel to America to see the Magnificent Moulins magic show. After the show, a strange encounter occurs between the three of them. Upon returning home to Canada, the authorities discover Abby's stolen passport and arrest her.

Still undeterred and determined, Abby breaks into Beverly's house where she finds Gerry chained up. He confesses that he and his wife kidnapped Alex, with the intent to blackmail the Moulins. The police arrest Beverly and rescue Gerry, finding crucial and incriminating evidence.

After Gerry's confession, the case garners a media frenzy. Charlie Lake is soon arrested, all the while proclaiming his innocence in Alex's murder. The Moulins manipulate the media attention, pleading their ignorance and innocence of any wrongdoing against their son, while making threats of slander lawsuits.

Life in town returns to normal and Abby moves on, now employed at another, more up-market motel. A man with an eye patch walks in to rent out a room for an indefinite amount of time. Appearing to be not much older than Abby, he asks if perhaps they've met before. Noticing a newspaper on the desk with Charlie's picture, the guest tells Abby that Lake is not lying and states that in fact, he saved that boy's life. Abby stares after him in wonderment as the man walks away from the reception area towards his room.

== Cast ==
- Tuppence Middleton as Abby
- Hannah Gross as Laure
- Eric Johnson as Charlie Lake
- Marie-Josée Croze as Mrs. Moulin
- Paulino Nunes as Mr. Moulin
- Andy McQueen as Singh
- Elizabeth Saunders as Bev Mole
- Maxwell McCabe-Lokos as Gerry Mole
- David Cronenberg as Walter Bell
- Noah Reid as Marcus
- Dan Lett as Randy
- Aaron Poole as The One-Eyed Man

== Production ==
The film was based in part on Shin's own life. His parents formerly owned a motel in Niagara Falls, where Shin has childhood memories of witnessing what he understood at the time to be a kidnapping. However, during the making of the film, he faced resistance from the Clifton Hill business improvement association, because the organization feared that the film would paint the city and the district in a negative light.

== Release ==
The film premiered at the 2019 Toronto International Film Festival under the title Clifton Hill. IFC Midnight obtained the U.S. distribution rights to the film and released it on February 28, 2020.

== Reception ==
=== Critical reception ===
According to review aggregator Rotten Tomatoes, 73% of 46 critics have given the film a positive review, with an average rating of 6.6/10. The website's critics consensus reads, "While admittedly a bit less than the sum of its intriguing parts, Disappearance at Clifton Hill offers an entertaining diversion for noir fans." On Metacritic, another aggregator, the film has a weighted average score of 61 out of 100 based on 11 critics, indicating "generally favorable reviews".

Sheri Linden of The Hollywood Reporter praised the film, writing, "Between its opening image of a fish dangling on a hook (a stand-in for the audience?) and its flawlessly underplayed final moment, it casts a one-of-a-kind spell." Radheyan Simonpillai of NOW Toronto gave the film 4 out of 5 stars, writing, "Niagara's clash between gaudy neon lights, dingy diners, shadowy alleys and general David Lynch vibes sets the stage for a mystery that may only be imagined." Barry Hertz of The Globe and Mail gave the film 3.5 out of 4, writing that "Clifton Hill becomes just as thrilling and disturbing as its titular strip of haunted houses and fading-fast motels."

Conversely, Nick Allen of RogerEbert.com gave the film 2 out of 4 stars, writing, "Pulpy Canadian whodunit Disappearance at Clifton Hill is never as fun as it should be;" and fellow RogerEbert.com critic Brian Tallerico panned the film, writing, "Disappointingly flat in filmmaking terms, both in the lackluster design and dull performances." Scott Tobias of Variety also criticized the film, writing, "The deeper the film goes, the more it loses its grip."

=== Accolades ===
Award	Date of ceremony	Category	Nominee(s)	Result	Ref.
Canadian Screen Awards	28 May 2020	Best Cinematography	Catherine Lutes	Nominated	
Canadian Screen Awards	28 May 2020	Best Editing	Cam McLauchlin	Nominated	
Canadian Screen Awards	28 May 2020	Best Sound Editing	Paul Germann, Claire Dobson, John Sievert, Jason Charbonneau and Randy Wilson	Nominated	
Canadian Screen Awards	28 May 2020	Best Supporting Actor	Andy McQueen	Nominated	
Directors Guild of Canada	26 October 2019	Outstanding Picture Editing – Feature Film	Cam McLauchlin	Nominated	
Directors Guild of Canada	26 October 2019	Outstanding Production Design – Feature Film	Chris Crane	Nominated	
Vancouver Film Critics Circle	16 December 2019	Best Supporting Actor in a Canadian Film	David Cronenberg	Nominated	
