= Seven Veils (film) =

2023 film by Atom Egoyan

- Theatrical release poster
- Directed by: Atom Egoyan
- Written by: Atom Egoyan
- Produced by: Niv Fichman; Atom Egoyan; Simone Urdl; Fraser Ash; Kevin Krikst
- Starring: Amanda Seyfried; Rebecca Liddiard; Vinessa Antoine; Mark O'Brien; Douglas Smith
- Cinematography: Paul Sarossy
- Edited by: David Wharnsby
- Music by: Mychael Danna
- Production companies: Rhombus Media; Ego Film Arts
- Distributed by: Elevation Pictures
- Release dates: September 10, 2023 (TIFF); March 7, 2025 (U.S.)
- Running time: 107 minutes
- Country: Canada
- Language: English
- Box office: $124,078

Seven Veils is a 2023 Canadian drama film written and directed by Atom Egoyan. The film stars Amanda Seyfried as Jeanine, a theatre director who is dealing with repressed trauma as she prepares to mount a production of the opera Salome. Rebecca Liddiard, Douglas Smith, Mark O'Brien, and Vinessa Antoine also star.

== Cast ==
- Amanda Seyfried as Jeanine
- Rebecca Liddiard as Clea
- Douglas Smith as Luke
- Mark O'Brien as Paul
- Vinessa Antoine as Rachel
- Michael Kupfer-Radecky as Johann / John the Baptist
- Ambur Braid as Ambur / Salome

== Production ==
In February 2023, it was announced Amanda Seyfried had joined the cast of the film, with Atom Egoyan directing from a screenplay he wrote. It was Seyfried's second role in an Egoyan movie, after the 2009 film Chloe. In March 2023, Rebecca Liddiard, Douglas Smith, Mark O'Brien and Vinessa Antoine joined the cast, with principal photography concluding in Toronto. Rhombus Media, Ego Film Arts, Cinetic Media, IPR.VC and Crave produced and financed the movie.

== Release ==
Seven Veils had its world premiere at the Toronto International Film Festival on September 10, 2023. It was also selected for the lineup of the 2023 Cinéfest Sudbury International Film Festival, the 2023 Atlantic International Film Festival, the 2023 Vancouver International Film Festival, the 2023 Festival du Nouveau Cinéma de Montréal, the 2024 International Film Festival of Ottawa, and the 2024 Victoria Film Festival.

The film's American premiere took place during the 2024 Armenian Film Festival in Glendale, California. The film was given a United States release in theaters on March 7, 2025, by XYZ Films and Variance Films.

== Reception ==
The film received generally positive reviews. On the review aggregator website Rotten Tomatoes, 77% of 60 critics' reviews are positive. The website's consensus reads: "One of director Atom Egoyan's most successful efforts in years and a multidimensional showcase for Amanda Seyfried, Seven Veils dives from the rafters to make an uneven but ultimately insightful landing." Metacritic, which uses a weighted average, assigned the film a score of 62 out of 100, based on 19 critics, indicating "generally favorable" reviews.

Martin Tsai wrote on TheWrap: "Seven Veils feels like a true return to form for Egoyan, almost as if Salome has inspired Egoyan’s entire filmography. To be sure, his work is often challenging, but the themes are fully connected and realized here. The screenplay is intricate and thoughtful. It’s just such a thrill to witness artistry and craftsmanship in every facet."

In Deadline Hollywood, Stephanie Bunbury wrote: "Seyfried’s Jeanine never cracks under these pressures; Egoyan habitually gives explosive emotions a wide berth, refusing to allow characters or audience any kind of catharsis. It is an unforgiving kind of stringency; his frigidity leaves many viewers cold. But it works well here and, for those of us with a taste for it, that coldness is satisfyingly bracing."

In a negative review for The Telegraph, film critic Tim Robey wrote: "Seven Veils is content to waft ideas in our general direction, a common fault of all Egoyan’s weaker films, rather than defining their interplay with anything like Tár's crispness. It mistakenly calls John’s beheading “the first sex crime in the Bible” – even Genesis has the rape of Dinah. And it makes us strain to grasp how the story of Salome and all this backstage malarkey meaningfully inform one another. It’s an egghead exercise, both scrambled and undercooked."

The film was named to TIFF's annual Canada's Top Ten list for 2023.

=== Awards ===
Award	Date of ceremony	Category	Recipient(s)	Result	Ref.
Canadian Screen Awards	2025	Best Director	Atom Egoyan	Nominated	
Canadian Screen Awards	2025	Best Adapted Screenplay	Atom Egoyan	Nominated	
Canadian Screen Awards	2025	Best Art Direction/Production Design	Phillip Barker, Adriana Bogaard, Mark McGann	Nominated	
Canadian Screen Awards	2025	Best Costume Design	Debra Hanson	Nominated	
Canadian Screen Awards	2025	Best Original Score	Mychael Danna	Won	
Canadian Screen Awards	2025	Best Hair	Nathan Rival, Tori Binns	Nominated	
