= Into the Forest =

2015 film by Patricia Rozema

- Theatrical release poster
- Directed by: Patricia Rozema
- Written by: Patricia Rozema
- Based on: Into the Forest by Jean Hegland
- Produced by: Niv Fichman; Aaron L. Gilbert; Elliot Page (Note: Credited as Ellen Page)
- Starring: Elliot Page; Evan Rachel Wood; Max Minghella; Callum Keith Rennie; Michael Eklund; Wendy Crewson
- Cinematography: Daniel Grant
- Edited by: Matthew Hannam
- Music by: Max Richter
- Production companies: Elevation Pictures; Telefilm Canada; Ontario Media Development Corporation; Bron Studios; Rhombus Media; Das Films; Selavy; Vie Entertainment; CW Media Finance
- Distributed by: Elevation Pictures
- Release dates: September 12, 2015 (TIFF); June 3, 2016 (Canada)
- Running time: 101 minutes
- Country: Canada
- Language: English
- Box office: $92,166

Into the Forest is a 2015 Canadian apocalyptic drama film written and directed by Patricia Rozema, based on the 1996 novel of the same name by Jean Hegland. It stars Elliot Page and Evan Rachel Wood as orphaned survivalist sisters in a forest without electrical power.

== Plot ==
In the near future, two teenage sisters, Nell and Eva, live in a remotely located home with their father in a forest. There is a massive, continent-wide power outage that appears to be part of a region-wide technological collapse. The car battery is drained, so they are left stranded for days. Their father eventually gets the car working and they make it to the nearest town, where they buy supplies including gas from a man named Stan. Eva later attends dance class while her sister meets up with her boyfriend, Eli. Returning home, they see a stranded car and the girls' father offers to help the passengers, but the family move on after they brandish guns. The father says that they will not return to town until the power is restored. Later, while cutting down a tree, he cuts his leg badly with a chainsaw. Knowing he is bleeding to death, he tells the girls to take care of each other and love one another. They bury him where he died in the forest.

At two months without power, the girls are low on food. They get by using the skills their father taught them, though they miss the creature comforts they used to enjoy. For example, Eva must dance to a metronome since she can no longer dance to music.

Eli arrives one night, having walked there looking for Nell. He says that all the surrounding houses are abandoned. Nell experiences sex for the first time with Eli. Later, he says there is electricity, food, order and jobs again in Boston. He convinces Nell to go with him but she returns after only one night away, unwilling to leave Eva alone. Nell researches plants for food and medicine and forages. When Nell is certain she is not pregnant, she and Eva celebrate.

Six months pass without power. While Nell is foraging in the forest, Eva is surprised by Stan while chopping wood. He assaults and rapes her, then steals most of the remaining gas and the car. As a result, Nell boards up the house and brings a gun with her whenever venturing outside while Eva stays indoors. At eight months without power, Eva experiences morning sickness and realizes she is pregnant. Nell suggests an abortion but to her surprise, Eva wants to have the baby. Eva explains that she doesn't think any baby should be unwanted, that kids aren't responsible for their parents' actions, that it is its own person, and that she does not think she can lose anything else now. To help nourish Eva during her pregnancy, Nell hunts and butchers a pig.

Fifteen months pass without power. Several roof beams break during a storm and Eva goes into labor. The continually weakening house creaks and groans as both the storm and Eva's labor progresses. Fearing the house will collapse, the sisters flee to a hollowed out tree stump that once served as their play house where Eva gives birth to a baby boy and rejoices. Returning to their ruined home, Eva decides to burn the house down with the remaining gas so they will be safe because anyone passing by will think they died in a fire. They gather all the food and items important to them: books, keepsakes and a family photo. At nightfall, they set the house ablaze, then journey into the forest.

== Cast ==
- Elliot Page as Nell
- Evan Rachel Wood as Eva
- Callum Keith Rennie as Robert, Dad
- Michael Eklund as Stan
- Max Minghella as Eli
- Sandy Sidhu as Quiz Woman
- Jordana Largy as Margot
- Simon Longmore as Biker
- Bethany Brown as Gabs
- Brittany Willacy as Gigi
- Wendy Crewson as Mom

== Production ==
Director Megan Griffiths was considered to direct, but was ultimately passed on by the producers. On October 21, 2013, Elliot Page and Evan Rachel Wood joined the cast. Principal photography and production began on July 28, 2014. On August 27, 2014, Max Minghella and Callum Keith Rennie joined the cast. Page learned how to butcher a pig in order to perform the process well in the film. Wood's methodical approach to getting into Eva's character included eating extremely small portions of food. During the assault scene, the pressure from her screaming caused the blood vessels in her eyes to burst.

== Release ==
The film premiered in the Special Presentation section of the Toronto International Film Festival on September 12, 2015. Shortly thereafter, A24 and DirecTV Cinema acquired U.S. distribution rights to the film, it premiered on DirecTV before showing theatres. In December 2015, the film was announced as part of TIFF's annual Canada's Top Ten screening series of the ten best Canadian films of the year. It was released theatrically in 15 theatres in Canada on June 3, 2016, and in the United States on July 29.

== Reception ==
=== Box office ===
The film played for one week in 15 theatres where it grossed nearly $10,000.

=== Critical response ===
Into the Forest received generally positive reviews from critics. On Rotten Tomatoes, the film holds an approval rating of 76% based on 51 reviews, with an average rating of 6.8/10. The website's critics consensus reads, "Into the Forest grounds its familiar apocalyptic framework with a relatable look at the bond between two sisters, compellingly brought to life by Ellen Page and Evan Rachel Wood." On Metacritic, the film holds a score of 59 out of 100, based on 18 reviews, indicating "mixed or average" reviews.
