= The Mother and the Bear =

2024 film by Johnny Ma

- Theatrical release poster
- Directed by: Johnny Ma
- Written by: Johnny Ma
- Produced by: Juan de Dios Larraín; Niv Fichman
- Starring: Kim Ho-jung
- Cinematography: Inti Briones
- Edited by: Valeria Hernández
- Music by: Marie-Hélène L. Delorme
- Production companies: Rhombus Media; Fábula; Thin Stuff Productions
- Distributed by: Elevation Pictures
- Release date: September 6, 2024 (TIFF)
- Running time: 100 minutes
- Countries: Canada; Chile
- Languages: English; Korean

The Mother and the Bear is a 2024 comedy-drama film written and directed by Johnny Ma. An international co-production between Canada and Chile, the film premiered in the Centrepiece program at the 2024 Toronto International Film Festival, followed by a gala screening at the 2024 Cinéfest Sudbury International Film Festival.

== Synopsis ==
Sara, a woman from South Korea, travels to Canada after her daughter Sumi, who had emigrated to Winnipeg some years earlier, is injured in a fall that leaves her comatose. Upon arrival, Sara discovers how little she truly knew about her daughter's life.

== Cast ==
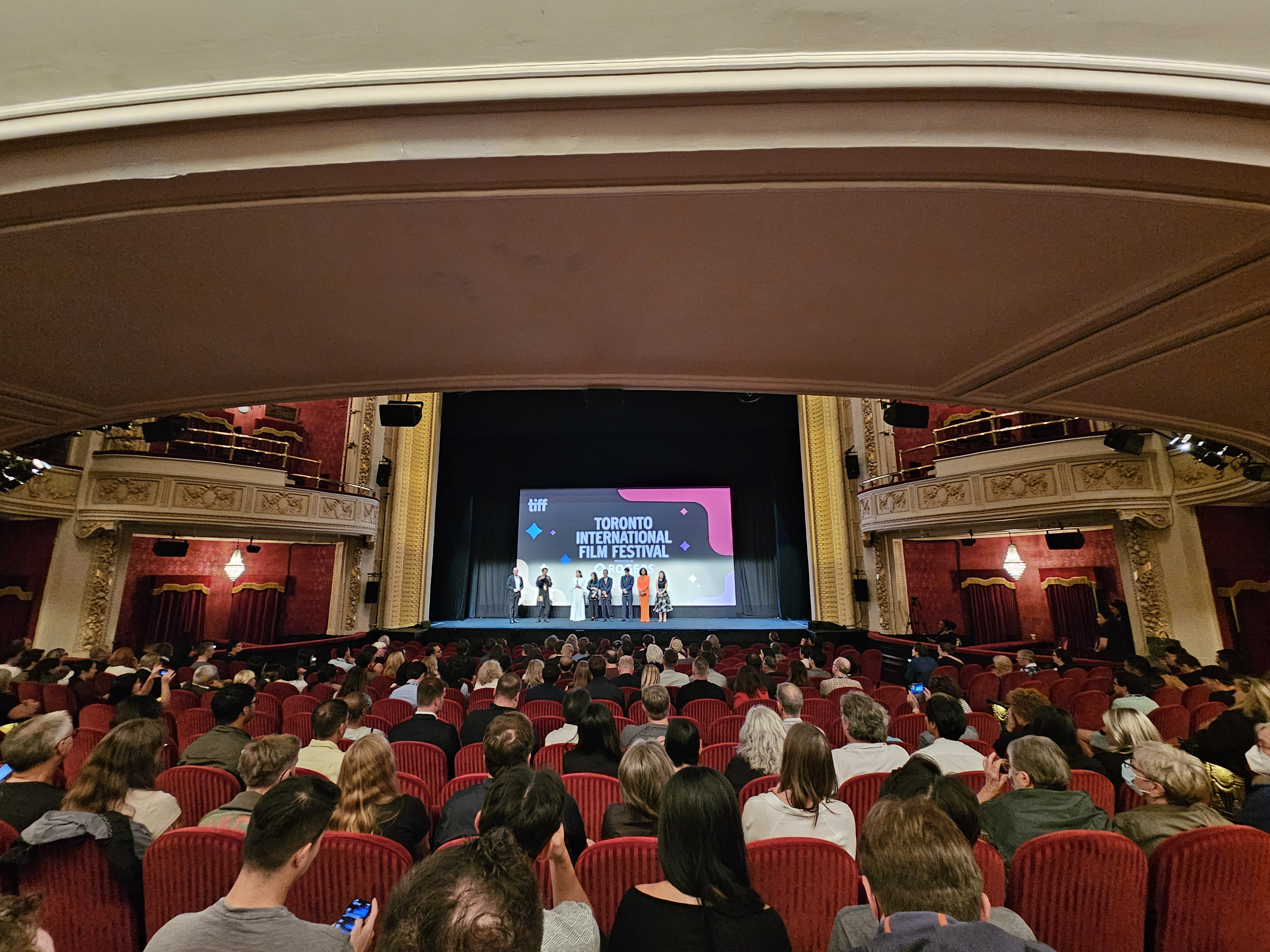
Q and A with the cast at the film's premiere.

- Kim Ho-jung as Sara
- Leere Park as Sumi
- Lee Won-jae
- Jonathan Kim
- Amara Pedroso
- Samantha Kendrick
- Susan Hanson

== Critical response ==
On review aggregator Rotten Tomatoes, 90% of 20 critics gave the film a positive review, with an average rating of 7.4/10.

Ritesh Mehta of IndieWire graded the film a B, writing that "Any weaknesses lie more in the slightly tired general themes Ma explores. The Mother and the Bear doesn't bring a lot of new material to the familiar narrative of parents becoming enlightened towards their child's sexuality. Even the story engine about the discovery of online dating and the chain of cutesy indiscretions that follows doesn't feel particularly novel. After all, Canada has already given global audiences a series worth of laughs at the expense of ajummas, in Kim's Convenience. Though perhaps that's an unfair comparison; maybe it's because we've chuckled alongside that CBC sitcom, or absorbed the pathos of intergenerational Asian journeys (towards the old country) in films like Return to Seoul and The Farewell, that we're able to better appreciate the subtle intermingling of comedy and drama that Ma and Kim bring about in The Mother and the Bear."

Kristy Strouse of Film Inquiry wrote "The Mother and the Bear is a charming and whimsical story brimming with enduring adventures, and self-discovery...Some of the narrative doesn't stand itself apart from other films with similar stories, but Johnny Ma delivers a story that blends comedy and drama with genuine care."

== Awards ==
At Cinéfest, the film won the award for Outstanding Canadian Feature.
