= Adriana Bogaard =

Canadian set and costume designer

Adriana Bogaard is a Canadian film and theatrical set and costume designer. She is most noted for her work on the 2023 film Seven Veils, for which she, Phillip Barker and Mark McGann received a Canadian Screen Award nomination for Best Art Direction or Production Design at the 13th Canadian Screen Awards in 2025.

Her prior credits have included the films Flashback and The King Tide, and the television series The Boys and The Handmaid's Tale. She has been a two-time Art Directors Guild Award nominee for Excellence in Production Design for a One-Hour Contemporary Single-Camera Series, receiving nods in 2019 for The Boys and in 2021 for The Handmaid's Tale.

An alumna of the National Theatre School of Canada and the University of British Columbia, she has also been a theatre director, including of her own original play The Passage.
