= Closet Monster (film) =

- Film poster
- Directed by: Stephen Dunn
- Written by: Stephen Dunn
- Produced by: Kevin Krikst; Fraser Ash; Edward J. Martin
- Starring: Connor Jessup; Aaron Abrams; Joanne Kelly; Aliocha Schneider; Jack Fulton; Sofia Banzhaf; Mary Walsh; Isabella Rossellini
- Cinematography: Bobby Shore
- Edited by: Bryan Atkinson
- Music by: Maya Postepski; Todor Kobakov
- Production companies: Rhombus Media; Best Boy Entertainment
- Distributed by: Elevation Pictures
- Release date: September 13, 2015 (TIFF)
- Running time: 90 minutes
- Country: Canada
- Language: English
- Box office: $42,166 (Domestic only)

Closet Monster is a 2015 Canadian drama film written and directed by Stephen Dunn. It stars Connor Jessup as a closeted gay teenager, using elements of the body horror genre as a metaphor for internalized homophobia.

It premiered at the Toronto International Film Festival, where it won the award for Best Canadian Feature. The film went into general theatrical release across Canada in July 2016.

== Plot ==
When eight-year-old Oscar Madly finds out that his parents are getting divorced, he retreats into a fantasy world filled with happy memories and conversations with his talking pet hamster, Buffy. One night, the young Oscar witnesses a violent homophobic attack on a teenage boy, whose attackers impale him with a metal rod.

Ten years later, eighteen-year-old Oscar is close to graduating and is in the process of applying to a special effects make-up school in New York City. He gets a job at a hardware store in hopes of spending less time with his father, who is casually childish and homophobic. At work, Oscar is drawn to a new employee, the confident and charismatic Wilder, but a sharp pain in Oscar's stomach warns him away. At home, Buffy tells Oscar that he seems happier and suggests that he is in love, a notion he quickly dismisses. Later, Oscar smells a shirt he lent Wilder, attempting to masturbate, but is interrupted by another intense stomach pain.

Oscar and Wilder's friendship develops as Oscar's interactions with his father get increasingly strained. Wilder is fired from the hardware store and decides to move away, inviting Oscar to a goodbye costume party. Returning home to prepare for the party, Oscar finds out that he has been rejected from the make-up school, the only one to which he applied. His father discovers him trying on some of his mother's clothes and the two have a heated argument. Oscar forces his dad into a closet and races over to the party. Oscar spends the night trying to work out whether or not Wilder is gay, but is raped by another partygoer named Andrew from Texas before having painful hallucinations. After passing out, Oscar is roused by Wilder, who takes them back to Oscar's treehouse. Lying together, Wilder asks Oscar how long he has known he was gay, a question Oscar initially tries to avoid, but eventually he admits that he is confused and they finally kiss.

When Oscar wakes, Wilder is gone. Not wanting to see his father, he goes to his mother's house and confronts her for abandoning him in the divorce. She comforts him and suggests that he come live with her. Realizing that he has left Buffy at his father's, Oscar hurries back to retrieve her. Oscar's room has been destroyed by his father, who refuses to tell him where his hamster is. His mother arrives and as his parents fight, Oscar searches for Buffy, eventually finding her corpse in his belongings. His stomach pain returns with a vengeance and he hallucinates a metal rod bursting out of him. He rips it from his body and threatens his father.

At his mother's house, Oscar confesses that he didn't get into the only college he applied to. She suggests an artist's colony on Fogo Island where he can express his creativity. After arriving on the island, he has a final conversation with Buffy and accepts the truth about himself. Buffy reveals her truth to Oscar: that she is obviously not the original hamster from his childhood and that she has been replaced many times by his parents. He places her into a small wooden boat and pushes her body out to sea. He returns to his room and thinks back on happier times with his father.

== Cast ==
- Connor Jessup as Oscar Madly
  - Jack Fulton as Young Oscar
- Aaron Abrams as Peter Madly
- Isabella Rossellini as Buffy (voice)
- Joanne Kelly as Brin Madly
- Aliocha Schneider as Wilder
- Sofia Banzhaf as Gemma
- Mary Walsh as Allison
- James Hawksley as Andrew from Texas

== Production ==
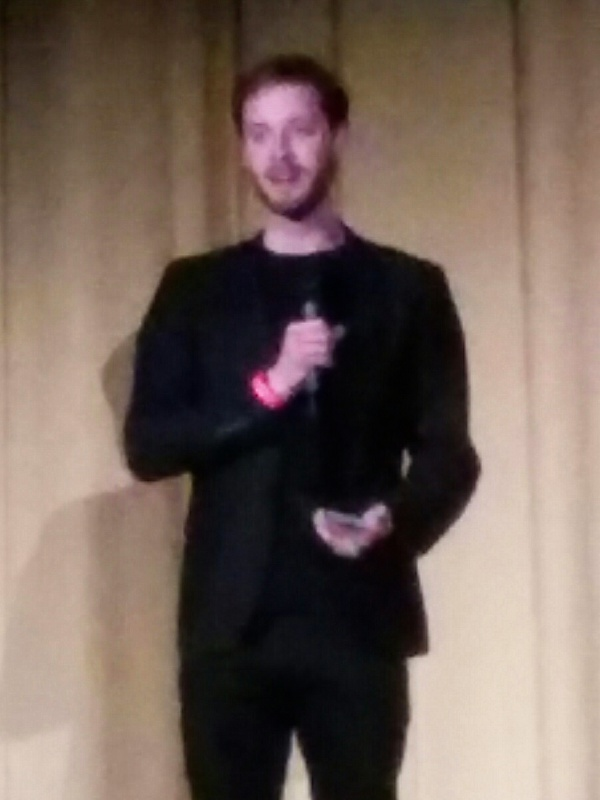
Director Stephen Dunn at a screening of the film in 2016

Closet Monster is Dunn's feature film directorial debut. The film is inspired by Dunn's experiences growing up as a gay teenager in St. John's, Newfoundland and Labrador. Dunn said a series of gay hate crimes in St. John's when he was growing up had a strong impact on him, his coming out and dealings with internalized homophobia.

The film was shot primarily in St. John's, with an additional scene shot on Fogo Island, and is a Rhombus Media and Best Boy Entertainment production. The film was funded and produced with the participation of Telefilm Canada, Newfoundland & Labrador Film Development Corporation, The Harold Greenberg Fund and Rogers Telefund. The film was distributed by Elevation Pictures in Canada, with Fortissimo Films handling international sales.

== Reception ==
The film won the award for Best Canadian Feature Film at the 2015 Toronto International Film Festival. In December, the film was announced as part of TIFF's annual Canada's Top Ten screening series of the ten best Canadian films of the year. The film also won the award for Best Canadian Film at the 2016 Inside Out Film and Video Festival.

On review aggregate website Rotten Tomatoes, Closest Monster has an approval rating of 82% based on 34 reviews, with an average rating of 6.8/10. The website's critics consensus reads, "Closet Monster is a unique, understated fable, buoyed by a strong performance from Connor Jessup." The film also currently holds a weighted average score of 81 out of 100 on Metacritic based on 11 reviews, indicating "universal acclaim".

== See also ==
- List of lesbian, gay, bisexual or transgender-related films of 2015
