= BlackBerry (film) =

2023 Canadian film directed by Matt Johnson

- Theatrical release poster
- Directed by: Matt Johnson
- Screenplay by: Matt Johnson; Matthew Miller
- Based on: Losing the Signal: The Untold Story Behind the Extraordinary Rise and Spectacular Fall of BlackBerry by: Jacquie McNish; Sean Silcoff
- Produced by: Fraser Ash; Niv Fichman; Kevin Krikst; Matthew Miller
- Starring: Jay Baruchel; Glenn Howerton; Matt Johnson; Rich Sommer; Michael Ironside; Saul Rubinek; Cary Elwes
- Cinematography: Jared Raab
- Edited by: Curt Lobb
- Music by: Jay McCarrol
- Production companies: XYZ Films; Rhombus Media; Zapruder Films
- Distributed by: Elevation Pictures
- Release dates: February 17, 2023 (Berlin); May 12, 2023 (Canada)
- Running time: 121 minutes
- Country: Canada
- Language: English
- Budget: $10 million
- Box office: $2.8 million

BlackBerry is a 2023 Canadian biographical comedy-drama film directed by Matt Johnson from a script he wrote with Matthew Miller. It was loosely adapted from Jacquie McNish and Sean Silcoff's book Losing the Signal: The Untold Story Behind the Extraordinary Rise and Spectacular Fall of BlackBerry. The film is a dramatized account of the history of the BlackBerry line of mobile phones created by co-founders Douglas Fregin (played by Johnson) and Mike Lazaridis (Jay Baruchel), and investor Jim Balsillie (Glenn Howerton). The film also stars Rich Sommer, Michael Ironside, Saul Rubinek, and Cary Elwes in supporting roles.

BlackBerry premiered in competition at the 73rd Berlin International Film Festival on February 17, 2023. The film was released in Canada on May 12, 2023, to critical acclaim. In late 2023, Blackberry was re-released as a three-part miniseries with additional footage. The film is the most nominated film in the history of the Canadian Screen Awards, with 17 nominations. It won 14 awards, including Best Motion Picture.

== Plot ==
In Waterloo, Ontario in 1996, Research in Motion (RIM) CEO Mike Lazaridis and his best friend and co-founder Douglas Fregin prepare to pitch their "PocketLink" cellular device to businessman Jim Balsillie. Their pitch is unsuccessful, but after Balsillie is fired from his job due to his aggressive ambition, he offers to invest $20,000 for 50% of the company and a position as CEO. Lazaridis, prompted by Fregin, initially declines Balsillie's offer, but after confirming Balsillie's suspicion that their $16 million deal with USRobotics was in bad faith, they bring Balsillie in as a co-CEO with Lazaridis and sell him a 33% stake in RIM for $125,000. After joining RIM, Balsillie discovers that the company is in a dire financial position and he mortgages his house to add a cash infusion to make payroll.

Balsillie arranges a pitch for the PocketLink with Bell Atlantic and forces Fregin and Lazaridis to build a crude prototype overnight, which he and Lazaridis take to New York. Lazaridis forgets the prototype in their taxi, leaving Balsillie to attempt the pitch alone. Lazaridis recovers the prototype at the last second and finishes the pitch, and they rebrand the PocketLink as the "BlackBerry", which becomes massively successful.

In 2003, Palm Inc. CEO Carl Yankowski plans a hostile takeover of the immensely successful RIM, leading Balsillie to try to raise RIM's stockprice by selling more phones than Bell Atlantic's (now Verizon Communications) network can support. This does crash the network, as Lazaridis had warned, so Balsillie poaches engineers from around the world to fix the problem, as well as hiring a man named Charles Purdy as RIM's chief operating officer to keep the engineers in line. Purdy's employment upsets Fregin, who values the casual and fun work environment he and Lazaridis had created. The new engineers fix the network issue under Purdy's strict management, and RIM avoids Yankowski's buyout.

In 2007, RIM's upcoming pitch of the BlackBerry Bold to Verizon is thrown into chaos when Steve Jobs announces the iPhone, much to Lazaridis and Fregin's irritation. Balsillie, a hockey fan with a long-term ambition of owning an NHL team, is occupied with trying to purchase the Pittsburgh Penguins, forcing Lazaridis to pitch the Bold with Fregin instead. When it goes poorly, he panics and impulsively promises them the BlackBerry Storm, a touchscreen device. As Lazaridis finally agrees with Purdy's suggestion to outsource the labor of the Storm to China, he insults Fregin during an argument. Fregin later quits RIM as a result.

Balsillie becomes nervous when he sees the iPhone's projected sales and tries to arrange a meeting with the CEO of AT&T, only to learn that the Penguins sale is being finalized that day. He prioritizes the Penguins but is rejected when the NHL owners reveal knowledge of his plan to move the team to Hamilton, which they learned of through his boasting to Yankowski. The US SEC raid RIM after learning that Balsillie hired the engineers in 2003 with illegally backdated stock options, threatening Lazaridis with legal action. Balsillie misses his chance to meet with AT&T's CEO, who snubs Balsillie by hinting that AT&T's partnership with Apple is predicated on the fact that data usage has superseded phone minutes as a priority. Balsillie returns to RIM to find that Lazaridis has exposed him to the SEC, leaving Lazaridis as the sole CEO of RIM.

One year later, the Storms arrive from China, but Lazaridis finds them to be laden with bugs and can hear buzzing when he holds one to his ear. He begins manually fixing the buzzing phones one by one.

Captions over the film's closing titles reveal that the Storms were almost universally inoperable and Verizon sued RIM to cover the financial loss. Lazaridis resigned as CEO in 2012, Balsillie avoided jail, and Fregin had secretly become one of the richest men in the world by selling his stock in 2007 after he left RIM. At the height of RIM's success, BlackBerry phones made up 45% of the cell phone market; today their market share is 0%, and BlackBerry phones are no longer produced.

== Cast ==
- Jay Baruchel as Mike Lazaridis
- Glenn Howerton as Jim Balsillie
- Matt Johnson as Doug Fregin
- Rich Sommer as Paul Stannos
- Michael Ironside as Charles Purdy
- Martin Donovan as Rick Brock
- Michelle Giroux as Dara Frankel
- SungWon Cho as Ritchie Cheung
- Mark Critch as Gary Bettman
- Saul Rubinek as John Woodman
- Cary Elwes as Carl Yankowski
- Ben Petrie as Allan Lewis

== Production ==
Principal photography took place from June to August 2022 in the Ontario cities of Hamilton, London, Burlington and Waterloo. Additional scenes were filmed in Silicon Valley, California. In June, the London International Airport was used to film multiple airport scenes, employing local residents as background actors.

== Release ==
BlackBerry premiered in competition at the 73rd Berlin International Film Festival on February 17, 2023. IFC Films acquired the rights to distribute the film in the United States, with Paramount Global Content Distribution acquiring multiple international territories for distribution. The film was released in Canada on May 12, 2023, by Elevation Pictures.

In January 2024, Elevation Pictures struck a 35 mm print of the film to screen and it closed TIFF's Canada's Top Ten at the TIFF Lightbox. Johnson and guest Vass Bednar led a Q&A after the screening. The print would later be screened in the United States.

=== Television miniseries ===
An extended, serialized version of the film began airing as a three-part miniseries on CBC Television and the CBC Gem streaming service on November 9, 2023. It includes 16 minutes of additional footage that was not part of the theatrical release. In the United States the series aired on AMC and streamed on AMC+, on November 13, 2023.

== Reception ==
=== Critical response ===
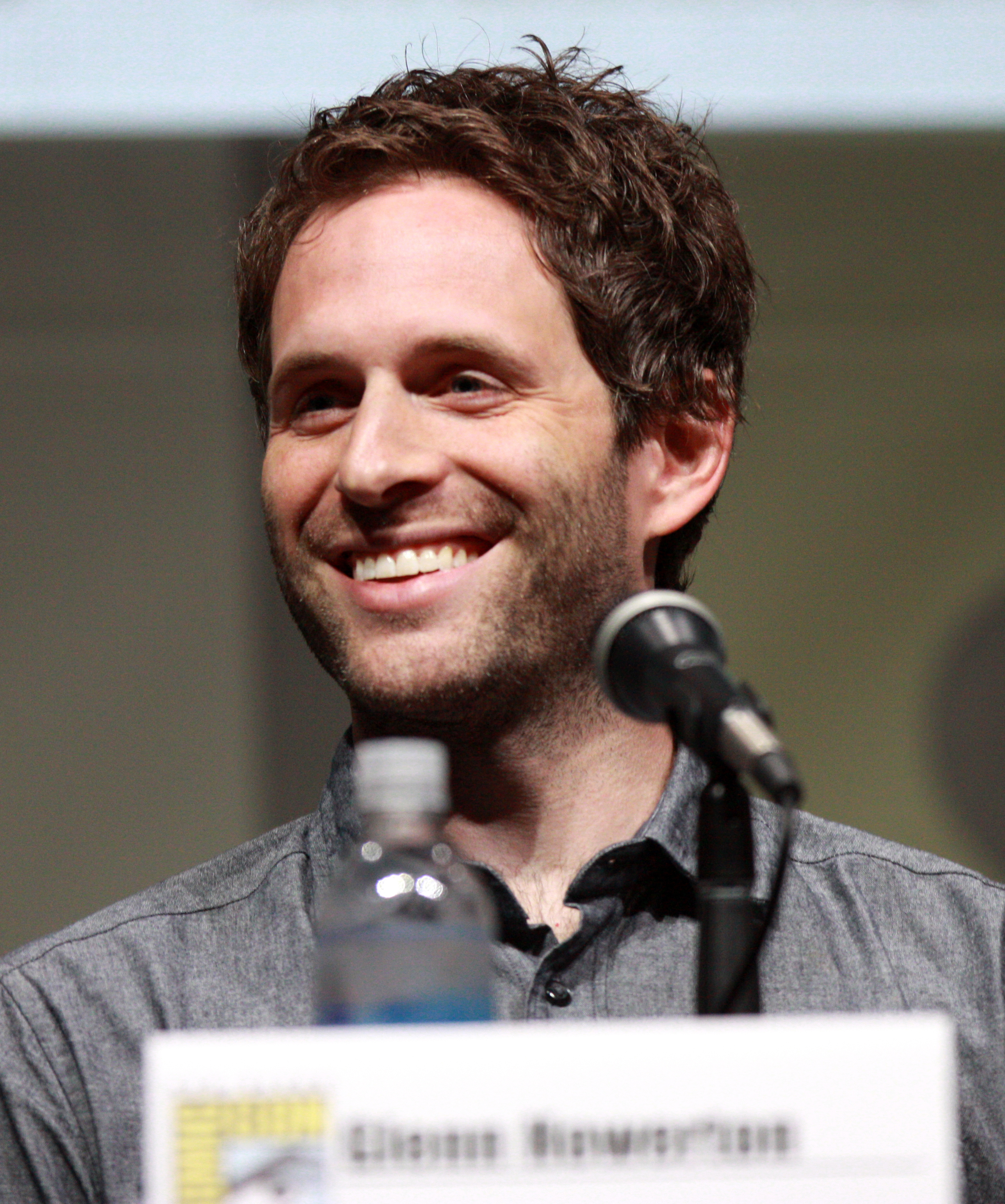
Glenn Howerton received critical acclaim for his role in the film.

On the review aggregator website Rotten Tomatoes, 98% of 209 critics' reviews are positive, with an average rating of 7.8/10. The website's consensus reads: "With intelligence as sharp as its humor, BlackBerry takes a terrifically entertaining look at the rise and fall of a generation-defining gadget." Metacritic, which uses a weighted average, assigned the film a score of 78 out of 100, based on 46 critics, indicating "generally favorable" reviews.

Barry Hertz of The Globe and Mail named the film as third of the 23 best Canadian comedy films ever made. The film was named to the Toronto International Film Festival's annual Canada's Top Ten list for 2023. It was also named as the fourth-best film of 2023 by film critic Cory Woodroof for USA Today's For the Win.

Former company executives have taken issues and raised concerns at the magnitude of fiction presented in the movie, with some considering it to be offensive to RIM's legacy. Balsillie said his on-screen depiction as an aggressive and amoral businessman is almost entirely fictional, but praised the film and described Howerton's performance as "brilliant".

=== Accolades ===
Award	Date of ceremony	Category	Recipient(s)	Result	Ref.
Berlin International Film Festival	February 25, 2023	Golden Bear	BlackBerry	Nominated	
Hollywood Critics Association Midseason Film Awards	June 30, 2023	Best Picture	BlackBerry	Nominated	
Hollywood Critics Association Midseason Film Awards	June 30, 2023	Best Indie	BlackBerry	Runner-up	
Hollywood Critics Association Midseason Film Awards	June 30, 2023	Best Supporting Actor	Glenn Howerton	Won	
Gotham Independent Film Awards	November 27, 2023	Outstanding Supporting Performance	Glenn Howerton	Nominated	
National Board of Review	December 6, 2023	Top 10 Independent Films	BlackBerry	Won (Note: This award does not have a single winner, but recognizes multiple films.)	
Chicago Film Critics Association Awards	December 12, 2023	Best Supporting Actor	Glenn Howerton	Nominated	
IndieWire Critics Poll	December 11, 2023	Best Performance	Glenn Howerton	10th Place (Note: Tied with Benoit Magimel for Pacifiction, Koji Yakusho for Perfect Days and Franz Rogowski for Passages.)	
Georgia Film Critics Association Awards	January 5, 2024	Best Supporting Actor	Glenn Howerton	Nominated	
Astra Film and Creative Arts Awards	January 6, 2024	Best Comedy Feature	BlackBerry	Nominated	
Astra Film and Creative Arts Awards	January 6, 2024	Best Supporting Actor	Glenn Howerton	Nominated	
Astra Film and Creative Arts Awards	January 6, 2024	Game Changer Award	Glenn Howerton	Won	
Vancouver Film Critics Circle	February 12, 2024	Best Canadian Film	BlackBerry	Won	
Vancouver Film Critics Circle	February 12, 2024	Best Director of a Canadian Film	Matt Johnson	Won	
Vancouver Film Critics Circle	February 12, 2024	Best Male Actor in a Canadian Film	Jay Baruchel	Won	
Vancouver Film Critics Circle	February 12, 2024	Best Supporting Male Actor in a Canadian Film	Matt Johnson	Nominated	
Vancouver Film Critics Circle	February 12, 2024	Best Supporting Male Actor in a Canadian Film	Glenn Howerton	Won	
Vancouver Film Critics Circle	February 12, 2024	Best Screenplay for a Canadian Film	Matt Johnson and Matthew Miller	Won	
Independent Spirit Awards	February 25, 2024	Best Supporting Performance	Glenn Howerton	Nominated	
Toronto Film Critics Association	March 4, 2024	Outstanding Supporting Performance	Glenn Howerton	Runner-up (Note: Shared with Robert De Niro for Killers of the Flower Moon, Robert Downey Jr. for Oppenheimer, and Charles Melton for May December.)	
Toronto Film Critics Association	March 4, 2024	Outstanding Performance in a Canadian Film	Glenn Howerton	Won	
Toronto Film Critics Association	March 4, 2024	Outstanding Performance in a Canadian Film	Jay Baruchel	Runner-up (Note: Shared with Théodore Pellerin for Solo.)	
Toronto Film Critics Association	March 4, 2024	Rogers Best Canadian Film Award	Matt Johnson	Won	
Canadian Screen Awards	May 2024	Best Picture	Niv Fichman, Matthew Miller, Fraser Ash, Kevin Krikst	Won	
Canadian Screen Awards	May 2024	Best Direction	Matt Johnson	Won	
Canadian Screen Awards	May 2024	Best Lead Performance in a Comedy Film	Jay Baruchel	Won	
Canadian Screen Awards	May 2024	Best Supporting Performance in a Comedy Film	Glenn Howerton	Won	
Canadian Screen Awards	May 2024	Best Supporting Performance in a Comedy Film	Matt Johnson	Nominated	
Canadian Screen Awards	May 2024	Best Adapted Screenplay	Matt Johnson, Matthew Miller	Won	
Canadian Screen Awards	May 2024	Best Art Direction/Production Design	Adam Belanger, Kerry Noonan, Lucy Larkin	Won	
Canadian Screen Awards	May 2024	Best Cinematography	Jared Raab	Won	
Canadian Screen Awards	May 2024	Best Costume Design	Hanna Puley	Won	
Canadian Screen Awards	May 2024	Best Editing	Curt Lobb	Won	
Canadian Screen Awards	May 2024	Best Sound Editing	Matthew Chan, Gabe Knox, Michelle Irving, Lucas Prokaziuk, Stefan Fraticelli, Jason Charbonneau	Won	
Canadian Screen Awards	May 2024	Best Sound Mixing	Matthew Chan, Bret Killoran, Nathan Street, Paul Lynch, Randy Wilson, Ron Mellegers, Justin Helle	Won	
Canadian Screen Awards	May 2024	Best Original Score	Jay McCarrol	Won	
Canadian Screen Awards	May 2024	Best Makeup	Ashley Vieira, Erin Sweeney, Thea Samuels	Nominated	
Canadian Screen Awards	May 2024	Best Hair	Dylan Twigg, Philippe Bertrand-Hudon	Won	
Canadian Screen Awards	May 2024	Best Visual Effects	Tristan Zerafa, Lou Gatti, Matthew Nayman, Mike Boers	Nominated	
Canadian Screen Awards	May 2024	Best Casting in a Film	Pam Dixon, Jenny Lewis, Sara Kay	Won	

== See also ==
- Pirates of Silicon Valley
- The Social Network
- Tetris, a similar dramatization of the development of the eponymous video game
