= Vinessa Antoine =

Canadian television actress

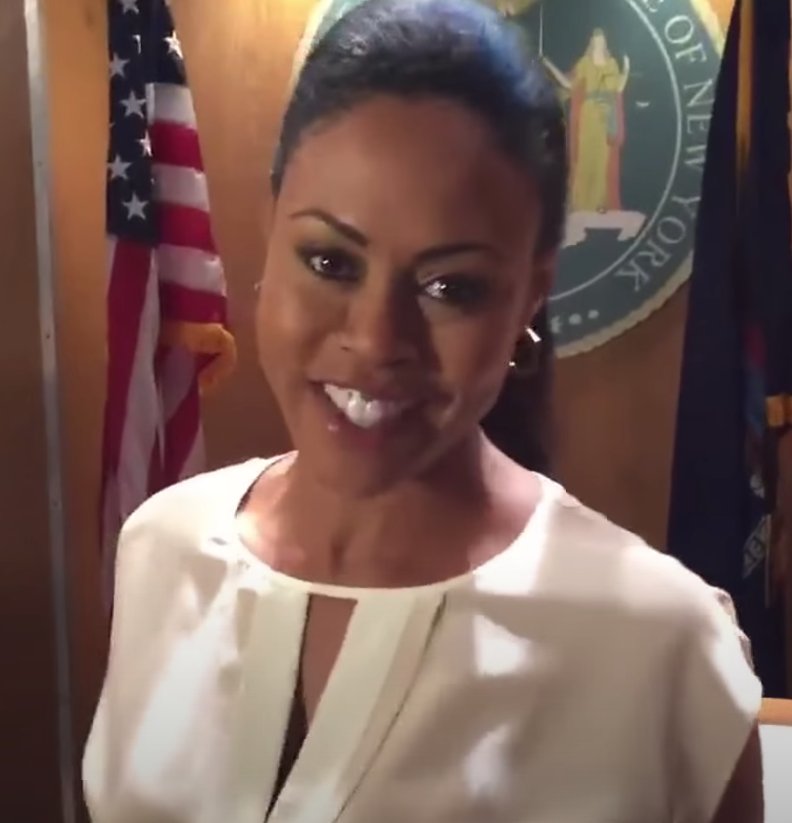
- Antoine in 2016
- Born: Vinessa Lynn Antoine; 1976 or 1977 (age 49–50); Toronto, Ontario, Canada
- Occupation: Actress
- Years active: 1995–present
- Children: 2

Vinessa Lynn Antoine (born c. 1976 or 1977) is a Canadian actress. She is best known for her roles as Judith Winters in the CBC comedy-drama series Being Erica (2009–11), Jordan Ashford in the ABC soap opera General Hospital (2014–18), and Marcie Diggs in the CBC legal drama series, Diggstown (2019–22).

== Early life ==
A native of Toronto, Ontario, Antoine grew up with her younger brother and parents in the suburbs of Toronto. She started studying classical ballet at age 4. At age 18, she was named top performer at the 1995 Black Achiever Awards and was picked to spend a year at the ballet company at Alvin Ailey American Dance Theater. She also toured with P. Diddy for six months. In her final year at Ailey, Antoine decided to focus her studies on acting. She is of Trinidadian and Middle Eastern descent.

== Career ==
Antoine made her film debut in the 1999 drama film Picture This starring Valerie Perrine and Michael Nouri. From 2001 to 2002, she had a recurring role in the Showtime drama series, Soul Food. Her other television credits including guest shots on The Unit and ReGenesis. She had recurring roles on Haven as Evidence "Evi" Ryan in 2011, and Heartland (2008–14). From 2009 to 2011 she regular cast member on the CBC comedy-drama series, Being Erica playing Judith Winters. She appeared in A Day Late and a Dollar Short, a Lifetime television movie starring Whoopi Goldberg in 2014. Later in 2014, Antoine joined the cast of ABC daytime soap opera, General Hospital as Jordan Ashford. On July 16, 2018, Antoine announced that she was leaving General Hospital.

In 2019, Antoine made history as a first Black Canadian woman to headline Canadian drama series playing lawyer Marcie Diggs in the CBC drama Diggstown. At the 9th Canadian Screen Awards in 2021, and at the 10th Canadian Screen Awards in 2022, she received a nomination for Best Actress in a Drama Series for Diggstown. The series ended in 2022, after fourth seasons. The following year, she had a recurring role in the Netflix comedy-drama series, Ginny & Georgia and starred opposite Amanda Seyfried in the drama film Seven Veils directed by Atom Egoyan. It will have its world premiere at the 2023 Toronto International Film Festival. She also co-starred in the climate change thriller film All the Lost Ones directed by Mackenzie Donaldson. In 2024, she starred in the CBC time-travel drama series, Plan B.

== Personal life ==
Antoine is a mother of two boys and lives in Los Angeles, California.

== Filmography ==
=== Film ===
Year	Title	Role	Notes
1996	Love Taps		Short film
1999	Picture This	Subletter	
2021	Kicking Blood	Vanessa	
2023	Seven Veils	Rachel	
2023	The Wall Street Boy (Kipkemboi)	Simba	
2024	All the Lost Ones	Penny	

=== Television ===
Year	Title	Role	Notes
1995	Annie O	Young Fan	Television film
2001–02	Soul Food	Monica	Recurring role, 3 episodes
2007	The Unit	Tribal Daughter	Episode: "The Outsiders"
2008	ReGenesis	Jamila Thompson	Episode: "Bloodless"
2008–14	Heartland	Nicole	Recurring role, 7 episodes
2009–11	Being Erica	Judith Winter	Series regular, 40 episodes
2011	Haven	Evidence 'Evi' Ryan	Recurring role, 9 episodes
2014–18	General Hospital	Jordan Ashford	Series regular
2014	A Day Late and a Dollar Short	Donetta	Television film
2018	NCIS	Sarah Willis	Episode: "Keep Your Friends Close"
2019–2022	Diggstown	Marcie Diggs	Series lead, 26 episodes ACTRA Award for Outstanding Performance (2021); ACTRA Award for Outstanding Female Actor in a Leading Role (2020); Screen Nova Scotia Award for Outstanding Female Actor in a Leading Role (2020); Screen Nova Scotia Award for Outstanding Performance (2020); Nominated — Canadian Screen Award for Best Actress in a Continuing Leading Dramatic Role (2021, 2022); Nominated — ACTRA Award for Outstanding Performance (2022)
2019	The Resident	Lea Jordan	Episode: "If Not Now, When?"
2019	Hudson & Rex	Allison Daniels	Episode: "Trial and Error"
2020	Interrogation	Sandy	Recurring role, 3 episodes
2023	Ginny & Georgia	Simone	Recurring role, 4 episodes
2023–2024	So Help Me Todd	Alex	Recurring role, 4 episodes
2024	Plan B	Mia Coleman	Series regular, 6 episodes
2024	Grey's Anatomy	Skye Williams	Recurring role
