= Detroit Film Critics Society Award for Best Use of Music =

Annual US film award

This is the list of annual winners of the Detroit Film Critics Society Award for Best Use of Music

== 2010s ==
Sources:

- 2017:Baby Driver
  - Blade Runner 2049
  - Good Time
  - Phantom Thread
  - The Shape of Water
- 2018:A Star Is Born
  - Bohemian Rhapsody
  - Green Book
  - Mandy
  - Mary Poppins Returns
- 2019:Once Upon a Time in Hollywood
  - 1917
  - Rocketman
  - Uncut Gems
  - Wild Rose

== 2020s ==
Sources:

- 2020:Sound of Metal
  - News of the World
  - Possessor
  - Soul
  - Tenet

== See also ==
- Academy Award for Best Original Score
