= Mark McGann (decorator) =

Mark McGann is a Canadian film and television set decorator. He is most noted for his work on the 2023 film Seven Veils, for which he, Phillip Barker and Adriana Bogaard received a Canadian Screen Award nomination for Best Art Direction or Production Design at the 13th Canadian Screen Awards in 2025.

He worked in Canadian film and television in the 1990s and 2000s, before leaving the industry and moving to St. John's, Newfoundland and Labrador, where he and his wife Kelly Mansell opened the Rocket bakery and café. He returned to working in set decoration in the 2020s, working on the television series Hudson & Rex.
