= Kevin Krikst =

Kevin Krikst is a Canadian film and television producer, associated with Rhombus Media. He is most noted as a producer of the 2023 film BlackBerry, which won the Canadian Screen Award for Best Picture at the 12th Canadian Screen Awards in 2024.

His other credits have included the films Closet Monster, Paseo, Disappearance at Clifton Hill, Possessor, Seven Veils and Honey Bunch, and the television series The North Water.

In 2019 Krikst and his producing partner Fraser Ash won the Kevin Tierney Emerging Producer Award from the Canadian Media Producers Association.
