= Jean Hegland =

American novelist (born 1956)

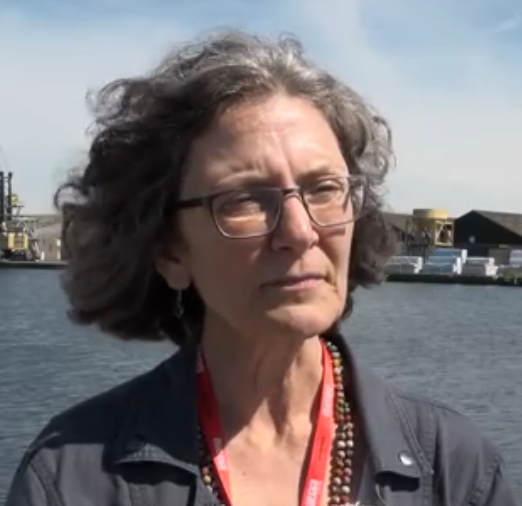
- In a 2017 interview
- Born: November 1956 (age 69); Pullman, Washington, U.S.
- Education: Fairhaven College; Washington State University (BA); Eastern Washington University (MA)
- Occupation: Novelist
- Website: jean-hegland.com

Jean Hegland (born November 1956) is an American novelist.

== Early life and education ==
She was born and raised in Pullman, Washington, near the Washington/Idaho state line. Her mother taught high school and college level English, and was the Pullman High School librarian for many years, and her father was a professor of English at Washington State University.

Hegland began college at Fairhaven College in Bellingham, Washington, and received her BA in Liberal Arts from Washington State University in 1979. In 1984, after working at a variety of jobs—from making stained glass windows for local businesses to housekeeping at a nursing home—she received a MA in Rhetoric and the Teaching of Composition from Eastern Washington University.

== Novels ==
Hegland's first novel, Into the Forest, was first published as a paperback by the nonprofit press CALYX and later as a hardbound from Bantam Books, which purchased the rights from CALYX. Into the Forest is a coming-of-age story about the relationship between two sisters as the technologically dependent society they were born into disintegrates and they attempt to survive alone in the redwood forest of northern California. Into the Forest was a New York Times Independent Bookstore bestseller, and has been translated into eleven languages. A new French translation was issued by Gallmeister in 2017 to much acclaim. A feature film adaptation of Into the Forest starring Elliot Page and Evan Rachel Wood premiered at the Toronto International Film Festival in 2015.

Hegland's second novel, Windfalls (Atria/Simon & Schuster, 2004, Washington Square Press 2005) explores the value of work, art and family ties, as well as the bond between women and their children.

Hegland's third novel, Still Time, is about a Shakespearean scholar who falls victim to Alzheimer's and struggles to come to terms with his estranged daughter, using the only tools that remain within his reach—his understanding of and love for Shakespeare's late plays.

Hegland's most recent novel, Here in This Next New Now, is the sequel to Into the Forest.

== List of works ==
- Into the Forest (novel) New York: Bantam Books, 1997. ISBN 9780553106688
- Windfalls (novel) New York: Atria Books, 2004. ISBN 9780743470070
- Still Time (novel) New York: Arcade, 2015. ISBN 9781628725797
