= Pop-Up Porno =

- Directed by: Stephen Dunn
- Release date: January 23, 2015 (Sundance)
- Running time: 3 minutes
- Country: Canada
- Language: English

Pop-Up Porno is a series of short films and a web series, directed by Canadian filmmaker Stephen Dunn and released in 2015. Each film in the series features a narrator relating their own story of an embarrassing online dating experience, as a pair of hands turns the pages through an illustrated pop-up book of the story.

== Background ==
The series comprises three films: "m4f", "f4m" and "m4m". The films premiered at the 2015 Sundance Film Festival, before being released online as a web series. On the films' website, Dunn has also solicited submissions from viewers to send in stories to be used as possible future installments in the series.

== Accolades ==
The series garnered a Canadian Screen Award nomination at the 4th Canadian Screen Awards in 2016, in the category of Original Non-Fiction Program or Series for Digital Media.
