= Stephen Dunn (director) =

Canadian director, screenwriter, and producer

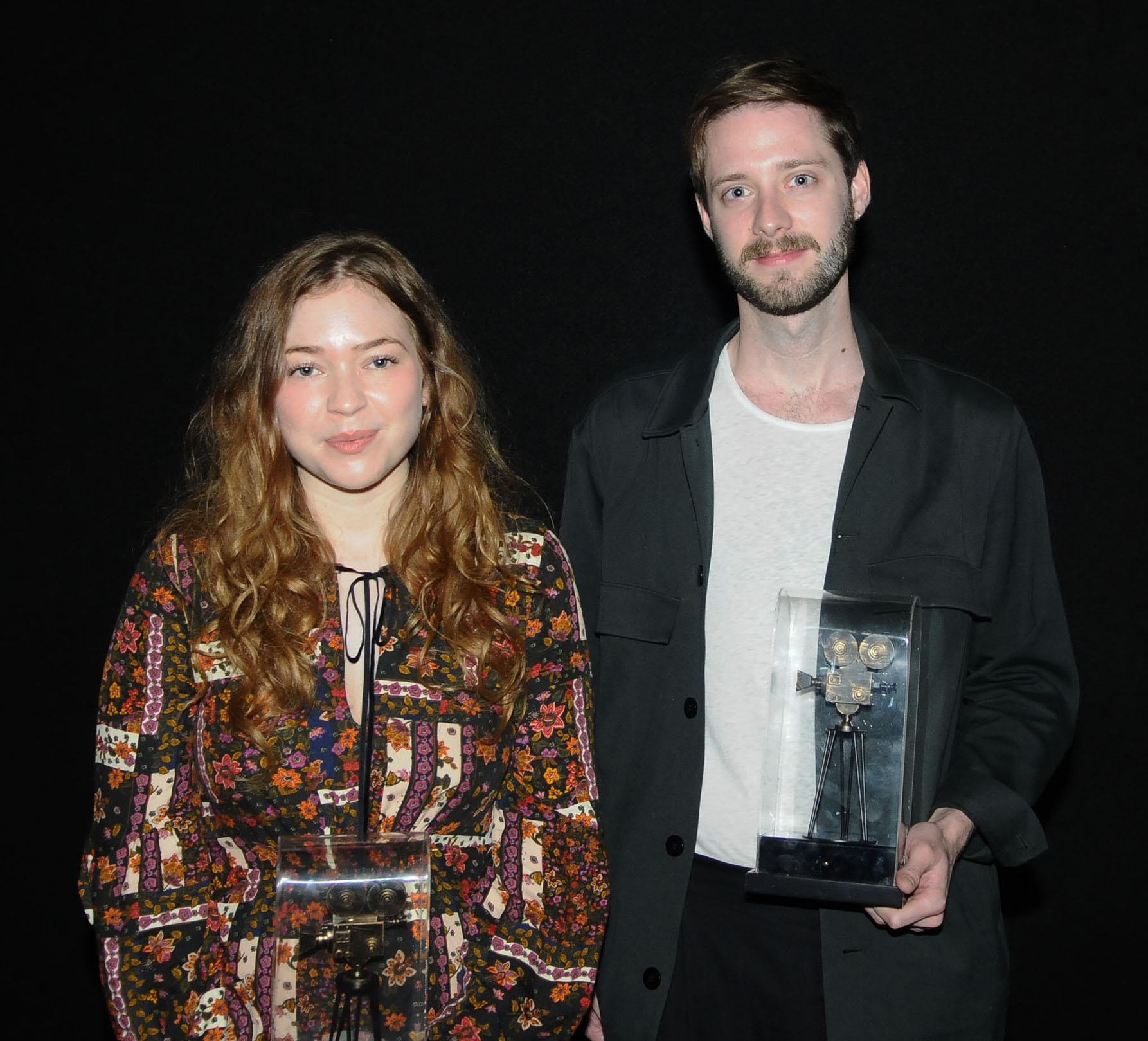
- Dunn at the IFFI in (2017)
- Born: January 18, 1989 (age 37); St. John's, Newfoundland and Labrador, Canada
- Occupations: Director; screenwriter; producer
- Years active: 2010–present
- Notable work: Closet Monster; Pop-Up Porno; Little America

Stephen Dunn (born January 18, 1989) is a Canadian director, screenwriter, and producer. He made his feature film directorial debut in 2015 with Closet Monster, which premiered at the Toronto International Film Festival.

== Early life ==
Dunn was born and raised in St. John's, Newfoundland and Labrador. He later studied at the Canadian Film Centre and at Ryerson University.

== Career ==
Dunn attended film school at Ryerson University in Toronto and produced several short films as a student, many of which screened at festivals. One of his early short films, titled Life Doesn't Frighten Me, starred Canadian actor Gordon Pinsent and won various awards, including the CBC Short Film Face-Off, with a cash prize of $30,000. The film also won awards at the Toronto Student Film Festival and the Tribeca Film Festival in 2013.

His other short films have included Lionel Lonely Heart, Words! Words! Words! and Swallowed.

=== Closet Monster ===
Dunn's feature film directorial debut, Closet Monster, won the award for Best Canadian Feature Film at the 2015 Toronto International Film Festival. He was also named the inaugural winner of the Len Blum Residency, a Toronto International Film Festival program for emerging directors.

=== Other work ===
Dunn directed and produced the web series Pop-Up Porno, which streams on YouTube and premiered at the Sundance Film Festival. He also directed "The Son", a 2020 episode of the Apple TV+ series Little America focusing on a gay immigrant from Syria, and has been writing a planned reboot of Queer as Folk.

== Personal life ==
In 2022, Dunn told the public that the new location for Queer as Folk is set in New Orleans because he wanted to give a tribute to his close drag queen superstar friend Chi Chi DeVayne, who is deceased. Dunn is also an openly gay man.

== Filmography ==
=== Film ===
Title	Year	Credited as			Notes
Title	Year	Director	Producer	Writer	Notes
Lionel Lonely Heart	2008	Yes	Yes	Yes	Short film Credited as Stephen Patrick Dunn
The Hall	2009	Yes	Co-producer	Yes	Short film Credited as Stephen Patrick Dunn
Words! Words! Words!	2009	Yes	Yes	Yes	Short film Cinematographer; Editor; Credited as Stephen Patrick Dunn
Swallowed	2010	Yes	Yes	Yes	Short film Lyrics by
Life Doesn't Frighten Me	2012	Yes	Co-producer	Yes	Short film Credited as Stephen Patrick Dunn
Night Light	2012	Yes	No	Story	Short film
We Wanted More	2013	Yes	No	Yes	Short film Credited as Stephen Patrick Dunn
Good Morning	2014	Co-director	No	No	Short film
The Imagined	2014	No	No	Yes	Short film Original author
Pop-Up Porno	2015	Yes	Co-producer	Yes	Documentary short film
Closet Monster	2015	Yes	No	Yes	

=== Television ===
The numbers in directing and writing credits refer to the number of episodes.

Title	Year	Credited as				Network	Notes
Title	Year	Creator	Director	Writer	Executive producer	Network	Notes
Reel East Coast	2015	No	Yes (1)	Yes (1)	No	CBC Television	Segment "Life Doesn't Frighten Me"
Heritage Minutes	2018	No	Yes (2)	Yes (2)	No	Historica Canada	Web series
Little America	2020	No	Yes (1)	Yes (1)	No	Apple TV+	
Queer as Folk	2022	Developer	Yes (3)	Yes (3)	Yes	Peacock	
Below	2022	No	Yes (1)	No	No	Netflix	
