= Rhombus Media =

Canadian film and television production company

- Industry: Film; television
- Founded: 1978, Toronto, Canada
- Founder: Barbara Willis Sweete; Niv Fichman
- Headquarters: Toronto, Canada
- Products: Media
- Website: rhombusmedia.com

Rhombus Media is a film and television production company formed in 1978 at the York University Film Department by Barbara Willis Sweete and Niv Fichman, and based in Toronto, Ontario, Canada. Larry Weinstein joined soon after. Rhombus Media developed a reputation for producing high-quality, lush art films focusing on music, theatre, and dance.

The company has received many national and international awards for their work, including several Emmys: one for Le Dortoir in 1990, one for Canadian Brass: Home Movies in 1992, and one win in 1993 for an episode of the Channel 4 Series Concerto, featuring Aaron Copland. They have also won numerous Genie Awards, including Best Motion Picture in 1993 for Thirty Two Short Films About Glenn Gould and for The Red Violin in 1999. The Red Violin also garnered an Oscar for best original score by John Corigliano in 2000.

Rhombus also produced the award-winning television series Slings & Arrows and Sensitive Skin.

In 2026, Rhombus was acquired by Skywild Pictures but will continue to operate as a distinct division of the company under Fichman's leadership.

== Films ==
- Zivjeli! To Life! (1982)
- All That Bach (1985)
- The Magnificat (1985)
- Blue Snake (1986)
- Ravel (1987)
- World Drums (1987)
- The Top of His Head (1989)
- A Moving Picture (1989)
- Carnival of Shadows (1989)
- For the Whales (1989)
- The Radical Romantic: John Weinzweig (1990)
- When the Fire Burns: The Life and Music of Manuel de Falla (1991)
- My War Years: Arnold Schoenberg (1992)
- Tectonic Plates (1992)
- Thirty Two Short Films About Glenn Gould (1993)
- Concierto de Aranjuez (1993)
- Great Performances: September Songs – The Music of Kurt Weill (1994)
- Satie and Suzanne (1994)
- Great Performances: Long Day's Journey into Night (1995)
- Solidarity Song: The Hanns Eisler Story (1995)
- A Tale of Tanglewood (1997)
- Hong Kong Symphony (1997)
- The War Symphonies: Shostakovich Against Stalin (1997)
- The Red Violin (1998)
- Last Night (1998)
- QSW: The Rebel Zone (2001)
- Ravel's Brain (2001)
- The Lanza Sessions (2001)
- Tuscan Skies ~ Andrea Bocelli (2001)
- Perfect Pie (2002)
- Stormy Weather: The Music of Harold Arlen (2002)
- An Idea of Canada (2003)
- The Firebird (2003)
- The Saddest Music in the World (2003)
- Childstar (2004)
- Elizabeth Rex (2004)
- Clean (2004)
- Burnt Toast (2005)
- Five Days in September: The Rebirth of an Orchestra (2005)
- Beethoven's Hair (2005)
- Glenn Gould: Hereafter (2006)
- Snow Cake (2006)
- Mozartballs (2006)
- Silk (2007)
- The Young Romantic (2008) (documentary about pianist Li Yundi)
- Passchendaele (2008)
- Blindness (2008)
- Inside Hana's Suitcase (2009)
- Gunless (2010)
- This Movie Is Broken (2010)
- Mulroney: The Opera (2011)
- Hobo with a Shotgun (2011)
- Antiviral (2012)
- Enemy (2013)
- Treading Water (2013)
- Our Man in Tehran (2013)
- Hyena Road (2015)
- Closet Monster (2015)
- Into the Forest (2015)
- Zoom (2015)
- Saigon Bodyguards (2016)
- The Devil's Horn (2016)
- The Man Who Invented Christmas (2017)
- Possessor (2020)
- Blackberry (2023)
- Seven Veils (2023)
- The Mother and the Bear (2024)
- Mile End Kicks (2025)

== Short films ==
- Music for Wilderness Lake (1980)
- Making Overtures: The Story of a Community Orchestra (1984)
- Inner Rhythm (1986)
- Eternal Earth (1987)
- Harry in Wonderland (1990)
- Noches on los jardines de Espana (1990)
- John Wyre: Drawing on Sound (1991)
- Nights in the Gardens of Spain (1992)
- Fanfares (1994)
- Legs Apart (2000)
- Toothpaste (2002)
- Burnt Toast: The Perfect Moment (2004)
- Burnt Toast: The Traffic Jam (2004)
- Burnt Toast: Choo-Choo and You Too (2005)
- Burnt Toast: The Argument (2005)
- The Devil's Delight (2010)
- The Lost Therapy Tapes (2011)
- Follow (2012)
- Method (2013)

== Television ==
- Bach Cello Suite (a.k.a. Yo-Yo Ma: Inspired by Bach (1997)
  - Bach Cello Suite #1: The Music Gallery
  - Bach Cello Suite #2: The Sound of Carceri
  - Bach Cello Suite #3: Falling Down Stairs
  - Bach Cello Suite #4: Sarabande
  - Bach Cello Suite #5: Struggle for Hope
  - Bach Cello Suite #6: Six Gestures
- Foreign Objects (TV series) | Foreign Objects (2000)
- Slings & Arrows (2003–2006)
- Michael: Tuesdays and Thursdays (2011)
- Sensitive Skin (2014–2015)
