= Niv Fichman =

Canadian film director and producer

- ניב פיכמן
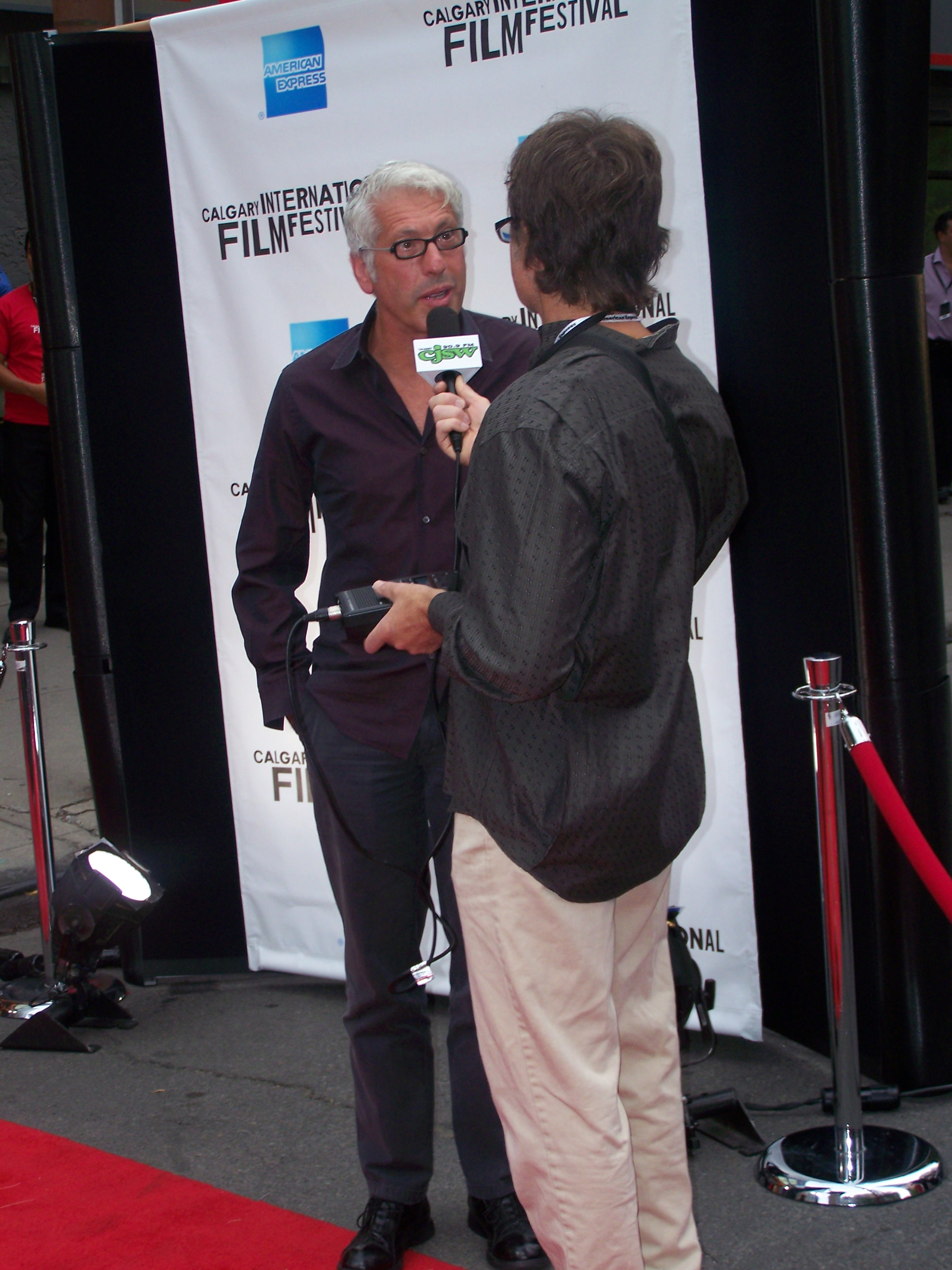
- Fichman being interviewed by a reporter with CJSW-FM at the 2008 Calgary International Film Festival opening gala showing of Blindness
- Born: ניב פיכמן; 1958 (age 67–68); Tel Aviv, Israel
- Occupations: Producer, director

Niv Fichman OC (Hebrew: ניב פיכמן; born 1958) is an Israeli-Canadian film producer, actor, and director. He has been a four-time winner of the Genie Award or the Canadian Screen Award for Canadian Screen Award for Best Motion Picture, winning at the 14th Genie Awards in 1993 as producer of Thirty Two Short Films About Glenn Gould, at the 19th Genie Awards in 1999 as producer of The Red Violin, at the 29th Genie Awards in 2009 for Passchendaele, and at the 12th Canadian Screen Awards in 2024 for BlackBerry.

Some of the other films he has produced include Blindness, Silk, Long Day's Journey into Night, 'and Hobo With a Shotgun.

In 2026, he was named as an Officer of the Order of Canada.

He lives in Toronto.
