= List of Canadian films of 2017 =

This is a list of Canadian films released in 2017:

Title	Director	Cast	Genre	Notes	Ref
Abu	Arshad Khan		Documentary		
Adam's Testament	Jason Barbeck, Rafael Kalamat	Luke Bilyk, Frank Chiesurin, Nick Mancuso	Thriller		
Adventures in Public School	Kyle Rideout	Judy Greer	Comedy	Premiered as Public Schooled before being retitled	
Afterwards (Après coup)	Noël Mitrani	Laurent Lucas, Natacha Mitrani	Drama		
All You Can Eat Buddha	Ian Lagarde	David La Haye, Richard Jutras, Ludovic Berthillot, Sylvio Arreola, Yaité Ruiz, Alexander Guerrero			
Allure	Carlos Sanchez and Jason Sanchez	Evan Rachel Wood	Thriller	Premiered as A Worthy Companion before being retitled	
The Argument (with annotations)	Daniel Cockburn	Clare Coulter	Experimental	master's thesis	
Ava	Sadaf Foroughi				
Babe, I Hate to Go	Andrew Moir	Delroy Dunkley	Documentary		
Badsville	April Mullen		Drama		
Baggage (Bagages)	Paul Tom		Documentary		
Barefoot at Dawn (Pieds nus dans l'aube)	Francis Leclerc				
Beatriz at Dinner	Miguel Arteta	Salma Hayek, Chloë Sevigny, Connie Britton	Comedy		
Before Anything You Say	Shelagh Carter	Kristen Harris, Darcy Fehr, John Bluethner, Toni Reimer, Graham Ashmore	Experimental domestic drama	Directors Guild of Canada, Best Manitoban Director	
A Better Man	Attiya Khan; Lawrence Jackman		Documentary		
Bickford Park	Dane Clark and Linsey Stewart				
Bird	Molly Parker				
Birth of a Family	Tasha Hubbard	Journalist Betty Ann Adam and her three siblings	Documentary	Explores consequences of Canada's Sixties Scoop	
Black Cop	Cory Bowles	Ronnie Rowe	Crime drama		
Black Kite	Tarique Qayumi				
Bon Cop, Bad Cop 2	Alain DesRochers	Colm Feore, Patrick Huard	Comedy, crime	Sequel to 2006 film Bon Cop, Bad Cop	
Bonfires	Martin Bureau		Documentary		
Boost	Darren Curtis	Nabil Rajo, Jahmil French, Oluniké Adeliyi	Drama		
The Breadwinner	Nora Twomey	Saara Chaudry, Soma Chhaya, Laara Sadiq, Shaista Latif, Ali Badshah, Kawa Ada, Noorin Gulamgaus, Kane Mahon	Animated		
Broken	Lynne Spencer		Documentary		
Broken Mile	Justin McConnell		Thriller		
Brown Girl Begins	Sharon Lewis	Mouna Traoré, Nigel Shawn Williams, Shakura S'Aida, Rachael Crawford, Measha Brueggergosman	Science fiction		
Canada in a Day	Trish Dolman		Documentary		
Cardinals	Grayson Moore and Aidan Shipley	Sheila McCarthy, Katie Boland, Grace Glowicki, Noah Reid, Peter MacNeill, Peter Spence	Thriller		
The Carter Effect	Sean Menard		Documentary		
The Catch	Holly Brace-Lavoie	Charli Birdgenaw	Short drama		
Charles	Dominic Étienne Simard				
Charming	Ross Venokur		Animated		
Cielo	Alison McAlpine		Documentary		
Creatura Dada	Caroline Monnet				
Crème de menthe	Philippe David Gagné, Jean-Marc E. Roy				
The Crescent	Seth A. Smith	Danika Vandersteen, Woodrow Graves, Terrance Murray, Andrew Gillis, Britt Loder, Andrea Kenyon	Horror		
Cross My Heart (Les Rois mongols)	Luc Picard	Milya Corbeil-Gauvreau, Anthony Bouchard, Henri Richer-Picard, Alexis Guay, Clare Coulter	Drama		
The Crying Conch	Vincent Toi		Short drama		
The Curse of Buckout Road	Matthew Currie Holmes	Evan Ross, Henry Czerny, Dominique Provost-Chalkley, Colm Feore, Danny Glover	Horror		
Darken	Audrey Cummings	Paul Amos, Ari Millen, Oluniké Adeliyi	Sci-fi, horror		
The Devil's Share (La Part du diable)	Luc Bourdon		Documentary		
Dolls Don't Cry (Toutes les poupées ne pleurent pas)	Frédérick Tremblay		Animated short		
Dolphin Man (L'homme dauphin)	Lefteris Charitos		Documentary		
Don't Talk to Irene	Pat Mills	Michelle McLeod, Geena Davis, Anastasia Phillips, Scott Thompson, Bruce Gray	Comedy		
The Drawer Boy	Arturo Perez Torres, Aviva Armour-Ostroff	Stuart Hughes, Richard Clarkin, Jakob Ehman	Drama		
Dreaming of a Jewish Christmas	Larry Weinstein		Documentary		
The Drop In	Naledi Jackson	Mouna Traoré, Oluniké Adeliyi	Short drama		
Edging	Natty Zavitz	Shomari Downer, Paula Brancati, Parveen Kaur	Comedy		
Eye on Juliet	Kim Nguyen				
Fail to Appear	Antoine Bourges	Deragh Campbell	Drama		
Fake Tattoos (Les Faux tatouages)	Pascal Plante	Anthony Therrien, Rose-Marie Perreault	Drama		
Father and Guns 2 (De père en flic 2)	Émile Gaudreault	Michel Côté, Louis-José Houde, Karine Vanasse	Comedy		
Far Away Lands (Les Terres lointaines)	Félix Lamarche		Documentary		
Filth City	Andy King	Pat Thornton, Kenny Hotz	Comedy		
Flood	Amanda Strong		Animated short		
For Nonna Anna	Luis De Filippis	Maya Henry, Jacqueline Tarne	Short drama		
Galaxy of Horrors	Various	Various	Science fiction horror anthology film	International productions	
Garage at Night (Garage de soir)	Daniel Daigle	Guillaume Laurin, Ève Lemieux, Stéphane Messier, Antoine Pilon	Short drama		
Ginger Nation	Mitch Fillion	Shawn Hitchins	Documentary, stand-up comedy		
Goon: Last of the Enforcers	Jay Baruchel	Seann William Scott, Liev Schreiber, Elisha Cuthbert	Comedy, sports	Sequel to 2011 film Goon	
Grandmother	Trevor Mack				
Great Great Great	Adam Garnet Jones	Sarah Kolasky, Dan Beirne	Drama		
The Green Fog	Guy Maddin, Evan Johnson, Galen Johnson		Experimental		
Gregoire	Cody Bown	Jared Abrahamson, Morgan Taylor Campbell, Ben Cotton	Drama	Winner Best Canadian Narrative Feature – CIFF	
Heart of a Mountain	Parastoo Anoushahpour, Ryan Ferko and Faraz Anoushahpour				
The Heretics	Chad Archibald		Thriller		
The Hidden River (La rivière cachée)	Jean-François Lesage		Documentary		
Hochelaga, Land of Souls (Hochelaga terre des âmes)	François Girard	Raoul Max Trujillo, Tanaya Beatty, David La Haye	Historical drama		
Hollow in the Land	Scooter Corkle	Dianna Agron, Shawn Ashmore, Jared Abrahamson	Thriller		
homer b	Milos Mitrovic and Connor Sweeney				
An Imagined Conversation: Kanye West & Stephen Hawking	Sol Friedman		Documentary		
In the Waves	Jacquelyn Mills		Documentary		
Indian Horse	Stephen Campanelli	Forrest Goodluck, Michiel Huisman, Michael Murphy, Ajuawak Kapashesit	Drama	Adaptation of the novel by Richard Wagamese	
Infiltration (Le problème d'infiltration)	Robert Morin	Christian Bégin	Drama, thriller		
Innu Nikamu: Resist and Sing (Innu Nikamu: Chanter la résistance)	Kevin Bacon-Hervieux		Documentary		
It's the Heart That Dies Last (C'est le cœur qui meurt en dernier)	Alexis Durand-Brault	Gabriel Sabourin, Denise Filiatrault	Drama		
Kayak to Klemtu	Zoe Leigh Hopkins	Ta'Kaiya Blaney, Sonja Bennett, Evan Adams, Lorne Cardinal	Drama		
Kiss and Cry	Sean Cisterna	Sarah Fisher, Luke Bilyk	Drama		
Latched	Justin Harding and Rob Brunner				
The Little Girl Who Was Too Fond of Matches (La petite fille qui aimait trop les allumettes)	Simon Lavoie				
Lira's Forest	Connor Jessup				
A Little Wisdom	Yuqi Kang		Documentary		
Living Proof	Matt Embry				
Long Time Running	Jennifer Baichwal; Nicholas de Pencier	The Tragically Hip	Documentary		
Lost Solace	Chris Scheuerman		Science fiction		
Luk'Luk'I	Wayne Wapeemukwa			Best Canadian First Feature Film winner at the 2017 Toronto International Film Festival	
Maison du Bonheur	Sofia Bohdanowicz	Juliane Sellam	Documentary		
Major Junior (Junior Majeur)	Éric Tessier	Antoine Olivier Pilon, Rémi Goulet, Alice Morel-Michaud	Drama		
The Man Who Invented Christmas	Bharat Nalluri				
Manic	Kalina Bertin		Documentary		
Marguerite	Marianne Farley		Short drama		
Mary Goes Round	Molly McGlynn	Aya Cash, Aaron Poole	Drama		
Mass for Shut-Ins	Winston DeGiobbi	Charles William McKenzie, Joey Lee Maclean, Stephen Melanson	Drama		
Meditation Park	Mina Shum	Sandra Oh, Liane Balaban, Don McKellar	Drama		
Midnight Confession	Maxwell McCabe-Lokos				
Milk	Heather Young				
Miyubi	Felix Lajeunesse	Emily Bergl, P. J. Byrne Richard Riehle, Jeff Goldblum	Virtual reality comedy-drama		
Möbius	Sam Kuhn				
Modern Classic	J. M. B. Hunter		Comedy		
A Moon of Nickel and Ice (Sur la lune de nickel)	François Jacob		Documentary		
My Little Pony: The Movie	Jayson Thiessen		Animated		
My Mother's Letters (Les lettres de ma mère)	Serge Giguère		Documentary		
Never Steady, Never Still	Kathleen Hepburn	Shirley Henderson, Nicholas Campbell, Théodore Pellerin	Drama		
Nuuca	Michelle Latimer				
On My Way Out: The Secret Life of Nani and Popi	Brandon Gross, Skyler Gross	Ruth Blank, Roman Blank	Documentary		
Ordinary Days	Jordan Canning, Renuka Jeyapalan, Kris Booth	Jacqueline Byers, Michael Xavier, Richard Clarkin, Torri Higginson, Joris Jarsky	Drama		
Origami	Patrick Demers	François Arnaud	Science fiction thriller		
Oscillations	Ky Nam Le Duc		Drama		
The Other Rio (L'autre Rio)	Émilie B. Guérette		Documentary		
Our People Will Be Healed	Alanis Obomsawin		Documentary		
Palmerston Blvd.	Dan Browne				
A Paradise Too Far (Y’est où le paradis?)	Denis Langlois	Maxime Dumontier, Marine Johnson	Drama		
Porcupine Lake	Ingrid Veninger				
Pre-Drink	Marc-Antoine Lemire				
Prototype	Blake Williams				
Pyewacket	Adam MacDonald				
Ravenous (Les Affamés)	Robin Aubert		Horror drama	Best Canadian Film winner at the 2017 Toronto International Film Festival	
Rebels on Pointe	Bobbi Jo Hart	Les Ballets Trockadero de Monte Carlo	Documentary		
The Road Forward	Marie Clements	Michelle St. John, Cheri Maracle, Evan Adams	Musical documentary		
Room for Rent	Matthew Atkinson	Brett Gelman, Mark Little, Mark McKinney			
Rumble: The Indians Who Rocked the World	Catherine Bainbridge, Alfonso Maiorana	Charley Patton, Mildred Bailey, Link Wray, Jesse Ed Davis, Stevie Salas, Buffy Sainte-Marie, Robbie Robertson, Randy Castillo, Jimi Hendrix	Documentary		
Rupture	Yassmina Karajah				
Sashinka	Kristina Wagenbauer	Carla Turcotte, Natalia Dontcheva	Drama		
Scaffold	Kazik Radwanski				
Sebastian	James Fanizza	James Fanizza, Guifré Bantjes-Rafols, Alex House, Brian McCook	Drama		
Shadow Men (Nos hommes dans l'ouest)	Renée Blanchar		Documentary		
Shadow Nettes	Phillip Barker				
Silas	Hawa Essuman and Anjali Nayar				
A Skin So Soft (Ta peau si lisse)	Denis Côté				
Sly Cooper	Kevin Munroe		Animated		
Soggy Flakes	Heath Affolter, Jon Affolter, Nathan Affolter, Thomas Affolter	Peter New, Cole Howard	Animated		
Some of My Friends (Certains de mes amis)	Catherine Martin		Documentary		
SpnsorLand	Michèle Hozer		Documentary		
Stay, I Don't Want to Be Alone	Gabriel Savignac		Documentary		
Suck It Up	Jordan Canning		Drama		
Sundowners	Pavan Moondi	Phil Hanley, Tim Heidecker, Luke Lalonde, Cara Gee, Nicholas Thorburn	Comedy-drama		
Squat (Ailleurs)	Samuel Matteau	Noah Parker, Théodore Pellerin	Drama		
Sweet Virginia	Jamie M. Dagg	Jon Bernthal, Christopher Abbott, Imogen Poots	Thriller	US-Canada coproduction	
A Swingers Weekend	Jon E. Cohen	Mia Kirshner, Erin Karpluk, Jonas Chernick			
Tadoussac	Martin Laroche	Isabelle Blais, Isabelle Boivin, Serge Boulianne	Drama		
Take a Walk on the Wildside	Lisa Rideout	Documentary		Canadian Screen Award winner for Best Short Documentary in 2018	
The Tesla World Light	Matthew Rankin	Robert Vilar as Nikola Tesla	Short film	World premiere at Cannes Film Festival	
There Is a House Here	Alan Zweig	Lucie Idlout	Documentary		
The Things You Think I'm Thinking	Sherren Lee	Prince Amponsah, Jesse LaVercombe	Short drama		
This Is Our Cup (Ça sent la coupe)	Patrice Sauvé	Louis-José Houde, Émilie Bibeau, Julianne Côté	Comedy-drama		
Threads	Torill Kove		Animated short		
Threesome (Le Trip à trois)	Nicolas Monette	Mélissa Désormeaux-Poulin, Martin Matte	Sex comedy		
A Touch of Spring (Un printemps d'ailleurs)	Xiaodan He		Drama		
Touched	Karl R. Hearne	Hugh Thompson, Lola Flanery	Psychological thriller		
Transformer	Michael Del Monte	Janae Kroc	Documentary		
Trench 11	Leo Scherman	Rossif Sutherland, Robert Stadlober	Horror/War		
Unarmed Verses	Charles Officer		Documentary	Winner of Best Canadian Feature at Hot Docs	
Union Leader	Sanjay Patel	Rahul Bhat, Tillotama Shome	Drama	Canada-India coproduction	
Venus	Eisha Marjara	Debargo Sanyal, Jamie Mayers, Zena Darawalla, Pierre-Yves Cardinal, Amber Goldfarb, Gordon Warnecke	Comedy-drama		
Voices of Kidnapping (Voces del secuestro)	Ryan McKenna		Documentary		
Wall	Cam Christiansen		Animated documentary		
We Are the Others (Nous sommes les autres)					
We Forgot to Break Up	Chandler Levack	Jesse Todd, Cara Gee, Steven McCarthy, Mark Rendall	Drama	Adapted from the novel Heidegger Stairwell by Kayt Burgess	
Winter Claire (Claire l'hiver)	Sophie Bédard Marcotte	Sophie Bédard Marcotte, Samuel Brassard, Alexa-Jeanne Dubé, Micheline Lanctôt	Comedy		
Worst Case, We Get Married (Et au pire, on se mariera)	Léa Pool	Sophie Nélisse, Karine Vanasse, Jean-Simon Leduc	Drama		

== See also ==
- 2017 in Canada
- 2017 in Canadian television
