= 2017 Vancouver International Film Festival =

- Opening film: Meditation Park by Mina Shum
- Closing film: Wonderstruck by Todd Haynes
- Location: Vancouver, British Columbia, Canada
- Festival date: September 28–October 13, 2017

The 2017 Vancouver International Film Festival, the 36th event in the history of the Vancouver International Film Festival, was held from September 28 to October 13, 2017.

The festival's opening gala film was Mina Shum's Meditation Park, and its closing gala was Todd Haynes's Wonderstruck; during the festival, a special gala was also dedicated to Guy Maddin's film The Green Fog, with its score performed live in the theatre by the Kronos Quartet.

== Awards ==
Award winners were announced on October 13.

Award	Film	Filmmaker
People's Choice	Indian Horse	Stephen Campanelli
Most Popular Canadian Documentary	Shut Up and Say Something	Melanie Wood
Most Popular International Feature	Loving Vincent	Dorota Kobiela, Hugh Welchman
Most Popular International Documentary	Faces Places	Agnès Varda, JR
Best Canadian Film	Black Cop	Cory Bowles
Best Canadian Documentary	Unarmed Verses	Charles Officer
Best Canadian Short Film	Shadow Nettes	Phillip Barker
Emerging Canadian Director	Never Steady, Never Still	Kathleen Hepburn
Best BC Film	Luk'Luk'I	Wayne Wapeemukwa
Best BC Short Film	Rupture	Yassmina Karajah
Sea to Sky Award	Never Steady, Never Still	Kathleen Hepburn
BC Emerging Filmmaker	Never Steady, Never Still	Kathleen Hepburn
Most Promising Director of a Canadian Short Film	The Crying Conch	Vincent Toi
VIFF Impact Award	Blue	Karina Holden

== Films ==
=== Special Presentations ===
- Borg vs McEnroe — Janus Metz Pedersen
- Breathe — Andy Serkis
- Call Me by Your Name — Luca Guadagnino
- A Fantastic Woman (Una mujer fantástica) — Sebastián Lelio
- The Florida Project — Sean Baker
- Happy End — Michael Haneke
- The Killing of a Sacred Deer — Yorgos Lanthimos
- Loving Vincent — Dorota Kobiela, Hugh Welchman
- Mountain — Jennifer Peedom
- The Square — Ruben Östlund
- Top of the Lake: China Girl — Jane Campion, Ariel Kleiman

=== Contemporary World Cinema ===
- 7 Minutes — Michele Placido
- At the End of the Tunnel — Rodrigo Grande
- Azar — Mohammad Hamzei
- Beauty and the Dogs — Kaouther Ben Hania
- Bolshoi — Valery Todorovsky
- Casting — Nicolas Wackerbarth
- Cocote — Nelson Carlo de Los Santos Arias
- Columbus — Kogonada
- The Desert Bride — Cecilia Atán, Valeria Pivato
- Directions — Stephan Komandarev
- Disappearance — Boudewijn Koole
- The Divine Order — Petra Volpe
- The Dragon Defense — Natalia Santa
- Farewell (Abscheid von den Eltern) — Astrid Johanna Ofner
- Félicité — Alain Gomis
- Gabriel and the Mountain — Fellipe Gamarano Barbosa
- Garden Store: Family Friend — Jan Hřebejk
- God's Own Country — Francis Lee
- Golden Exits — Alex Ross Perry
- Good Manners (As Boas Maneiras) — Marco Dutra, Juliana Rojas
- Holy Air — Shady Srour
- Hotel Salvation (Mukti Bhawan) — Shubhashish Bhutiani
- Ice Mother (Bába z ledu) — Bohdan Sláma
- In the Fade — Fatih Akin
- The Insult — Ziad Doueiri
- The King's Choice (Kongens nei) — Erik Poppe
- Last Days in Havana (Últimos días en La Habana) — Fernando Pérez
- The Line — Peter Bebjak
- Lipstick Under My Burkha — Alankrita Shrivastava
- Loveless (Нелюбовь) — Andrey Zvyagintsev
- Lucky — John Carroll Lynch
- The Nest of the Turtledove (Гніздо горлиці) — Taras Tkachenko
- Newton — Amit V. Masurkar
- The Nile Hilton Incident — Tarik Saleh
- No Bed of Roses — Mostofa Sarwar Farooki
- No Date, No Signature (بدون تاریخ، بدون امضا) — Vahid Jalilvand
- On the Seventh Day (En el séptimo día) — Jim McKay
- The Other Side of Hope (Toivon tuolla puolen) — Aki Kaurismäki
- The Party — Sally Potter
- Los Perros — Marcela Said
- The Queen of Spain (La reina de España) — Fernando Trueba
- Reseba: The Dark Wind — Hussein Hassan
- Sami Blood (Sameblod) — Amanda Kernell
- Scary Mother (Sashishi Deda) — Ana Urushadze
- Sexy Durga — Sanal Kumar Sasidharan
- Son of Sofia (O gios tis Sofias) — Elina Psykou
- Sour Apples (Ekşi Elmalar) — Yılmaz Erdoğan
- Summer 1993 (Estiu 1993) — Carla Simón
- Swallows and Amazons — Philippa Lowthorpe
- Sweet Virginia — Jamie M. Dagg
- Tales of Mexico (La Habitación) — Natalia Beristáin, Carlos Bolado, Carlos Carrera, Ernesto Contreras, Daniel Giménez Cacho, Alfonso Pineda Ulloa, Alejandro Valle, Iván Ávila Dueñas
- Tehran Taboo (تهران تابو) — Ali Soozandeh
- Tenderness (La Tenerezza) — Gianni Amelio
- That Trip We Took with Dad (Die Reise mit Vater) — Anca Miruna Lăzărescu
- Thelma — Joachim Trier
- Thirst Street — Nathan Silver
- Tom of Finland — Dome Karukoski
- Vazante — Daniela Thomas
- Western — Valeska Grisebach
- Winter Brothers (Vinterbrødre) — Hlynur Pálmason
- The Wound (Inxeba) — John Trengove
- The Young Karl Marx — Raoul Peck

=== Spotlight on France ===
- Ava — Léa Mysius
- BPM (Beats per Minute) — Robin Campillo
- Dalida — Lisa Azuelos
- Django — Étienne Comar
- Faces Places — Agnès Varda, JR
- Ismael's Ghosts (Les Fantômes d'Ismaël) — Arnaud Desplechin
- Milla — Valérie Massadian
- A Season in France (Une Saison en France) — Mahamat Saleh Haroun
- The Valley of the Wolves (La Vallée des loups) — Jean-Michel Bertrand
- The Workshop (L'Atelier) — Laurent Cantet

=== Documentaries ===
- 24 Frames (۲۴ فریم) — Abbas Kiarostami
- AlphaGo — Greg Kohs
- Armed with Faith — Asad Faruqi, Geeta Gandbhir
- Bombshell: The Hedy Lamarr Story — Alexandra Dean
- Caniba — Véréna Paravel, Lucien Castaing-Taylor
- Did You Wonder Who Fired the Gun? — Travis Wilkerson
- Dina — Daniel Sickles, Antonio Santini
- Dirtbag: The Legend of Fred Beckey — Dave O'Leske
- The Farthest — Emer Reynolds
- Good Luck — Ben Russell
- Machines — Rahul Jain
- Maineland — Miao Wang
- A Marriage Story (Strnadovi) — Helena Třeštíková
- Searching for a New Science — David Malone
- Untitled — Michael Glawogger, Monika Willi
- West of the Jordan River — Amos Gitai

=== True North ===
- Black Cop — Cory Bowles
- Eye on Juliet — Kim Nguyen
- Fail to Appear — Antoine Bourges
- Fake Tattoos (Les faux tatouages) — Pascal Plante
- Forest Movie — Matthew Taylor Blais
- In the Waves — Jacquelyn Mills
- Infiltration (Le problème d’infiltration) — Robert Morin
- Like a Pebble in the Boot (Comme un caillou dans la botte) — Hélène Choquette
- Maison du Bonheur — Sofia Bohdanowicz
- Mass for Shut-Ins — Winston DeGiobbi
- Our People Will Be Healed — Alanis Obomsawin
- Prototype — Blake Williams
- Rebels on Pointe — Bobbi Jo Hart
- A Skin So Soft (Ta peau si lisse) — Denis Côté
- Still Night, Still Light (Mes nuits feront écho) — Sophie Goyette
- Suck It Up — Jordan Canning
- Unarmed Verses — Charles Officer
- Worst Case, We Get Married (Et on pire, on se mariera) — Léa Pool
- You're Soaking in It — Scott Harper

=== Gateway ===
- 2 Cool 2 Be 4gotten — Petersen Vargas
- Anarchist from Colony — Lee Joon-ik
- Angkor Awakens — Robert H. Lieberman
- Bad Genius — Nattawut Poonpiriya
- A Beautiful Star — Daihachi Yoshida
- Becoming Who I Was — Moon Chang-yong, Jeon Jin
- Burma Storybook — Petr Lom
- Claire's Camera — Hong Sang-soo
- Close-Knit — Naoko Ogigami
- The Departure — Lana Wilson
- Dragonfly Eyes — Xu Bing
- The First Lap — Kim Dae-hwan
- A Fish Out of Water — Lai Kuo-An
- The Foolish Bird — Huang Ji, Ryuji Otsuka
- The Great Buddha+ — Huang Ji, Ryuji Otsuka
- Gukoroku: Traces of Sin — Kei Ishikawa
- Have a Nice Day — Liu Jian
- The Hidden Sword — Xu Haofeng
- Honeygiver Among the Dogs — Dechen Roder
- I've Got the Blues — Angie Chen
- In Time to Come — Tan Pin Pin
- King of Peking — Sam Voutas
- The Last Roar of a Mother Bear — Doug Chan
- Marlina the Murderer in Four Acts — Mouly Surya
- Motherland — Ramona S. Diaz
- Okja — Bong Joon-ho
- Paradox — Wilson Yip
- Sweating the Small Stuff — Ryutaro Ninomiya

=== Sea to Sky ===
- Adventures in Public School — Kyle Rideout
- cə̓snaʔəm, the city before the city — Elle-Máijá Tailfeathers
- Dead Shack — Peter Ricq
- Entanglement — Jason James
- Gregoire — Cody Bown
- Hollow in the Land — Scooter Corkle
- Indian Horse — Stephen Campanelli
- Luk'Luk'I — Wayne Wapeemukwa
- Meet Beau Dick: Maker of Monsters — LaTiesha Fazakas, Natalia Tudge
- Never Steady, Never Still — Kathleen Hepburn
- On Putin's Blacklist — Boris Ivanov
- Once There Was a Winter — Ana Valine
- Shut Up and Say Something — Melanie Wood

=== Impact ===
- ACORN and the Firestorm — Reuben Atlas, Sam Pollard
- Blue — Karina Holden
- Evolution of Organic — Mark Kitchell
- Frank Serpico — Antonino D'Ambrosio
- Hondros — Greg Campbell
- Human Flow — Ai Weiwei
- Keep Talking — Karen Lynn Weinberg
- The Trial: The State of Russia vs Oleg Sentsov — Askold Kurov
- The Venerable W — Barbet Schroeder
- A Yangtze Landscape — Chang Jiang

=== M/A/D ===
- Beuys: Art as a Weapon — Andres Veiel
- Big Time — Kaspar Astrup Schröder
- Bosch: The Garden of Dreams (El Bosco, el jardin de los sueños) — José Luis López Linares
- Bunch of Kunst — Christine Franz
- Chaplin in Bali: Journey to the East — Raphaël Millet
- Chavela — Catherine Gund, Daresha Kyi
- Clive Davis: The Soundtrack of Our Lives — Chris Perkel
- David Hockney at the Royal Academy of Arts — Phil Grabsky
- Leaning Into the Wind: Andy Goldsworthy — Thomas Riedelsheimer
- Louise Lecavalier in Motion — Raymond St-Jean
- Planeta Petrila — Andrei Dascalescu
- Schumann's Bar Talks — Marieke Schroeder
- Shadowman — Oren Jacoby
- Song of Granite — Pat Collins
- Streetscapes (Dialogue) — Heinz Emigholz
- Where You're Meant to Be — Paul Fegan

=== Altered States ===
- Animals (Tiere) — Greg Zglinski
- Bad Day for the Cut — Chris Baugh
- Bitch — Marianna Palka
- The Crescent — Seth A. Smith
- The Endless — Justin Benson, Aaron Moorhead
- Friendly Beast (O Animal Cordial) — Gabriela Amaral Almeida
- Housewife — Can Evrenol
- Lowlife — Ryan Prows
- Tiger Girl — Jakob Lass
- Tragedy Girls — Tyler MacIntyre

=== Canadian Short Films ===
- Alice Ayalik — Reel Youth
- Anne Doll — Levi Marshall
- Bickford Park — Linsey Stewart, Dane Clark
- Bird — Molly Parker
- Birdlime — Evan Derushie
- Bunbun Blast — Drake Tuura
- Cherry Cola — Joseph Amenta
- Crème de menthe — Jean-Marc E. Roy, Philippe David Gagné
- The Crying Conch — Vincent Toi
- Do We Leave This Here — Julia Hutchings
- Etymology — Faith Paré
- Fence — Alexis Fortier Gauthier
- Flood — Amanda Strong
- From Here To — Darynn Bednarczyk
- Full Moon Party — Gabriel Adelman
- The Glow Is Gone — Ryan Ermacora
- Go Play Outside (Va jouer dehors) — Adib Alkhalidey
- The Good Fight — Mintie Pardoe
- Grandmother (ʔEtsu) — Trevor Mack
- His Name Is Willy — Liz Cairns
- Idizwadidiz — Isiah Medina
- It Just Might Be True — Evan McDermot, Samantha Campbell
- The Knits — Lisa Birke
- Let Your Heart Be Light — Deragh Campbell, Sophy Romvari
- Life Goes On: John Dub — Moe Yang
- Lights Beneath My Feet — Laz
- Lira's Forest — Connor Jessup
- Lost Paradise Lost — Yan Giroux
- Lower Plenty Garden Views — Adrian St. Louis
- Manivald — Chintis Lundgren
- The Martyr — Devan Scott, Will Ross
- Memory of the Peace — Jennifer Chiu, Jean Parsons
- Milk — Heather Young
- The Mountain of SGaana — Christopher Auchter
- La Pesca — Pablo Alvarez-Mesa, Fernando López Escrivá
- Refugee Rescue — Richard Yang
- Rupture — Yassmina Karajah
- Scaffold — Kazik Radwanski
- Scratchy — Marv Newland
- Sea Monster — Daniel Rocque, Kassandra Tomczyk
- Shadow Nettes — Phillip Barker
- Slap Happy — Madeleine Sims-Fewer, Dusty Mancinelli
- The Tesla World Light — Matthew Rankin
- There Lived the Colliers — Nelson MacDonald
- Thug — Daniel Boos
- Voices of Kidnapping — Ryan McKenna
- When Food Goes Bad — Ben Sprenger
- Where Do Cats Go After 9 Lives? — Marion Duhaime
- A Woman on the Telephone: Carol — Erica Généreux Smith

=== International Short Films ===
- 100 Second Red Light — Navid Zare
- Afterglow — Akira Kamiki
- American Psychosis — Amanda Zackem
- The Animal — Atasay Koç
- Backstory — Joschka Laukeninks
- Ballooinator — Joshua Siegel
- Bullroarer — Francesco Saviano
- C.O.D. — Onur Dogan
- Canton Novelty — Fang Lu
- Chasing Stars — Markus Eichenberger
- Damn Bro! — Travis Frick
- Divide — Alysha Si, Jamil Ur Rehman,Rabbia Arshad
- Don't Be Afraid of the Light — Jason A. Rostovsky
- The Fashion Show — Lucy Lumsden
- Flag — Matan Ben Moreh
- Forever Now — Kristian Haskjold
- Game — Jeannie Donohoe
- The Good Girls — Clara Roquet
- High Moon — David Zhu
- Home, Sweet Home — Carlos Polo
- Hsiang Yi — Wu Zi En
- Hunger — Alejandro Montalvo
- I Love You Forever Now — Youyang Yu
- Images of Nowhere — Rubén Guzmán
- Invisible Line — Shahnawaz Chachar, Sourath Behan, Danial Shah
- The Kodachrome Elegies — Jay Rosenblatt
- Land of Happy Dreams — Josh Auter
- The Language of Ball — Ramon Rodriguez
- Life Is Lifeless — Hawar Rahimi
- Lunar Dial — Gao Yuan
- Marlon — Jessica Palud
- Maxwell's Demon — Marcos Vaz
- Munchies — Sinéad Stoddart
- Nobody Likes You — Mark Sean Haynes, Kelly Wydryk
- Outlines — Ellie Rogers
- Overlove — Lucas Helth
- Promise — Neville Pierce
- Rhythm of Being — Giada Ghiringhelli
- Royal Fool — Saba Karseladze
- Say No to Early Sex — Alusine Kamara, Susan Kargbo, Ibrahim Kamara, Mariama Kargbo
- Shepherd's Purse — Dong Hao
- Sissyman — Joshua Atesh Little
- Sisters — Toni Kamula
- Talking Too Loud — Abel Rubinstein, Georgia Milton
- There Was a Man, a Girl and a Rocket — Terence Chim
- 7ún3l — Klych López
- TV in the Fish Tail — Iesh Thapar
- Walk of Shame — Maisie Buck
- Walt & Me — Yaz Canli
- Wardrobe — Pranav Bhasin
- Wave — Benjamin Cleary, T.J. O'Grady Peyton
- We Belong — Jeremy Herron
- Who Is in Charge Here? — Studio Da
- Yes, God, Yes — Karen Maine

=== Modes ===
- 489 Years — Hayoun Kwon
- Batrachian's Ballad — Leonor Teles
- Charged Landscapes — Sara Naomi Goodman
- Find Fix Finish — Sylvain Cruiziat, Mila Zhluktenko
- Green Screen Gringo — Douwe Dijkstra
- Jardins d'été — Quayola
- Martin Cries — Jonathan Vinel
- A Photo of Me — Dennis Tupicoff
- Roadside Attraction — Iveta Lucas, Patrick Bresnan
- Strange Says the Angel — Shalimar Preuss
- Studies on the Ecology of Drama — Eija-Liisa Ahtila
- A Tall Tale — Maya Schweizer
- Tashlikh (Cast Off) — Yael Bartana
