= Vancouver Film Critics Circle Awards 2017 =

Annual Canadian film awards ceremony

The nominations for the 18th Vancouver Film Critics Circle Awards, honoring the best in filmmaking in 2017, were announced on December 15, 2017. Lady Bird led with five nominations, followed by Phantom Thread with four.

The winners were announced on December 18, 2017. Lady Bird won three awards, including Best Film.

== Winners and nominees ==
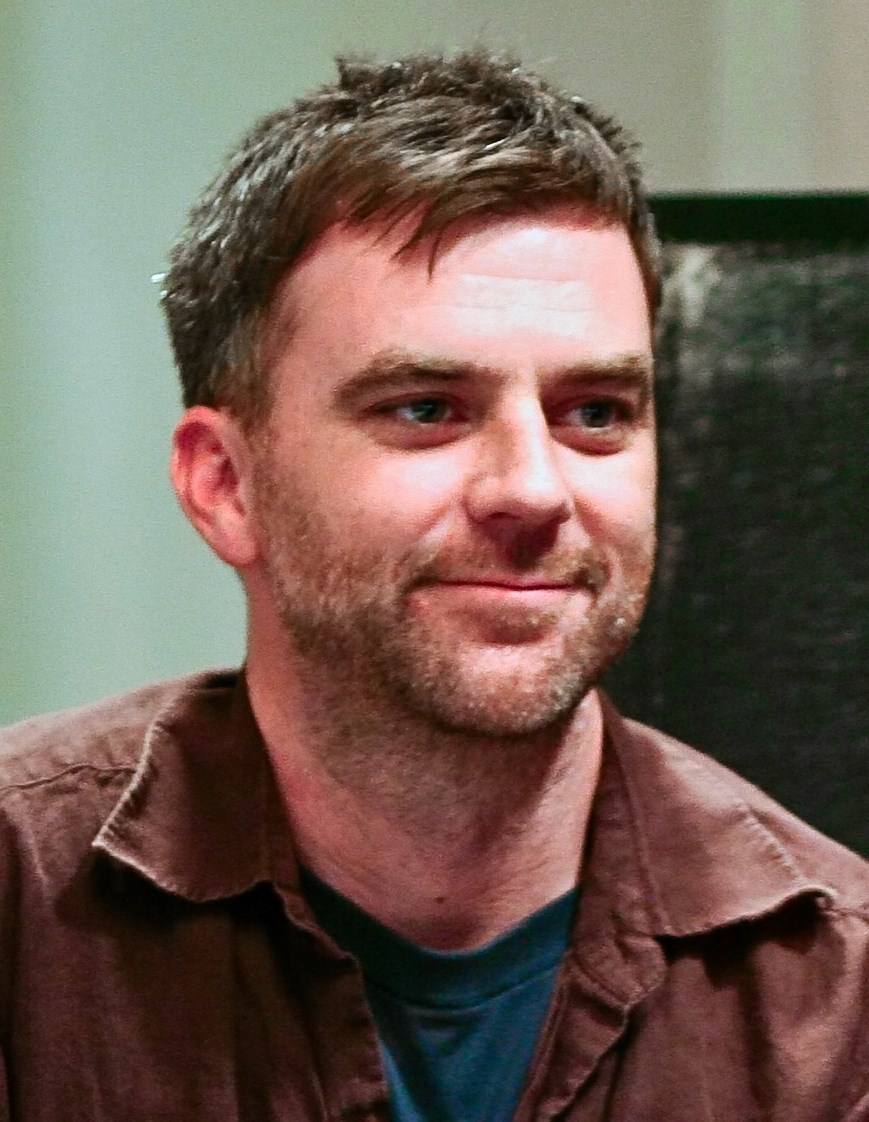
Paul Thomas Anderson, Best Director winner

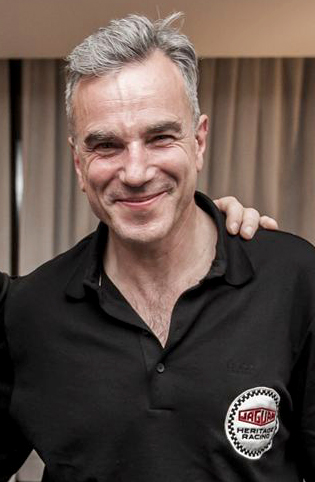
Daniel Day-Lewis, Best Actor winner

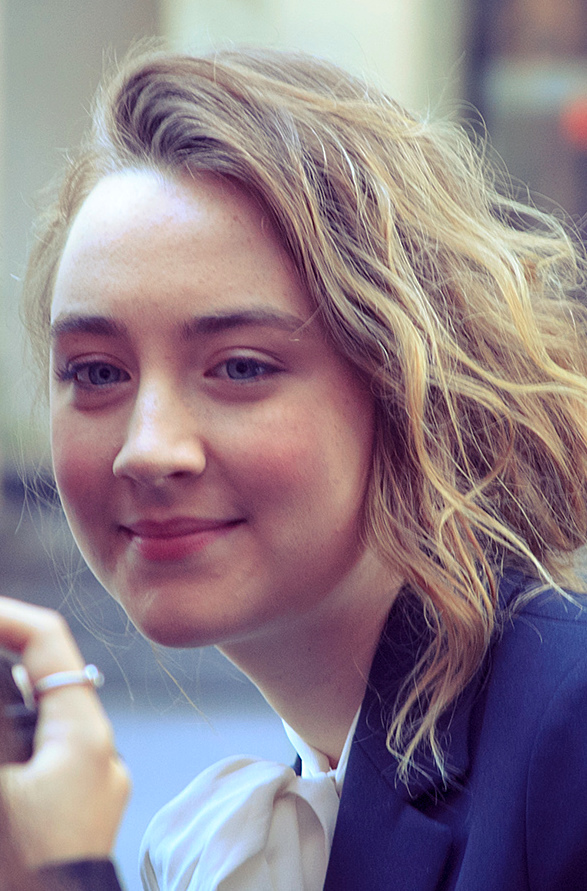
Saoirse Ronan, Best Actress winner

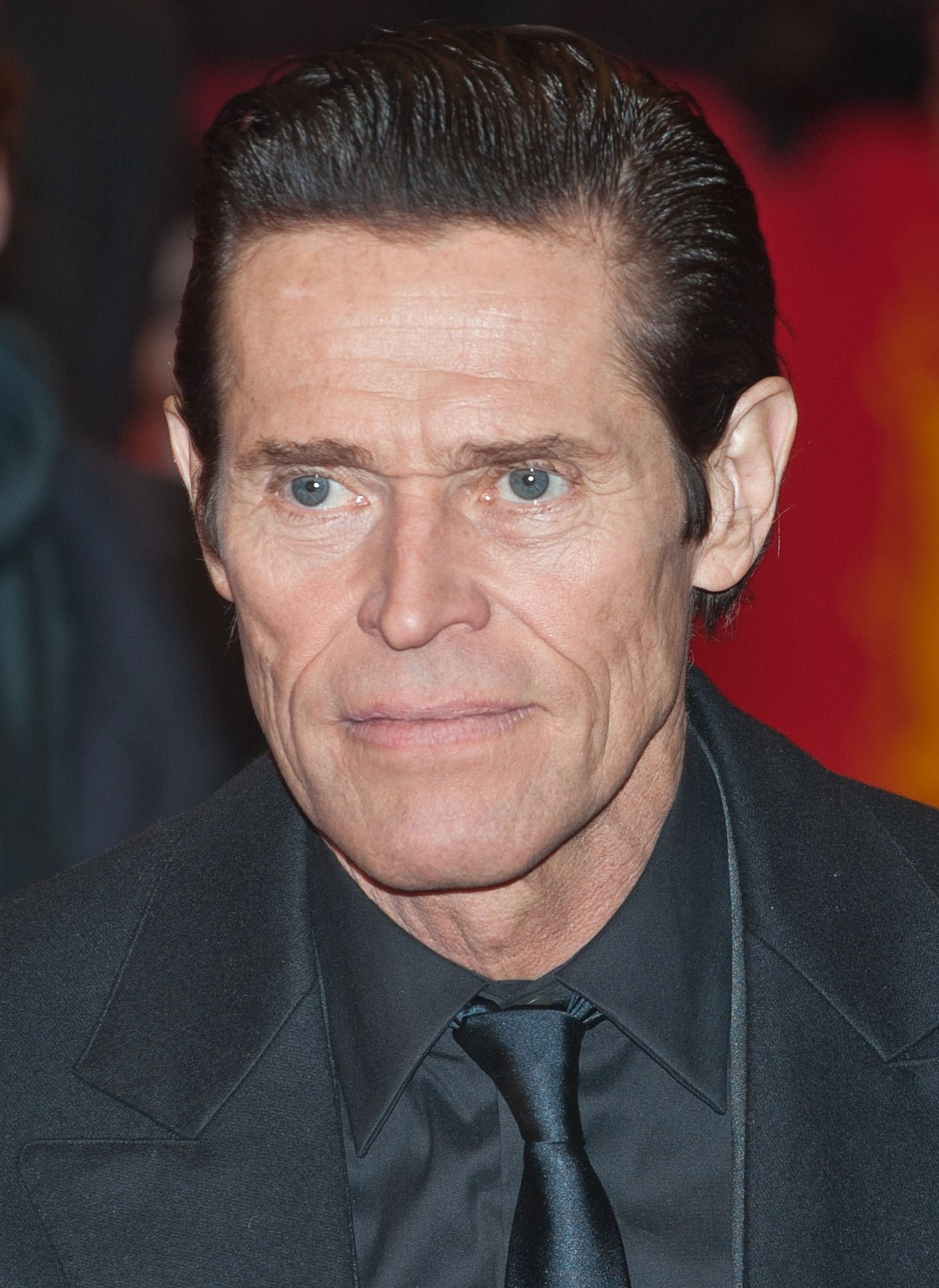
Willem Dafoe, Best Supporting Actor winner

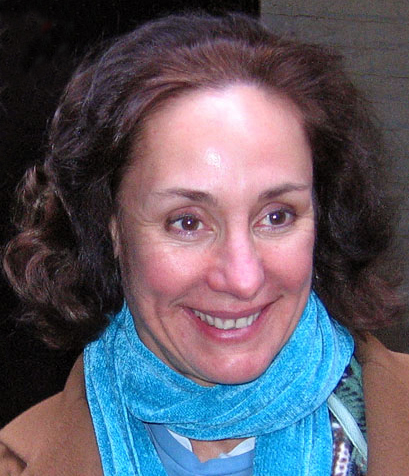
Laurie Metcalf, Best Supporting Actress winner

=== International ===
Best Film

- Lady Bird
- Dunkirk
- Phantom Thread

Best Director

- Paul Thomas Anderson – Phantom Thread
- Greta Gerwig – Lady Bird
- Christopher Nolan – Dunkirk

Best Actor

- Daniel Day-Lewis – Phantom Thread
- Timothée Chalamet – Call Me by Your Name
- Gary Oldman – Darkest Hour

Best Actress

- Saoirse Ronan – Lady Bird
- Sally Hawkins – The Shape of Water
- Frances McDormand – Three Billboards Outside Ebbing, Missouri

Best Supporting Actor

- Willem Dafoe – The Florida Project
- Armie Hammer – Call Me by Your Name
- Sam Rockwell – Three Billboards Outside Ebbing, Missouri

Best Supporting Actress

- Laurie Metcalf – Lady Bird
- Allison Janney – I, Tonya
- Lesley Manville – Phantom Thread

Best Screenplay

- Jordan Peele – Get Out
- Greta Gerwig – Lady Bird
- Martin McDonagh – Three Billboards Outside Ebbing, Missouri

Best Foreign-Language Film

- BPM (Beats per Minute)
- A Fantastic Woman
- The Square

Best Documentary

- Ex Libris: The New York Public Library
- Faces Places
- Jane

=== Canadian ===
Best Canadian Film

- Never Steady, Never Still
- Black Cop
- Fail to Appear

Best Director of a Canadian Film

- Kathleen Hepburn – Never Steady, Never Still
- Sofia Bohdanowicz – Maison du Bonheur
- Denis Côté – A Skin So Soft

Best Actor in a Canadian Film

- Ronnie Rowe – Black Cop
- Jared Abrahamson – Gregoire
- Anthony Therrien – Fake Tattoos

Best Actress in a Canadian Film

- Shirley Henderson – Never Steady, Never Still
- Deragh Campbell – Fail to Appear
- Rose-Marie Perreault – Fake Tattoos

Best Supporting Actor in a Canadian Film

- Ben Cotton – Gregoire
- Joe Buffalo – Luk'Luk'I
- Nathan Roder – Fail to Appear

Best Supporting Actress in a Canadian Film

- Morgan Taylor Campbell – Gregoire
- Grace Glowicki – Cardinals
- Yaité Ruiz – All You Can Eat Buddha

Best Screenplay of a Canadian Film

- Pascal Plante – Fake Tattoos
- Cody Bown – Gregoire
- Kathleen Hepburn – Never Steady, Never Still

Best Canadian Documentary

- Maison du Bonheur — Sofia Bohdanowicz
- In the Waves — Jacquelyn Mills
- A Skin So Soft — Denis Côté
- Unarmed Verses — Charles Officer

One to Watch

- Cody Bown – Gregoire
- Winston DeGiobbi – Mass for Shut-Ins
- Seth A. Smith – The Crescent

Best British Columbia Film

- Never Steady, Never Still
- Gregoire
- Luk'Luk'I
- The Road Forward
