= Canada's Top Ten =

Film chart in Canada

Canada's Top Ten is an annual honour, compiled by the Toronto International Film Festival to identify and promote the year's best Canadian films. The list was first introduced in 2001 as an initiative to help publicize Canadian films. Formerly announced in December each year, the list is now announced in early January of the following year.

The list is determined by tabulating votes from film festival programmers and film critics across Canada. Films must have premiered, either in general theatrical release or on the film festival circuit, within the calendar year; although TIFF organizes the vote, films do not have to have been screened specifically at TIFF to be eligible.

Originally, only a single list of 10 films was released. Although both short and feature films were eligible, the list was dominated primarily by feature films. Accordingly, in 2007 TIFF expanded the program, instituting separate Top Ten lists for feature films and short films. However, both lists remain inclusive of both narrative fiction and documentary films.

In a 2022 article, Barry Hertz of The Globe and Mail praised the program as a diverse overview of the creative risk-taking in Canadian cinema, and a worthwhile contrast to the limited scope of conventional commercial film distribution. Conversely, in 2025, Pat Mullen of Point of View criticized the program for seemingly ignoring documentary films, with only one feature and two short documentaries highlighted in that year's list.

== Screening series ==
Each year's list was formerly screened as a Canada's Top Ten minifestival, held in January of the following year. Prior to 2010, the films were screened at the Art Gallery of Ontario's Jackman Theatre as part of TIFF's Cinematheque Ontario program; following the opening of the TIFF Bell Lightbox in 2010, the festival was staged at that venue thereafter. For the 2014 festival, TIFF introduced a People's Choice Award for the feature film program, modeled on the existing Toronto International Film Festival People's Choice Award and conducted in the same manner.

In 2018, TIFF dropped the January festival, instead introducing a new model in which each film receives its own standalone theatrical run at the Lightbox in the following year. They subsequently dropped this model, and returned to screening the honored films at a dedicated Canada's Top Ten screening series in the winter programming season, although the series has not reintroduced a People's Choice award as of 2024.

== Other activities ==
In 2024, following the death of influential Canadian film director Charles Officer in fall 2023, TIFF and the Canadian Broadcasting Corporation also announced the creation of the Charles Officer Legacy Award, to be presented at the Canada's Top Ten reception to an emerging filmmaker whose body of work is reflective of Officer's values, artistry and vision.

Once per decade, TIFF also polls Canadian film critics and festival programmers to determine a list of the Top 10 Canadian Films of All Time, separately from the annual Canada's Top Ten survey.

== Unified list (2000–2006) ==
Year	Film	Director	Ref
2001	Atanarjuat: The Fast Runner	Zacharias Kunuk	
2001	Ginger Snaps	John Fawcett	
2001	The Heart of the World	Guy Maddin	
2001	Khaled	Asghar Massombagi	
2001	Last Wedding	Bruce Sweeney	
2001	Marriages (Mariages)	Catherine Martin	
2001	Parsley Days	Andrea Dorfman	
2001	Soft Shell Man (Un crabe dans la tête)	André Turpin	
2001	The Woman Who Drinks (La femme qui boit)	Bernard Émond	
2001	The Uncles	James Allodi	
2002	Ararat	Atom Egoyan	
2002	Chaos and Desire (La Turbulence des fluides)	Manon Briand	
2002	Dracula: Pages from a Virgin's Diary	Guy Maddin	
2002	Flower and Garnet	Keith Behrman	
2002	Gambling, Gods and LSD	Peter Mettler	
2002	Marion Bridge	Wiebke von Carolsfeld	
2002	The Negro (Le Nèg')	Robert Morin	
2002	Ocean (Océan)	Catherine Martin	
2002	Spider	David Cronenberg	
2002	Tom	Mike Hoolboom	
2003	8:17 p.m. Darling Street (20h17 rue Darling)	Bernard Émond	
2003	The Barbarian Invasions (Les Invasion barbares)	Denys Arcand	
2003	The Corporation	Mark Achbar, Jennifer Abbott	
2003	Dying at Grace	Allan King	
2003	Falling Angels	Scott Smith	
2003	Far Side of the Moon (La Face cachée de la lune)	Robert Lepage	
2003	Love, Sex and Eating the Bones	Sudz Sutherland	
2003	My Life Without Me	Isabel Coixet	
2003	On the Corner	Nathaniel Geary	
2003	The Saddest Music in the World	Guy Maddin	
2004	Childstar	Don McKellar	
2004	The Five of Us (Elles étaient cinq)	Ghyslaine Côté	
2004	I, Claudia	Chris Abraham	
2004	It's All Gone Pete Tong	Michael Dowse	
2004	Ryan	Chris Landreth	
2004	Saint Ralph	Michael McGowan	
2004	Scared Sacred	Velcrow Ripper	
2004	Shake Hands with the Devil: The Journey of Roméo Dallaire	Peter Raymont	
2004	What Remains of Us (Ce qu'il reste de nous)	François Prévost, Hugo Latulippe	
2004	White Skin (La Peau blanche)	Daniel Roby	
2005	C.R.A.Z.Y.	Jean-Marc Vallée	
2005	Dodging the Clock (Horloge biologique)	Ricardo Trogi	
2005	Familia	Louise Archambault	
2005	A History of Violence	David Cronenberg	
2005	The Life and Hard Times of Guy Terrifico	Michael Mabbott	
2005	Memory for Max, Claire, Ida and Company	Allan King	
2005	The Novena (La Neuvaine)	Bernard Émond	
2005	A Simple Curve	Aubrey Nealon	
2005	Water	Deepa Mehta	
2005	Where the Truth Lies	Atom Egoyan	
2006	Away from Her	Sarah Polley	
2006	Congorama	Philippe Falardeau	
2006	The Journals of Knud Rasmussen	Zacharias Kunuk, Norman Cohn	
2006	Manufactured Landscapes	Jennifer Baichwal	
2006	Monkey Warfare	Reginald Harkema	
2006	On the Trail of Igor Rizzi (Sur la trace d'Igor Rizzi)	Noël Mitrani	
2006	Radiant City	Gary Burns, Jim Brown	
2006	Sharkwater	Rob Stewart	
2006	A Sunday in Kigali (Un dimanche à Kigali)	Robert Favreau	
2006	Trailer Park Boys: The Movie	Mike Clattenburg	

== Feature films (2007–present) ==
=== 2000s ===
Year	Film	Director	Ref
2007	Amal	Richie Mehta	
2007	Continental, a Film Without Guns (Continental, un film sans fusil)	Stéphane Lafleur	
2007	Days of Darkness (L'Âge des ténèbres)	Denys Arcand	
2007	Eastern Promises	David Cronenberg	
2007	Fugitive Pieces	Jeremy Podeswa	
2007	My Winnipeg	Guy Maddin	
2007	A Promise to the Dead: The Exile Journey of Ariel Dorfman	Peter Raymont	
2007	The Tracey Fragments	Bruce McDonald	
2007	Up the Yangtze	Yung Chang	
2007	Young People Fucking	Martin Gero	
2008	Adoration	Atom Egoyan	
2008	Before Tomorrow (Le jour avant le lendemain)	Marie-Hélène Cousineau, Madeline Ivalu	
2008	Fifty Dead Men Walking	Kari Skogland	
2008	Heaven on Earth	Deepa Mehta	
2008	It's Not Me, I Swear! (C'est pas moi, je le jure)	Philippe Falardeau	
2008	Lost Song	Rodrigue Jean	
2008	Mommy Is at the Hairdresser's (Maman est chez le coiffeur)	Léa Pool	
2008	The Memories of Angels (La Memoire des anges)	Luc Bourdon	
2008	The Necessities of Life (Ce qu'il faut pour vivre)	Benoît Pilon	
2008	Pontypool	Bruce McDonald	
2009	Cairo Time	Ruba Nadda	
2009	Carcasses	Denis Côté	
2009	Crackie	Sherry White	
2009	Defendor	Peter Stebbings	
2009	I Killed My Mother (J'ai tué ma mère)	Xavier Dolan	
2009	The Legacy (La Donation)	Bernard Émond	
2009	Passenger Side	Matt Bissonnette	
2009	Polytechnique	Denis Villeneuve	
2009	The Trotsky	Jacob Tierney	
2009	The Wild Hunt	Alexandre Franchi	

=== 2010s ===
Films highlighted in yellow below were the winners of the People's Choice award at the Canada's Top Ten minifestival.

Year	Film	Director	Ref
2010	Barney's Version	Richard J. Lewis	
2010	Curling	Denis Côté	
2010	Heartbeats (Les Amours imaginaires)	Xavier Dolan	
2010	The High Cost of Living	Deborah Chow	
2010	Incendies	Denis Villeneuve	
2010	Last Train Home	Lixin Fan	
2010	Modra	Ingrid Veninger	
2010	Mourning for Anna (Trois temps après la mort d'Anna)	Catherine Martin	
2010	Splice	Vincenzo Natali	
2010	Trigger	Bruce McDonald	
2011	Café de Flore	Jean-Marc Vallée	
2011	Citizen Gangster	Nathan Morlando	
2011	A Dangerous Method	David Cronenberg	
2011	Hobo With a Shotgun	Jason Eisener	
2011	Keyhole	Guy Maddin	
2011	Monsieur Lazhar	Philippe Falardeau	
2011	The Salesman (Le Vendeur)	Sébastien Pilote	
2011	Starbuck	Ken Scott	
2011	Take This Waltz	Sarah Polley	
2011	Wetlands (Marécages)	Guy Édoin	
2012	Cosmopolis	David Cronenberg	
2012	The End of Time	Peter Mettler	
2012	Goon	Michael Dowse	
2012	Laurence Anyways	Xavier Dolan	
2012	Midnight's Children	Deepa Mehta	
2012	My Awkward Sexual Adventure	Sean Garrity	
2012	Still Mine	Michael McGowan	
2012	Stories We Tell	Sarah Polley	
2012	War Witch (Rebelle)	Kim Nguyen	
2012	The World Before Her	Nisha Pahuja	
2013	Asphalt Watches	Shayne Ehman, Seth Scriver	
2013	Enemy	Denis Villeneuve	
2013	The F Word	Michael Dowse	
2013	Gabrielle	Louise Archambault	
2013	Rhymes for Young Ghouls	Jeff Barnaby	
2013	Sarah Prefers to Run (Sarah préfère la course)	Chloé Robichaud	
2013	Tom at the Farm (Tom à la ferme)	Xavier Dolan	
2013	Vic and Flo Saw a Bear (Vic et Flo ont vu un ours)	Denis Côté	
2013	Watermark	Jennifer Baichwal, Edward Burtynsky	
2013	When Jews Were Funny	Alan Zweig	
2014	Monsoon	Sturla Gunnarsson	
2014	Corbo	Mathieu Denis	
2014	Felix and Meira (Félix et Meira)	Maxime Giroux	
2014	In Her Place	Albert Shin	
2014	Maps to the Stars	David Cronenberg	
2014	Mommy	Xavier Dolan	
2014	The Price We Pay	Harold Crooks	
2014	Sol	Marie-Hélène Cousineau, Susan Avingaq	
2014	Violent	Andrew Huculiak	
2014	You're Sleeping Nicole (Tu dors Nicole)	Stéphane Lafleur	
2015	My Internship in Canada (Guibord s'en va-t-en guerre)	Philippe Falardeau	
2015	Closet Monster	Stephen Dunn	
2015	The Demons (Les Démons)	Philippe Lesage	
2015	The Forbidden Room	Guy Maddin, Evan Johnson	
2015	Guantanamo's Child: Omar Khadr	Patrick Reed, Michelle Shephard	
2015	Hurt	Alan Zweig	
2015	Into the Forest	Patricia Rozema	
2015	Ninth Floor	Mina Shum	
2015	Our Loved Ones (Les êtres chers)	Anne Émond	
2015	Sleeping Giant	Andrew Cividino	
2016	Angry Inuk	Alethea Arnaquq-Baril	
2016	Hello Destroyer	Kevan Funk	
2016	It's Only the End of the World (Juste la fin du monde)	Xavier Dolan	
2016	Mean Dreams	Nathan Morlando	
2016	Nelly	Anne Émond	
2016	Old Stone	Johnny Ma	
2016	Searchers (Maliglutit)	Zacharias Kunuk, Natar Ungalaaq	
2016	Those Who Make Revolution Halfway Only Dig Their Own Graves (Ceux qui font les révolutions à moitié n'ont fait que se creuser un tombeau)	Mathieu Denis, Simon Lavoie	
2016	Werewolf	Ashley McKenzie	
2016	Window Horses	Ann Marie Fleming	
2017	Unarmed Verses	Charles Officer	
2017	Adventures in Public School	Kyle Rideout	
2017	Allure	Carlos Sanchez, Jason Sanchez	
2017	Ava	Sadaf Foroughi	
2017	The Little Girl Who Was Too Fond of Matches (La petite fille qui aimait trop les allumettes)	Simon Lavoie	
2017	Luk'Luk'I	Wayne Wapeemukwa	
2017	Never Steady, Never Still	Kathleen Hepburn	
2017	Our People Will Be Healed	Alanis Obomsawin	
2017	Ravenous (Les Affamés)	Robin Aubert	
2017	Rumble: The Indians Who Rocked the World	Alfonso Maiorana, Catherine Bainbridge	
2018	Anthropocene: The Human Epoch	Jennifer Baichwal, Nicholas de Pencier, Edward Burtynsky	
2018	Edge of the Knife	Gwaai Edenshaw, Helen Haig-Brown	
2018	Firecrackers	Jasmin Mozaffari	
2018	The Fireflies Are Gone (La disparition des lucioles)	Sébastien Pilote	
2018	Freaks	Zach Lipovsky, Adam Stein	
2018	Genesis (Genèse)	Philippe Lesage	
2018	Giant Little Ones	Keith Behrman	
2018	Mouthpiece	Patricia Rozema	
2018	Roads in February (Les routes en février)	Katherine Jerkovic	
2018	What Walaa Wants	Christy Garland	
2019	And the Birds Rained Down (Il pleuvait des oiseaux)	Louise Archambault	
2019	Anne at 13,000 Ft.	Kazik Radwanski	
2019	Antigone	Sophie Deraspe	
2019	Black Conflux	Nicole Dorsey	
2019	The Body Remembers When the World Broke Open	Elle-Máijá Tailfeathers, Kathleen Hepburn	
2019	Matthias & Maxime	Xavier Dolan	
2019	Murmur	Heather Young	
2019	One Day in the Life of Noah Piugattuk	Zacharias Kunuk	
2019	The Twentieth Century	Matthew Rankin	
2019	White Lie	Calvin Thomas, Yonah Lewis	

=== 2020s ===
Year	Film	Director	Ref
2020	Beans	Tracey Deer	
2020	Fauna	Nicolás Pereda	
2020	Funny Boy	Deepa Mehta	
2020	Inconvenient Indian	Michelle Latimer	
2020	Judy Versus Capitalism	Mike Hoolboom	
2020	The Kid Detective	Evan Morgan	
2020	Nadia, Butterfly	Pascal Plante	
2020	The Nest	Sean Durkin	
2020	No Ordinary Man	Chase Joynt, Aisling Chin-Yee	
2020	Possessor	Brandon Cronenberg	
2021	All My Puny Sorrows	Michael McGowan	
2021	Charlotte	Éric Warin, Tahir Rana	
2021	Drunken Birds (Les oiseaux ivres)	Ivan Grbovic	
2021	Learn to Swim	Thyrone Tommy	
2021	Night Raiders	Danis Goulet	
2021	Maria Chapdelaine	Sébastien Pilote	
2021	Scarborough	Shasha Nakhai, Rich Williamson	
2021	Ste. Anne	Rhayne Vermette	
2021	Subjects of Desire	Jennifer Holness	
2021	The White Fortress	Igor Drljača	
2022	Black Ice	Hubert Davis	
2022	Brother	Clement Virgo	
2022	Crimes of the Future	David Cronenberg	
2022	I Like Movies	Chandler Levack	
2022	Riceboy Sleeps	Anthony Shim	
2022	Rosie	Gail Maurice	
2022	Something You Said Last Night	Luis De Filippis	
2022	This House (Cette maison)	Miryam Charles	
2022	To Kill a Tiger	Nisha Pahuja	
2022	Viking	Stéphane Lafleur	
2023	BlackBerry	Matt Johnson	
2023	Hey, Viktor!	Cody Lightning	
2023	Humanist Vampire Seeking Consenting Suicidal Person (Vampire humaniste cherche suicidaire consentant)	Ariane Louis-Seize	
2023	Kanaval	Henri Pardo	
2023	The Queen of My Dreams	Fawzia Mirza	
2023	Seagrass	Meredith Hama-Brown	
2023	Seven Veils	Atom Egoyan	
2023	Solo	Sophie Dupuis	
2023	Someone Lives Here	Zack Russell	
2023	Tautuktavuk (What We See)	Carol Kunnuk, Lucy Tulugarjuk	
2024	40 Acres	R. T. Thorne	
2024	Any Other Way: The Jackie Shane Story	Michael Mabbott, Lucah Rosenberg-Lee	
2024	Can I Get a Witness?	Ann Marie Fleming	
2024	Matt and Mara	Kazik Radwanski	
2024	Paying for It	Sook-Yin Lee	
2024	Rumours	Guy Maddin, Evan Johnson, Galen Johnson	
2024	Seeds	Kaniehtiio Horn	
2024	Shepherds (Bergers)	Sophie Deraspe	
2024	The Shrouds	David Cronenberg	
2024	Universal Language	Matthew Rankin	
2025	Agatha's Almanac	Amalie Atkins	
2025	At the Place of Ghosts (Sk+te'kmujue'katik)	Bretten Hannam	
2025	Blue Heron	Sophy Romvari	
2025	Follies (Folichonneries)	Eric K. Boulianne	
2025	Mile End Kicks	Chandler Levack	
2025	Nirvanna the Band the Show the Movie	Matt Johnson	
2025	Space Cadet	Kid Koala	
2025	The Things You Kill	Alireza Khatami	
2025	Tuner	Daniel Roher	
2025	Wrong Husband (Uiksaringtara)	Zacharias Kunuk	

== Short films (2007–present) ==
=== 2000s ===
Year	Film	Director	Ref
2007	Code 13	Mathieu Denis	
2007	The Colony	Jeff Barnaby	
2007	Dust Bowl Ha! Ha!	Sébastien Pilote	
2007	Farmer's Requiem	Ramses Madina	
2007	I Have Seen the Future	Cam Christiansen	
2007	I Met the Walrus	Josh Raskin	
2007	Madame Tutli-Putli	Chris Lavis, Maciek Szczerbowski	
2007	Pool	Chris Chong Chan Fui	
2007	The Schoolyard (Les Grands)	Chloé Leriche	
2007	Terminus	Trevor Cawood	
2008	Beyond the Walls (La Battue)	Guy Édoin	
2008	Block B	Chris Chong Chan Fui	
2008	Drux Flux	Theodore Ushev	
2008	Ghosts and Gravel Roads	Mike Rollo	
2008	Green Door	Semi Chellas	
2008	My Name Is Victor Gazon (Mon nom est Victor Gazon)	Patrick Gazé	
2008	Next Floor	Denis Villeneuve	
2008	Nikamowin (Song)	Kevin Lee Burton	
2008	Passages	Marie-Josée Saint-Pierre	
2008	Princess Margaret Blvd.	Kazik Radwanski	
2009	The Armoire	Jamie Travis	
2009	The Cave	Helen Haig-Brown	
2009	Danse Macabre	Pedro Pires	
2009	Five Hole: Tales of Hockey Erotica	Cam Christiansen	
2009	Life Begins (La Vie commence)	Émile Proulx-Cloutier	
2009	Naissances	Anne Émond	
2009	Out in That Deep Blue Sea	Kazik Radwanski	
2009	Runaway	Cordell Barker	
2009	The Spine	Chris Landreth	
2009	Vive la rose	Bruce Alcock	

=== 2010s ===
Year	Film	Director	Ref
2010	Above the Knee	Greg Atkins	
2010	I Was a Child of Holocaust Survivors	Ann Marie Fleming	
2010	The Legend of Beaver Dam	Jerome Sable	
2010	Lipsett Diaries	Theodore Ushev	
2010	Little Flowers (Les Fleurs de l'âge)	Vincent Biron	
2010	The Little White Cloud That Cried	Guy Maddin	
2010	Marius Borodine	Emanuel Hoss-Desmarais	
2010	Mokhtar	Halima Ouardiri	
2010	On the Way to the Sea	Tao Gu	
2010	Vapor	Kaveh Nabatian	
2011	Choke	Michelle Latimer	
2011	Doubles with Slight Pepper	Ian Harnarine	
2011	The Fuse: Or How I Burned Simon Bolivar	Igor Drljaca	
2011	Hope	Pedro Pires	
2011	No Words Came Down	Ryan Flowers, Lisa Pham	
2011	Ora	Philippe Baylaucq	
2011	Rhonda's Party	Ashley McKenzie	
2011	La Ronde	Sophie Goyette	
2011	Trotteur	Arnaud Brisebois, Francis Leclerc	
2011	We Ate the Children Last	Andrew Cividino	
2012	Bydlo	Patrick Bouchard	
2012	Crackin' Down Hard	Mike Clattenburg	
2012	Herd Leader (Chef de meute)	Chloé Robichaud	
2012	Kaspar	Diane Obomsawin	
2012	Keep a Modest Head (Ne crâne pas sois modeste)	Deco Dawson	
2012	Lingo	Bahar Noorizadeh	
2012	Malody	Phillip Barker	
2012	Old Growth	Tess Girard	
2012	Reflexions	Martin Thibaudeau	
2012	Wintergreen (Paparmane)	Joëlle Desjardins Paquette	
2013	A Grand Canal	Johnny Ma	
2013	The Chaperone 3D	Fraser Munden, Neil Rathbone	
2013	The End of Pinky	Claire Blanchet	
2013	An Extraordinary Person (Quelqu'un d'extraordinaire)	Monia Chokri	
2013	In Guns We Trust	Nicolas Lévesque	
2013	Noah	Walter Woodman, Patrick Cederberg	
2013	Paradise Falls	Fantavious Fritz	
2013	Subconscious Password	Chris Landreth	
2013	Time Flies (Nous avions)	Stéphane Moukarzel	
2013	Yellowhead	Kevan Funk	
2014	Bison	Kevan Funk	
2014	The Cut (La Coupe)	Geneviève Dulude-De Celles	
2014	Cutaway	Kazik Radwanski	
2014	Day 40	Sol Friedman	
2014	Kajutaijuq: The Spirit That Comes	Scott Brachmayer	
2014	Mynarski Death Plummet	Matthew Rankin	
2014	Rebel (Bihttoš)	Elle-Máijá Tailfeathers	
2014	Sleeping Giant	Andrew Cividino	
2014	Still	Slater Jewell-Kemker	
2014	The Weatherman and the Shadowboxer	Randall Okita	
2015	Bacon and God's Wrath	Sol Friedman	
2015	Balmoral Hotel	Wayne Wapeemukwa	
2015	Bring Me the Head of Tim Horton	Guy Maddin, Evan Johnson, Galen Johnson	
2015	Interview with a Free Man (Entrevue avec un homme libre)	Nicolas Lévesque	
2015	The Little Deputy	Trevor Anderson	
2015	My Enemy, My Brother	Ann Shin	
2015	Never Steady, Never Still	Kathleen Hepburn	
2015	Nina	Halima Elkhatabi	
2015	O Negative	Steven McCarthy	
2015	Overpass (Viaduc)	Patrice Laliberté	
2016	Blind Vaysha	Theodore Ushev	
2016	Emma	Martin Edralin	
2016	Fish	Heather Young	
2016	Fluffy	Lee Filipovski	
2016	Frame 394	Rich Williamson	
2016	A Funeral for Lightning	Emily Kai Bock	
2016	Her Friend Adam	Ben Petrie	
2016	Mariner	Thyrone Tommy	
2016	Mutants	Alexandre Dostie	
2016	Snip	Terril Calder	
2017	The Argument (with annotations)	Daniel Cockburn	
2017	The Botanist	Maude Plante-Husaruk, Maxime Lacoste-Lebuis	
2017	The Crying Conch	Vincent Toi	
2017	The Drop In	Naledi Jackson	
2017	Flood	Amanda Strong	
2017	Milk	Heather Young	
2017	Pre-Drink	Marc-Antoine Lemire	
2017	Rupture	Yassmina Karajah	
2017	The Tesla World Light	Matthew Rankin	
2017	Threads	Torill Kove	
2018	Accidence	Guy Maddin, Evan Johnson, Galen Johnson	
2018	Altiplano	Malena Szlam	
2018	Biidaaban (The Dawn Comes)	Amanda Strong	
2018	Brotherhood (Ikhwène)	Meryam Joobeur	
2018	Fauve	Jérémy Comte	
2018	Little Waves (Les petites vagues)	Ariane Louis-Seize	
2018	My Dead Dad's Porno Tapes	Charlie Tyrell	
2018	Paseo	Matthew Hannam	
2018	The Subject (Le sujet)	Patrick Bouchard	
2018	Veslemøy's Song	Sofia Bohdanowicz	
2019	Acadiana	Guillaume Fournier, Samuel Matteau, Yannick Nolin	
2019	Cityscape	Michael Snow	
2019	Delphine	Chloé Robichaud	
2019	Docking	Trevor Anderson	
2019	I Am in the World as Free and Slender as a Deer on a Plain	Sofia Banzhaf	
2019	Jarvik	Émilie Mannering	
2019	No Crying at the Dinner Table	Carol Nguyen	
2019	The Physics of Sorrow	Theodore Ushev	
2019	Please Speak Continuously and Describe Your Experiences as They Come to You	Brandon Cronenberg	
2019	Throat Singing in Kangirsuk (Katatjatuuk Kangirsumi)	Eva Kaukai, Manon Chamberland	

=== 2020s ===
Year	Film	Director	Ref
2020	Aniksha	Vincent Toi	
2020	The Archivists	Igor Drljaca	
2020	Benjamin, Benny, Ben	Paul Shkordoff	
2020	Black Bodies	Kelly Fyffe-Marshall	
2020	êmîcêtôcêt: Many Bloodlines	Theola Ross	
2020	Foam (Écume)	Omar Elhamy	
2020	How to Be At Home	Andrea Dorfman	
2020	Scars	Alex Anna	
2020	Sing Me a Lullaby	Tiffany Hsiung	
2020	Stump the Guesser	Guy Maddin, Evan Johnson, Galen Johnson	
2021	Ain't No Time for Women (Y'a pas d'heure pour les femmes)	Sarra El Abed	
2021	Angakusajaujuq: The Shaman's Apprentice	Zacharias Kunuk	
2021	Boobs (Lolos)	Marie Valade	
2021	Defund	Khadijah Roberts-Abdullah, Araya Mengesha	
2021	Fanmi	Sandrine Brodeur-Desrosiers, Carmine Pierre-Dufour	
2021	Honour to Senator Murray Sinclair	Alanis Obomsawin	
2021	Like the Ones I Used to Know (Les grandes claques)	Annie St-Pierre	
2021	Meneath: The Hidden Island of Ethics	Terril Calder	
2021	The Syed Family Xmas Eve Game Night	Fawzia Mirza	
2021	Together	Albert Shin	
2022	Belle River	Guillaume Fournier, Samuel Matteau, Yannick Nolin	
2022	Bill Reid Remembers	Alanis Obomsawin	
2022	The Flying Sailor	Wendy Tilby, Amanda Forbis	
2022	Lay Me by the Shore	David Findlay	
2022	Municipal Relaxation Module	Matthew Rankin	
2022	Nanitic	Carol Nguyen	
2022	No Ghost in the Morgue	Marilyn Cooke	
2022	Same Old	Lloyd Lee Choi	
2022	Simo	Aziz Zoromba	
2022	Violet Gave Willingly	Claire Sanford	
2023	Gaby's Hills (Gaby les collines)	Zoé Pelchat	
2023	I Used to Live There	Ryan McKenna	
2023	Katshinau (Les Mains sales)	Julien G. Marcotte, Jani Bellefleur-Kaltush	
2023	Lake Baikal (Baigal Nuur)	Alisi Telengut	
2023	Madeleine	Raquel Sancinetti	
2023	Making Babies (Faire un enfant)	Eric K. Boulianne	
2023	Motherland	Jasmin Mozaffari	
2023	Mothers and Monsters	Édith Jorisch	
2023	Sawo Matang	Andrea Nirmala Widjajanto	
2023	Thriving: A Dissociated Reverie	Nicole Bazuin	
2024	Are You Scared to Be Yourself Because You Think That You Might Fail?	Bec Pecaut	
2024	EarthWorm	Phillip Barker	
2024	Inkwo for When the Starving Return	Amanda Strong	
2024	Julian and the Wind	Connor Jessup	
2024	Maybe Elephants	Torill Kove	
2024	Mercenaire	Pier-Philippe Chevigny	
2024	On a Sunday at Eleven	Alicia K. Harris	
2024	One Day This Kid	Alexander Farah	
2024	perfectly a strangeness	Alison McAlpine	
2024	Who Loves the Sun	Arshia Shakiba	
2025	Ambush (Kameen)	Yassmina Karajah	
2025	The Girl Who Cried Pearls	Chris Lavis, Maciek Szczerbowski	
2025	Jazz Infernal	Will Niava	
2025	Lloyd Wong, Unfinished	Lesley Loksi Chan	
2025	Klee	Gavin Baird	
2025	La Mayordomía	Martin Edralin	
2025	Pidikwe (Rumble)	Caroline Monnet	
2025	Ramón Who Speaks to Ghosts	Shervin Kermani	
2025	ripe (chín)	Solara Thanh Bình Đặng	
2025	A Soft Touch	Heather Young	

== Charles Officer Award ==
- 2025 - Miryam Charles
- 2026 - Henri Pardo
