= Ambush (2025 film) =

- Directed by: Yassmina Karajah
- Screenplay by: Yassmina Karajah
- Produced by: Raya Aburub; Aseel Abu Ayyash; Joaquin Cardoner; Yousef Abdel Nabi
- Starring: Emad Alkobari; Sereen Khass
- Cinematography: Farhad Ghaderi
- Edited by: Abdallah Sada
- Production company: Imaginarium Films
- Release date: September 6, 2025 (TIFF)
- Running time: 21 minutes
- Countries: Canada; Jordan
- Languages: Arabic; English

Ambush (Kameen) is a Canadian-Jordanian short drama film, directed by Yassmina Karajah and released in 2025. The film tells the initially unrelated, but eventually intersecting, stories of Hasan (Emad Alkobari), a coffee shop clerk in Amman who spends his free time hanging out with friends who don't want to pay the cover charge to get into a new pop-up nightclub, and Jana (Sereen Khass), a woman who has given up drinking but is being pressured by her friends to go to the club.

The film premiered at the 2025 Toronto International Film Festival.

The film was named to the Toronto International Film Festival's annual year-end Canada's Top Ten list for 2025.
