= Mouna Traoré =

Canadian actor and filmmaker (born 1995)

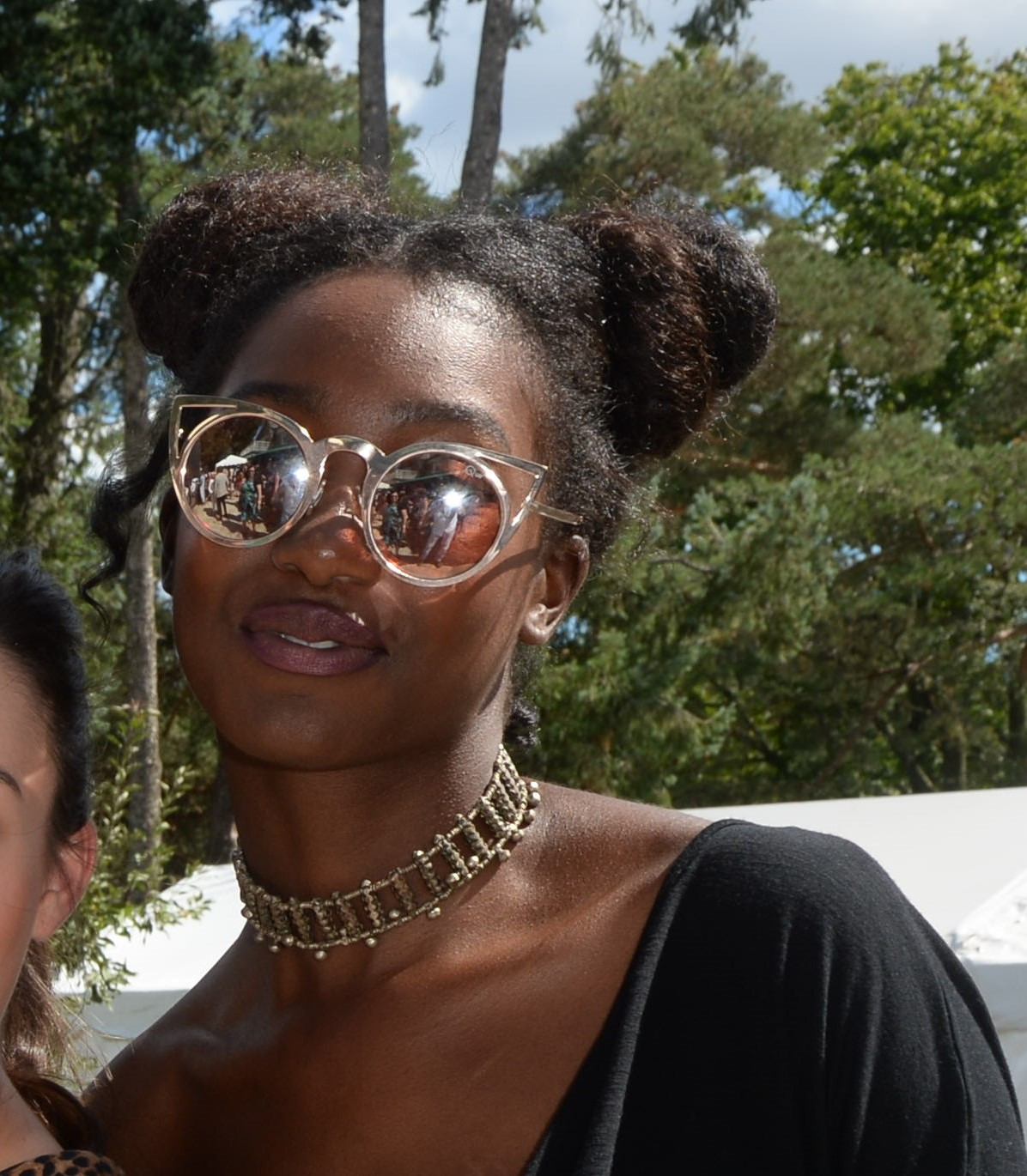
- Traoré in 2016
- Born: May 4, 1995 (age 30); Toronto, Ontario, Canada
- Occupation(s): Actress, filmmaker
- Years active: 2009–present

Mouna Traoré (born May 4, 1995) is a Canadian actress and filmmaker. She is known for her performances in a variety of television series, such as Global TV's Rookie Blue (2012), CBC's Murdoch Mysteries (2015–2018), and Netflix's The Umbrella Academy (2020). Her film work includes the 2017 films The Drop In, which premiered at the Toronto International Film Festival, and Brown Girl Begins, directed by Sharon Lewis.

== Early life ==
Traore was born and raised in Toronto, Canada. Her mother is from Haiti and her father is from Mali.

== Career ==
Traoré began acting at a young age. She attended classes at the Young People's Theatre. She later graduated from the Etobicoke School of the Arts, and completed a Bachelor of Arts and Science at the University of Toronto.

In 2017, Traoré starred in the short film The Drop In, which premiered at the Toronto International Film Festival. She leads the film as Joelle, a hairdresser at a Black Canadian hair salon who faces an unexpected challenge when Grace (Oluniké Adeliyi), a woman she knew in her prior life, drops in ostensibly for a haircut, but in fact with ulterior motives involving Joelle's immigration status. The film was named to TIFF's annual year-end Canada's Top Ten list for short films in December 2017. Also that year, she starred in the Afro-futurist feature film Brown Girl Begins, opposite Emmanuel Kabongo. The film was released theatrically in 2018 and screened at several film festivals.

Traoré has featured in more than a dozen television series, beginning with a recurring role in the Teletoon children's comedy series, Majority Rules!. Her notable television roles include Crystal Markes on Global TV's Rookie Blue(2012), and Rebecca James on CBC's long-running detective series Murdoch Mysteries (2015–2018). She auditioned several times for a part on Murdoch Mysteries, before finally landing a recurring role on the series.

In 2020, she starred in the Netflix series Self Made as Esther, and The Umbrella Academy as Jill.

=== Other work ===
Traoré is the co-founder of a production company, The Mini Films, through which she has written and produced two short films. Her 2015 short film, Adorn, won the award for Best Narrative Short at the Montreal International Black Film Festival.

== Filmography ==
=== Film ===
Year	Film	Role	Notes
2013	Carrie	Erika	
2013	Home Away	Sabrina	Short film
2014	All of Me	Melis	Short film
2015	Muna	Muna	Short film
2016	The Choir	Mouna	Short film
2016	Manhattan Undying	Heather	
2017	The Drop In	Joelle	Short film TIFF
2017	Brown Girl Begins	Ti-Jeanne	

=== Television ===
Year	TV Show	Role	Notes
2009	Majority Rules!	Serena Balfour	9 episodes
2009	'Da Kink in My Hair	Essence	Episode: "Forced Ripe Mango"
2010	Cra$h & Burn	Ruby	2 episodes
2011	Being Erica	Model	Episode: "Purim"
2011	Connor Undercover	Donna	Episode: "Deadly Lipgloss"
2012	Rookie Blue	Crystal Markes	5 episodes
2014	Beauty and the Beast	Hannah	Episode: "Ever After"
2015–2018	Murdoch Mysteries	Rebecca James	28 episodes
2015	Hemlock Grove	Ali	4 episodes
2015	The Book of Negroes	Rosetta	TV mini-series
2016	Shadowhunters: The Mortal Instruments	Midori	2 Episodes
2017	Suits	Jasmine	Episode: "Donna"
2017	Ransom	Kim Newham	Episode: "Grand Slam"
2018	Condor	Iris Loramer	5 episodes
2018	In Contempt	Vanessa Hastings	Main role
2019	American Gods	Ruby Goodchild	2 episodes
2020	Self Made	Esther	3 episodes
2020	The Umbrella Academy	Jill	4 episodes
2022	Big Blue (TV series)	Lea Lionfish and Seahorse Queen	2 episodes
2022	The Porter		

=== Production ===
Year	Film	Position	Notes
2014	All of Me	Producer, writer	Short film
2015	Adorn	Producer, director, writer	Short film

== Accolades ==
Year	Award	Category	Work	Result
2016	Montreal International Black Film Festival	Best Narrative Short	Adorn	Won
