= Angie Chen (director) =

Chinese director based in Hong Kong

- Born: November 5, 1949; Shanghai, China
- Education: University of California Los Angeles
- Occupation: Director

Chinese name
Transcriptions
Standard Mandarin
- Hanyu Pinyin: chén ān qí
Yue: Cantonese
- Jyutping: can4 ngon1 kei4

Angie Chen (Chinese: 陳安琪; pinyin: chén ān qí; Jyutping: can4 ngon1 kei4) is a Chinese director based in Hong Kong who has directed such films as My Name Ain’t Suzie (1985) and This Darling Life (2008), the former earning actress Dennie Yip a Hong Kong Film Award for Best Supporting Actress. Her latest work One Tree Three Lives (2012) which is a documentary about the life of Hualing Nieh Engle, was named as a recommended film by the Hong Kong Film Critics Society Award.

== Biography ==
Chen was born in Shanghai in 1949 and emigrated with her family to Taiwan shortly afterwards. She later moved to America to study communication at the University of Iowa where she earned a bachelor's and a master's degree. While in America she worked part time in film and television production before deciding to study for a second master's in film at UCLA. Afterwards, Chen worked alongside Liu Chia chang on his film The Flag (1981) and then with Jackie Chan in Dragon Lord marking her entry into Hong Kong cinema. Moving to Hong Kong, Chen met with Shaw Brothers executive Mona Fong and was given the opportunity to direct her first film Maybe It’s Love which went on to gross over HK$5 million at the box office. A year later Chen directed Hong Kong drama My Name Ain’t Suzie which although less financially successful earned starring actress Dennie Yip a Hong Kong Film Award for Best Supporting Actress. In 1988 after Chen directed the poorly received romance film Chaos by Design she decided to take a hiatus from directing films to focus on her more successful career making commercials.

Exactly two decades later Chen returned to the film industry with her 2008 documentary This Daring Life which later won Best Documentary at the Golden Horse Awards. Her latest work One Tree Three Lives, a film about the life of Hualing Nieh Engle was released in 2012 to critical approval which earned her nominations from the Hong Kong Film Critics Society.
