= Bacon and God's Wrath =

- Directed by: Sol Friedman
- Produced by: Sarah Clifford-Rashotte; Sol Friedman
- Starring: Razie Brownstone
- Edited by: Sol Friedman
- Music by: Joseph Murray; Lodewijk Vos
- Distributed by: The New Yorker
- Release date: September 13, 2015 (TIFF)
- Running time: 8 minutes
- Country: Canada
- Language: English

Bacon and God's Wrath is a Canadian short documentary film, which premiered at the 2015 Toronto International Film Festival. Directed by Sol Friedman and mixing animation with live action interview footage, the film centres on Razie Brownstone, a 90-year-old Jewish woman who, after undergoing a crisis of faith which has led her to reject many of the tenets of her religion, is preparing to cook and eat bacon for the first time in her life.

At TIFF, the film received an Honourable Mention from the jury for the Best Canadian Short Film award. The film was later named to TIFF's year-end Canada's Top Ten list of the best Canadian short films of the year.

In 2016 the film won the Short Film Jury Award for Non-fiction at the 2016 Sundance Film Festival, and the Canadian Screen Award for Best Short Documentary at the 4th Canadian Screen Awards.
