= Biidaaban (The Dawn Comes) =

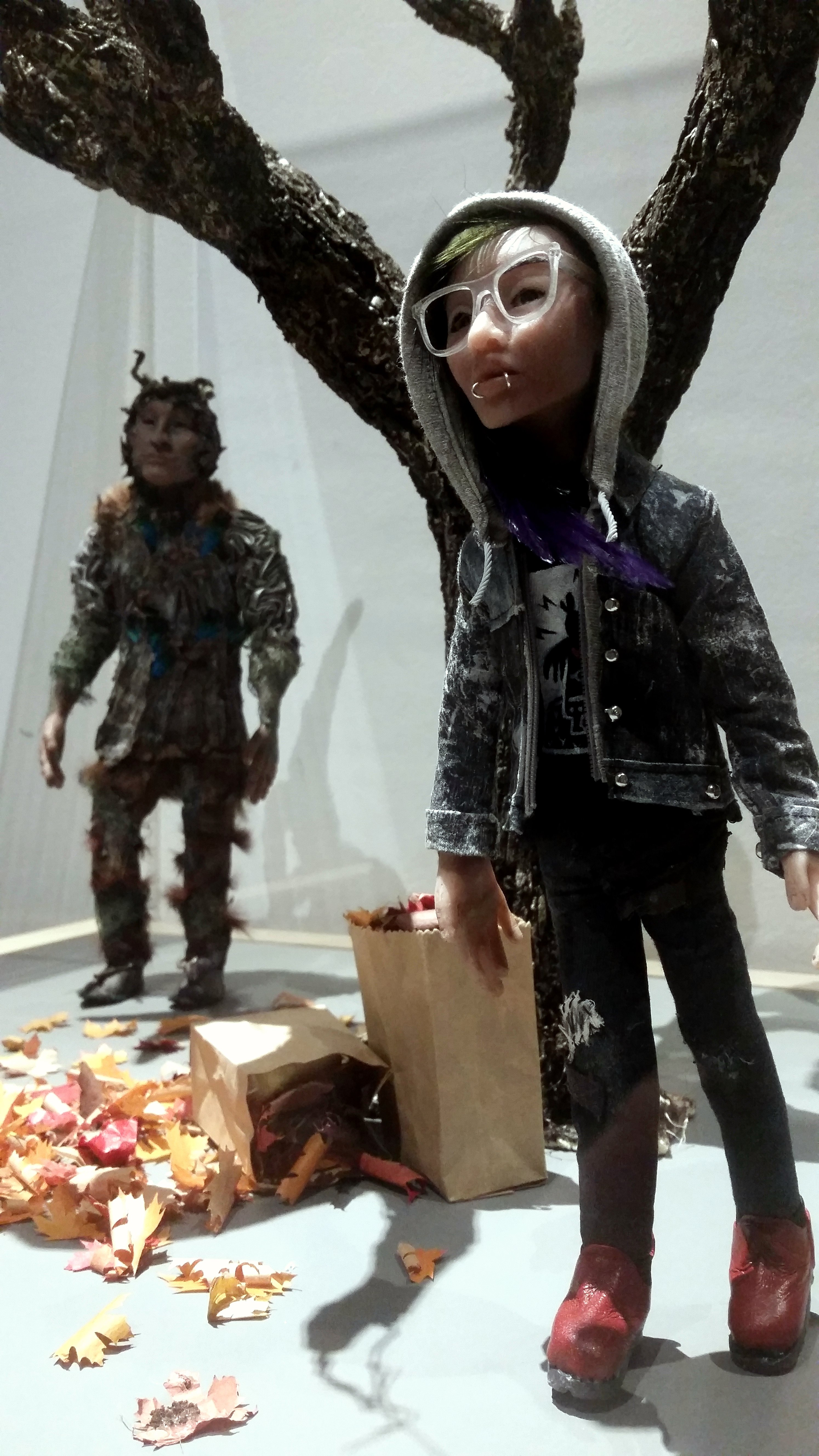
- Stop Motion Puppets used in Biidaaban
- Directed by: Amanda Strong
- Written by: Amanda Strong; Leanne Betasamosake Simpson
- Produced by: Amanda Strong
- Cinematography: Terrance Azzuolo
- Edited by: Marcus Kliewer; Amanda Strong
- Music by: Joseph Murray; Lodewijk Vos
- Production company: Spotted Fawn Productions
- Release date: September 6, 2018 (TIFF)
- Running time: 19 minutes
- Country: Canada
- Language: English

Biidaaban (The Dawn Comes) is a Canadian animated short film, directed by Amanda Strong and released in 2018. Based on the writings of Leanne Betasamosake Simpson, the film centres on Biidaaban, a young shapeshifter on a secret mission to revive the traditional First Nations ritual of harvesting sap from maple trees to make maple sugar, despite living in a contemporary urban area.

The film premiered at the 2018 Toronto International Film Festival. It was subsequently screened at the Ottawa International Animation Festival, where it won the award for Best Script and received an honourable mention from the Best Canadian Animation jury, and at the 2018 Vancouver International Film Festival, where it won the award for Best British Columbia Short Film.

The film was named to TIFF's annual year-end Canada's Top Ten list for 2018. It received a Canadian Screen Award nomination for Best Animated Short Film at the 7th Canadian Screen Awards in 2019.
