= 2017 in Canadian television =

The following is a list of events affecting Canadian television in 2017. Events listed include television show debuts, finales, cancellations, and channel launches, closures and rebrandings.

== Events ==
=== Notable events ===
==== February ====
Date	Event
5	The CRTC rejects simultaneous substitution over Super Bowl LI, giving Canadian viewers the ability to view American Super Bowl commercials in real time; the CRTC ruled that the commercials had become an integral part of the game broadcast and that the network had been botching its simsubs over other programs by cutting in and out at the wrong times. Bell Media, which owns the rights to the Super Bowl broadcasts in Canada, vehemently fought against the proposed rule change, which caused its viewership to drop 39% compared to Super Bowl 50.

==== March ====
Date	Event
12	The 5th Canadian Screen Awards air on CBC.

==== July ====
Date	Event
1	Peter Mansbridge, the anchor of CBC Television's national newscast The National since 1988, retires following the network's live Canada Day broadcast.

==== August ====
Date	Event
1	CBC Television announces that Adrienne Arsenault, Rosemary Barton, Andrew Chang and Ian Hanomansing will be the new anchors of The National, starting on November 6.
31	The digital specialty channel G4 Canada ends operations after just short of sixteen years of operations, with Rogers Media turning in its license for CRTC revocation. It ends four years after the American G4 went off the air, and several months after its intended replacement in the United States, Esquire Network also expired.

==== September ====
Date	Event
4	Jay Onrait and Dan O'Toole return to TSN's SportsCentre after four years in the United States. The pair previously anchored TSN's flagship show from 2003 to 2013.
4	City stations CKEM Edmonton and CHMI Winnipeg relaunch evening newscasts, under the CityNews brand. The news programs, which air at 6 pm and 11 pm, are the first newscasts on the station since the CTVglobemedia's acquisition of previous owner CHUM Limited.
25	Satirist Rick Mercer, host of the eponymous Rick Mercer Report, announces that the upcoming season of the Report will be his last.

==== October ====
Date	Event
17	Bell announces the purchase of French channels Séries+ and Historia.
20	Following the death of iconic Canadian rock singer Gord Downie on October 17, CTV advances the television premiere of Long Time Running, the documentary film by Jennifer Baichwal and Nicholas de Pencier about the Man Machine Poem Tour of 2016, from its originally planned date of November 19.

==== December ====
Date	Event
26	Irv Weinstein, an American actor-turned-news anchor who was widely viewed in Southern Ontario through border blaster WKBW-TV and influenced a large number of Southern Ontario comics who would go on to become internationally famous (such as Eugene Levy, Jim Carrey and Mike Myers), dies at the age of 87 following a 21-month battle with ALS.

== Television programs ==
=== Programs debuting in 2017 ===
Series currently listed here have been announced by their respective networks as scheduled to premiere in 2017. Note that shows may be delayed or cancelled by the network between now and their scheduled air dates.

Start date	Show	Channel	Source
January 1	Ransom	Global	
January 3	Heavy Rescue: 401	Discovery	
January 9	Lâcher prise	Ici Radio-Canada Télé	
January 9	Pure	CBC Television	
January 10	Workin' Moms	CBC Television	
January 25	Cardinal	CTV	
January 25	Mary Kills People	Global	
February 2	Nirvanna the Band the Show	Viceland	
February 17	True North Calling	CBC Television	
February 20	Bellevue	CBC Television	
March 7	The Real Housewives of Toronto	Slice	
March 24	What Would Sal Do?	CraveTV; Super Channel	
March 26	Canada: The Story of Us	CBC Television	
April 10 (web)	Save Me	CBC Television	
May 6	Chuck's Choice	YTV	
July 17	21 Thunder	CBC Television	
August 5	3 Amigonauts	YTV	
September 4	Worst to First	HGTV	
September 21	Bad Blood	City	
September 25	Alias Grace	CBC Television	
November 1	The Great Canadian Baking Show	CBC Television	
November 5	Fubar Age of Computer	City	
November 7	Political Blind Date	TVOntario	
November 23	The Indian Detective	CTV	
Unknown	Adulthood (L'Âge adulte)	Ici TOU.TV	
Unknown	The Neddeaus of Duqesne Island	CBC Comedy	

=== Television films and specials ===
Start date	Show	Channel	Source
March 2	The Skin We're In	CBC Television	
October 20	Long Time Running	CTV	
October 22	Gord Downie's Secret Path in Concert	CBC Television	

== Television stations ==
=== Stations closures ===
Date	Market	Station	Channel	Affiliation	Source
January 27	Kenora, Ontario	CJBN-TV	13 (analog)	Global	

== See also ==
- 2017 in Canada
- List of Canadian films of 2017
