= Aniksha =

2020 Canadian film

- Directed by: Vincent Toi
- Written by: Vincent Toi; Blandine Emilien
- Produced by: Guillaume Collin; Vincent Toi
- Starring: Neeshi Beeharry; Laurent Lucas
- Cinematography: Antoine Ryan
- Edited by: Daniel Dietzel
- Music by: Tobias Rochman
- Distributed by: La Distributrice des films
- Release date: September 12, 2020 (TIFF)
- Running time: 20 minutes
- Country: Canada
- Language: French

Aniksha is a Canadian short drama film, directed by Vincent Toi and released in 2020. The film stars Neeshi Beeharry as Aniksha, a young woman in Mauritius who is caught between tradition and modernity when she takes a job at a call centre soon after entering into an arranged marriage.

The film premiered at the 2020 Toronto International Film Festival. It was named to TIFF's year-end Canada's Top Ten list for short films in 2020.

The film received a Prix Iris nomination for Best Live Action Short Film at the 23rd Quebec Cinema Awards in 2021.
