= Day 40 =

- Film poster
- Directed by: Sol Friedman
- Written by: Evan Morgan
- Produced by: Sol Friedman
- Edited by: Sol Friedman
- Music by: Joseph Murray; Lodewijk Vos
- Animation by: Sol Friedman
- Release date: 2014
- Running time: 5 minutes
- Country: Canada

Day 40 is a Canadian animated short film, directed by Sol Friedman and released in 2014. The film is a retelling of the story of Noah's Ark, told from the perspective of the animals.

The film was named to the Toronto International Film Festival's year-end Canada's Top Ten list for 2014, and received a Canadian Screen Award nomination for Best Animated Short Film at the 3rd Canadian Screen Awards.
