= Ronnie Rowe (actor) =

Canadian actor

Ronnie Fitzroy Rowe Jr., credited professionally as Ronnie Rowe or Ronnie Rowe Jr., is a Canadian film and television actor. He is most noted for his film role as the title character in the 2017 film Black Cop, for which he won the Vancouver Film Critics Circle award for Best Actor in a Canadian Film at the Vancouver Film Critics Circle Awards 2017, and his recurring role as Lieutenant R. A. Bryce in the television series Star Trek: Discovery.

As of 2021, he was slated to have a major role in the then-forthcoming drama series The Porter. The series focuses on a group of 1920s railway workers who unite to form the world’s first Black union, and depicts the Black community in St. Antoine, Montreal, which was known at the time as the “Harlem of the North.” The characters are from Canada, the Caribbean, and the U.S. and arrived in the community via the Underground Railroad and through the Great Migration.
