= Mass for Shut-Ins =

2017 Canadian film directed by Winston DeGiobbi

- Directed by: Winston DeGiobbi
- Written by: Winston DeGiobbi
- Produced by: Winston DeGiobbi
- Starring: Charles William McKenzie; Joey Lee Maclean; Stephen Melanson
- Cinematography: Winston DeGiobbi
- Edited by: Winston DeGiobbi
- Music by: Tyler DeGiobbi
- Production company: Wellington St. North
- Release date: October 2, 2017 (VIFF)
- Running time: 65 minutes
- Country: Canada
- Language: English

Mass for Shut-Ins is a Canadian drama film, directed by Winston DeGiobbi and released in 2017. The film stars Charles William McKenzie as Kay Jay, an aimless slacker living with his grandfather Loppers (Joey Lee Maclean) in New Waterford, Nova Scotia and navigating his fraught relationship with his delinquent older brother September (Stephen Melanson).

The film premiered at the 2017 Vancouver International Film Festival. It screened alongside There Lived the Colliers, a short film by Nelson MacDonald documenting abandoned housing in Cape Breton Island.

It was shortlisted for the Directors Guild of Canada's DGC Discovery Award, and for the Vancouver Film Critics Circle's One to Watch award at the Vancouver Film Critics Circle Awards 2017.
