= Hualing Nieh Engle =

Chinese writer (1925–2024)

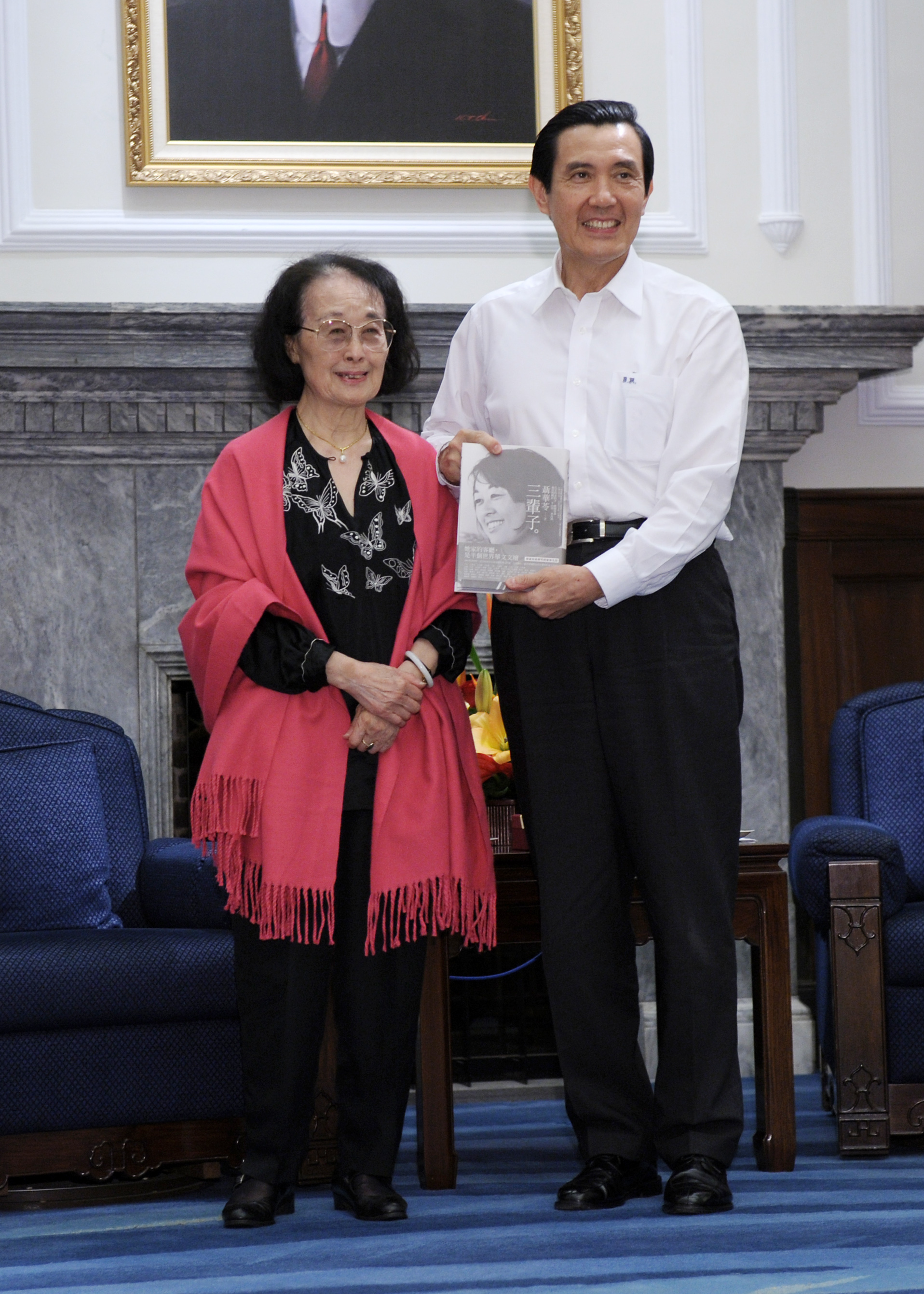
Nieh Engle with Ma Ying-jeou in 2011.

Hualing Nieh Engle (11 January 1925 – 21 October 2024), née Nieh Hua-ling (Chinese: 聶華苓; pinyin: Niè Huálíng; Wade–Giles: Nieh^{4} Hua^{2}-ling^{2}), was a Chinese novelist, fiction writer, and poet. She was a professor emerita at the University of Iowa.

== Early life and education ==
Nieh Hua-ling was born on 11 January 1925, in Wuhan, Hubei, China. In 1936, Nieh's father, an official of the Kuomintang administration, was executed by the Communist Red Army during the Chinese Civil War.

In 1948, she graduated with a degree in English from the Western Languages Department of National Central University. Following the Chinese Communist Revolution, she and her family relocated to Taiwan.

== Career ==
In Taiwan, Nieh became the literary editor and a member of the editorial board of Free China Journal, a liberal intellectual magazine. She served in these positions until 1960, when the magazine was closed down by the Chiang Kai-shek administration.

She also began to teach creative writing courses at National Taiwan University and Tunghai University, becoming the first faculty member to do so in Chinese.

She met Paul Engle, then director of the Iowa Writers' Workshop, while he was visiting Taiwan to research the contemporary literary scene in Asia. He invited her to attend the Writers' Workshop. As the political climate grew worse in Taiwan, she was placed under surveillance and prevented from publishing. She decided to accept Engle's invitation and arrived in Iowa City in 1964 with seven books already published.

In 1966, after receiving her Master of Fine Arts degree in fiction from the Writers' Workshop, she suggested to Engle, then retiring from the Workshop, that they start a writing program solely for international writers. Their joint plan was to invite published writers from all over the world to Iowa City to hone their craft, exchange ideas, and create cross-cultural friendships. With support from the University of Iowa and a private grant, the first group of international writers convened in Iowa City in 1967 as the first participants in the International Writing Program (IWP). They were married in 1971.

With Engle as director and Nieh Engle as assistant director and then associate director, the International Writing Program grew into a recognized residency for literary artists. As an active editor, Nieh Engle sought to introduce little-known Chinese literary trends emerging even in the middle of the Cultural Revolution. She and Engle translated and edited a collection of Mao Zedong's poems. This was followed by a two-volume scholarly collection, Literature of the Hundred Flowers, which she edited and co-translated.

In 1976, to honor their role in promoting exchange among international artists, 300 writers advanced the Engles for the Nobel Peace Prize. The pair was officially nominated by US Ambassador at Large W. Averell Harriman. In 1979 they coordinated a "Chinese Weekend," one of the first encounters between writers from mainland China, Taiwan, Hong Kong, and the diaspora after 1949.

Nieh Engle continued as the director of the International Writing Program (IWP) after Engle's retirement in 1977. She retired in 1988, and subsequently served as a member of the IWP Advisory Board. She was also a member of the panel of judges for the prestigious Asiaweek Short Story Competition.

At the University of Iowa, she was co-director of the Translation Workshop from 1975 to 1988. She received several honorary doctorates as well as an award for Distinguished Service to the Arts from the State of Iowa and the National Association of Governors in 1982. The Chinese magazine Asia Weekly named her novel Sang ch'ing yu t'ao hung (Mulberry and Peach) as one of the top 100 Chinese novels of the 20th century.

Alongside her administrative and editorial work, Nieh Engle maintained an active literary career. She is the author of more than two dozen books, written in Chinese and widely translated, including novels, essay collections, collections of stories, translations, and edited works. These include Mulberry and Peach, which, in its English translation (Mulberry and Peach: Two Women of China), won an American Book Award in 1990; Thirty Years Later (San shih nien hou); Black, the Most Beautiful Color (Hei she, he she, tsui mei li ti yen she); and People in the Twentieth Century (Jen tsai erh shih shih chi). Her most recent novel in Chinese, Far Away, a River (Qian shan wai, shui chang liu), depicts one of the themes that are often reflected in her novels: the search for identity and roots. Her memoir, Images of Three Lives, a picture-essay book, chronicles her experiences in China (including Taiwan) and the United States.

== Death ==
Nieh Engle died on in Iowa City, Iowa, on 21 October 2024, at the age of 99.

== Works ==
=== Books in Chinese ===
- Creeper, novella (1953)
- Jade Cat, short stories (1959)
- The Lost Golden Bell, novel (1960)
- A Small White Flower, short stories (1963)
- The Valley of Dreams, essays (1965)
- Mulberry and Peach, novel (1976)
- Several Blessings of Wang Ta-nien, short stories (1980)
- Stories of Taiwan, selected short stories (1980)
- After Thirty Years, essays (1980)
- Iowa Notes, essays (1983)
- Black, Black, The Most Beautiful Color, essays (1983)
- Lotus (or Far Away, a River), novel (1984)
- A Selection of Taiwan Stories (editor; 1984)
- People in the Twentieth Century, essays (1990)
- Human Scenery and Natural Scenery, selected essays (1986)
- Far Away, A River, novel (1996)
- Tales from the Deer Garden, essays (1996)
- Three Lives, memoir (2004)
- Images of the Three Lives, picture-essay memoir in traditional Chinese character (2007)
- Images of the Three Lives, picture-essay memoir in simplified Chinese character (2008)

=== Books in English (and translations) ===
- The Purse, short stories in English (1959); translated into Portuguese (1967)
- A Critical Biography of Shen Ts'ung-wen, in English (Twanye Publishers, 1972)
- Two Women of China, novel translated into English (1985), Croatian (1986), and Hungarian (1987)
- Mulberry and Peach translated into English (1986), Dutch (1988) and Korean (1990)

=== Books translated into Chinese ===
- Madame de Mauves, Henry James (1959)
- Selected American Stories (includes works by William Faulkner, Stephen Crane, Willa Cather, Sherwood Anderson, Walter Van Tilburg Clark, Stephen Vincent Benét, and F. Scott Fitzgerald, and others) (1960)

=== Books translated into English ===
- Eight Stories by Chinese Women (1963)
- Poems of Mao Tse-tung (with Paul Engle) (1972)
- Literature of the Hundred Flowers (editor, co-translator) (1981) (Vol. 2)

=== Poetry Translation Series (co-edited with Paul Engle and the translator of each language) ===
- Contemporary Korean Poetry (1970)
- Modern Chinese Poetry (1970)
- The Last Romantic: Mihail Eminescu (1972)
- The Poetry of Postwar Japan (1975)
- Writing from the World (1976)
- Modern Bulgarian Poetry (1978)
- Lev Mak, Out of the Night and Other Poems (1978)
- Vasco Popa: Selected Poems (1978)
- Nichita Stanescu, The Still Unborn about the Dead (1978)
- Russian Poetry: The Modern Period (1978)
- Contemporary Yugoslav Poetry (1978)

== Awards ==
- Honorary Degree, Doctor of Humane Letters, University of Colorado (1981)
- Honorary Degree, Doctor of Humane Letters, University of Dubuque (1981)
- Award for Distinguished Service to the Arts, National Association of Governors (1982)
- Honorary Degree, Doctor of Humane Letters, Coe College (1983)
- Award for Fiction, American Book Award (1990), for Mulberry and Peach: Two Women of China
- Medal of Merit for Cultural Service, Ministry of Culture, Poland (1992)
- Honorary Degree, Doctor of Humane Letters, Hong Kong Baptist University (2009)
- Best Chinese Writing in the World, Sin Chew Jit Poh, Malaysia (2009)

== Honors ==
- Member of the International Advisory Board, Translation Center, Columbia University (1984–85)
- Member of the Advisory Board of the Chinese literary magazine Four Seas, China
- Judge, Neustadt International Prize for Literature, USA (1981–82)
- Advisory Professorship, Fudan University, Shanghai, China (1984)
- Honorary Professorship, Beijing Institute of Communications, Beijing, China (1986)
- Advisor, Pegasus International Prize for Fiction, USA (1989–90)
- Inducted into Iowa Women's Hall of Fame (2008)
