= The Crying Conch =

2017 Canadian film

- Film poster
- Directed by: Vincent Toi
- Written by: Vincent Toi
- Produced by: Guillaume Collin; Charles Jonas; Vincent Toi
- Starring: Zidor Montal; Ebby Angel Louis; Lovena Dieudonné
- Cinematography: Marcel Cabrera
- Edited by: Alexander Kasstan; Vincent Toi
- Music by: Andy Dacoulis
- Production companies: Licorne Production; Arpent Films
- Distributed by: La Distributrice de Films
- Release date: February 15, 2017 (Berlin)
- Running time: 20 minutes
- Country: Canada
- Language: Kreyol

The Crying Conch is a Canadian short drama film, directed by Vincent Toi and released in 2017. The film centres on a man who is drawn into a rebellion that parallels the 18th-century story of Haitian revolutionary François Mackandal.

The film premiered at the 2017 Berlin Film Festival, and had its Canadian premiere at the 2017 Toronto International Film Festival. It was subsequently screened at the 2017 Vancouver International Film Festival, where Toi won the award for Most Promising Director of a Canadian Short Film.

The film was named to TIFF's year-end Canada's Top Ten list for short films in 2017.
