= Threads (2017 film) =

2017 film

- Film poster
- Tråder
- Directed by: Torill Kove
- Written by: Torill Kove
- Produced by: Lise Fearnley; Michael Fukushima; Tonje Skar Reiersen
- Edited by: Simen Gengenbach
- Music by: Kevin Dean
- Production companies: National Film Board of Canada; Mikrofilm AS
- Release date: June 16, 2017 (Norwegian Short Film Festival)
- Running time: 8 minutes
- Countries: Canada; Norway

Threads (Norwegian: Tråder) is a Norwegian-Canadian animated short film, directed by Torill Kove and released in 2017. Based on Kove's own experience as an adoptive parent, the film depicts a woman who catches a thread in the sky which carries her to a baby girl. The woman rears and remains connected to the girl through a red thread of love and emotional connection. This lasts until the girl is a young woman old enough to go seek her own thread of connection to a baby of her own.

In advance of the film's release, Kove spoke about her creative process in an interview on the National Film Board of Canada's organizational blog:

...Threads has been an experiment in working simply. I’m drawing on a basic tablet, using Toon Boom Harmony Software — and in the end I’ve opted for one of the basic pre-set brushes. I’ve set myself the challenge of making a five-minute film within a year, and that’s part of the appeal. Keeping it simple makes it easier to try new things with the visual universe that I want to create.

The film premiered at the Norwegian Short Film Festival in June 2017, and had its Canadian premiere at the 2017 Toronto International Film Festival. In December 2017, the film was named to TIFF's annual year-end Canada's Top Ten list for short films.

In 2018, Kove also published the story as a children's book.
