= Allure (2017 film) =

2017 film by Carlos and Jason Sanchez

- Theatrical release poster
- Directed by: Carlos Sanchez; Jason Sanchez
- Written by: Carlos Sanchez; Jason Sanchez
- Produced by: Luc Déry; Kim McCraw
- Starring: Evan Rachel Wood; Julia Sarah Stone; Denis O'Hare
- Cinematography: Sara Mishara
- Edited by: Jesse Riviere; Elisabeth Olga Tremblay
- Music by: Olivier Alary
- Production company: micro_scope
- Distributed by: Les Films Christal
- Release dates: 10 September 2017 (TIFF); 6 April 2018 (Canada)
- Running time: 105 minutes
- Country: Canada
- Language: English

Allure is a 2017 Canadian thriller film written and directed by Carlos and Jason Sanchez in their feature film debut. It stars Evan Rachel Wood, Julia Sarah Stone, and Denis O'Hare.

It originally premiered under the title A Worthy Companion at the 2017 Toronto International Film Festival. In December, TIFF included the film on its annual Canada's Top Ten list of the ten best Canadian films.

== Plot ==
Laura Drake (Evan Rachel Wood) is an emotionally disturbed young woman who works as a house-cleaner for her father's company in an urban environment. One day, Laura meets an unhappy teenager named Eva (Julia Sarah Stone) while on the job. The pair form an unexpected connection, and Laura eventually convinces Eva to leave her oppressive mother and move in with her. Though the relationship initially works, Laura's anxiety soon makes her abusive and controlling, creating an unstable bond between the two women.

== Cast ==
- Evan Rachel Wood as Laura Drake
- Julia Sarah Stone as Eva
- Denis O'Hare as William
- Maxim Roy as Nancy
- Joe Cobden as Benjamin

== Reception ==
In November 2016, The Hollywood Reporter announced that Carlos and Jason Sanchez had cast Julia Sarah Stone in the film, opposite Evan Rachel Wood. The film would follow an emotionally troubled 30-year-old woman named Laura who falls in love with Stone's teenage character Eva, convincing Eva to live with her. The narrative would explore mental trauma, manipulation of a minor, and explicit sexual themes. An early review from the Toronto International Film Festival called the tale "a psychological thriller that focuses on a disturbing and obsessive relationship."

Stone labeled it a dark but necessary story, and revealed that she'd enjoyed working with Wood. "This is an incredible, intense, important story and I'm lucky to have been part of telling it," she said. Allure marked the third in a series of Stone's films (following Wet Bum and Weirdos) to premiere at a Toronto International Film Festival.

On review aggregator website Rotten Tomatoes, the film holds an approval rating of 46% based on 28 reviews, and an average rating of 5.88/10. The website's critical consensus reads, "Allure has visual style and an intriguing Evan Rachel Wood on its side, but a clumsily told story leaves this sexually charged thriller less than the sum of its parts." On Metacritic, the film has a weighted average score of 54 out of 100, based on 11 critics, indicating "mixed or average reviews".

The Sanchez brothers received a nomination for the Directors Guild of Canada's DGC Discovery Award.
