= Rupture (2017 film) =

2017 Canadian film

- Film poster
- Directed by: Yassmina Karajah
- Written by: Yassmina Karajah
- Produced by: David Findlay
- Starring: Assad al Arid; Salam al Marzouqi; Hussein al Ahmad
- Cinematography: Blake Davey
- Edited by: Blake Davey; Yassmina Karajah
- Distributed by: La Distributrice de Films
- Release date: September 2017 (TIFF)
- Running time: 18 minutes
- Country: Canada
- Languages: Arabic; English

Rupture is a Canadian short drama film, directed by Yassmina Karajah and released in 2017. Acted by a cast of predominantly amateur young actors, the film centres on three teenagers, all of whom are recent refugees from Syria, who are living in Vancouver and walking around town looking for a public swimming pool on a hot summer day.

The film stars Assad al Arid as Salim, Salam al Marzouqi as Leila, and Hussein al Ahmad as Yousef. Its cast includes Wazeera al Ahmad, Rania Issa, Mohammad Kallas, Carmen Casanova, Paul Snider, and Tony Giroux.

The film premiered at the 2017 Toronto International Film Festival. It was subsequently screened at the 2017 Vancouver International Film Festival, where it won the award for Best British Columbia Short Film.

The film was named to TIFF's year-end Canada's Top Ten list for short films in 2017.
