= Flood (2017 film) =

2017 Canadian film

- Directed by: Amanda Strong
- Written by: Amanda Strong; Bracken Hanuse Corlett
- Produced by: Dusty Hagerud; Carolynne Hew; Amanda Strong
- Starring: Craig Frank Edes
- Cinematography: Terrance Azzuolo
- Edited by: Dora Cepic
- Music by: Ziibiwan
- Production company: Spotted Fawn Productions
- Distributed by: Canadian Broadcasting Corporation
- Release date: October 1, 2017 (VIFF)
- Running time: 5 minutes
- Country: Canada
- Language: English

Flood is a Canadian animated short film, directed by Amanda Strong and released in 2017. The film tells the story of Thunder, an indigenous youth created by the Spider Woman to combat the flood of lies and threats to indigenous peoples spawned by European colonization of North America.

The film premiered on October 1, 2017 at the 2017 Vancouver International Film Festival.

It was subsequently named to TIFF's year-end Canada's Top Ten list for short films in 2017, and was selected by journalist Jesse Wente for a CBC program of five short films on the theme of "Keep Calm and Decolonize".
