= The Drop In =

- Film poster
- Directed by: Naledi Jackson
- Written by: Naledi Jackson
- Produced by: Priscilla Galvez
- Starring: Mouna Traoré; Oluniké Adeliyi
- Cinematography: Jackson Parrell
- Edited by: Christine Armstrong
- Production company: Foundry Films
- Release date: September 11, 2017 (TIFF)
- Running time: 13 minutes
- Country: Canada
- Language: English

The Drop In is a Canadian short drama film, directed by Naledi Jackson and released in 2017. The film stars Mouna Traoré as Joelle, a hairdresser at a Black Canadian hair salon who faces an unexpected challenge when Grace (Oluniké Adeliyi), a woman she knew in her prior life, drops in ostensibly for a haircut, but in fact with ulterior motives involving Joelle's immigration status.

The film received production funding from the Harold Greenberg Fund in 2016, and premiered at the 2017 Toronto International Film Festival.

The film was named to TIFF's annual year-end Canada's Top Ten list for short films in December 2017.
