= Voices of Kidnapping =

- Spanish: Voces Del Secuestro
- Directed by: Ryan McKenna
- Produced by: Ryan McKenna; Becca Blackwood
- Cinematography: Ryan McKenna
- Edited by: Ryan McKenna
- Distributed by: La Distributrice de Films
- Release date: 2017
- Running time: 14 minutes
- Country: Canada
- Language: Spanish

Voices of Kidnapping (Spanish: Voces Del Secuestro) is a Canadian short documentary film, directed by Ryan McKenna and released in 2017. The film profiles Voces Del Secuestro, a long-running radio show in Colombia which allows people to send messages to family members who have been kidnapped by the Revolutionary Armed Forces of Colombia.

In 2019, the film received a Canadian Screen Award nomination for Best Short Documentary at the 7th Canadian Screen Awards.
