= Maison du Bonheur =

- Film poster
- Directed by: Sofia Bohdanowicz
- Produced by: Sofia Bohdanowicz; Calvin Thomas
- Starring: Juliane Sellam
- Cinematography: Sofia Bohdanowicz
- Edited by: Sofia Bohdanowicz
- Release date: April 23, 2017 (BAFICI)
- Running time: 62 minutes
- Country: Canada
- Language: French

Maison du Bonheur is a 2017 Canadian documentary film directed by Sofia Bohdanowicz. It profiles Juliane Sellam, a 77-year-old French astrologer living in Montmartre.

The film premiered at the Buenos Aires International Festival of Independent Cinema on April 23, 2017, and had a limited theatrical release in the U.S. and Canada in 2018.

== Synopsis ==
Filmed in the Montmartre quarter of Paris, Maison du Bonheur is a portrait of 77-year-old Juliane Sellam, who is as full of life and vibrancy as the iconic neighbourhood she calls home. The film focuses on the daily life of Sellam in the pre-war apartment that the French astrologer has lived in for half a century. In this intimate and eclectic space, Sellam’s world proves to be as expansive as the universe that lies at her doorstep.

Told in 30 episodic segments narrated by Sellam and Bohdanowicz, the matriarch’s life and rich inner world crystallizes though her daily rituals of making coffee, applying makeup, and caring for her geraniums.

== Production ==
In July 2015, Bohdanowicz embarked to Paris to shoot the film at the behest of Sellam's daughter. For production costs, she sought out a $10,000 line of credit to purchase film stock and rented a 16mm Bolex camera. She shot the film over the course of one month and recorded the sound herself. After filming was complete, she applied to grants for post-production funds.

== Release ==
=== Critical reception ===
On review aggregation website Rotten Tomatoes, the film holds an approval rating of 100% based on 7 reviews, and an average rating of 8.2/10. On Metacritic, the film has a weighted average score of 78 out of 100, based on 5 critics, indicating "generally favorable reviews".

The Globe and Mail's Barry Hertz named the film one of his top 10 films of 2018, calling it "a supremely thoughtful and careful study of one elderly Parisian woman" and "as revealing as it is honest and sincere," adding that, "this is a film to seek out and cherish.” Glenn Kenny of The New York Times selected the film as a Critics' Pick and called it "a profound delight." Corey Atad for Vice Magazine praised the film as "a work of empathic delight, conveying the feeling of a life lived while providing only a glimpse at it."

== Accolades ==
Award	Date of ceremony	Category	Recipient(s)	Result	Ref(s)
Directors Guild of Canada	2017	DGC Discovery Award	Sofia Bohdanowicz	Nominated	
Vancouver Film Critics Circle	January 8, 2018	Best Canadian Documentary	Sofia Bohdanowicz	Won	
Vancouver Film Critics Circle	January 8, 2018	Best Director of a Canadian Film	Sofia Bohdanowicz	Nominated	
Toronto Film Critics Association	December 9, 2018	Best Canadian Film	Sofia Bohdanowicz	Nominated	
Toronto Film Critics Association	December 9, 2018	Jay Scott Prize	Sofia Bohdanowicz	Won	
