= Carlos and Jason Sanchez =

Canadian photographers

Carlos and Jason Sanchez (Carlos born 1976 and Jason born 1981 in Montreal, Quebec) are Canadian fine art photographers known for their large-scale dramatic images. Thematically, their work centers on the psychological reflections of their subjects, and encourages the viewer to interact with the work by filling in the details in the open-ended scenes depicted. In their earlier work the Sanchez brothers depended on their pictures appearing to be part of a larger narrative, like a film still, to create narrative tension. Their later work still incorporates narrative threads, but has developed into more of a story within a scene format.

== Biography ==
Carlos and Jason Sanchez were born and raised in the suburbs of Montreal, Quebec, Canada. They attended Concordia University in Montreal, Quebec, Canada. Their studies ended in 2001 and they began collaborating directly after, and had their first solo exhibition in 2002. They have since exhibited internationally with solo exhibitions in the US, Spain, The Netherlands, Belgium, France, and Canada.

Their work is housed in over a dozen museums including Museum of Fine Arts, Houston, the National Gallery of Canada, Musee de la Photographie de Charleroi.

== Work by Carlos and Jason Sanchez ==
The photographs of the Sanchez brothers straddle both the real world and a fictional one. Often familiar places or situations are made to look sinister, and seemingly ordinary situations seem dangerous or uncomfortable. The Sanchez brothers take inspiration from real life events, media sources, or experiences they lived and translate them into a false reality that they create. They also photograph real people 'playing' themselves, such as in the case of their portrait of John Mark Karr, the man who (falsely) confessed to killing JonBenét Ramsey in 1996.

=== Technical information ===
Technically the Sanchez Brothers work both on location and on sets they build and decorate in their studio. Their final prints are often a digital composite of multiple negatives.

Their photographs have been compared to the work of photographers Jeff Wall, Gregory Crewdson, Katy Grannan and Angela Strassheim, as well as film makers Stanley Kubrick, David Lynch, and Paul Thomas Anderson.

=== Installations ===
Their body of work also includes installation work. "Natural Selection" (2005) a large-scale photograph of fighting wolves was exhibited on a 7 x 30-foot lightbox in downtown Montreal, Quebec, Canada. The video-based holographic piece "Between Life and Death" (2006) explores a near-death experience, based on their research of the subject matter. The holographic video takes place inside a real half-crushed city bus. "Buried Alive" (2008) is a glass box of sand and dirt with fragments of a man's body slightly visible in different places, which move to a recorded program.

=== Galleries ===
Carlos and Jason Sanchez are represented by

- TORCH Gallery, Amsterdam, Netherlands
- Christopher Cutts Gallery, Toronto, Ontario

== Film ==
In 2016, they created the vignette Protest for the NFB satirical public service announcement series, Naked Island. In 2017, their feature film debut Allure premiered, originally under the title A Worthy Companion. They received a nomination for the Directors Guild of Canada's DGC Discovery Award in 2017 for the film.

== Publications ==
- Disruptions: Subversion and Provocation in the Art of Carlos and Jason Sanchez. Published by Christopher Cutts Gallery in 2004
- The Moment of Rupture.Co-Published by Christopher Cutts Gallery (Toronto), Torch Gallery (Amsterdam)& Uma, La Maison de l'image et de la Photographie (Montreal), 2007
