= Luk'Luk'I =

- Directed by: Wayne Wapeemukwa
- Written by: Eric Buurman; Angela Dawson; Angel Gates; Ken Harrower; Mark McKay; Wayne Wapeemukwa
- Produced by: Matt Drake; Spencer Hahn
- Starring: Angel Gates; Joe Buffalo; Ken Harrower; Eric Buurman; Angela Dawson
- Cinematography: Jeremy Cox
- Music by: Daniel Ross
- Production companies: Sound & Colour; Thousand Plateaus
- Release date: 10 September 2017 (TIFF)
- Running time: 89 minutes
- Country: Canada
- Language: English

Luk'Luk'I (pronounced "lucklucky") is a Canadian drama film, which premiered at the 2017 Toronto International Film Festival. The feature directorial debut of Wayne Wapeemukwa, the film is an expansion of his earlier short film Luk'Luk'I: Mother, which premiered at the 2014 Toronto International Film Festival.

Set in the Downtown Eastside of Vancouver during the 2010 Winter Olympics, the film centres on five residents of the poverty-stricken neighbourhood. The cast includes Angel Gates, Joe Buffalo, Ken Harrower, Eric Buurman and Angela Dawson. The actors participated directly in writing the screenplay, using their own real-life experiences – including Harrower's experience as a gay man with a disability and Dawson's experience as local underground culture figure "Rollergirl" – to inform and create their characters' storylines.

The film's title refers to the Coast Salish name for the Downtown Eastside.

== Awards and accolades ==
At TIFF, the film won the award for Best Canadian First Feature Film. In December, TIFF named the film to its annual Canada's Top Ten list of the ten best Canadian films.

Wapeemukwa also won the Directors Guild of Canada's DGC Discovery Award.

At the 2017 Vancouver International Film Festival, Luk'Luk'I won the "Best BC Film Award".
