= Milk (2017 film) =

2017 Canadian film

- Directed by: Heather Young
- Written by: Heather Young
- Starring: Babette Hayward
- Cinematography: Daniel Boos
- Edited by: Heather Young
- Release date: September 14, 2017 (TIFF)
- Running time: 15 minutes
- Country: Canada
- Language: English

Milk is a Canadian short drama film, directed by Heather Young and released in 2017. The film stars Babette Hayward as a woman working as a farmhand on a dairy farm, who finds herself facing an unplanned pregnancy of her own.

Young has described the film as inspired by the contrast between the industrialization of the birthing process among farm animals, contrasted against the way pregnancy and motherhood are treated among humans.

The film premiered at the 2017 Toronto International Film Festival. It was subsequently named to TIFF's year-end Canada's Top Ten list for short films in 2017.
