= Vincent Toi =

Mauritian-Canadian film director

Vincent Toi is a Mauritian-Canadian film director. He is most noted for his 2017 short film The Crying Conch, which was named to the Toronto International Film Festival's annual year-end Canada's Top Ten list for 2017; Toi also won the award for Most Promising Director of a Canadian Short Film at the 2017 Vancouver International Film Festival.

== Life and Career ==
Originally from the village of Baie-du-Tombeau in Mauritius, Toi moved to Canada after being accepted into the York University and Sheridan College joint program in design in Toronto, and subsequently studied film at the Mel Hoppenheim School of Cinema at Concordia University in Montreal. He has also directed the short films Frame, Paper Wings (Différence d'altitude) and Our Subject Is Hair, and the documentary film I've Seen the Unicorn.

His newest short film, Aniksha, premiered at the 2020 Toronto International Film Festival, and was again named to the Canada's Top Ten list for 2020.
