= Fail to Appear =

- Directed by: Antoine Bourges
- Written by: Antoine Bourges
- Produced by: Antoine Bourges; Karen Harnisch; Daniel Montgomery
- Starring: Deragh Campbell; Nathan Roder
- Cinematography: Nikolay Michaylov
- Edited by: Antoine Bourges; Ajla Odobasic
- Production company: Film Forge Productions
- Release date: September 29, 2017 (VIFF)
- Running time: 70 minutes
- Country: Canada
- Language: English

Fail to Appear is a 2017 Canadian independent drama film directed by Antoine Bourges in his feature film directorial debut. The film stars Deragh Campbell as Isolde, a social services caseworker trying to assist Eric (Nathan Roder), a man who is about to face a criminal trial on charges of theft.

The film premiered at the 2017 Vancouver International Film Festival.

== Reception ==
Marsha Lederman of The Globe and Mail describe the film as "an utterly watchable piece of experimental Canadian film", and the publication ranked it one of the top 10 best Canadian films of the year. Norman Wilner of Now called it "formally rigorous but surprisingly moving".

The film received three award nominations from the Vancouver Film Critics Circle, for Best Canadian Film, Best Actress in a Canadian Film (Campbell), and Best Supporting Actor in a Canadian Film (Roder).
