= Sol Friedman =

Canadian animator

Sol Friedman is a Canadian animator. He is most noted for his short film Bacon and God's Wrath, which won the Canadian Screen Award for Best Short Documentary at the 4th Canadian Screen Awards.

His other films have included Junko's Shamisen (2010), Beasts in the Real World (2013), Love Songs from an Android (2013), Day 40 (2014) and An Imagined Conversation: Kanye West & Stephen Hawking (2017).
