= Yassmina Karajah =

Jordanian-Canadian filmmaker and screenwriter

Yassmina Karajah is a Jordanian-Canadian filmmaker and screenwriter. She is most noted for her 2017 short film Rupture, which won the award for Best British Columbia Short Film at the 2017 Vancouver International Film Festival, and was named to the Toronto International Film Festival's annual year-end Canada's Top Ten list for 2017.

Born and raised in Amman, she moved to the United Kingdom to study law at the University of Bristol, before moving to Canada in 2012 to study film at the University of British Columbia and the Canadian Film Centre.

Her student film Light won the award for Best Short Film at the 2014 Air Canada enRoute Film Festival. She followed up with the short film Hany in 2016, before releasing Rupture, which premiered at the 2017 Toronto International Film Festival.

She was one of the writers of the 2024 film The Sand Castle, which was directed by Matty Brown.

Her most recent short film, Ambush (Kameen), premiered at the 2025 Toronto International Film Festival.
