= Gregoire (film) =

- Directed by: Cody Bown
- Written by: Cody Bown
- Produced by: Cody Bown; Tito Guillen; Jan Klompje; Aaron Mallin
- Starring: Morgan Taylor Campbell; Jared Abrahamson; Jedidiah Goodacre; Emily Haine; Ben Cotton
- Cinematography: Jan Klompje
- Edited by: Cody Bown; Aaron Mallin
- Music by: Leigh O'Neill
- Production company: Oaks
- Release date: October 2017 (Vancouver)
- Running time: 106 minutes
- Country: Canada
- Language: English

Gregoire is a Canadian drama film, directed by Cody Bown and released in 2017. Shot in Bown's hometown of Fort McMurray, Alberta, the film centres on five directionless young adults struggling to find their place.

The cast includes Morgan Taylor Campbell as Misha, Jared Abrahamson as Felix, Jedidiah Goodacre as Louis, Emily Haine as Alexa, and Ben Cotton as Steve.

The film premiered at the Calgary International Film Festival, where it won the award for Best Canadian Narrative Feature Film, and subsequently screened at the Vancouver International Film Festival.

Bown was nominated for the Directors Guild of Canada's DGC Discovery Award in 2017. The film won two Vancouver Film Critics Circle Awards, for Best Supporting Actor in a Canadian Film (Cotton) and Best Supporting Actress in a Canadian Film (Campbell).
