= Kathleen Hepburn =

Canadian screenwriter and film director

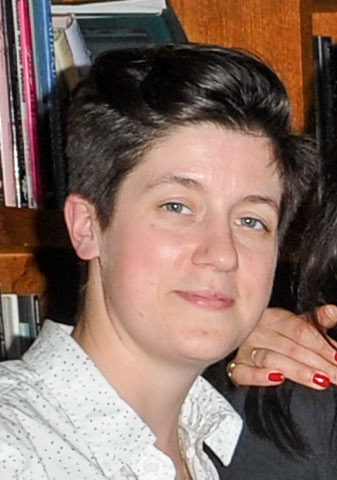
- Occupations: Screenwriter, film director

Kathleen Hepburn is a Canadian screenwriter and film director. She first attracted acclaim for her film Never Steady, Never Still, which premiered as a short film in 2015 before being expanded into her feature film debut in 2017. The film received eight Canadian Screen Award nominations at the 6th Canadian Screen Awards in 2018, including Best Picture and a Best Original Screenplay nomination for Hepburn.

Hepburn garnered further praise for co-directing and co-writing The Body Remembers When the World Broke Open (2019) with Elle-Máijá Tailfeathers. The film premiered at the 69th annual Berlin Film Festival and won three Canadian Screen Awards at the 8th Canadian Screen Awards in 2020, including Best Director and Best Original Screenplay for Hepburn and Tailfeathers. The film also won the Toronto Film Critics Association's $100,000 Rogers Best Canadian Film Award.

She was co-founder with Tyler Hagan of Experimental Forest Films.

== Career ==
Hepburn first attracted acclaim for her film Never Steady, Never Still, which premiered as a short film in 2015 before being expanded into her feature film debut in 2017.

The film received eight Canadian Screen Award nominations at the 6th Canadian Screen Awards in 2018, including Best Picture and a Best Original Screenplay nomination for Hepburn. Hepburn won the Vancouver Film Critics Circle Award for Best Director of a Canadian Film at the Vancouver Film Critics Circle Awards 2017. She was also nominated for the Directors Guild of Canada's DGC Discovery Award.

In 2018, she was one of eight women filmmakers selected for the Academy of Canadian Cinema and Television's Apprenticeship for Women Directors program, alongside Halima Ouardiri, Kirsten Carthew, Alicia K. Harris, Allison White, Asia Youngman, Tiffany Hsiung, and Kristina Wagenbauer.

Her second full-length feature film, The Body Remembers When the World Broke Open, was co-directed with Elle-Máijá Tailfeathers and premiered at the 2019 Berlin Film Festival. The film won the $25,000 Best BC Film Award at the 2019 Vancouver International Film Festival, the Vancouver Film Critics Circle awards for Best Canadian Film and Best Director of a Canadian Film, and the Toronto Film Critics Association's Rogers Best Canadian Film Award. It won three Canadian Screen Awards at the 8th Canadian Screen Awards in 2020, including Best Director and Best Original Screenplay for Hepburn and Tailfeathers, and Best Cinematography for Norm Li. The film also won the Toronto Film Critics Association's $100,000 Rogers Best Canadian Film Award.

In 2020 she released the short documentary film Perfumed Dreaming, a meditation on the cycle of life which contrasts the recent birth of her sister Megan's first child against the recent death of Kathleen and Megan's mother.

== Filmography ==
Year	Title	Director	Writer	Producer	Ref.
2007	Kettle (short)	Yes	Yes	Yes	
2010	It's Not as If We Haven't Been Here for a While... (short)	Yes	Yes	Yes	
2011	A Land That Forgets (short)	Yes	Yes	Yes	
2014	The Housekeeper (short)	No	Yes	No	
2015	Benjamin (short)	No	Yes	No	
2015	Never Steady, Never Still (short)	Yes	Yes	Yes	
2017	Never Steady, Never Still	Yes	Yes	No	
2017	His Name is Willy (short)	No	Yes	No	
2018	Bathroom Rules (short)	No	Yes	No	
2018	Honey Bee	No	Yes	No	
2019	The Body Remembers When the World Broke Open	Yes	Yes	No	
2020	Perfumed Dreaming (documentary short)	Yes	No	No	
2025	The Well	No	Yes	No	

== See also ==
- List of female film and television directors
- List of lesbian filmmakers
- List of LGBT-related films directed by women
