= Unarmed Verses =

- Directed by: Charles Officer
- Written by: Charles Officer
- Produced by: Lea Marin
- Cinematography: Mike McLaughlin
- Edited by: Andres Landau
- Music by: Menalon
- Production company: National Film Board of Canada
- Release date: May 1, 2017 (Hot Docs)
- Running time: 86 minutes
- Country: Canada
- Language: English

Unarmed Verses is a 2017 Canadian documentary film, directed by Charles Officer. The film centres on the predominantly Black Canadian former residents of Villaways, a Toronto Community Housing project which is undergoing demolition and revitalization.

The film premiered at Hot Docs, where it won the award for Best Canadian Feature Documentary.

== Synopsis ==
The documentary follows a year in the life of 12-year-old Francine Valentine and her family during her involvement in a songwriting and recording program run by Art Starts. Valentine struggles with her lack of self-esteem and self-identity. The film is set against the backdrop of community gentrification and apparent lack of concern for her and her neighbourhood.

== Awards ==
In December 2017, the Toronto International Film Festival named the film to its annual Canada's Top Ten list of the ten best Canadian films. It won the People's Choice Award at the Canada's Top Ten minifestival in January 2018.

At the 5th Canadian Screen Awards, Unarmed Verses received two Canadian Screen Award nominations for Best Feature Length Documentary, and for Best Cinematography in a Documentary (Mike McLaughlin).
