= Amanda Strong =

Canadian animator and film director

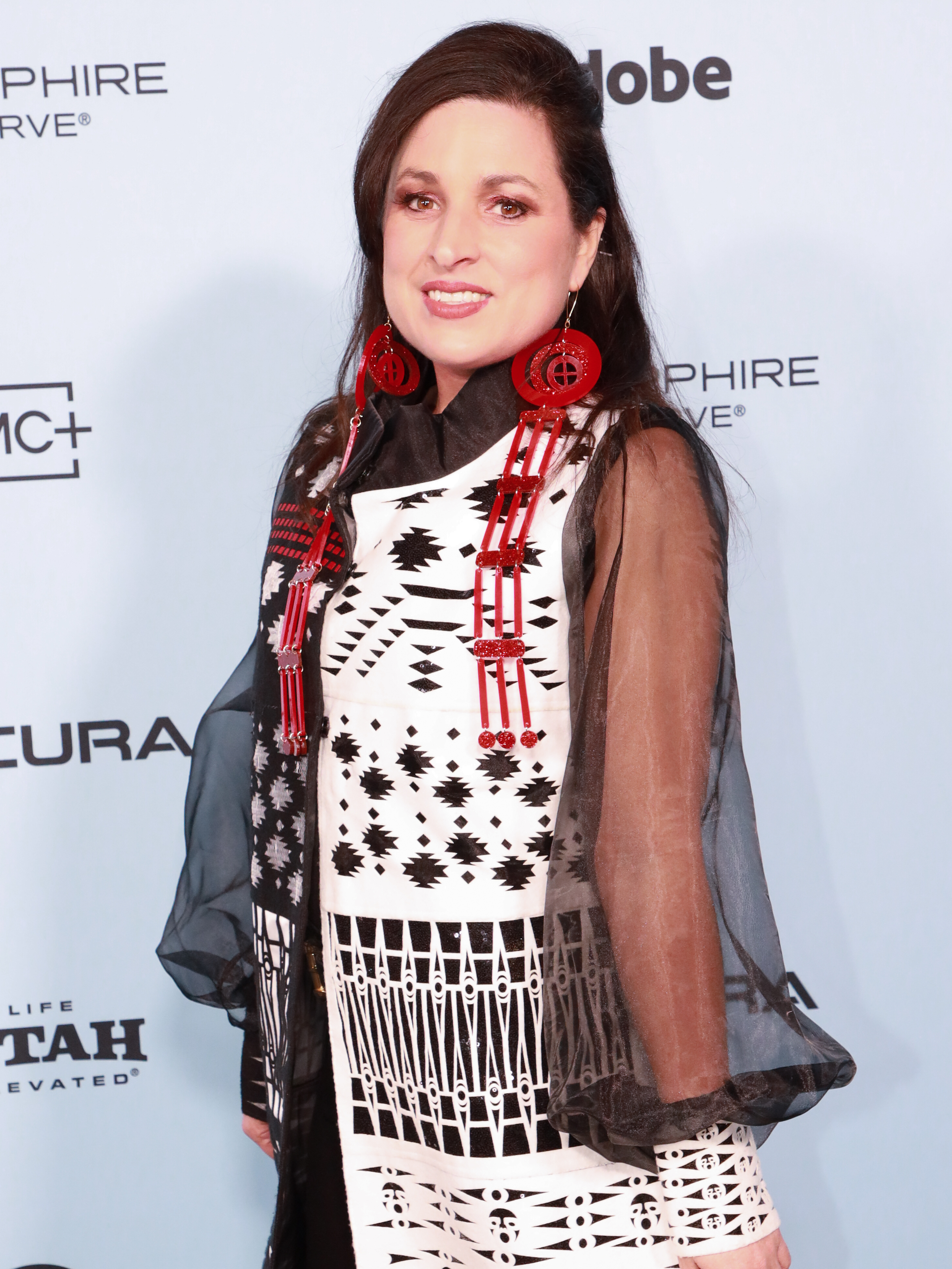
- Strong at the 2025 Sundance Film Festival
- Born: June 25, 1984 (age 41)
- Education: Sheridan College
- Known for: filmmaker, stop-motion animation
- Notable work: Biidaaban (The Dawn Comes) (2018), Indigo (2014), Mia' (Salmon) (2015)
- Website: www.amandastrong.com

Amanda Strong (born 25 June 1984) is a Canadian stop-motion animation filmmaker who resides in Vancouver, Canada. She has exhibited work and her films have been screened at festivals worldwide, including Cannes Film Festival, Toronto International Film Festival, Vancouver International Film Festival, and the Ottawa International Animation Festival. Strong is Red River Métis and a member of the Manitoba Métis Federation.

== Personal life and education ==
Strong currently resides in Vancouver, British Columbia, but grew up in Mississauga, Ontario and has lived in Toronto, Ontario and Montreal, Quebec.

Strong studied illustration, media, and photography at Sheridan College Institute of Technology and Advanced Learning in Oakville, Ontario.

== Film career ==
Strong's films tell Indigenous stories through a style she calls "hybrid documentary" as she combines stop-motion animation with new media technology. Strong's style merges genres such as documentary, animation and more traditional narrative driven storytelling. Her background is in photography, illustration, and media. The themes of reclamation of Indigenous histories, lineages, languages and cultures often appear in her works.

Strong is the founder of Spotted Fawn Productions, a production studio that provides mentorship and training opportunities for emerging and diverse artists.

== Awards and grants ==
Strong has received grants from the Canada Council for the Arts, Ontario Arts Council and the National Film Board of Canada. In 2009, Strong was the recipient of the ImagineNATIVE/LIFT mentorship. In 2013, Strong was awarded the K.M. Hunter Artist Award for Film and Video. In 2015, she was awarded the Vancouver Mayor's Arts Award for Emerging Media Artist. In 2016, she was selected by Alanis Obomsawin to receive $50,000 in services from Technicolor as part of Obomsawin's Clyde Gilmour Technicolor Award at the 2016 Toronto Film Critics Association Awards.

The film Mia that Strong co-directed with Bracken Hanuse Corlett won the Golden Sheaf Award for Best Aboriginal at the 2016 Yorkton Film Festival. In 2018, she was awarded best script as well as Special Mention for her short film Biidaaban at the Ottawa International Animation Festival. Biidaaban is also a nominee for best animated short in the 2019 Canadian Screen Awards

== Filmography ==
| Year | Title | Contribution |
|---|---|---|
| 2008 | Alice Eaton | Director/Writer/Editor |
| 2009 | Honey for Sale | Director/Writer/Editor |
| 2014 | Haida Raid 3: Save Our Waters | Director/Animator/Mentor/Editor |
| 2014 | Indigo | Director/Co-Writer/Illustrator/VFX |
| 2015 | Mia | Director/Animator/Producer/VFX |
| 2015 | How To Steal A Canoe | Director/Producer/Animator |
| 2016 | Breaking Point Episode X Company CBC | Director/Producer/Animator |
| 2016 | Hipster Headdress | Director/Producer/Animator |
| 2016 | Four Faces of the Moon | Director/Writer/Producer/Animator/Illustrator |
| 2017 | Ghost Food | Producer |
| 2017 | Flood | Director/Producer/Animator |
| 2018 | Biidaaban (The Dawn Comes) | Director/Producer/Animator |
| 2024 | Inkwo for When the Starving Return | Director/Producer/Animator |
