= Black Cop =

- Directed by: Cory Bowles
- Written by: Cory Bowles
- Produced by: Aaron Horton
- Starring: Ronnie Rowe; Sophia Walker; Sebastien Labelle
- Cinematography: Jeff Wheaton
- Edited by: Jeremy Harty
- Music by: Dillon Baldassero
- Production company: Black Op Films
- Distributed by: Samuel Goldwyn Films
- Release date: September 11, 2017 (TIFF)
- Running time: 91 minutes
- Country: Canada
- Language: English

Black Cop is a Canadian drama film, which premiered at the 2017 Toronto International Film Festival. The full-length directorial debut of actor Cory Bowles, the film is an expansion of his earlier short film of the same name.

The film stars Ronnie Rowe as a Black Canadian police officer who himself becomes the victim of racial profiling and takes revenge on his community.

In February 2018, the film was picked up by Samuel Goldwyn Films for distribution in the United States.

== Plot ==
Part 1

The film starts off with a monologue of an African Canadian cop (Ronnie Rowe Jr.) recalling his childhood. When he was young, a little boy called him a name relating to a candy bar and he did nothing. After hearing this offensive name multiple times he eventually responded with picking up his textbook and beating him over the head with it. During this part he makes remarks on how his race alienates him because he is a cop: His father (who died before he got his badge) told his son that if you are ever stopped by the police even for the time you should put your hands up and freeze. He ends this part by saying that he never really did listen to his father.

In the present, while Ronnie is out jogging wearing earphones, a white police officer tries to stop him relating to a burglary in the neighborhood. As Ronnie is unable to hear him due to the earphones and doesn't comply, the officer becomes aggressive and ends up detaining Ronnie, letting him go once discovered that he is a police officer. This incident affects him, making him stressed during his job. He starts seeing an imaginary black boy named Kyle who was shot in a police incident recently.

One day Ronnie overhears another cop on the police radio who is about to arrest two black kids on the street without any evidence. So, he turns off his GPS, and arrives on the scene knocking the other cop unconscious and puts him inside a dumpster after stripping his uniform and cuffing him.

Part 2

"Just a friendly game of Baseball"

Ronnie starts abusing his power including harassing and beating white civilians. There are several interview styled monologues from Ronnie in between the scenes where he portrays himself as a victim of racism and refusing to believe he has become a part of the problem. Several reports of the civilian harassment incidents start circulating in the police department. The cops think that someone dressed as a cop is related to the harassment incidents. Ronnie's colleague a female black cop starts suspecting him as she notices changes in his behaviour and sees him leaving an area where the harassment incident occurred.

Part 3

"Zombie no go Stop"

Ronnie's mental condition worsens as he starts talking to an imaginary self in his car. The female black cop catches Ronnie trying to destroy the bodycam of the police officer he knocked out in part one. He defends himself taking the moral high ground, and ends up giving up his badge. He then abandons his police car, leaving his job as a police officer and joins a black rights movement.

== Awards and accolades ==
At the 2017 Vancouver International Film Festival, Black Cop won the award for Best Canadian Film. At the 6th Canadian Screen Awards in 2018, the film won the John Dunning Discovery Award.

Bowles received a nomination for the Directors Guild of Canada's DGC Discovery Award in 2017.
