= List of Canadian films of 2018 =

This is a list of Canadian films released in 2018:

Title	Director	Cast	Genre	Notes	Ref
1991	Ricardo Trogi	Jean-Carl Boucher, Sandrine Bisson, Juliette Gosselin	Comedy-drama	Sequel to Trogi's earlier films 1981 and 1987	
Accidence	Guy Maddin, Evan Johnson, Galen Johnson		Short drama		
The Accountant of Auschwitz	Matthew Shoychet	Thomas Walther, Oskar Gröning	Documentary		
Altiplano	Malena Szlam		Short documentary		
Angelique's Isle	Marie-Hélène Cousineau, Michelle Derosier	Julia Jones, Charlie Carrick, Tantoo Cardinal	Drama		
ante mis ojos	Lina Rodriguez		Short documentary		
Animal Behaviour	Alison Snowden, David Fine		Animated short		
Anote's Ark	Matthieu Rytz	Anote Tong	Documentary		
Anthropocene: The Human Epoch	Jennifer Baichwal, Nicholas de Pencier, Edward Burtynsky		Documentary		
At First Light	Jason Stone	Stefanie Scott, Théodore Pellerin	Drama		
An Audience of Chairs	Deanne Foley	Carolina Bartczak, Peter MacNeill, Gord Rand, Edie Inksetter, Christopher Jacot	Drama		
Biidaaban: First Light	Lisa Jackson		Virtual reality documentary		
Biidaaban (The Dawn Comes)	Amanda Strong		Animated short		
Black Forest (Forêt Noire)	Philippe David Gagné, Jean-Marc E. Roy	Pascale Montpetit, Nadia Essadiqi, Charli Arcouette-Martineau, Jean-Carl Boucher	Short drama		
La Bolduc	François Bouvier	Debbie Lynch-White, Émile Proulx-Cloutier, Mylène Mackay	Drama		
Brotherhood (Ikhwène)	Meryam Joobeur		Short drama		
Carmine Street Guitars	Ron Mann		Documentary		
Catch and Release	Dominique Cardona, Laurie Colbert	Laurence Leboeuf, Aidan Devine, Peter Mooney	Drama	Premiered as Keely and Du before being retitled Catch and Release	
Caterpillarplasty	David Barlow-Krelina		Animated short		
Circle of Steel	Gillian McKercher	Chantelle Han, Duncan Ollerenshaw	Comedy-drama	Circle of Steel is a dark comedy about the safety culture of the oil and gas industry. The film was shot in Alberta, Canada, and was one of six productions to receive a government grant. Circle of Steel premiered at the Calgary International Film Festival in September 2018.	
City Dreamers	Joseph Hillel	Phyllis Lambert, Blanche Lemco van Ginkel, Cornelia Oberlander, Denise Scott Brown	Documentary		
Clara	Akash Sherman		Drama		
A Colony (Une colonie)	Geneviève Dulude-De Celles	Émilie Bierre, Irlande Côté, Jacob Whiteduck-Lavoie, Robin Aubert	Drama	Canadian Screen Award winner for Best Motion Picture	
Crown and Anchor	Andrew Rowe	Michael Rowe, Matt Wells	Drama		
The Dancing Dogs of Dombrova	Zack Bernbaum	Katherine Fogler, Douglas Nyback	Comedy-drama		
Dark Suns (Soleils noirs)	Julien Élie		Documentary		
The Death and Life of John F. Donovan	Xavier Dolan	Kit Harington, Ben Schnetzer, Natalie Portman, Bella Thorne, Susan Sarandon	Drama	Planned for the 2018 Toronto International Film Festival	
Destierros	Hubert Caron-Guay		Documentary		
Earth: Seen from the Heart (La Terre vue du cœur)	Iolande Cadrin-Rossignol	Hubert Reeves	Documentary		
Edge of the Knife	Gwaai Edenshaw and Helen Haig-Brown	Tyler York	Drama		
Etthén Heldeli: Caribou Eaters	Ian Toews		Documentary		
Everything Outside	David Findlay	Ahmed Muslimani, Louise Portal	Drama		
The Fall of Sparta (La chute de Sparte)	Tristan Dubois	Lévi Doré, Johnathan St-Armand, Eric K. Boulianne, William Cantin, Lili-Ann De Francesco	Drama		
The Fall of the American Empire (La chute de l'empire américain)	Denys Arcand	Alexandre Landry, Maxim Roy, Yan England	Crime thriller	Thematically related, but not a literal sequel, to Arcand's 1986 film The Decline of the American Empire	
Falls Around Her	Darlene Naponse	Tantoo Cardinal	Drama		
Family First (Chien de garde)	Sophie Dupuis	Jean-Simon Leduc, Paul Ahmarani	Crime	Nominated for the Prix Iris for Best Film	
The Far Shore (Dérive)	David Uloth	Éléonore Loiselle, Maèva Tremblay, Mélissa Désormeaux-Poulin, Émilie Bierre, Réal Bossé	Drama		
Fausto	Andrea Bussmann		Docufiction		
Fauve	Jérémy Comte		Short drama		
Ferris's Room	Ryan Mains	Sarah Keenlyside	Documentary		
Finding Big Country	Kathleen Jayme	Bryant Reeves	Documentary		
Firecrackers	Jasmin Mozaffari	Michaela Kurimsky, Karena Evans	Drama		
The Fireflies Are Gone (La disparition des lucioles)	Sébastien Pilote	Pierre-Luc Brillant, Marie-France Marcotte, François Papineau, Luc Picard, Karelle Tremblay	Drama		
First Stripes (Premières armes)	Jean-François Caissy		Documentary		
The Fish and the Sea	Phillip Thomas	Maxwell Haynes, Sara Canning, Kurt Max Runte	Short drama		
For Those Who Don't Read Me (À tous ceux qui ne me lisent pas)	Yan Giroux	Martin Dubreuil, Céline Bonnier, Henri Picard	Drama		
Freaks	Zach Lipovsky and Adam Stein		Drama		
The Fruit Machine	Sarah Fodey		Documentary		
Genesis (Genèse)	Philippe Lesage	Théodore Pellerin, Noée Abita, Pier-Luc Funk	Drama		
Giant Little Ones	Keith Behrman	Kyle MacLachlan, Maria Bello, Josh Wiggins	Drama		
The Go-Getters	Jeremy Lalonde	Aaron Abrams, Tommie-Amber Pirie, Kristian Bruun, Ennis Esmer, Scott Thompson	Comedy		
The Great Darkened Days (La grande noirceur)	Maxime Giroux		Drama		
The Grizzlies	Miranda de Pencier	Will Sasso, Ben Schnetzer, Tantoo Cardinal, Eric Schweig, Natar Ungalaaq	Drama		
Happy Face	Alexandre Franchi	Robin L'Houmeau, Debbie Lynch-White, Alison Midstokke	Drama		
Honey Bee	Rama Rau	Julia Sarah Stone, Martha Plimpton, Peter Outerbridge, Sofia Banzhaf	Drama		
The Hummingbird Project	Kim Nguyen	Jesse Eisenberg, Alexander Skarsgård, Salma Hayek	Drama, thriller		
Immaculate Memories: The Uncluttered Worlds of Christopher Pratt	Kenneth J. Harvey		Documentary		
Incredible Violence	G. Patrick Condon	Stephen Oates, M. J. Kehler	Comedy horror		
Into Invisible Light	Shelagh Carter	Jennifer Dale, Peter Keleghan, Kari Matchett, Stuart Hughes, Jaydee-Lynn McDougall, Kristen Harris, Martha Henry	Romantic drama		
Invisible Essence: The Little Prince	Charles Officer		Documentary		
Isla Blanca	Jeanne Leblanc	Charlotte Aubin, Judith Baribeau, Luc Picard, Théodore Pellerin	Drama		
Just a Breath Away (Dans la brume)	Daniel Roby	Romain Duris, Olga Kurylenko, Fantine Harduin, Michel Robin	Drama		
Kingsway	Bruce Sweeney	Gabrielle Rose, Jeff Gladstone, Camille Sullivan, Agam Darshi, Colleen Rennison	Comedy-drama		
Kivitoo: What They Thought of Us	Zacharias Kunuk		Documentary		
Letter from Masanjia	Leon Lee		Documentary		
Level 16	Danishka Esterhazy	Katie Douglas, Sara Canning, Peter Outerbridge	Science fiction		
Little Italy	Donald Petrie	Emma Roberts, Hayden Christensen, Alyssa Milano	Romantic comedy		
Little Waves (Les petites vagues)	Ariane Louis-Seize		Short drama		
Love Jacked	Alfons Adetuyi	Amber Stevens West, Shamier Anderson, Lyriq Bent	Romantic comedy		
Love, Scott	Laura Marie Wayne	Scott Jones	Documentary		
Luba	Caley Wilson	Nicole Maroon, Vladimir Jon Cubrt, Porter Schaefer, Jillian Rees-Brown	Drama		
M/M	Drew Lint	Antoine Lahaie, Nicolas Maxim Endlicher	Drama		
Mad Dog Labine	Jonathan Beaulieu-Cyr, Renaud Lessard	Emmanuel Bilodeau, Charlotte Aubin, Zoé Audet, Pascal Beaulieu	Drama		
Mahalia Melts in the Rain	Émilie Mannering, Carmine Pierre-Dufour	Kaiyonni Banton-Renner, Sagine Sémajuste	Short drama		
Man Running	Gary Burns	Gord Rand, Ivana Shein	Drama		
Mouthpiece	Patricia Rozema		Drama		
The Museum of Forgotten Triumphs	Bojan Bodružić		Documentary		
My Boy (Mon Boy)	Sarah Pellerin	Henri Picard, Marilyn Castonguay, Alexandre Landry	Short drama		
My Dead Dad's Porno Tapes	Charlie Tyrell		Documentary		
The Nest (Le nid)	David Paradis	Pierre-Luc Brillant, Isabelle Blais	Thriller		
The New Romantic	Carly Stone	Jessica Barden, Avan Jogia, Timm Sharp, Hayley Law	Romantic comedy		
Octavio Is Dead!	Sook-Yin Lee	Sarah Gadon, Rosanna Arquette, Raoul Trujillo	Supernatural drama		
One of the Guys (Ti-Gars)	Doris Buttignol	Vincent Lamarre	Documentary		
The Padre	Jonathan Sobol	Tim Roth, Nick Nolte, Luis Guzman	Drama		
Paseo	Matthew Hannam	Sarah Gadon, Peter Mooney	Short drama		
Pauline Julien, Intimate and Political (Pauline Julien: intime et politique)	Pascale Ferland	Pauline Julien, Gérald Godin	Documentary		
A Place to Live (Pour vivre ici)	Bernard Émond	Élise Guilbault, Sophie Desmarais, Danny Gilmore	Drama		
Pogey Beach	Jeremy Larter	Celia Owen, Dennis Trainor, Robbie Carruthers, Ryan Cameron	Comedy		
Prince's Tale	Jamie Miller	Prince Amponsah	Documentary		
Prosecuting Evil: The Extraordinary World of Ben Ferencz	Barry Avrich		Documentary		
Quiet Killing (Ce silence qui tue)	Kim O'Bomsawin	Lorelei Williams, Angel Gates, Tantoo Cardinal	Documentary		
Racetime (La Course des tuques)	Benoît Godbout, Jean-François Pouliot		Animated	Sequel to 2015 film Snowtime!	
Red Rover	Shane Belcourt	Kristian Bruun, Cara Gee	Science fiction/romantic comedy		
Road to the Lemon Grove	Dale Hildebrand	Burt Young, Rossella Brescia, Nick Mancuso, Charly Chiarelli	Comedy-drama		
Roads in February (Les routes en février)	Katherine Jerkovic	Arlen Aguayo-Stewart, Gloria Demassi, Mathias Perdigón	Drama		
Les Salopes, or the Naturally Wanton Pleasure of Skin (Les salopes ou le sucre naturel de la peau)	Renée Beaulieu		Drama		
Slut in a Good Way (Charlotte a du fun)	Sophie Lorain	Marguerite Bouchard, Romane Denis, Rose Adam, Anthony Therrien	Comedy-drama		
Sharkwater Extinction	Rob Stewart		Documentary		
Skies Are Not Just Blue	Lysandre Cosse-Tremblay		Documentary		
Sorry for Your Loss	Collin Friesen	Justin Bartha, Bruce Greenwood, Sandrine Holt, Lolita Davidovitch	Comedy-drama		
Spice It Up	Lev Lewis, Yonah Lewis, Calvin Thomas	Jennifer Hardy CK, Shivali Barot	Comedy-drama		
Splinters	Thom Fitzgerald	Sofia Banzhaf, Shelley Thompson, Callum Dunphy, Mary-Colin Chisholm	Drama		
SuperGrid	Lowell Dean	Leo Fafard, Marshall Williams, Natalie Krill	Science fiction		
The Stone Speakers	Igor Drljaca		Documentary		
The Subject	Patrick Bouchard		Animated short		
Summer of 84	François Simard, Anouk Whissell, Yoann-Karl Whissell	Graham Verchere, Judah Lewis, Caleb Emery	Horror	Canadian-American co-production	
Take Light	Shasha Nakhai		Documentary		
Third Wedding (Troisièmes noces)	David Lambert	Bouli Lanners, Rachel Mwanza, Eric Kabongo	Comedy-drama	Belgian-Canadian-Luxembourgian coproduction	
This Mountain Life	Grant Baldwin		Documentary		
Three Feathers	Carla Ulrich	David Burke, Joel Evans, Dwight Moses, Eileen Beaver, Henry Beaver	Drama	Adaptation of the novel by Richard Van Camp	
Those Who Come, Will Hear (Ceux qui viendront, l'entendront)	Simon Plouffe		Documentary		
Through Black Spruce	Don McKellar	Tanaya Beatty, Tantoo Cardinal, Graham Greene	Drama		
Tia and Piujuq	Lucy Tulugarjuk	Tia Bshara, Nuvvija Tulugarjuk	Children's drama		
A Translator (Un Traductor)	Rodrigo Barriuso, Sebastián Barriuso	Rodrigo Santoro	Drama		
Trouble in the Garden	Roz Owen	Cara Gee, Jon Cor, Fiona Reid, Frank Moore	Drama		
Veslemøy's Song	Sofia Bohdanowicz	Deragh Campbell, Joan Benac	Short drama		
Ville Neuve	Félix Dufour-Laperrière	Robert Lalonde, Johanne-Marie Tremblay, Théodore Pellerin, Gildor Roy, Paul Ahmarani	Animated drama		
What Is Democracy?	Astra Taylor		Documentary		
What Walaa Wants	Christy Garland	Walaa Khaled Fawzy Tanji	Documentary		
When Love Digs a Hole (Quand l'amour se creuse un trou)	Ara Ball	Robert Naylor, France Castel, Julie Le Breton, Patrice Robitaille	Comedy-drama		
When the Storm Fades	Seán Devlin		Comedy-drama, docufiction		
With Love (L'Amour)	Marc Bisaillon	Pierre-Luc Lafontaine, Paul Doucet, Fanny Mallette	Drama		
Xalko	Sami Mermer, Hind Benchekroun		Documentary		
You Are Here	Moze Mossanen		Documentary		
Ziva Postec: The Editor Behind the Film Shoah (Ziva Postec : La monteuse derrière le film Shoah)	Catherine Hébert		Documentary		

== See also ==
- 2018 in Canada
- 2018 in Canadian television
