= 2018 Toronto International Film Festival =

Annual Canadian film festival

- Festival poster
- Opening film: Outlaw King by David Mackenzie
- Closing film: Jeremiah Terminator LeRoy by Justin Kelly
- Location: Toronto, Ontario, Canada
- Founded: 1976
- Awards: Green Book (People's Choice Award)
- Festival date: September 6–16, 2018
- Website: www.tiff.net/tiff/

TIFF chronology
- 2019 2017

The 43rd annual Toronto International Film Festival was held from September 6 to 16, 2018. In June 2018, the TIFF organizers announced a program to ensure that at least 20 percent of all film critics and journalists given press accreditation to the festival were members of underrepresented groups, such as women and people of color. The People's Choice Award was won by Green Book, directed by Peter Farrelly.

== Awards ==
Award	Film	Director
People's Choice Award	Green Book	Peter Farrelly
People's Choice Award, First Runner Up	If Beale Street Could Talk	Barry Jenkins
People's Choice Award, Second Runner Up	Roma	Alfonso Cuarón
People's Choice Award: Documentary	Free Solo	E. Chai Vasarhelyi and Jimmy Chin
People's Choice Award: Documentary, First Runner Up	This Changes Everything	Tom Donahue
People's Choice Award: Documentary, Second Runner Up	The Biggest Little Farm	John Chester
People's Choice Award: Midnight Madness	The Man Who Feels No Pain (Mard Ko Dard Nahi Hota)	Vasan Bala
People's Choice Award: Midnight Madness, First Runner Up	Halloween	David Gordon Green
People's Choice Award: Midnight Madness, Second Runner Up	Assassination Nation	Sam Levinson
Platform Prize	Cities of Last Things	Ho Wi Ding
Platform Prize, Honourable Mention	The River	Emir Baigazin
Best Canadian Feature Film	The Fireflies Are Gone (La disparition des lucioles)	Sébastien Pilote
Best Canadian Short Film	Brotherhood (Ikhwène)	Meryam Joobeur
Best Canadian Short Film, Honourable Mention	Fauve	Jérémy Comte
Best Canadian First Feature Film	Roads in February (Les routes en février)	Katherine Jerkovic
FIPRESCI Discovery Prize	Float Like a Butterfly	Carmel Winters
FIPRESCI Discovery Prize, Honourable Mention	Twin Flower	Laura Luchetti
FIPRESCI Special Presentations	Skin	Guy Nattiv
FIPRESCI Special Presentations, Honourable Mention	A Faithful Man	Louis Garrel
Best International Short Film	The Field	Sandhya Suri
Best International Short Film, Honourable Mention	Fuck You	Anette Sidor
Best International Short Film, Honourable Mention	This Magnificent Cake! (Ce magnifique gâteau !)	Emma de Swaef, Marc James Roels
Netpac Award for World or International Asian Film Premiere	The Third Wife	Ash Mayfair
Netpac Award, Honourable Mention	The Crossing	Bai Xue
Eurimages Audentia Award	Fig Tree	Alamork Davidian
Eurimages Audentia Award, Honourable Mention	Phoenix	Camilla Strøm Henriksen

== Juries ==
=== Platform Jury ===
- Lee Chang-dong
- Béla Tarr
- Mira Nair

=== Canadian Feature Film Jury ===
- Mathieu Denis
- Ali Özgentürk
- Michelle Shephard

=== Short Cuts Film Jury ===
- Claire Diao
- Molly McGlynn
- Michael Pearce

== Programme ==
The first slate of galas and special presentations was announced on July 24, 2018. The festival's lineup of Canadian films was announced on August 1, and the lineup for the Platform program was announced on August 8. Two days later, the Documentaries lineup was announced, with additional films added to the Midnight Madness programme. Additional films were added to respective lineups on August 14.

=== Gala presentations ===
English title	Original title	Director(s)	Production country
Beautiful Boy		Felix Van Groeningen	United States
Everybody Knows	Todos lo saben	Asghar Farhadi	Spain, France, Italy
First Man		Damien Chazelle	United States
Green Book		Peter Farrelly	United States
The Hate U Give		George Tillman Jr.	United States
Hidden Man	邪不压正	Jiang Wen	China
High Life		Claire Denis	France, Germany, Poland, United Kingdom, United States
Husband Material	Manmarziyaan	Anurag Kashyap	India
JT LeRoy		Justin Kelly	Canada, United Kingdom, United States
The Kindergarten Teacher		Sara Colangelo	United States
The Land of Steady Habits		Nicole Holofcener	United States
The Lie		Veena Sud	Canada, United States
Life Itself		Dan Fogelman	United States
Outlaw King		David Mackenzie	United Kingdom, United States
A Private War		Matthew Heineman	United States
The Public		Emilio Estevez	United States
Shadow	影	Zhang Yimou	China
A Star Is Born		Bradley Cooper	United States
What They Had		Elizabeth Chomko	United States
Widows		Steve McQueen	United States

=== Special presentations ===
English title	Original title	Director(s)	Production country
22 July		Paul Greengrass	United States
American Woman		Jake Scott	United Kingdom, United States
Anthropocene: The Human Epoch		Jennifer Baichwal, Nicholas de Pencier, Edward Burtynsky	Canada
Baby	Bao bai er	Liu Jie	China
Ben Is Back		Peter Hedges	United States
Boy Erased		Joel Edgerton	United States
Burning	Beoning	Lee Chang-dong	South Korea, Japan
Can You Ever Forgive Me?		Marielle Heller	United States
Capernaum	Cafarnaüm	Nadine Labaki	Lebanon
Cold War	Zimna wojna	Paweł Pawlikowski	Poland
Colette		Wash Westmoreland	United Kingdom, United States, Hungary
The Death and Life of John F. Donovan		Xavier Dolan	Canada
Dogman		Matteo Garrone	Italy
Driven		Nick Hamm	United Kingdom, United States
A Faithful Man	L'Homme fidèle	Louis Garrel	France
The Fall of the American Empire	La Chute de l'empire américain	Denys Arcand	Canada
The Front Runner		Jason Reitman	United States
Giant Little Ones		Keith Behrman	Canada
Girls of the Sun	Les Filles du soleil	Eva Husson	France
Gloria Bell		Sebastián Lelio	Chile, United States
Greta		Neil Jordan	Ireland, United States
The Grizzlies		Miranda de Pencier	Canada
Hold the Dark		Jeremy Saulnier	United States
Hotel Mumbai		Anthony Maras	India, Australia, United States
The Hummingbird Project		Kim Nguyen	Canada
If Beale Street Could Talk		Barry Jenkins	United States
Kursk		Thomas Vinterberg	Belgium, France, Luxembourg
Legend of the Demon Cat	Yāo Māo Zhuàn	Chen Kaige	China
Manto		Nandita Das	India
Maya		Mia Hansen-Løve	France, Germany
Mid90s		Jonah Hill	United States
A Million Little Pieces		Sam Taylor-Johnson	Canada, United States
Monsters and Men		Reinaldo Marcus Green	United States
Mothers' Instinct	Duelles	Olivier Masset-Depasse	Belgium
Mouthpiece		Patricia Rozema	Canada
Never Look Away	Werke ohne Autor	Florian Henckel von Donnersmarck	Germany
Non-Fiction	Doubles vies	Olivier Assayas	France
The Old Man & the Gun		David Lowery	United States
Papi Chulo		John Butler	United States, Ireland
The Quietude	La Quietud	Pablo Trapero	Argentina
Red Joan		Trevor Nunn	United Kingdom
Roma		Alfonso Cuarón	Mexico, United States
Shoplifters	Manbiki Kazoku	Hirokazu Kore-eda	Japan
The Sisters Brothers		Jacques Audiard	France, Spain, United States
Skin		Guy Nattiv	United States
Sunset	Napszállta	László Nemes	Hungary
Teen Spirit		Max Minghella	United States, United Kingdom
Tell It to the Bees		Annabel Jankel	United Kingdom
Through Black Spruce		Don McKellar	Canada
Viper Club		Maryam Keshavarz	United States
Vision		Naomi Kawase	Japan, France
Vita & Virginia		Chanya Button	United Kingdom, Ireland
Vox Lux		Brady Corbet	United States
The Wedding Guest		Michael Winterbottom	United Kingdom, United States
The Weekend		Stella Meghie	United States
Where Hands Touch		Amma Asante	United Kingdom, Belgium, Canada, Ireland
White Boy Rick		Yann Demange	United States
Wildlife		Paul Dano	United States
Wild Rose		Tom Harper	United Kingdom

=== Special events ===
English title	Original title	Director(s)	Production country
The Joy Luck Club		Wayne Wang	United States
Sharkwater Extinction		Rob Stewart	Canada

=== Documentaries ===
English title	Original title	Director(s)	Production country
American Dharma		Errol Morris	United Kingdom, United States
Angels Are Made of Light		James Longley	United States
The Biggest Little Farm		John Chester	United States
Carmine Street Guitars		Ron Mann	Canada
Divide and Conquer: The Story of Roger Ailes		Alexis Bloom	United States
The Elephant Queen		Victoria Stone, Mark Deeble	Kenya, United States
Fahrenheit 11/9		Michael Moore	United States
Free Solo		E. Chai Vasarhelyi, Jimmy Chin	United States
Freedom Fields		Naziha Arebi	Libya, United Kingdom
Ghost Fleet		Shannon Service, Jeffrey Waldron	United States
Graves Without a Name	Les tombeaux sans noms	Rithy Panh	France, Cambodia
Heartbound		Janus Metz Pedersen, Sine Plambech	Denmark, Netherlands, Sweden, Thailand
Maiden		Alex Holmes	United Kingdom
Maria by Callas	Maria par Callas	Tom Volf	France
Meeting Gorbachev		Werner Herzog, André Singer	Germany, United Kingdom, United States
Monrovia, Indiana		Frederick Wiseman	United States
Prosecuting Evil: The Extraordinary World of Ben Ferencz		Barry Avrich	Canada
Putin's Witnesses	Svideteli Putina	Vitaly Mansky	Latvia, Switzerland, Czech Republic, Russia, Germany, France
Quincy		Rashida Jones, Alan Hicks	United States
Reason	Vivek	Anand Patwardhan	India
Screwball		Billy Corben	United States
Searching for Ingmar Bergman	Auf der Suche nach Ingmar Bergman	Margarethe von Trotta	Germany, France
The Truth About Killer Robots		Maxim Pozdorovkin	United States
This Changes Everything		Tom Donahue	United States
Walking on Water		Andrey Paounov	Italy, Germany, United States, United Arab Emirates
What Is Democracy?		Astra Taylor	Canada
When Arabs Danced		Jawad Rhalib	Belgium, Egypt
Women Make Film		Mark Cousins	United Kingdom, Ireland

=== Contemporary World Cinema ===
English title	Original title	Director(s)	Production country
The Accused	Acusada	Gonzalo Tobal	Argentina
Angel	Un Ange	Koen Mortier	Belgium
El Angel		Luis Ortega	Argentina, Spain
Asako I & II	Netemo Sametemo	Ryūsuke Hamaguchi	Japan
Before the Frost	Før frosten	Michael Noer	Denmark
Belmonte		Federico Veiroj	Uruguay
Birds of Passage	Pájaros de verano	Cristina Gallego, Ciro Guerra	Colombia, Denmark, Mexico, Germany, France
Black '47		Lance Daly	Ireland
The Black Book	O caderno negro	Valeria Sarmiento	Portugal
Border	Gräns	Ali Abbasi	Sweden
Bulbul Can Sing		Rima Das	India
The Dive	Hatzlila	Yona Rozenkier	Israel
Donbass		Sergei Loznitsa	Germany, Ukraine, France, Netherlands, Romania
The Factory	Zavod	Yuri Bykov	Russia
Falls Around Her		Darlene Naponse	Canada
The Fireflies Are Gone	La disparition des lucioles	Sébastien Pilote	Canada
Florianópolis Dream	Sueño Florianópolis	Ana Katz	Argentina
The Great Darkened Days	La Grande noirceur	Maxime Giroux	Canada
Heart of the World	Сердце мира	Natalia Meshchaninova	Russia
I Do Not Care If We Go Down in History as Barbarians	Îmi este indiferent dacă în istorie vom intra ca barbari	Radu Jude	Romania
Jinpa		Pema Tseden	China
Kingsway		Bruce Sweeney	Canada
Let Me Fall	Lof mér að falla	Baldvin Zophoníasson	Iceland
Look at Me	Regarde-moi	Nejib Belkadhi	Tunisia, France, Qatar
Minuscule 2: Mandibles from Far Away	Minuscule 2: Les mandibules du bout du monde	Thomas Szabo, Hélène Giraud	France
The Most Beautiful Couple	Das schönste Paar	Sven Taddicken	Germany
Museum	Museo	Alonso Ruizpalacios	Mexico
Night/Ext		Ahmad Abdalla	Egypt
One Last Deal	Tuntematon mestari	Klaus Härö	Finland
The Other Story		Avi Nesher	Israel
Quién te cantará		Carlos Vermut	Spain, France
The Realm	El reino	Rodrigo Sorogoyen	Spain, France
Redemption	Geula	Boaz Yehonatan Yacov, Joseph Madmony	Israel
Retrospekt		Esther Rots	Netherlands
Roads in February	Les routes en février	Katherine Jerkovic	Canada
Rosie		Paddy Breathnach	Ireland
Les Salopes, or the Naturally Wanton Pleasure of Skin	Les salopes ou le sucre naturel de la peau	Renée Beaulieu	Canada
Sew the Winter to My Skin		Jahmil X.T. Qubeka	South Africa
Sibel		Çagla Zencirci, Guillaume Giovanetti	Turkey
Splinters		Thom Fitzgerald	Canada
Stupid Young Heart	Hölmö nuori sydän	Selma Vilhunen	Finland
Styx		Wolfgang Fischer	Germany, Austria
The Sweet Requiem	Kyoyang Ngarmo	Ritu Sarin, Tenzing Sonam	India, United States
That Time of Year	Den tid på året	Paprika Steen	Denmark
Ulysses & Mona	Ulysse & Mona	Sébastien Betbeder	France
The Vice of Hope	Il vizio della speranza	Edoardo De Angelis	Italy
Winter Flies	Všechno bude	Olmo Omerzu	Czech Republic, Slovakia, Poland, Slovenia
Working Woman		Michal Aviad	Israel

=== Discovery ===
English title	Original title	Director(s)	Production country
Akasha		Hajooj Kuka	Sudan
Aniara		Pella Kågerman, Hugo Lilja	Sweden, Denmark
Blind Spot	Blindsone	Tuva Novotny	Norway
The Chambermaid	La Camarista	Lila Avilés	Mexico
Clara		Akash Sherman	Canada, United Kingdom
Complicity		Kei Chikaura	Japan, China, France
Consequences	Posledice	Darko Štante	Slovenia, Austria
The Crossing	Guo chun tian	Bai Xue	China
The Day I Lost My Shadow	Yom Adaatou Zouli	Soudade Kaadan	Syria, France, Lebanon, Qatar
The Dig		Andy Tohill, Ryan Tohill	Ireland, United Kingdom
Edge of the Knife	SG̲aawaay Ḵ'uuna	Gwaai Edenshaw, Helen Haig-Brown	Canada
An Elephant Sitting Still	Dà Xiàng Xídì Érzuò	Hu Bo	China
Emu Runner		Imogen Thomas	Australia
Ever After	Endzeit	Carolina Hellsgård	Germany
The Extraordinary Journey of Celeste Garcia	El viaje extraordinario de Celeste García	Arturo Infante	Cuba, Germany
Farming		Adewale Akinnuoye-Agbaje	United Kingdom
Fig Tree		Alamork Davidian	Ethiopia, France, Germany, Israel
Firecrackers		Jasmin Mozaffari	Canada
Float Like a Butterfly		Carmel Winters	Ireland
Freaks		Zach Lipovsky, Adam Stein	Canada
Girl		Lukas Dhont	Belgium
Gwen		William McGregor	United Kingdom
Helmet Heads	Cascos indomables	Neto Villalobos	Costa Rica, Chile
Her Job	I douleia tis	Nikos Labôt	Greece, France, Serbia
Icebox		Daniel Sawka	United States
Jirga	جرګه	Benjamin Gilmour	Australia
Light as Feathers		Rosanne Pel	Netherlands
Lionheart		Genevieve Nnaji	Nigeria
The Load	Teret	Ognjen Glavonić	Serbia, France, Croatia, Iran, Qatar
Manta Ray	Kraben Rahu	Phuttiphong Aroonpheng	Thailand
The Mercy of the Jungle	La Miséricorde de la Jungle	Joël Karekezi	Belgium, France, Rwanda, Germany
Orange Days	Rooz-haye Narenji	Arash Lahooti	Iran
Our Body	아워 바디	Han Ka-ram	South Korea
Parade		Nino Zhvania	Georgia
Phoenix	Føniks	Camilla Strøm Henriksen	Norway
Rafiki		Wanuri Kahiu	Kenya
Saf		Ali Vatansever	Turkey, Germany, Romania
Screwdriver	Mafak	Bassam Jarbawi	Palestine, United States, Qatar
Summer Survivors	Išgyventi vasarą	Marija Kavtaradzė	Lithuania
Tel Aviv on Fire	Tel Aviv Al Ha'Esh	Sameh Zoabi	Israel, Luxembourg, Belgium, France
The Third Wife	Vợ ba	Ash Mayfair	Vietnam
Tito and the Birds	Tito e os Pássaros	Gabriel Bitar, André Catoto, Gustavo Steinberg	Brazil
Too Late to Die Young	Tarde para morir joven	Dominga Sotomayor Castillo	Chile
Touch Me Not	Nu mă atinge	Adina Pintilie	Romania, Germany, Czech Republic, France, Bulgaria
Twin Flower	Fiore gemello	Laura Luchetti	Italy
Woman at War	Kona fer í stríð	Benedikt Erlingsson	Iceland, France, Ukraine

=== Masters ===
English title	Original title	Director(s)	Production country
3 Faces	Se rokh	Jafar Panahi	Iran
Ash Is Purest White	江湖儿女	Jia Zhang-ke	China
Divine Wind	Rih rabani	Merzak Allouache	Algeria, France, Qatar, Lebanon
Hotel by the River	Gangbyeon hotel	Hong Sang-soo	South Korea
The Image Book	Le Livre d'image	Jean-Luc Godard	Switzerland, France
Killing	Zan	Shinya Tsukamoto	Japan
Loro		Paolo Sorrentino	Italy, France, United States
Our Time	Nuestro tiempo	Carlos Reygadas	Mexico
Peterloo		Mike Leigh	United Kingdom
Transit		Christian Petzold	Germany
The Wild Pear Tree	Ahlat Ağacı	Nuri Bilge Ceylan	Turkey

=== Midnight Madness ===
English title	Original title	Director(s)	Production country
Assassination Nation		Sam Levinson	United States
Climax		Gaspar Noé	Belgium, France
Diamantino		Gabriel Abrantes, Daniel Schmidt	Portugal, France, Brazil
Halloween		David Gordon Green	United States
In Fabric		Peter Strickland	United Kingdom
The Man Who Feels No Pain	Mard Ko Dard Nahi Hota	Vasan Bala	India
Nekrotronic		Kiah Roache-Turner	Australia
The Predator		Shane Black	United States
The Standoff at Sparrow Creek		Henry Dunham	United States
The Wind		Emma Tammi	United States

=== Platform ===
English title	Original title	Director(s)	Production country
Angelo		Markus Schleinzer	Austria, Luxembourg
Cities of Last Things	幸福城市	Ho Wi Ding	Taiwan, China, France, United States
Destroyer		Karyn Kusama	United States
Donnybrook		Tim Sutton	United States, France
The Good Girls	Las niñas bien	Alejandra Márquez Abella	Mexico
Her Smell		Alex Ross Perry	United States
The Innocent	Der Unschuldige	Simon Jaquemet	Switzerland, Germany
Jessica Forever		Caroline Poggi, Jonathan Vinel	France
Lady J	Mademoiselle de Joncquières	Emmanuel Mouret	France
Out of Blue		Carol Morley	United Kingdom, United States
The River	Ózen	Emir Baigazin	Kazakhstan
Rojo		Benjamín Naishtat	Argentina

=== Short Cuts ===
English title	Original title	Director(s)	Production country
7A		Zack Russell	Canada
Accidence		Guy Maddin, Evan Johnson, Galen Johnson	Canada
All Inclusive		Corina Schwingruber Ilic	Switzerland
All These Creatures		Charles Williams	Australia
The Ambassador's Wife		Theresa Traore Dahlberg	Burkina Faso, Sweden
Animal Behaviour		Alison Snowden, David Fine	Canada
Ballad of Blood and Two White Buckets		Yosep Anggi Noen	Indonesia
Bavure		Donato Sansone	France
Biidaaban (The Dawn Comes)		Amanda Strong	Canada
Birdie		Shelly Lauman	Australia
Brotherhood	Ikhwène	Meryam Joobeur	Canada
The Call	Telefonul	Anca Damian	Romania
Caroni		Ian Harnarine	Canada
Circle		Jayisha Patel	United Kingdom, Canada, India
Dodgy Dave		Charlotte Regan	United Kingdom
Dulce		Guille Isa, Angello Faccini	Colombia, United States
Dziadzio		Aaron Ries	Canada
Emptying the Tank		Caroline Monnet	Canada
Everything Calms Down	Todo se calma	Virginia Scaro	Argentina
EXIT		Claire Edmondson	Canada
Facing North	Bukiikakkono	Tukei Muhumuza	United States, Uganda
The Fall	La Chute	Boris Labbé	France
Fauve		Jérémy Comte	Canada
Feathers		A.V. Rockwell	United States
The Field		Sandhya Suri	France, India, United Kingdom
The Foreign Body	El Destetado	Héctor Silva Núñez	Venezuela, France
Fuck You		Anette Sidor	Sweden
Girlfriends	Amies	Marie Davignon	Canada
Glitter's Wild Women		Roney	Canada
Good Boy		Fantavious Fritz	Canada
Guaxuma		Nara Normande	France, Brazil
Hector Malot: The Last Day of the Year	Ektoras Malo: I Teleftea Mera Tis Chronias	Jacqueline Lentzou	Greece
If This Isn't Love	Si ce n'est pas de l'amour	Luiza Cocora	Canada
The Imminent Immanent	Baga't Diri Tuhay Ta't Pamahungpahung	Carlo Francisco Manatad	Philippines, Singapore
Interior		Reed Van Dyk	Norway, United States
Judgement		Raymund Ribay Gutierrez	Philippines
Little Waves	Les petites vagues	Ariane Louis-Seize	Canada
Lou		Clara Balzary	United States
My Boy	Mon Boy	Sarah Pellerin	Canada
A New Year	Akhali Tseli	George Sikharulidze	Georgia
Norman Norman		Sophy Romvari	Canada
Old Thing	Ha'Alte-Zachen	Roni Bahat	Israel
The Orphan	O Órfão	Carolina Markowicz	Brazil
Paseo		Matthew Hannam	Canada
Reneepoptosis		Renee Zhan	Japan, United States
Shadow Cut		Lucy Suess	New Zealand
Shinaab: Part II		Lyle Corbine Jr.	United States
The Subject	Le sujet	Patrick Bouchard	Canada
The Summer and All the Rest	L'été et tout le reste	Sven Bresser	Netherlands
This Magnificent Cake!	Ce magnifique gâteau !	Emma de Swaef, Marc James Roels	Belgium, France, Netherlands
To Plant a Flag		Bobbie Peers	Norway, Iceland
Umbra	Tariki	Saeed Jafarian	Iran
Veslemøy's Song		Sofia Bohdanowicz	Canada
Viktoría		Brúsi Ólason	Iceland
A Wedding Day	Un jour de mariage	Élias Belkeddar	Algeria, France
Winners Bitch		Sam Gurry	United States

=== Wavelengths ===
English title	Original title	Director(s)	Production country
Altiplano		Malena Szlam	Canada, Chile
ante mis ojos		Lina Rodriguez	Canada
Dead Souls	死灵魂	Wang Bing	China
Erased, Ascent of the Invisible	Tirss, rihlat alsoo'oud ila almar'i	Ghassan Halwani	Lebanon
Fausto		Andrea Bussmann	Canada
In My Room		Ulrich Köhler	Germany
La Flor		Mariano Llinás	Argentina
Long Day's Journey into Night	Dìqiú Zuìhòu de Yèwǎn	Bi Gan	China, France
The Grand Bizarre		Jodie Mack	United States
Ray & Liz		Richard Billingham	United Kingdom
Sira		Rolla Tahir	Canada, Egypt
Slip		Celia Perrin Sidarous	Canada
The Stone Speakers		Igor Drljaca	Canada
The Trial	Процесс	Sergei Loznitsa	Netherlands, Russia
What You Gonna Do When the World's on Fire?		Roberto Minervini	Italy

=== Primetime ===
English title	Original title	Director(s)	Production country
Ad Vitam		Sébastien Mounier	France
Folklore		Eric Khoo	Indonesia, Japan, Thailand, Malaysia, Singapore, South Korea
Homecoming		Eli Horowitz, Micah Bloomberg	United States
Sorry for Your Loss		Kit Steinkellner	United States
Stockholm		Noa Yedlin	Israel

== Canada's Top Ten ==
TIFF's annual Canada's Top Ten list, of the films selected by festival programmers as the year's ten best Canadian feature and short films, was released on December 5.

Unlike in prior years, the films selected for the Top Ten list were not screened at a dedicated festival in January 2019, but instead each received its own standalone theatrical run at the TIFF Bell Lightbox throughout the year.

=== Feature films ===
- Anthropocene: The Human Epoch — Jennifer Baichwal, Nicholas de Pencier, Edward Burtynsky
- Edge of the Knife — Gwaai Edenshaw, Helen Haig-Brown
- Firecrackers — Jasmin Mozaffari
- The Fireflies Are Gone (La disparition des lucioles) — Sébastien Pilote
- Freaks — Zach Lipovsky, Adam Stein
- Genesis (Genèse) — Philippe Lesage
- Giant Little Ones — Keith Behrman
- Mouthpiece — Patricia Rozema
- Roads in February — Katherine Jerkovic
- What Walaa Wants — Christy Garland

=== Short films ===
- Accidence — Guy Maddin, Evan Johnson, Galen Johnson
- Altiplano — Malena Szlam
- Biidaaban (The Dawn Comes) — Amanda Strong
- Brotherhood (Ikhwène) — Meryam Joobeur
- Fauve — Jérémy Comte
- Little Waves (Les petites vagues) — Ariane Louis-Seize
- My Dead Dad's Porno Tapes — Charlie Tyrell
- Paseo — Matthew Hannam
- The Subject — Patrick Bouchard
- Veslemøy's Song — Sofia Bohdanowicz
