= Vancouver Film Critics Circle Awards 2018 =

Annual Canadian film awards ceremony

The nominations for the 19th Vancouver Film Critics Circle Awards, honoring the best in filmmaking in 2018, were announced on December 12, 2018. The Favourite led with six nominations.

The winners were announced on December 17, 2018. Roma won two awards, including Best Film, while First Reformed secured the most wins with three, including Best Director and Actor.

== Winners and nominees ==
=== International ===
Best Film

- Roma
- The Favourite
- First Reformed

Best Director

- Paul Schrader – First Reformed
- Alfonso Cuarón – Roma
- Yorgos Lanthimos - The Favourite

Best Actor

- Ethan Hawke – First Reformed
- Christian Bale – Vice
- Viggo Mortensen – Green Book

Best Actress

- Olivia Colman – The Favourite (TIE)
- Regina Hall – Support the Girls (TIE)
- Melissa McCarthy – Can You Ever Forgive Me? (TIE)

Best Supporting Actor

- Richard E. Grant – Can You Ever Forgive Me?
- Mahershala Ali – Green Book
- Peter Bogdanovich – The Other Side of the Wind
- Steven Yeun – Burning

Best Supporting Actress

- Rachel Weisz – The Favourite
- Claire Foy – First Man
- Emma Stone – The Favourite

Best Screenplay

- Paul Schrader – First Reformed
- Bo Burnham – Eighth Grade
- Deborah Davis and Tony McNamara – The Favourite

Best Foreign-Language Film

- Roma
- Burning
- Shoplifters

Best Documentary

- Minding the Gap
- Free Solo
- Won't You Be My Neighbor?

=== Canadian ===
Best Canadian Film

- Edge of the Knife
- Fausto
- Roads in February (Les routes en février)

Best Director of a Canadian Film

- Gwaai Edenshaw and Helen Haig-Brown – Edge of the Knife
- Andrea Bussmann – Fausto
- Katherine Jerkovic – Roads in February (Les routes en février)
- Philippe Lesage – Genesis (Genèse)

Best Actor in a Canadian Film

- Tyler York – Edge of the Knife
- Théodore Pellerin – Genesis (Genèse)
- Josh Wiggins – Giant Little Ones

Best Actress in a Canadian Film

- Arlen Aguayo-Stewart – Roads in February (Les routes en février)
- Troian Bellisario – Clara
- Jennifer Hardy CK – Spice It Up
- Michaela Kurimsky – Firecrackers

Best Supporting Actor in a Canadian Film

- Aaron Read – When the Storm Fades
- Pierre-Luc Brillant – The Fireflies Are Gone (La disparition des lucioles)
- William Russ – Edge of the Knife

Best Supporting Actress in a Canadian Film

- Kayla Lorette – When the Storm Fades
- Gloria Demassi – Roads in February (Les routes en février)
- Gabrielle Rose – Kingsway

Best Screenplay for a Canadian Film

- Keith Behrman – Giant Little Ones
- Zebulon Zang – N.O.N.
- Katherine Jerkovic – Roads in February (Les routes en février)

Best Canadian Documentary

- Anthropocene: The Human Epoch
- The Museum of Forgotten Triumphs
- What Is Democracy?

One to Watch

- Katherine Jerkovic – Roads in February (Les routes en février)
- Akash Sherman – Clara
- Jasmin Mozaffari – Firecrackers
- Drew Lint – M/M

Best British Columbia Film

- Edge of the Knife
- N.O.N.
- This Mountain Life
- When the Storm Fades
