= Vancouver Film Critics Circle Award for Best Canadian Film =

Canadian film award

The winners of the Vancouver Film Critics Circle Award for Best Canadian Film are listed below:

== Winners ==
=== 2000s ===
Year	Film	Director	Ref.
2000	Maelström	Denis Villeneuve	
2000	New Waterford Girl	Allan Moyle	
2000	waydowntown	Gary Burns	
2001	Last Wedding	Bruce Sweeney	
2001	Ginger Snaps	John Fawcett	
2001	Mile Zero	Andrew Currie	
2001	Lost and Delirious	Léa Pool	
2002	Flower & Garnet	Keith Behrman	
2002	Ararat	Atom Egoyan	
2002	Bollywood/Hollywood	Deepa Mehta	
2003	The Barbarian Invasions (Les Invasions barbares)	Denys Arcand	
2003	Falling Angels	Scott Smith	
2003	Owning Mahowny	Richard Kwietniowski	
2004	Childstar	Don McKellar	
2004	Festival Express	Bob Smeaton	
2004	Scared Sacred	Velcrow Ripper	
2004	A Silent Love	Federico Hidalgo	
2005	C.R.A.Z.Y.	Jean-Marc Vallée	
2005	It's All Gone Pete Tong	Michael Dowse	
2005	Water	Deepa Mehta	
2006	The Rocket (Maurice Richard)	Charles Binamé	
2006	Away from Her	Sarah Polley	
2006	Manufactured Landscapes	Jennifer Baichwal	
2006	Monkey Warfare	Reginald Harkema	
2007	Eastern Promises	David Cronenberg	
2007	My Winnipeg	Guy Maddin	
2007	Up the Yangtze	Yung Chang	
2008	It's Not Me, I Swear! (C'est pas moi, je le jure!)	Philippe Falardeau	
2008	Heaven on Earth	Deepa Mehta	
2008	The Necessities of Life	Benoît Pilon	
2009	I Killed My Mother (J'ai tué ma mère)	Xavier Dolan	
2009	Polytechnique	Denis Villeneuve	
2009	The Young Victoria	Jean-Marc Vallée	

=== 2010s ===
Year	Film	Director	Ref.
2010	Incendies	Denis Villeneuve	
2010	Last Train Home	Lixin Fan	
2010	Trigger	Bruce McDonald	
2011	Café de Flore	Jean-Marc Vallée	
2011	Small Town Murder Songs	Ed Gass-Donnelly	
2011	Starbuck	Ken Scott	
2012	War Witch (Rebelle)	Kim Nguyen	
2012	Cosmopolis	David Cronenberg	
2012	Stories We Tell	Sarah Polley	
2013	The Dirties	Matt Johnson	
2013	Gabrielle	Louise Archambault	
2013	Watermark	Jennifer Baichwal, Edward Burtynsky	
2014	You're Sleeping Nicole (Tu dors Nicole)	Stéphane Lafleur	
2014	Enemy	Denis Villeneuve	
2014	Mommy	Xavier Dolan	
2015	Room	Lenny Abrahamson	
2015	The Forbidden Room	Guy Maddin	
2015	Sleeping Giant	Andrew Cividino	
2016	Hello Destroyer	Kevan Funk	
2016	Werewolf	Ashley McKenzie	
2016	Window Horses	Ann Marie Fleming	
2017	Never Steady, Never Still	Kathleen Hepburn	
2017	Black Cop	Cory Bowles	
2017	Fail to Appear	Antoine Bourges	
2018	Edge of the Knife	Gwaai Edenshaw, Helen Haig-Brown	
2018	Fausto	Andrea Bussmann	
2018	Roads in February (Les routes en février)	Katherine Jerkovic	
2019	The Body Remembers When the World Broke Open	Kathleen Hepburn and Elle-Máijá Tailfeathers	
2019	Anne at 13,000 Ft.	Kazik Radwanski	
2019	The Twentieth Century	Matthew Rankin	

=== 2020s ===
Year	Film	Director	Ref.
2020	Violation	Madeleine Sims-Fewer and Dusty Mancinelli	
2020	The Nest	Sean Durkin	
2020	Possessor	Brandon Cronenberg	
2021	All My Puny Sorrows	Michael McGowan	
2021	Night Raiders	Danis Goulet	
2021	Scarborough	Shasha Nakhai, Rich Williamson	
2022	I Like Movies	Chandler Levack	
2022	Eternal Spring	Jason Loftus	
2022	Riceboy Sleeps	Anthony Shim	
2023	BlackBerry	Matt Johnson	
2023	Humanist Vampire Seeking Consenting Suicidal Person (Vampire humaniste cherche suicidaire consentant)	Ariane Louis-Seize	
2023	To Kill a Tiger	Nisha Pahuja	
2024	My Old Ass	Megan Park	
2024	40 Acres	R. T. Thorne	
2024	Can I Get a Witness?	Ann Marie Fleming	
2024	Rumours	Guy Maddin	
2025	Nirvanna the Band the Show the Movie	Matt Johnson	
2025	Mile End Kicks	Chandler Levack	
2025	Wrong Husband (Uiksaringitara)	Zacharias Kunuk	
