= Vancouver Film Critics Circle Award for Best Director of a Canadian Film =

Canadian film award

The Vancouver Film Critics Circle Award for Best Director Canadian Film is an annual award given by the Vancouver Film Critics Circle.

== Winners ==
=== 2000s ===
| Year | Director(s) | Film(s) | Reference |
|---|---|---|---|
| 2000 | Denis Villeneuve | Maelström | |
| 2000 | Gary Burns | waydowntown | |
| 2000 | Scott Smith | Rollercoaster | |
| 2001 | Bruce Sweeney | Last Wedding | |
| 2001 | Andrew Currie | Mile Zero | |
| 2001 | Léa Pool | Lost and Delirious | |
| 2002 | Keith Behrman | Flower & Garnet | |
| 2002 | Guy Bennett | Punch | |
| 2002 | Atom Egoyan | Ararat | |
| 2002 | Deepa Mehta | Bollywood/Hollywood | |
| 2003 | Denys Arcand | The Barbarian Invasions (Les Invasions barbares) | |
| 2003 | Nathaniel Geary | On the Corner | |
| 2003 | Scott Smith | Falling Angels | |
| 2004 | Don McKellar | Childstar | |
| 2004 | Daniel MacIvor | Wilby Wonderful | |
| 2004 | Peter Raymont | Shake Hands with the Devil: The Journey of Roméo Dallaire | |
| 2004 | Velcrow Ripper | Scared Sacred | |
| 2005 | Deepa Mehta | Water | |
| 2005 | Michael Dowse | It's All Gone Pete Tong | |
| 2005 | Jean-Marc Vallée | C.R.A.Z.Y. | |
| 2006 | Reginald Harkema | Monkey Warfare | |
| 2006 | Andrew Currie | Fido | |
| 2006 | Sarah Polley | Away from Her | |
| 2007 | David Cronenberg | Eastern Promises | |
| 2007 | Guy Maddin | My Winnipeg | |
| 2007 | Roger Spottiswoode | Shake Hands with the Devil | |
| 2008 | Philippe Falardeau | It's Not Me, I Swear! (C'est pas moi, je le jure!) | |
| 2008 | Atom Egoyan | Adoration | |
| 2008 | Deepa Mehta | Heaven on Earth | |
| 2009 | Xavier Dolan | I Killed My Mother (J'ai tué ma mère) | |
| 2009 | Cherien Dabis | Amreeka | |
| 2009 | Denis Villeneuve | Polytechnique | |

=== 2010s ===
| Year | Director(s) | Film(s) | Reference |
|---|---|---|---|
| 2010 | Denis Villeneuve | Incendies | |
| 2010 | Denis Côté | Curling | |
| 2010 | Bruce McDonald | Trigger | |
| 2011 | David Cronenberg | A Dangerous Method | |
| 2011 | Ed Gass-Donnelly | Small Town Murder Songs | |
| 2011 | Ken Scott | Starbuck | |
| 2011 | Jean-Marc Vallée | Café de Flore | |
| 2012 | Panos Cosmatos | Beyond the Black Rainbow | |
| 2012 | David Cronenberg | Cosmopolis | |
| 2012 | Sarah Polley | Stories We Tell | |
| 2013 | Jeff Barnaby | Rhymes for Young Ghouls | |
| 2013 | Louise Archambault | Gabrielle | |
| 2013 | Matt Johnson | The Dirties | |
| 2014 | Denis Villeneuve | Enemy | |
| 2014 | Xavier Dolan | Mommy | |
| 2014 | Stéphane Lafleur | You're Sleeping Nicole (Tu dors Nicole) | |
| 2015 | Andrew Cividino | Sleeping Giant | |
| 2015 | Lenny Abrahamson | Room | |
| 2015 | Atom Egoyan | Remember | |
| 2016 | Kevan Funk | Hello Destroyer | |
| 2016 | Ashley McKenzie | Werewolf | |
| 2016 | Isiah Medina | 88:88 | |
| 2017 | Kathleen Hepburn | Never Steady, Never Still | |
| 2017 | Sofia Bohdanowicz | Maison du Bonheur | |
| 2017 | Denis Côté | A Skin So Soft (Ta peau si lisse) | |
| 2018 | Gwaai Edenshaw, Helen Haig-Brown | Edge of the Knife | |
| 2018 | Andrea Bussmann | Fausto | |
| 2018 | Katherine Jerkovic | Roads in February (Les routes en février) | |
| 2018 | Philippe Lesage | Genesis (Genèse) | |
| 2019 | Kathleen Hepburn and Elle-Máijá Tailfeathers | The Body Remembers When the World Broke Open | |
| 2019 | Kazik Radwanski | Anne at 13,000 Ft. | |
| 2019 | Matthew Rankin | The Twentieth Century | |

=== 2020s ===
| Year | Director(s) | Film(s) | Ref. |
|---|---|---|---|
| 2020 | Brandon Cronenberg | Possessor | |
| 2020 | Sean Durkin | The Nest | |
| 2020 | Madeleine Sims-Fewer and Dusty Mancinelli | Violation | |
| 2021 | Danis Goulet | Night Raiders | |
| 2021 | Michael McGowan | All My Puny Sorrows | |
| 2021 | Shasha Nakhai, Rich Williamson | Scarborough | |
| 2022 | Sarah Polley | Women Talking | |
| 2022 | Jason Loftus | Eternal Spring | |
| 2022 | Anthony Shim | Riceboy Sleeps | |
| 2022 | Clement Virgo | Brother | |
| 2023 | Matt Johnson | BlackBerry | |
| 2023 | Atom Egoyan | Seven Veils | |
| 2023 | Nisha Pahuja | To Kill a Tiger | |
| 2024 | Ann Marie Fleming | Can I Get a Witness? | |
| 2024 | Megan Park | My Old Ass | |
| 2024 | R. T. Thorne | 40 Acres | |
| 2025 | Matt Johnson | Nirvanna the Band the Show the Movie | |
| 2025 | Zacharias Kunuk | Wrong Husband (Uiksaringitara) | |
| 2025 | Chandler Levack | Mile End Kicks | |
