= It's My Time (film) =

2026 Chinese-Hong Kong film by Bai Xue

- Chinese: 魔方小姐
- Literal meaning: Lady Rubik's Cube
- Hanyu Pinyin: Mófāng xiǎojiě
- Directed by: Bai Xue
- Written by: Bai Xue; Sun Yan; Xu Yizhou
- Produced by: Michelle Yeoh; Liu Mingyi; Gao Shan
- Starring: Michelle Yeoh; Liu Haoran; Sa Rina; Nicole Crewe; Bai Ke; Han Tongsheng; Qi Xi; Liu Yang
- Production companies: General Dream Studio; Shanghai Maoyan Pictures; Media Asia Film
- Distributed by: Shanghai Maoyan Pictures; Media Asia Film Distribution
- Release date: June 30, 2026
- Running time: 107 minutes
- Countries: China; Hong Kong
- Languages: Mandarin; Cantonese; English
- Box office: US$2.3 million

It's My Time (Note: Also known as This Is My Time.) (Chinese: 魔方小姐) is a 2026 sports drama film directed and co-written by Bai Xue, with Wen Muye serving as the executive producer. A Chinese-Hong Kong co-production, it stars Michelle Yeoh and Liu Haoran in the leading roles, alongside Sa Rina, Bai Ke, Han Tongsheng, Qi Xi and Liu Yang. Based on a true story, the film follows a woman in her seventies who, unwilling to settle for a monotonous life in a nursing home, embarks on a new chapter after unexpectedly discovering her talent for solving Rubik's Cubes. The film marks Michelle Yeoh's first Chinese film project since winning the Academy Award for Best Actress in 2023.

It's My Time was released in mainland China by Shanghai Maoyan Pictures on June 30, 2026.

== Plot ==
Zhao Yanhong, a strong-willed and rebellious 70-year-old senior, frequently stirs up trouble and causes amusing incidents at her nursing home. By chance, she meets Wu Youwei, a down-on-his-luck former Rubik's Cube world champion who operates a night market stall, and the two form an unlikely bond. Establishing a mentor-student relationship with the younger Wu, Zhao uses the Rubik's Cube to defy aging and fate. The two compete in Rubik's Cube competitions, leading Zhao to rediscover a sense of purpose later in life.

== Cast ==
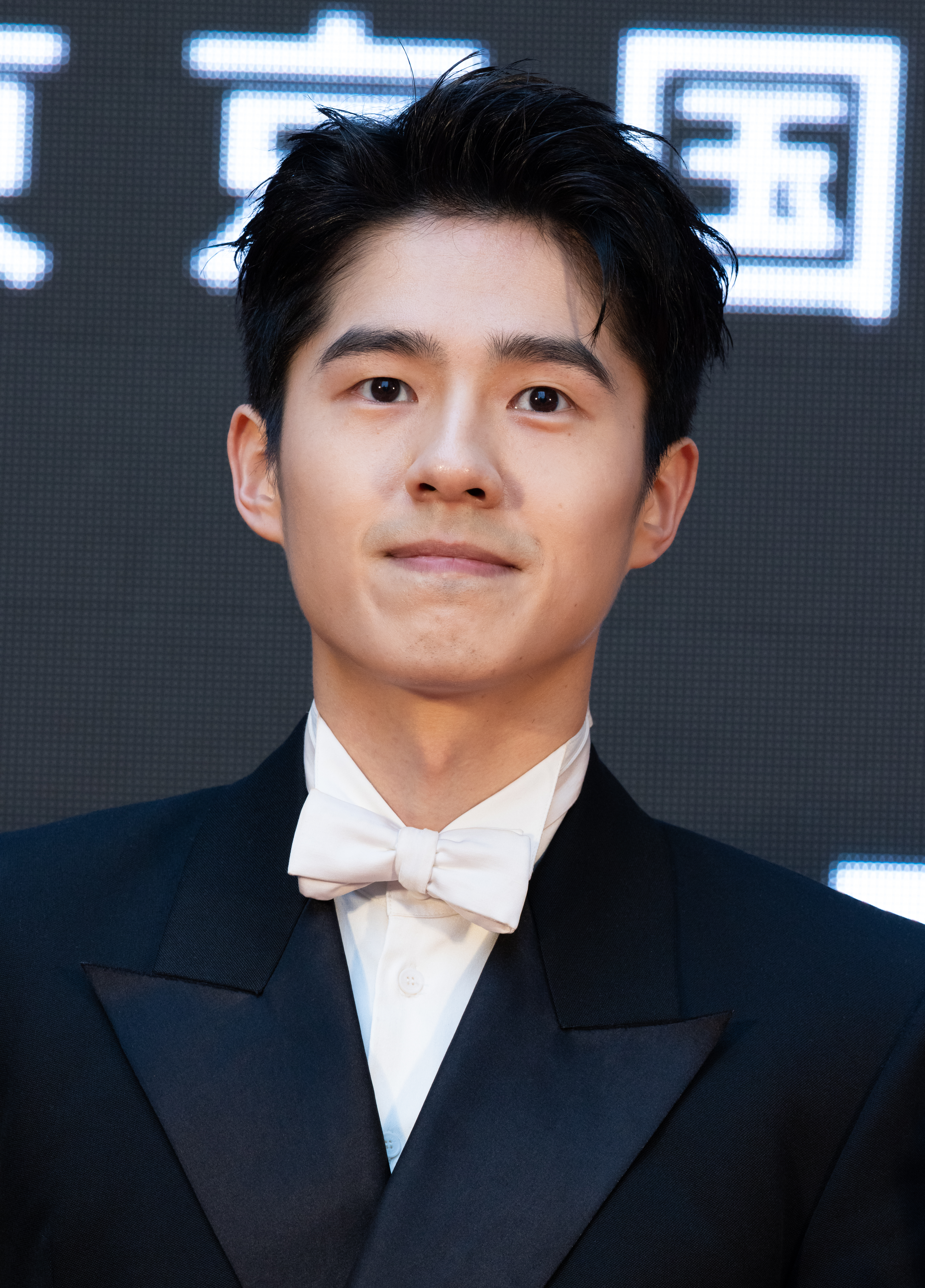
Michelle Yeoh (left) and Liu Haoran (right) respectively portray Zhao Yanhong and Wu Youwei.
- Michelle Yeoh as Zhao Yanhong, a 70-year-old woman who was admitted to a nursing home
- Liu Haoran as Wu Youwei, a former Rubik's Cube World Champion who, by a twist of fate, became Zhao's coach
- Sa Rina as Shuzhen, a longtime friend of Zhao, who lives with her at the nursing home
- Bai Ke as Dong Dawei, Zhao's son
- Han Tongsheng as Laowan, a resident at the nursing home
- Qi Xi as Manting, Dong's wife
- Liu Yang as Boss Hu, head of an MCN company
- Tian Yu as Director Zheng, the director of Zhao's nursing home
- Huang Yao as Zhao Yanhong as a young woman
- Chen Halin as Zhao Yanhong as a teenager
- Jiang Qiming as K Shen, an expert of Rubik's Cube
- Jin Jing as Mother of Wang Tianze
- Wu Hankun as Xiao Cui
- Liang Zhi as a host of a reality show
- Nicole Crewe as a reporter from WCC

== Production ==
=== Development ===
It's My Time is based on the real-life story of Zhao Wenying (赵文英), a retired teacher from Jinyun, Lishui, Zhejiang. Zhao began learning to solve Rubik's Cubes in 2014 after being inspired by her granddaughter. In December 2019, she successfully achieved a World Record Certification (WRCAC) by solving a 3x3x3 Rubik's Cube blindfolded in 3 minutes and 33 seconds, becoming the fastest individual over the age of 60 to accomplish the feat. Her journey serves as the biographical foundation for the film's protagonist, Zhao Yanhong.

The project marks the second feature film directed by Bai Xue, following her directorial debut The Crossing (2018). Bai co-wrote the screenplay alongside Sun Yan and Xu Yizhou. According to Bai, she had conducted several in-depth interviews with Zhao Wenying, and the lead role of the 70-year-old "rebellious" grandmother was specifically written and tailored for Michelle Yeoh. The film also marks a major return for Yeoh, who served as chief producer and lead actress in her first Chinese-language cinema production since winning the Academy Award for Best Actress for Everything Everywhere All at Once (2022). Noted filmmaker Wen Muye, known for Dying to Survive (2019), served as the film's executive producer.

=== Casting ===
The film's core cast was officially revealed on August 7, 2025, alongside the release of its first promotional poster. The leading roles were assigned to Michelle Yeoh and Liu Haoran, representing their first on-screen collaboration. Liu Haoran was cast as Wu Youwei, a former Rubik's Cube world champion who reluctantly becomes Zhao's coach. The supporting cast includes veteran actress Sa Rina as Shuzhen, Zhao's closest companion in the nursing home. A key emotional scene in the film, where the two characters apply nail polish together, was developed as a spontaneous on-set improvisation by the actresses in cooperation with the directing team.

=== Filming ===
The film was officially filed and registered under the working title Lady R (魔方奶奶; 'Grandma Rubik's Cube') by Shanghai-based General Dream Studio in April 2023 and commenced principal photography in May 2025, with on-site filming taking place in Foshan and Guangzhou. On August 7, 2025, the film released its first teaser poster and announced that filming had been completed. In April 2026, the film was re-registered as a co-production under its current title by General Dream Studio and Hong Kong's Media Asia Film.

== Release ==
On June 13, 2026, the film's cast and crew made an appearance at the opening ceremony of the 28th Shanghai International Film Festival. The first round of preview screenings for It's My Time were held from June 19 to 21 in 38 select cities of China, while the second round was expanded to a nationwide scale from June 22 to 28.

It's My Time was originally scheduled to be released in mainland China by Shanghai Maoyan Pictures on July 3, 2026, but the release date was later moved up to June 30. The film will be released by Media Asia Film in Hong Kong within the year. The film is also scheduled for release in international markets, with Media Asia handling sales.
