= Edge of the Knife =

2018 Haida-language film

- Official film poster
- Haida: SG̲aawaay Ḵʹuuna
- Directed by: Gwaai Edenshaw; Helen Haig-Brown
- Written by: Gwaai Edenshaw; Jaalen Edenshaw; Graham Richard; Leonie Sandercock
- Produced by: Jonathan Frantz; Stephen Grosse
- Starring: Tyler York; William Russ; Adeana Young
- Cinematography: Jonathan Frantz
- Edited by: Sarah Hedar
- Music by: Kinnie Starr
- Production company: Niijang Xyaalas Productions
- Distributed by: Isuma
- Release dates: 1 September 2018 (Haida Gwaii); 7 September 2018 (Toronto)
- Running time: 100 minutes
- Country: Canada
- Languages: Haida (with English subtitles)
- Budget: CA$1,890,000

Edge of the Knife (Haida: SG̲aawaay Ḵ'uuna, [sɢ̥aːwaːj qʼuːna]) is a 2018 Canadian drama film co-directed by Gwaai Edenshaw and Helen Haig-Brown. It is the first feature film spoken only in the Haida language. Set in 19th-century Haida Gwaii, it tells the classic Haida story of a traumatized and stranded man transformed into Gaagiixiid, the wildman.

With input from Haida Gwaii residents, the screenplay was written in 2015 by Gwaai and Jaalen Edenshaw, Graham Richard, and Leonie Sandercock with an aim to preserve and teach Haida, an endangered language. Contributors to the film's budget of CA$1,890,000 included the Council of the Haida Nation, the Canada Media Fund, and Telefilm Canada. The film was created primarily by indigenous people, including the co-directors, a mostly amateur crew, and the Haida cast. In 2017, the actors were taught to speak Haida at a two-week training camp and throughout the five weeks of filming.

First shown on 1 September 2018 to residents of Haida Gwaii, who the film's creators said were the primary audience, Edge of the Knife made its public premiere six days later at the 2018 Toronto International Film Festival, which named the film in its annual Canada's Top Ten list.

== Plot ==
In a 19th-century summer, two large families gather for their annual fishing retreat on the far-removed island of Haida Gwaii. Adiitsʹii, a charming nobleman, causes the accidental death of his best friend Kwa's son and hastens into the wilderness. Adiitsʹii is tormented by what he has done and spirals into insanity, becoming Gaagiixiid, a supernatural being crazed by hunger. He unexpectedly survives the winter, and at next year's gathering, the families try to convert Gaagiixiid, back to Adiitsʹii, while Kwa also wrestles with a desire for revenge.

== Production ==
=== Development ===
The secrets of who we are are wrapped up in our language. It’s how we think. How we label our world around us. It's also a resistance to what was imposed on us.

— Gwaai Edenshaw, co-writer and co-director

The idea to make Edge of the Knife came from University of British Columbia professor Leonie Sandercock and Haida Gwaii community organizers who wanted to encourage learning Haida, classified as an endangered language with fewer than 20 speakers at the time of the movie's production. After an idea submission contest, Haida brothers Gwaai and Jaalen Edenshaw, as well as Graham Richard, joined Sandercock in 2014 to begin work on the script. Over twelve months, with advice from fluent Haida speakers Diane Brown (the Edenshaws' grandmother) and Harold Yeltatzie, the writing team conducted interviews and held workshops and film screenings in Old Massett and Skidegate, two predominantly Haida communities on the island of Haida Gwaii, British Columbia. Sandercock recalled, in an essay after the film's release, that three major items of importance for the Haida Gwaii residents they interviewed were reviving the Haida language, keeping jobs on the island, and protecting the island's land and waters.

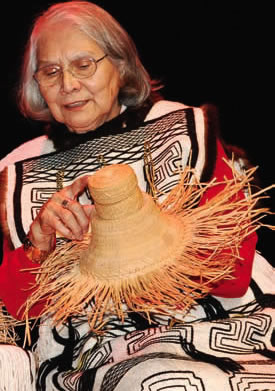
Delores Churchill: A Haida weaver, she helped translate the Edge of the Knife script into the two dialects of Haida.

The writers decided to develop the dramatic story of the Haida wildman (called Gaagiixiid or Gaagiid). This is a traditional Haida narrative that follows someone who survives an accident at sea and whose humanity declines as they struggle to survive. The Gaagiixiid story also works as an allegory for any struggle, mental or physical. The screenplay was completed in April 2015, and Delores Churchill, along with the Skidegate Haida Immersion Program (SHIP), translated the script into the two dialects of Haida. Gwaii Edenshaw said that having the movie be in Haida "did not even feel like a choice ... We were telling a Haida story." The writers tried to give equal screen time to the northern dialect, from Old Massett, and the southern one, from Skidegate, "to encourage members of both communities to learn their own dialect and to have a film that would showcase both," as Sandercock wrote. By conferring with Haida elders, the writers strove to accurately represent Haida culture as it was before contact from colonizers; additionally, Jaalen Edenshaw conducted archival research. The title in Haida is SG̲aawaay Ḵʹuuna, which refers to a Haida proverb: "The world is as sharp as the edge of a knife; as you go along you have to be careful or you will fall off one side or the other." (Note: The film title has sometimes been represented as The Edge of the Knife.)

Jonathan Frantz, of Kingulliit Productions, produced the film through the nascent Niijang Xyaalas Productions and was director of photography. Zacharias Kunuk was the film's executive producer. Edge of the Knife was co-directed by Gwaai Edenshaw (in his directing debut), who is Haida; and Helen Haig-Brown, who is Tsilhqot'in. With Edge of the Knife, filmmakers intended to preserve Haida language and culture for future generations.

The production for Edge of the Knife was done with CA$1,800,000 in funding, including support from Telefilm Canada, the Council of the Haida Nation, the Canada Media Fund, and British Columbia and federal tax credits. The Gwaii Trust put CA$100,000 toward the film. "The film reflects a resurgence of indigenous art and culture taking place across Canada," Catherine Porter wrote for The New York Times in 2017. Some support for the film is meant to promote reconciliation for the residential school system, which strictly prohibited indigenous students, including Haida, from learning their native languages. It was also made at a time when a Haida dictionary was being compiled and Haida pronunciations were being recorded.

Casting took place in June 2016. One actor, Brandon Kallio, was a commercial fisherman whose only Haida was picked up from his children's homework. He recalled seeing a call for auditions on Facebook, and brought his wife, Adeana Young, and their four children to his audition; they all received roles in the movie. Though Young was more hesitant to join the production than her husband, she later said that she ended up enjoying the filmmaking process and hoped to become a fluent Haida speaker.

=== Filming ===
None of the starring actors could hold a conversation in Haida before joining the film. In April 2017, the all-Haida cast gathered for two weeks to learn lines and the pronunciation of Haida words. Workshops included voice coaching and acting lessons. (Note: Some actors, such as dancer Curtis Brown, went to the language training even though they had no lines in the film. "Just to be there to learn it myself personally and take it all in was pretty incredible," Brown said.) Each day after language activities together, actors would break into small groups, sometimes individually, to be instructed by fluent speakers. After a week of language training, the actors had most of their lines memorized. The actor training cost a total of CA$100,000; producer Frantz said he considered dubbing difficult lines in post-production.

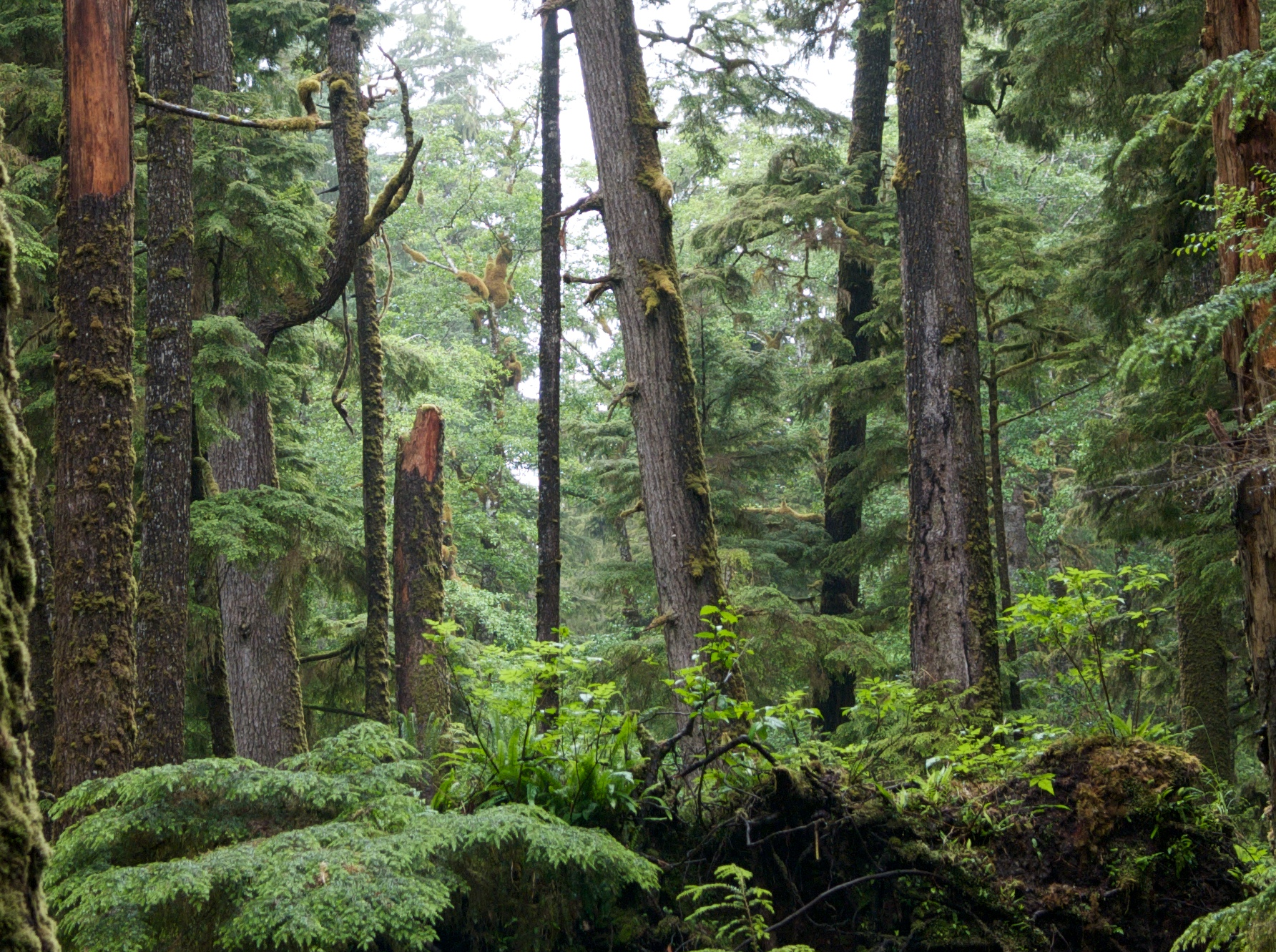
Edge of the Knife was filmed and set on Haida Gwaii.

Filming was planned to begin in June 2017 in Yan, a former Haida village on the Masset Inlet coast. Few crew members were professionals, (Note: Of the few crew members with professional experience, some had worked on White Fang (1991), 300 (2006), the Lord of the Rings series (2001–03), and Deadpool (2016). Executive producer Zacharias Kunuk directed the critically acclaimed film Atanarjuat: The Fast Runner (2001).) and most of the cast had no previous acting experience. A longhouse was constructed for the set, and local Haida people provided costumes and traditional, hand-poked chest tattoos of family crests. Though the clans featured in Edge of the Knife are fictional, the crest tattoos that actors received were based on their respective real-life identities. (Note: Haida tattoo artists Corey Bulpitt and Kwiaahwah Jones spent days on tattoos for some actors. "I always wanted to bring back traditionally hand-poked Haida chest tattoos, but I never had the chance and nobody asked me for one," Bulpitt said. "When I finally got this opportunity it was a fulfillment of a dream. These were the first full Haida chest pieces to be hand poked in a hundred years.") Women produced traditional costumes by weaving red cedar.

In the week of 23 May 2017, the 23 actors and 35 crew members commenced production, and the cast and crew camped out in Yan during the five weeks of filming. (Note: Of the 58 people who worked on the film, 47 were indigenous (including 41 Haida).) The few Haida-fluent actors improvised several lines. Many actors regularly rehearsed in the center camp's dining tent. During the recording process, actors continued improving their pronunciation of Haida words with the assistance of fluent speakers. Elder Haida also provided counsel for the design of cultural elements like costumes and sets. Edenshaw said jokingly, "I'm the boss unless the elders say otherwise." One actor, Erica Ryan-Gagne, said the elders were "the heartbeat, the backbone" of the production, which needed to "harness their knowledge and give them the floor".

The crew brought people, cameras, and equipment to Yan by boat; rain and wind interrupted several shoots. During filming, the crew paid particular attention to avoiding anachronisms like evidence of deer and logging, which had not been introduced to Haida Gwaii in the 1800s. The entire film was shot on the island. Two weeks into filming, Gwaai Edenshaw and Frantz scouted a wooded location near Port Clements to find the tree for the "key sequence" in the film when the Gaagiixiid, played by Tyler York, leaves society and builds a home.

One actress in Edge of the Knife was then 73-year-old Sphenia Jones, who went through the residential school system. She had not spoken Haida since she was a teenager. "It feels so good [to speak Haida]," she said, "mainly because I can say it out loud without being afraid." While on set, Haida musician Vern Williams sang and played a drum to create songs for Edge of the Knife. Filming was scheduled to end on 2 July.

=== Post-production ===
Musician Kinnie Starr composed the film's score. In January 2017, the film was expected to be complete within the year, receiving press as the first feature-length film only in Haida dialects. The film was in editing in November 2017, and it was still in post-production in March 2018. The film has been released with English subtitles.

== Release ==
The film's creators said the primary audience for Edge of the Knife is the population of Haida Gwaii, where the film may be a teaching tool and time capsule for the language. It was first shown on Haida Gwaii on the 1–2 September 2018 weekend. "If the Toronto Sun says they don't like it, I can live with that," Gwaai Edenshaw said, "But if [my aunt] is coming at me, well, then I'll be running scared." (Note: "I have confidence that it will be interesting to a broad audience," Gwaai Edenshaw said, "but the ones that will be coming back at me if we don't do it right will be our aunties. So that's the audience that I really have to make sure that we do good by.")

Edge of the Knife made its public premiere on 7 September at the 2018 Toronto International Film Festival (TIFF). It was noted as one of several indigenous-film premieres at TIFF along with Falls Around Her and The Grizzlies. It was also shown on 3 and 5 October at the Vancouver International Film Festival, and because those two screenings in a 1,800-seat theatre were filled, a third date was added which also sold out. It also closed the imagineNATIVE Film + Media Arts Festival on 21 October.

Edge of the Knife is distributed internationally by Isuma, with a United Kingdom premiere in April 2019 at Curzon Cinemas in Soho, London. Its Australian premiere was the opening film of the Birrarangga Film Festival in Melbourne on 26 April 2019.

Edge of the Knife, Sandercock said, can be used to teach the language to Haida youth as part of a month-long "language module". She said that some members of the cast and crew, motivated by their work on Edge of the Knife, had begun receiving new acting roles and begun training others to make movies under the Haida production company Niijang Xyaalas.

== Reception ==
Edge of the Knife received positive reviews from critics and audiences. According to Patrick Davies of The Williams Lake Tribune in Williams Lake, British Columbia, it "generated a ton of positive buzz" after its festival showings with particular praise for "its storytelling and community-minded approach to filmmaking". Jason Asenap of High Country News praised the film's indigenous themes and noted the distinct absence of an "Anglo protagonist's worldview". Asenap called the movie "a window into the inner workings of a Haida community, its members' ideas of justice, humor, and matters as simple as food and daily entertainment". National Post's Chris Knight wrote: "Its heart and soul transcend language." Teresa Nieman of Screen Anarchy called Edge of the Knife "a triumph of Indigenous creativity" whose "commitment to authenticity is admirable". Adrian Mack of The Georgia Straight wrote that lead actor Tyler York's "commitment to the role is hair-raising". Nieman also wrote that the "quiet, moody, meditative" film became "truly immersive" because of untouched scenery of Haida Gwaii and because the "characters typically speak in a slow, poetic lilt".

The Globe and Mail reviewer Barry Hertz commended the filmmakers for "turning a seemingly simple story of human nature into a captivating and at times stunning work" that contains "themes of guilt and redemption" presented "in a vision so distinct and unfamiliar to audiences that the film feels abundantly fresh". Volkmar Richter of The Vancouver Observer wrote that "the film is gripping, exciting and visually stunning"—it is "high drama and very modern in both pace and look". Nieman also wrote that "the movie is gorgeously shot" except for "a few overly stylized scenes depicting Adiitsʹii's increasingly feral perspective". Neiman also praised the acting, score, and costume design. Radheyan Simonpillai of the Toronto newspaper Now wrote: "The preservation act challenges the cast to wrap their tongues around words they don't know. But their emotional performances overcome in a film stacked with stunning imagery, where the natural and mythical get tangled. Edge of the Knife begins by mourning for a lost future. But in telling this story it finds hope yet."

Edge of the Knife won best British Columbian film and best Canadian film at the VIFF British Columbia Spotlight event on 6 October. At imagineNATIVE, it won the Sun Jury Award. TIFF named the film to its annual year-end Canada's Top Ten list.

=== Accolades ===
==== Film festivals ====
Edge of the Knife has been programmed at several major film festivals:

- Toronto International Film Festival, 6–16 September 2018
- Vancouver International Film Festival, 27 September – 12 October 2018
- imagineNATIVE Film + Media Arts Festival, 17–21 October 2018 – closing gala screening
- Smithsonian Institution's Mother Tongue Film Festival, 21–24 February 2019
- Kingston Canadian Film Festival, 28 February – 3 March 2019

==== Awards ====
Award body	Date	Category	Result	Ref.
CAFTCAD Awards	10 February 2019	Best Costume Design in Low Budget Feature: Athena Theny	Won	
imagineNATIVE Film + Media Arts Festival	21 October 2018	Sun Jury Prize	Won	
Toronto International Film Festival	5 December 2018	Canada's Top Ten	Won	
Vancouver Film Critics Circle	7 January 2019	Best Canadian Film	Won	
Vancouver Film Critics Circle	7 January 2019	Best British Columbia Film	Won	
Vancouver Film Critics Circle	7 January 2019	Best Director of a Canadian Film: Gwaai Edenshaw & Helen Haig-Brown	Won	
Vancouver Film Critics Circle	7 January 2019	Best Actor in a Canadian Film: Tyler York	Won	
Vancouver Film Critics Circle	7 January 2019	Best Supporting Actor in a Canadian Film: William Russ	Nominated	
Vancouver International Film Festival	6 October 2018	Best Canadian Film	Won	
Vancouver International Film Festival	6 October 2018	Best British Columbia Film	Won	
Vancouver International Film Festival	12 October 2018	Most Popular Canadian Feature	Won	

== See also ==
- List of Canadian films of 2018
