= Fuck You (film) =

2018 Swedish film

- Directed by: Anette Sidor
- Written by: Anette Sidor
- Produced by: Jerry Carlsson; Anette Sidor
- Starring: Yandeh Sallah; Martin Schaub
- Cinematography: Marcus Dineen
- Edited by: Magnus Eriksson; Anette Sidor
- Music by: Natali Noor
- Production company: Verket Produktion
- Distributed by: Filmpixs
- Release date: January 28, 2018 (GFF)
- Running time: 15 minutes
- Country: Sweden
- Language: Swedish

Fuck You is a Swedish short comedy film, directed by Anette Sidor and released in 2018. The film stars Yandeh Sallah as Alice, a young woman who turns the tables on her boyfriend Johannes (Martin Schaub) after he treats her in a sexist manner in public, with the help of a stolen dildo.

The cast also includes Astrid Plynning, Tj Miansangi, Jerry Lindh, Omeya Lundqvist-Simbizi, Richard Smidestam, Alex Hormigo and Jack Blossby.

The film premiered in January 2018 at the Gothenburg Film Festival. It was later screened at the 2018 Toronto International Film Festival, where it received an honorable mention for the Best International Short Film award.
