= Prix Giverny Capital =

- Description: Biennial award for contemporary visual artists from Quebec
- Country: Canada (Quebec)
- Presented by: Giverny Capital

The Prix Giverny Capital is a bi-annual award for contemporary artists from Quebec, Canada.

== About the Prize ==
The Giverny Capital Prize, established in 2007 by the portfolio management firm Giverny Capital, is awarded every two years to a visual artist from Quebec, who has been practicing for at least ten years. The prize comes with a grant of $10,000.

== Winners of the Prize ==
- 2007 - Diane Landry
- 2009 - Mathieu Beausejour
- 2011 - ATSA - [ATSA - Action terroriste socialement acceptable]
- 2013 - Jean-Pierre Aube
- 2015 - Nelson Henricks
- 2017 - Sophie Jodoin
- 2019 - Richard Ibghy and Marilou Lemmens
- 2020 - Hannah Klaus
- 2021 - Karen Tam
- 2023 — Malena Szlam
- 2025 — Anthony Burnham
