= Consequences (2018 film) =

- Cinema release poster
- Slovene: Posledice
- Directed by: Darko Štante
- Written by: Darko Štante
- Produced by: Andraz Jeric
- Starring: Matej Zemljič; Timon Šturbej
- Cinematography: Rok Kajzer Nagode
- Edited by: Sara Gjergek
- Production company: Temporama
- Distributed by: Demiurg
- Release dates: 7 September 2018 (TIFF); 10 October 2018 (Slovenia)
- Running time: 95 minutes
- Countries: Slovenia; Austria
- Language: Slovene

Consequences (Slovene: Posledice) is a 2018 Slovenian drama film directed by Darko Štante. Billed as the first film related to same-sex attraction ever made in Slovenia, the film stars Matej Zemljič as Andrej, a troubled teenager who is sentenced to a stint in a youth detention centre following a series of petty crimes, and finds himself sexually and romantically attracted to Željko (Timon Šturbej), the tough and charismatic self-appointed group leader of the other males in the centr.

The film had its cinematic premiere in the 'Discovery' programme at the 2018 Toronto International Film Festival, before having its first screening in Slovenia at the Festival of Slovenian Film. It won several awards at the Festival of Slovenian Film, including Best Director, Best Actor (Zemljič), Best Supporting Actor (Šturbej), the Audience Award and the Slovenian Film Critics' Jury Award.

The film was released in cinemas in Slovenia in October 2018, and had limited international distribution in 2019.
