= Look at Me (2015 film) =

2015 film story of Lotfi

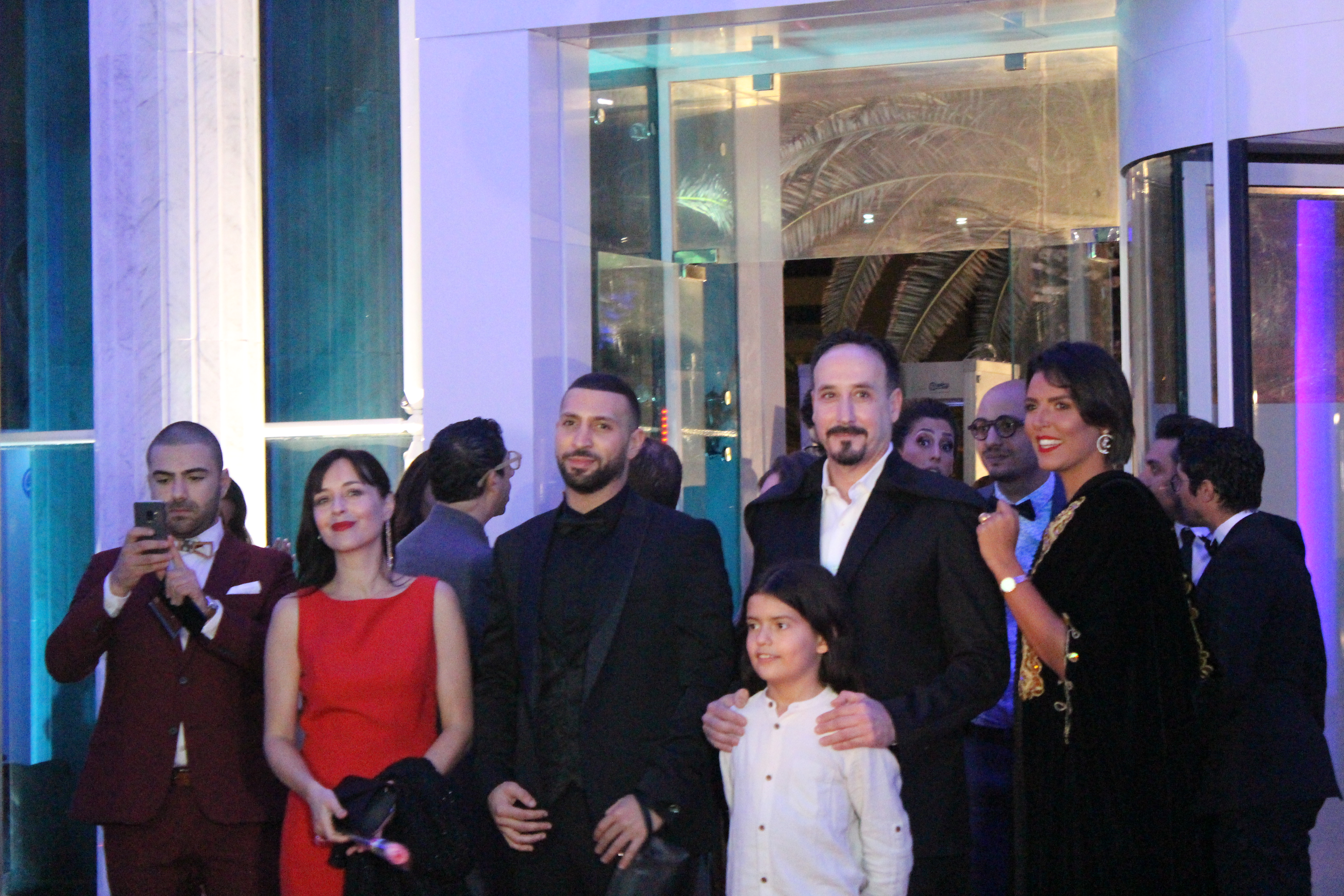
- Opening ceremony JCC 2018
- Directed by: Nejib Belkadhi
- Written by: Nejib Belkadhi, Maud Ameline
- Starring: Nidhal Saadi, Idryss Kharroubi, Saoussen Maalej, Aziz Jebali
- Release dates: June 16, 2015 (France); September 26, 2018 (Algeria)

Look at Me is a 2015 drama film that tells the story of Lotfi, a Tunisian immigrant who lives in Marseille with his French wife and son. Lotfi works as a security guard and tries to forget his past in Tunisia, where he left his family and his other son, who has autism. However, his life changes when he receives a phone call from his mother, who informs him that his wife has suffered a stroke and is in a coma. Lotfi decides to return to Tunisia with his son, hoping to reconnect with his roots and his other autistic son. But he soon realizes that his homeland is not the same as he remembered, and that he has to face his own demons and secrets. The film is a poignant exploration of identity, family, and belonging, as well as a portrait of contemporary Tunisia. The film was directed by Néjib Belkadhi, a Tunisian filmmaker who also co-wrote the script with Maud Ameline. The film stars Nidhal Saadi, Idryss Kharroubi, Saoussen Maalej, and Aziz Jebali. The film was praised for its performances, cinematography, and music. The film was released in France on June 16, 2015, and in Algeria on September 26, 2018. The film won several awards, including the Best Actor award for Nidhal Saadi at the Carthage Film Festival.
