= Fig Tree (film) =

2018 film

- Directed by: Alamork Davidian
- Written by: Alamork Davidian
- Release date: 27 August 2018
- Countries: Ethiopia; France; Germany; Israel
- Language: Amharic

Fig Tree is a 2018 internationally co-produced drama film directed by Alamork Davidian. In July 2018, it was one of five films nominated for the Ophir Award for Best Picture. The film was screened at the 2018 Toronto International Film Festival, where Davidian won the Eurimages Audentia Award for Best Female Director.
