= Diane Landry =

Canadian kinetic artist

- Born: 1958 (age 67–68); Cap-de-la-Madeleine
- Known for: installation and performance artist

Diane Landry (born 1958) is a Canadian contemporary artist. Landry is known for her kinetic sculptural works and performances that use light, shadow, and sound to explore themes of time and movement.

== Work ==
In Landry's work École d'aviation, numerous motorized umbrellas with built-in accordions are installed so as to give the impression they are about to take off as they move. The installation was made from umbrellas, harmonicas, motors, steel, cardboard, lights, and computers.

== Awards ==
In 2007, she was awarded the inaugural Prix Giverny Capital for her contributions to Quebecois culture. In 2014 Landry received the Jean Paul Riopelle Career Grant from the Conseil des arts et des lettres du Québec. In 2015, Landry was a recipient of a Guggenheim fellowship in fine arts.

== Exhibitions and performances ==
=== Individual exhibitions and performances ===
==== 1998 ====
- La Morue: November 4, 1998, centre des arts actuels SKOL, Montréal, Québec, Canada

==== 1993 ====
- Stratégie parallèle: VU, Centre d'Animation et de Diffusion de la Photographie, Québec City, Québec, Canada
- ABBOX with Jocelyn Robert: Obscure, Québec, Canada
- Environ 8,000 kilometrès with Jocelyn Robert: Skol, Montréal, Québec, Canada; Memorial University Art Gallery, St. John's, Newfoundland, Canada; Pitt Gallery, Vancouver, British Columbia, Canada; Open Space, Victoria, British Columbia, Canada, Galerie Sans Nom, Moncton, New Brunswick, Canada; Language Plus, Alma, Québec, Canada

==== 1991 ====
- Environ 8,000 kilometrès with Jocelyn Robert: Musée Régional de la Côte-Nord, Sept-Iles, Québec, Canada; Obscure, Québec, Canada
- Risque d'averse: La Centrale, Montréal, Québec, Canada

==== 1990 ====
- Risque d'averse: La chambre blanche, Québec, Canada; Musée du Bas-Saint-Laurent, Rivière-du-Loup, Québec, Canada
- It's gonna rain: Niagara Artists' Centre, St. Catharines, Ontario, Canada

==== 1989 ====
- It's gonna rain: X-Changes Gallery, Victoria, British Columbia, Canada
- 2nd Story Gallery, Calgary, Alberta, Canada

=== Group exhibitions ===
==== 2018 ====
- 2018: Collumina - International Light Art Project Cologne with Elisabeth Brockmann, Rafram Chaddad, Cuppetelli and Mendoza, Hartung | Trenz, Sonia Kallel, Ken Matzubara, molitor & kuzmin, Anna Rosa Rupp, Christine Sciulli, Tilen Sepic, Kurt Laurenz Theinert und Lukas Pearse. Among the selected sites are Museum für Angewandte Kunst (Cologne) and Imhoff-Schokoladenmuseum. Artistic director is Bettina Pelz.

==== 1992 ====
- Computers & Human Interaction Conference '92 with Jocelyn Robert: Monterey, California, USA
- Événement "Poisson d'avril": L'OEil de Poission, Québec, Canada

==== 1991 ====
- Biennale Découverte: Musée du Québec, Québec, Canada
