= Alamork Davidian =

Ethiopian-Israeli film director

Aäläm-Wärqe Davidian
- አላሞርክ ዴቪድያን
- Occupation: Film director
- Spouse: Kobi Davidian

Aäläm-Wärqe Davidian, commonly credited as Alamork Davidian (Amharic: አላሞርክ ዴቪድያን, Hebrew: אלמורק דוידיאן) in English, is an Ethiopian-Israeli film director. Her directorial debut, Fig Tree, was an Ophir Award nominee for Best Picture in 2018.

== Early life ==
She was born in Addis Ababa, Ethiopia, and later emigrated to Israel. Her personal experiences during her childhood in Addis Ababa have influenced her filmmaking, notably in her directorial debut, Fig Tree.

== Career ==
Alamork Davidian's directorial debut, Fig Tree, was released in 2018. The film is a drama set during the Ethiopian Civil War, focusing on a 14-year-old Jewish girl named Mina who navigates the challenges of adolescence amidst the turmoil. Fig Tree was nominated for Best Picture at the Ophir Awards in 2018.

In addition to its Ophir Award nomination, Fig Tree received international recognition. At the 2018 Toronto International Film Festival, Davidian won the Eurimages Audentia Award for Best Female Director.

Following Fig Tree, Davidian directed Facing the Wall in 2016 and Honey Trap in 2022.
