= The Grand Bizarre =

- Directed by: Jodie Mack
- Cinematography: Jodie Mack
- Edited by: Jodie Mack
- Music by: Jodie Mack
- Release date: August 3, 2018 (Locarno)
- Running time: 61 minutes
- Country: United States
- Language: English

The Grand Bizarre is a 2018 American film by experimental animator Jodie Mack. The film is an examination of the global textile industry.

== Production ==
Production for The Grand Bizarre began in 2013 as Mack was touring internationally with a program titled Let Your Light Shine. She had previously made multiple films showing patterned textiles, and during a stop in Oaxaca, Mexico, she shot footage of fabrics owned by a man from a weaving village. After Mexico, she proceeded to film in China and Poland. She stopped touring her earlier films so that she could travel for production of The Grand Bizarre. Observing the omnipresence of international brands, she began focusing on the influence of commerce on art, the impact of tourism on regional economies, and the ethics of ethnography. Over course of five years, Mack collected footage in fifteen countries, including Turkey, Greece, Israel, Morocco, and Indonesia.

Mack shot The Grand Bizarre on 16 mm film using a Bolex camera. As a result, the maximum length she was able to use for a shot was 30 seconds.

== Post-production ==
Mack edited the film from a total of six hours of footage. She decided to make it an hour long because that was the most that she could fit on a 16 mm reel. She also thought it was fitting to match the film's duration to a unit of time. She received support through a fellowship with the Radcliffe Institute for Advanced Study at Harvard University. This allowed her to spend more time on the project during the final year of making The Grand Bizarre.

The Grand Bizarre uses twelve songs, ten of which are by Mack. In recording the music, Mack focused on exploring tropes in pop and electronic music, such as Auto-Tune and repeated phrases in 4/4 time. She was interested in looking at the connection between mass production and homogeneous music. An earlier cut of the film used more vocal performance, which she removed to simplify the experience. To avoid having the songs overpower the visuals, Mack often played the songs where she was shooting and re-recorded them. This introduced diegetic sounds from the locations into the film.

== Release ==
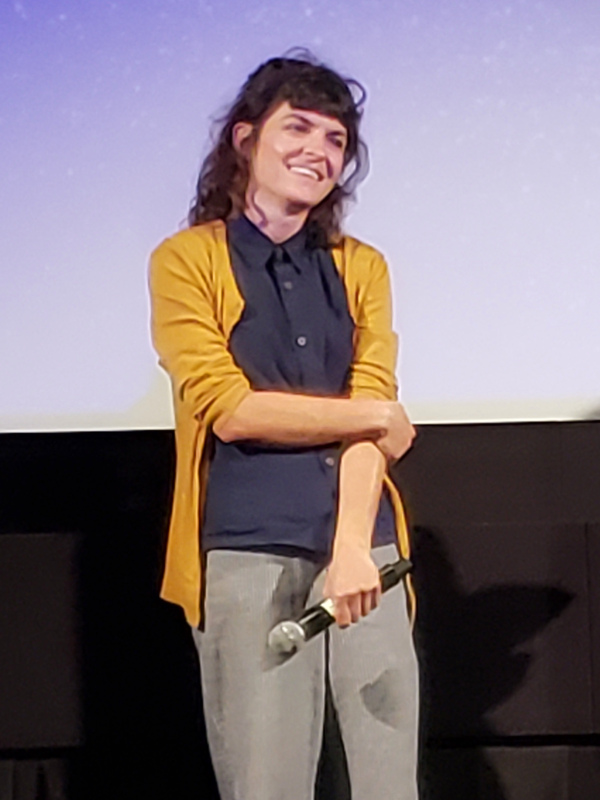
Filmmaker Jodie Mack presenting The Grand Bizarre at the 2018 Toronto International Film Festival

The film premiered August 3, 2018 at the Locarno Festival.

== Reception ==
The Grand Bizarre received positive reviews from film critics. The Grand Bizarre has an approval rating of 100% on review aggregator website Rotten Tomatoes, based on 12 reviews, and an average rating of 8.1/10. Metacritic assigned the film a weighted average score of 81 out of 100, based on 5 critics, indicating "universal acclaim". In a review for Film Threat, Nick Rocco Scalia called it an "extremely eye-opening" film that forces the audience "to consider how complicated and incredible every single stitch of a rug, or a scarf, or a dishtowel actually is, and how easily it is to overlook that fact." For NOW Toronto, Kevin Ritchie said that "the film bursts with energy and invention to the point of sensory overload."

Film Comment magazine ranked The Grand Bizarre eighth on its "Best Undistributed Films of 2018" list.
