= Bastardo (film) =

2013 film

- Directed by: Nejib Belkadhi
- Written by: Nejib Belkadhi
- Produced by: Imed Marzouk
- Starring: Abdel Moneem Chouayat
- Cinematography: Gergely Pohárnok
- Edited by: Pascale Chavance, Badi Chouka
- Music by: Lone Wolf (Paul Marshall)
- Distributed by: Propaganda Production
- Release date: 8 September 2013 (TIFF)
- Running time: 106 minutes
- Country: Tunisia
- Language: Arabic

Bastardo is a 2013 Tunisian drama film written and directed by Nejib Belkadhi. It was screened in the Contemporary World Cinema section at the 2013 Toronto International Film Festival.

== Plot ==
Mohsen, "the bastard", was found in a dustbin 30 years ago by his adoptive father, and has always been rejected by the residents of the rundown district where he lives. When he is fired from his job, a mobile phone company comes to install a relay tower on the roof of his modest house in exchange for a monthly stipend, Bastardo has a reversal of fortune. The aerial makes Mohsen a wealthy and respected man, to the disgruntlement of the village mobster Larnouba.

Director Belkadhi says:

"Power and corruption have been part of our lives for decades, and less than three years after the revolution, I am still wondering if we made it. Back in 2007, when I began writing the script, I had one thought in mind: my main character Bastardo shouldn’t choose power. It’s rather power that chooses him and radically changes him."

== Cast ==
- Abdel Moneem Chouayat as Mohsen Bastardo
- Chedly Arfaoui as Larnouba
- Lobna Noomene as Bent Essengra
- Taoufik El Bahri as Khlifa
- Lassad Ben Abdallah as Khadra
- Issa Harath as Am Salah
- Latifa El Gafsi
- Ramzy Slim
- Bilel Briki

== Production ==
Bastardo received a grant from the Doha Film Institute in 2011. The original, uncut version of the movie was 3 hours and 20 minutes' long.
