= The Dive (2018 film) =

2018 film

- Film poster
- Directed by: Yona Rozenkier
- Written by: Yona Rozenkier
- Produced by: Kobi Mizrahi, Efrat Cohen, Ben Karniel, Dominique Welinski
- Starring: Yoel Rozenkier, Micha Rozenkier, Yona Rozenkier, Claudia Dulitchi, Miki Marmour, Daniel Sabag
- Release date: 1 August 2018 (Jerusalem FF)
- Running time: 90 minutes
- Country: Israel
- Language: Hebrew

The Dive (Hebrew: Hatzlila) is a 2018 Israeli drama film directed by Yona Rozenkier. The film premiered at the 2018 Jerusalem Film Festival. It was later screened in the Contemporary World Cinema section at the 2018 Toronto International Film Festival.

== Plot ==
Set during the Second Lebanon War, the film follows Yoav (Yoel Rozenkier), who returns to his childhood kibbutz near the Israel-Lebanon border after a year of estrangement from his family. He comes to attend a memorial for his father, whose body had been donated to science a year earlier. Yoav's younger brother, Avishai (Micha Rozenkier), is a soldier about to be deployed to the northern front, but he exhibits signs of anxiety. Meanwhile, their eldest brother, Itai (Yonatan Rozenkier), takes it upon himself to toughen up Avishai, much to Yoav's disapproval. A former IDF officer, Yoav grapples with his own struggles with post-traumatic stress as the family navigates tensions heightened by the looming war.

== Cast ==
Сast	Character
Yoel Rozenkier	Yoav
Micha Rozenkier	Avishai
Yona Rozenkier	Itay
Claudia Dulitchi	Frenca
Miki Marmur	Chava
Shmuel Adleman	Uzi
Daniel Sabag	Dalal
Elad Tsafany	Ehud
