= Athena Theny =

Athena Theny is a Canadian costume and accessory designer based in Vancouver, British Columbia, She first became known in the 2010s as a designer of leather jewellery, purses and clothing, made using ethically sourced leather and traditional environmentally-friendly tanning practices.

As a costume designer in film, she won a CAFTCAD award for best costume design in a low-budget feature in 2019 for her work on Edge of the Knife, and received a Canadian Screen Award nomination for Best Costume Design at the 12th Canadian Screen Awards in 2024 for Seagrass.
