= Yona Rozenkier =

Israeli actor, writer and filmmaker

- יונה רוזנקיאר
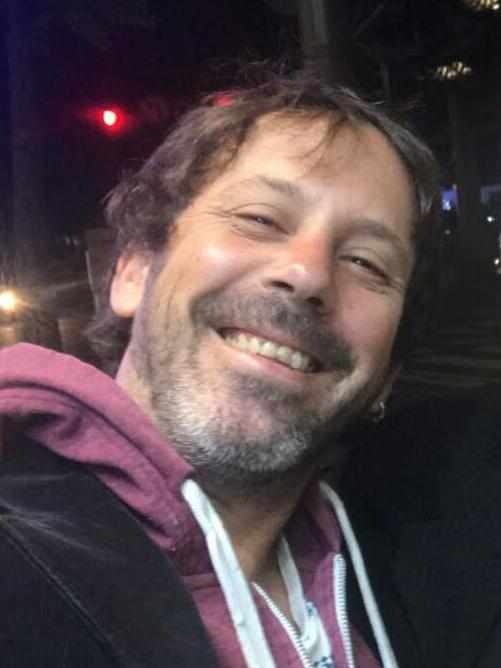
- Yona Rozenkier, 2019
- Born: Yona Rozenkier; 10 April 1981 (age 45); Yehiam, Israel
- Occupation: Film director
- Years active: 2010–present

Yona Rozenkier (Hebrew: יונה רוזנקיאר; born 1982) is an Israeli actor, writer and filmmaker.

== Early life ==
Rozenkier was born in Kibbutz Yehiam. The second of four brothers born to Abrham Rozenfkier, the Kibbutz general secretary and Mapam's international general secretary, and Franzi Rozenkier, a kibbutz volunteer originally from Switzerland.

== Career ==
After serving as a medic at the paratroopers brigade at the IDF, Rozenkier began his film studies at Tel Aviv University film school in 2007.

=== Short films ===
He has directed several short films including "Khaya im Kasda" (Bugs on a helmet) (2011), Parparim (Butterflies) (2019) and "Raz and Radja" (2012) a short film made for the "Water" project, a program by Tel Aviv University, showcasing short films made by both Israeli and Palestinian directors aiming at a better comprehension between the two communities.

=== Feature Movies ===
In 2018 Rozenkier debuted his first full-length feature "The Dive" at the 2018 Jerusalem Film Festival. The film is the first feature of Tel Aviv's Gaudeamus Productions. The film, which also won the inaugural $100,000 grant from The Steve Tisch Foundation for First Features. The film was nominated in four Israeli Film Academy award categories including best screenplay and best supporting actor for Yona himself.

The film won best Israeli debut, best Israeli feature film and best cinematography (Oded Ashkenazi) in the 2018 Jerusalem film festival. The main three actors Micha Rozenkier, Yona Rozenkier and Yoel Rozenkier won best actors at the festival "For a powerful performance by an ensemble of actors who work together with remarkable chemistry."

Also in 2018 the film won the "Filmmakers of the Present Competition" at the Locarno International Film Festival.

In 2019 the film was nominated for best film in Cinema Jove - Valencia International Film Festival.

Rozenkier's second feature film "35 Downhill" (Haderech Le'Eilat) was released in 2022. The film tells the story of a father and son traveling from the north of Israel to the southern city of Eilat, won the Haggiag Award for best Israeli Feature at the 2022 Jerusalem Film Festival. The Film is also nominated for 11 Ophir awards including best Film and screenplay, among them best actor (Yoel Rozenkier), Best supporting actor (Samuel Vilozny) Photography (Oded Ashkanazi) and Best film editor (Or Lee Tal). Later that year, he played Yinon in the film The Other Widow directed by Maayan Rypp.

=== TV ===
In 2020 the TV show "Hakibutznikim" ("The Commune") which Rozenkier has co written and produced and was first aired at Hot, Israeli cable network.
