= Drew Lint =

Canadian film director and screenwriter (born 1987)

Drew Lint (born 1987) is a Canadian film director and screenwriter, whose debut feature film M/M debuted at the 2018 Slamdance Film Festival.

Originally from Dunnville, Ontario, he studied film production at Ryerson University. He directed a number of short films, including Parallel Lines (2008), Collected Memories (2008), Harvest (2009) and Mirrors (2012), before moving to Berlin, Germany in 2013. His 2014 short film Rough Trade was his international breakthrough, premiering at Slamdance in 2014.

Lint was longlisted for the Directors Guild of Canada's Discovery Award in 2018, and was shortlisted for the Vancouver Film Critics Circle's One to Watch Award at the Vancouver Film Critics Circle Awards 2018.
