= Gwaai Edenshaw =

Haida artist and filmmaker from Canada

- Born: 1977 (age 48–49); Skidegate, Haida Gwaii, British Columbia
- Occupations: Artist, filmmaker, writer
- Relatives: Guujaaw (father)
- Writing career
- Pen name: Hluugitgaa (Haida)
- Notable work: Edge of the Knife (SG̲aawaay Ḵʹuuna)
- Website: gwaai.com

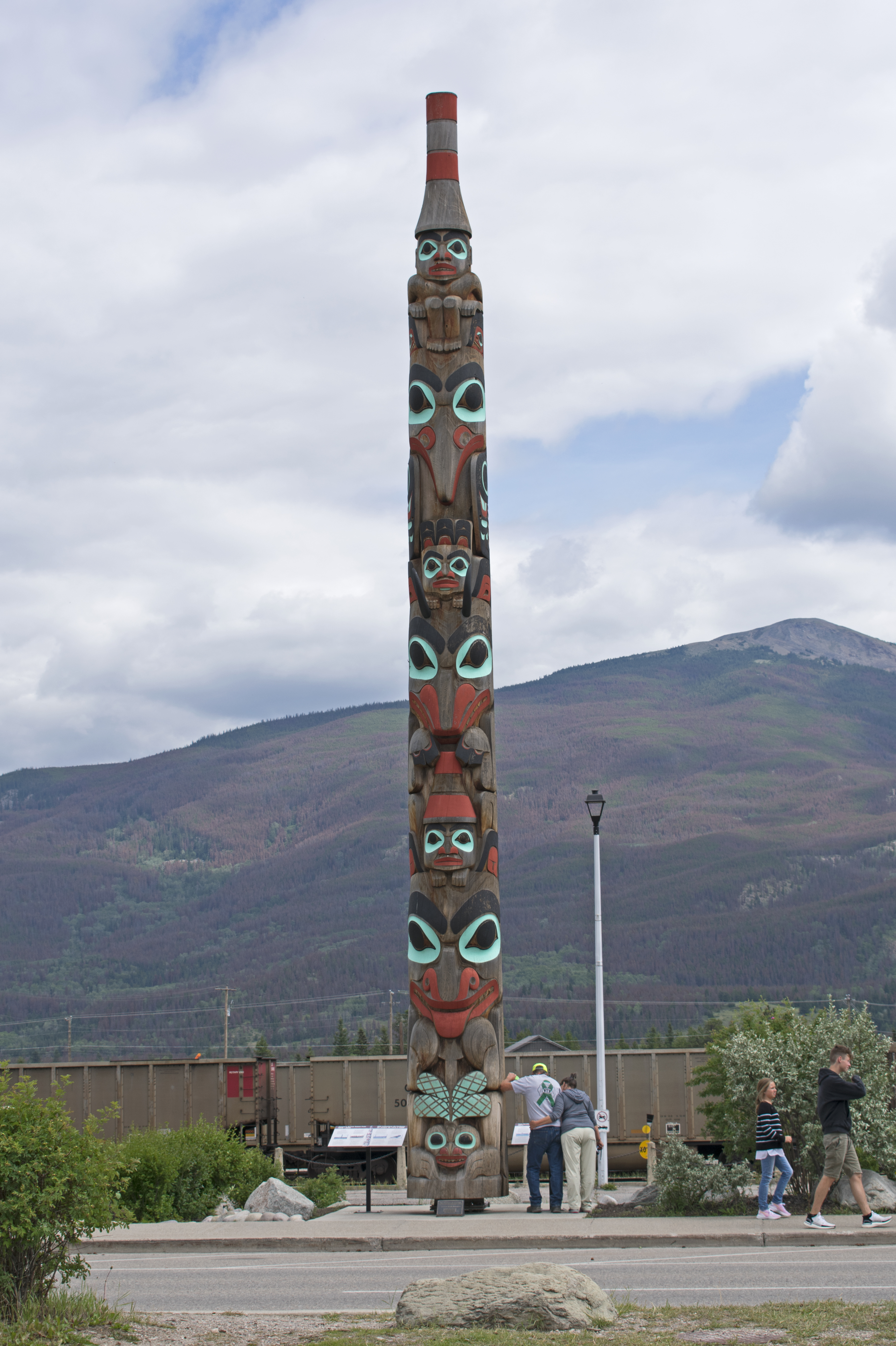
Two Brothers, a totem pole carved by Jaalen and Gwaai Edenshaw, Jasper, Alberta (2011).

Gwaai Edenshaw is a Haida artist and filmmaker from Canada. Along with Helen Haig-Brown, he co-directed Edge of the Knife (SG̲aawaay Ḵʹuuna), the first Haida language feature film.

== Background ==
The son of noted Haida artist Guujaaw (Gary Edenshaw), he was raised on Haida Gwaii. At age 16, he went to Vancouver to apprentice as an artist with Bill Reid. He received a diploma in jewellery design from Vancouver Community College. As of 2018, he lived in Sechelt, BC with his partner, musician Kinnie Starr.

== Career ==
As an artist, Edenshaw has worked primarily in woodcarving and jewellery, as well as some work in sketch and painting. His work has been exhibited in a number of galleries in both Canada and the United States, and he curated a show on indigenous erotica in 2013.

He created Haidawood, an animated web series which premiered in 2007, and cowrote the theatrical play Sounding Gambling Sticks with his brother Jaalen Edenshaw in 2008. He wrote some Haida-inspired music for Bruce Ruddell's 2010 rock opera Beyond Eden. He is a founding member of Q’altsi’da Kaa, a group which promotes traditional Haida storytelling.

In 2017 Edenshaw and Haig-Brown began production on Edge of the Knife. Based on the traditional Haida story of Gaagiixid the "wild man", who loses his grip on reality in the forest before being returned to his community in a healing ceremony, the film had its theatrical premiere at the 2018 Toronto International Film Festival.

The film won the awards for Best Canadian Film and Best British Columbia Film at the 2018 Vancouver International Film Festival, and the Sun Jury Award at the imagineNATIVE Film + Media Arts Festival. It won several year-end awards from the Vancouver Film Critics Circle, for Best Canadian Film and Best British Columbia Film, Best Director and Best Actor (Tyler York). It was named to TIFF's annual year-end Canada's Top Ten list for 2018.
