= Fausto (2018 film) =

2018 Canadian docufiction film

- Film poster
- Directed by: Andrea Bussmann
- Written by: Andrea Bussmann
- Produced by: Andrea Bussmann; Nicolás Pereda
- Starring: Victor Pueyo; Fernando Renjifo; Ziad Chakaroun; Alberto Núñez; Gabino Rodríguez
- Cinematography: Andrea Bussmann
- Edited by: Andrea Bussmann
- Release date: August 9, 2018 (Locarno)
- Running time: 70 minutes
- Country: Canada
- Languages: Spanish; Arabic; English; French

Fausto is a Canadian docufiction film, directed by Andrea Bussmann and released in 2018. Set in Oaxaca, Mexico, the film blurs the lines between reality and fantasy by exploring the community's mythologies and folklore.

The film was shot on video, and then transferred to 16mm film.

The film premiered at the 2018 Locarno Film Festival, where it received an honourable mention from the Filmmakers of the Present competition jury. It had its Canadian premiere in the Wavelengths program at the 2018 Toronto International Film Festival.

== Critical response ==
Peter Goldberg of Slant gave the film a three-star rating, writing that "Fausto abounds with piecemeal stories from locals and fantastic characters that evoke the writings of Borges and Bruno Schulz. These fragments of narration resist the devilish drive to see everything, to encompass everything with understanding. The partial and the limited are championed over the continuous and completed—a short circuit in the desire to continue the story to infinity. For Now, Kevin Ritchie rated the film three N's, writing that "Bussmann’s camera frequently lingers on swaths of black night and shadow as if more interested in negative space than conventional action. The storytellers aren’t always as captivating as the filmmaker’s eye, but this version of Faust is also at the nexus of a lot self-relfection and questioning happening more broadly in cinema right now."

== Awards ==
The film won the Directors Guild of Canada's DGC Discovery Award in 2018. It was shortlisted for the Vancouver Film Critics Circle's award for Best Canadian Film, and Bussmann was shortlisted for Best Director of a Canadian Film, at the Vancouver Film Critics Circle Awards 2018.
