= Jodie Mack =

Experimental filmmaker and animator

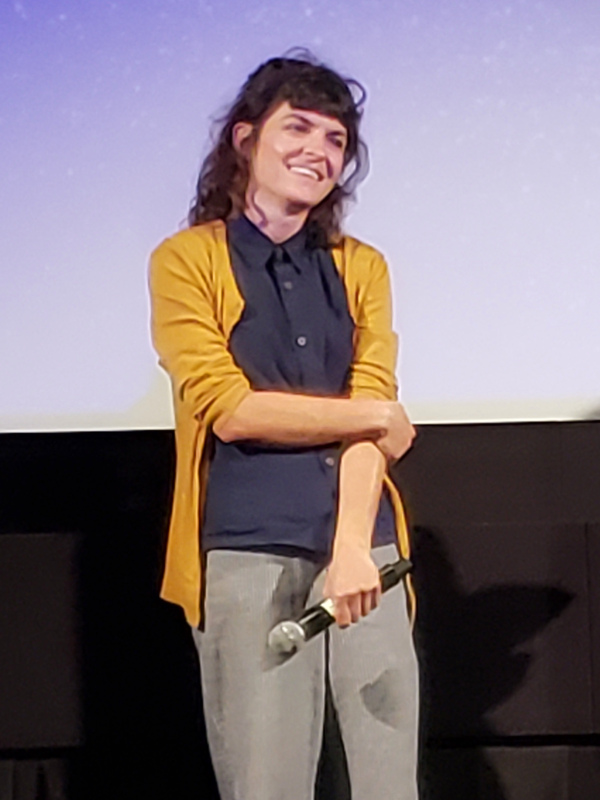
- Mack, September 2018
- Born: 16 January 1983; London, England
- Education: University of Florida; School of the Art Institute of Chicago
- Occupations: Filmmaker, animator
- Website: www.jodiemack.com

Jodie Mack (born January 16, 1983) is an English-born American experimental filmmaker and animator. Mack's works have screened at the Viennale, the New York Film Festival, the Toronto International Film Festival, and the Locarno Festival.

== Early life and education ==
Mack spent her early years in England. She moved to the USA and earned her BA in Film and Media Studies From the University of Florida, graduating Summa cum laude in 2004. She went on to earn her MFA from the School of the Art Institute of Chicago in Film/Video/New Media in 2007.

== Career ==
Mack began work at the television department at Columbia College Chicago. From 2008 to 2010 she was an adjunct professor at the College of Digital Media at DePaul University in Chicago. In 2009, Mack also became and adjunct professor of moving image at the University of Illinois at Chicago. Since 2010 she has been an associate professor of film and media studies at Dartmouth College. She has also worked as a curator and administrator with Dartmouth's EYEWASH: Experimental Films and Videos, Florida Experimental Film and Video Festival, Portland Documentary and Experimental Film Festival, Eye and Ear Clinic, Chicago Underground Film Festival and The Nightingale. She was a 2017–2018 Radcliffe-Harvard Film Study Center Fellow/David and Roberta Logie Fellow.

Mack primarily produces her films using a 16 millimeter Bolex camera. Mack stated in an interview that "[She] chose to work in film because the material renders color and texture in a way that resonates with a lot of [her] work”. Many of Jodie Mack's films are stop motion animations that feature everyday fabrics and textiles or recycled materials like magazine clippings or newspaper scraps.

=== Festivals and presentations ===
Macks' films have appeared at the following festivals: Images Festival, Ann Arbor Film Festival, International Film Festival Rotterdam, Edinburgh International Film Festival, Views From the Avant Garde at the New York Film Festival. Her work has also appeared at: Anthology Film Archives, Los Angeles Filmforum, and the Northwest Film Forum.

=== Work ===
- Yard work is hard work (2008)
- Dusty stacks of Mom (2013) is a documentary/musical performance on her mother's failing rock and roll merchandise business. The film was performed at Rotterdam, RIDM and True/False.
- New fancy foils
- Undertone overture
- The Grand Bizarre (2020)
- Wasteland No. 3: Moons, sons (2021)
- Ultraviolet (2024) at Light Matter Film Festival, Alfred, New York.
