= The Crossing (2018 film) =

- Theatrical release poster
- Chinese: 过春天
- Directed by: Bai Xue
- Written by: Bai Xue
- Produced by: Cary Cheng
- Starring: Yao Huang; Sunny Sun; Ka-Man Tong
- Cinematography: Songri Piao
- Edited by: Matthieu Laclau
- Music by: Xiaoyang Gao
- Production company: Wanda Media
- Release date: September 7, 2018 (TIFF)
- Running time: 99 minutes
- Country: China
- Language: Cantonese

The Crossing (Chinese: 过春天, Guo chun tian; lit. "Passing the Spring") is a Chinese drama film, written and directed by Bai Xue and released in 2018. The film stars Yao Huang as Peipei, a shy teenager in Shenzhen attending school in Hong Kong, who gets drawn into smuggling black market smartphones in the hopes of saving money to fund her dream of travelling to Japan.

The film premiered in September 2018 at the 2018 Toronto International Film Festival, and had its Chinese premiere in October at the Pingyao International Film Festival. It was released mainstream in 2019.

== Awards ==
At TIFF, the film received an honorable mention for the NETPAC Prize. At Pingyao, it won the award for Best Film, and the protagonist, Yao Huang won the award for Best Actress.

At the 13th Asian Film Awards in 2019, Bai Xue was nominated for Best New Director and Yao Huang for Best Newcomer actor.
