= Bai Xue (director) =

Chinese film director, known for The Crossing

- 白雪
- Education: Beijing Film Academy
- Occupations: Film director screenwriter

Bai Xue (Chinese: 白雪) is a Chinese director, known for her feature film debut The Crossing.

== Early life ==
Bai graduated from the Department of Directing at the Beijing Film Academy in 2007. In 2013, she was admitted to the MFA program in the Directing Department at the Beijing Film Academy.

== Career ==
Bai made her feature film debut with The Crossing which she wrote and directed. The film won the Best Film and Best Actress awards at the Pingyao International Film Festival. It had its world premiere at the Toronto International Film Festival, where it was featured in the Discovery section. Additionally, the film was selected for the Generation 14plus section at the Berlin International Film Festival.

== Filmography ==
- The Crossing (2019)
- It's My Time (2026)

== Awards and nominations ==
Year	Award	Category	Work	Result	Ref.
2019	Asian Film Awards	Best New Director	The Crossing	Nominated	
2019	Osaka Asian Film Festival	Most Promising Talent	The Crossing	Won	
2020	China Film Director's Guild Awards	Best Young Director	The Crossing	Nominated	
