= Claire Edmondson =

Canadian filmmaker

Claire Edmondson is a Canadian filmmaker.

== Biography ==
Edmondson was born in Liverpool, England, and grew up in Prince Rupert, British Columbia.

Edmondson's music videos have attracted attention for their lush visuals and dark, provocative themes. Her work sometimes incorporates macabre elements, which she attributes to the dark realities of life growing up in a small town.

In 2011, Edmondson directed the music video "Beat and the Pulse" for Austra and "Sweetest Kill", for Broken Social Scene. In 2012, Edmondson collaborated with Austra again, making a film protesting Russia's imprisonment of the band Pussy Riot. In 2013, she directed "City of Quartz" for Gold and Youth.

=== Commercial work ===
In January 2015, Edmondson wrote and directed Everlast's's 'I'm a Boxer' video. A year later, she was shortlisted for a Young Director Award in the category, Broadcast, Northern America on Leo Burnett's "Own It" campaign for Special K.
