= Altiplano (2018 film) =

- Directed by: Malena Szlam
- Written by: Malena Szlam
- Produced by: Oona Mosna; Malena Szlam
- Cinematography: Malena Szlam
- Edited by: Malena Szlam
- Release date: September 7, 2018 (TIFF)
- Running time: 14 minutes
- Countries: Canada; Chile

Altiplano is a Canadian-Chilean experimental short documentary film, directed by Malena Szlam and released in 2018. Shot in the Altiplano region of Chile, the film depicts the region's unique landscape using various filmmaking techniques to portray it as alien and surreal.

The film premiered at the 2018 Toronto International Film Festival. It was subsequently named to TIFF's year-end Canada's Top Ten list for short films in 2018.

The film was co-produced by Oona Mosna.
