= Tyler York =

Canadian Haida woodcarver and actor

- Occupations: Actor; woodcarver

Tyler York (StllnG̲a) is a Haida woodcarver and actor from Haida Gwaii, British Columbia, Canada. He is most noted for his performance as Adiits'ii in the Haida-language film Edge of the Knife (SG̲aawaay Ḵʹuuna), for which he won the Vancouver Film Critics Circle award for Best Actor in a Canadian Film at the Vancouver Film Critics Circle Awards 2018.

As a carver, York was an apprentice under Jaalen Edenshaw, working together on a totem pole for the Gwaii Haanas National Park Reserve and Haida Heritage Site — first new totem pole to be erected in the park in over a century.

York also plays basketball, where he is a "crowd favorite and fierce competitor".

For the film Edge of the Knife, he and the rest of the cast learned the Haida language in a 2-week training camp and throughout the 5 weeks of filming.
