= M/M =

- Theatrical release poster
- Directed by: Drew Lint
- Written by: Drew Lint
- Produced by: Karen Harnisch; Drew Lint
- Starring: Antoine Lahaie; Nicolas Maxim Endlicher
- Cinematography: Ann Tipper
- Edited by: Drew Lint; Andi Pek
- Production company: Film Forge Productions
- Distributed by: TLA Releasing
- Release date: January 21, 2018 (Slamdance)
- Running time: 81 minutes
- Countries: Canada; Germany
- Languages: English; French; German

M/M is a 2018 Canadian-German independent film directed by Drew Lint. The film follows Matthew, a Canadian expatriate living in Berlin, who becomes obsessed with a Berliner named Matthias.

The film premiered on January 21, 2018, at the Slamdance Film Festival, and had its Canadian premiere on May 30, 2018, at the Inside Out Film and Video Festival. It was picked up by TLA Releasing for distribution in the U.S., the U.K. and France.

== Plot ==
Matthew is a young Canadian new to Berlin. He's come to make a fresh start, but feels the isolation of living in a strange new city. He is entranced when he meets Matthias. Beautiful and charismatic, Matthias is everything Matthew wants to be. Soon Matthew's interest transforms into obsession. He begins to transform himself into the object of his desire: cutting his hair and buying new clothes to look like Matthias.

When Matthias is injured in a motorcycle accident, an opportunity presents itself and Matthew becomes Matthias. Comatose in the hospital, Matthias' waking life, dreams and memories blur. Where the real ends, the artificial begins. Meanwhile, Matthew sinks deeper into his new life. When Matthias finally wakes and confronts him, they embark on a new and strange final chapter.

== Cast ==
- Antoine Lahaie as Matthew
- Nicolas Maxim Endlicher as Matthias
- Nina Kettiger as Corinne
- Vika Kirchenbauer as Matthias' Mother
- Lynn Lahaie as Matthew's Mother
- Ahmad Larnes as Karim
- Antonio Onio as Nurse
- Ivan Rueda as Toilet Trade

== Critical reception ==
Barry Hertz of The Globe and Mail named the film as one of his top 10 Canadian films of 2018, writing "a queer psycho-sexual thriller that's as self-aware as it is engrossing, Lint's film is an impressive feat of curiosity and bravado." Andrew Parker for The GATE called the film "stunning, entrancing, and unnerving," praising it as "one of the most memorable debut features of the year." Kevin Ritchie for NOW Magazine wrote "Minimalism fuels a dreamy atmosphere, but as the action grows torrid M/Ms stylistic boldness eclipses its emotional stakes."

The film was a longlisted nominee for the DGC Discovery Award in 2018.
