= Nejib Belkadhi =

Tunisian actor, film director and film producer

- نجيب بلقاضي
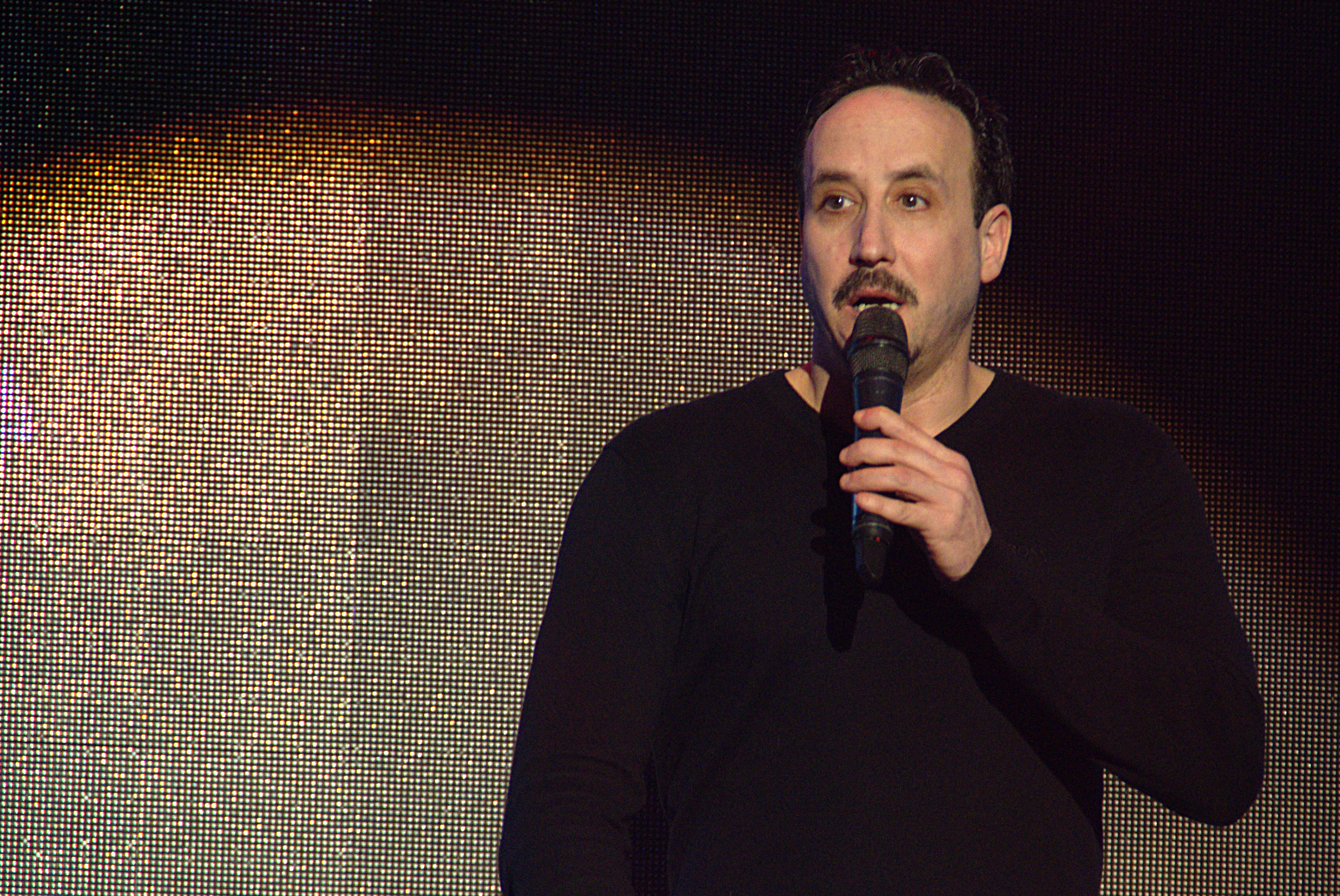
- Belkadhi in February 2015.
- Born: May 13, 1972; Tunis, Tunisia
- Occupations: Actor, director

Nejib Belkadhi (Arabic: نجيب بلقاضي; born May 13, 1976, in Tunis, Tunisia) is a Tunisian actor and director.

== Education ==
He studied marketing and management at the Carthage High Commercial Studies Institute in Carthage, before he started a career in arts.

== Career ==
Nejib had his first acting role in Hbiba Msika (Dancer of the Flame), a film by Selma Baccar, in 1995. He then starred in Mohamed Kouka's play Madrasat Nisaa(مدرسة النساء / The Women's School), however, Nejib's best success was in the series El Khottab Al Bab (الخطاب عالباب /Many Fiancees) appearing in both volumes 1 and 2 (1996–1998) for the director Slaheddine Essid.

Nejib Belkadhi began his career in directing during 1998 on the TV network Canal+ Horizons, covering the Carthage Film Festival, before creating the network's most successful TV show: Chams Alik (شمس عليك ), whose concept revolutionized the Tunisian TV scene. He conceived, produced and co-presented the show from 1999 to 2001.

In 2002, he founded Propaganda Productions, with his friend Imed Marzouk, and in 2003 he directed and produced a socio-critical fake reality show called Dima Lebess (ديما لا باس /Always fine), which was broadcast on the Canal21 TV channel.

He directed his first movie in 2005, a short film called Tsawer (تصاور/Pic), with a screenplay of Souad Ben Slimane.

VHS Kahloucha (2006), his first feature documentary film, was screened to great acclaim at international film festivals, including Cannes (2006), Philadelphia (2007), Sundance l (2007) and Dubai (2007), and it was his most successful work to date.

His last movie, Bastardo, was screened at the Toronto International Film Festival in September 2013.

During Ramadan 2019, he played one of the main roles in the series L'Affaire 460 by Majdi Smiri.

== Filmography ==
=== Actor ===
==== Cinema ====
- 1994: The Fire Dance by Selma Baccar: As Mimouni
- 2000: The Season of Men by Moufida Tlatli : Samy
- 2000: Tomorrow I burn by Mohammed Ben Ismaïl : Elyes
- 2002: The Magic Box by Ridha Béhi
- 2003: Bedwin Hacker by Nadia El Fani
- 2015: Ghasra (Short film) by Jamil Najjar
- 2017: When the sky starts To Scream by Kais Méjri : Samy
- 2017: Astra by Nidhal Guiga
- 2017: The Candy by Abdelhamid Bouchnak
- 2017: Bolbol by Khadija Lamkacher
- 2018: Look at Me by Nejib Belkadhi
- 2018: Black Mamba by Amel Gellaty
- 2018: The Watermelon of The Sheikh by Kaouther Ben Hania

==== Television ====
- 1996 – 1997: El Khottab Al Bab (The Suitors are on the Door) by Slaheddine Essid
- 1998: Il tesoro di Damasco (The Treasure of Damas) by José María Sánchez as Sameer
- 2004: Loutil (The Hostel) by Slaheddine Essid
- 2008: Weld Ettalyena (The Son of the Italian) by Nejib Belkadhi
- 2015: Lilet Chak (The Doubt Night) by Majdi Smiri As Yahiya Ben Abdullah
- 2016: The President by Jamil Najjar As Louay Said
- 2018: Tej El Hadhra by Sami Fehri As General Osman
- 2019: The Affair 460 by Majdi Smiri As Malek Ben Jaafar
- 2021+2022: 13 Garibaldi Avenue by Amin Chiboub

==== Theater ====
- 1995: The Women's School by Mohamed Kouka

=== Director ===
==== Cinema ====
- 2005: Tsawer (Pictures) (Short film)
- 2006: VHS Kahloucha (Documentary)
- 2013: Bastardo (English) (Feature film)
- 2014: Seven and a Half (Documentary)
- 2018: look at Me (film, 2018) (Feature film)

==== Television ====
- 1999–2001: Chams Alik on Canal Horizons+
- 2002: Dima Labes on Canal 21
- 2008: Weld Ettalyena (Son of The Italian) (TV-Serial)
- 2020: The Host and The Tramp (Web-Serial)

==== TV shows ====
- 2013: Klem Ennas (People's Talk) of Lobna Noaman on El Hiwar El Tounsi : Guest of Episode 3 of Season 2
- 2014: Maghreb Orient Express : Nejib Belkadhi : "Bastardo is long awaited in Beyrouth" on TV5 Monde : Guest
- 2021: Fekret Sami Fehri of Hedy Zaiem on El Hiwar El Tounsi : Guest of Episode 9 of Season 3 Part 4

==== Producer ====
- 2006: The Tarzan of the Arabs (Feature Documentary)
- 2017: When The Sun Starts To Cry of Kais Mejri

== Honours ==
- 2007: Knight of the Tunisian Order of Merit
