= Malena Szlam =

Malena Szlam is a Chilean visual artist and filmmaker based in Montreal, Quebec. She is most noted for her 2018 short film Altiplano, which was named to the Toronto International Film Festival's year-end Canada's Top Ten list for short films in 2018.

A graduate of the arts and cinema programs at Concordia University. She was the recipient of the Prix Giverny Capital in 2023.

== Filmography ==
- Chronogram of Inexistent Time (Cronograma de un tiempo inexistente) - 2008
- Anagrams of Light (Anagramas de luz) - 2011
- Beneath Your Skin of Deep Hollow (Bajo tu lámina de agujero profundo) - 2011
- Rhythm Trail - 2011
- Lunar Almanac - 2014
- Altiplano - 2018
- Morphology of a Dream (Morfología de un sueño) - 2018
- Merapi - 2021
- Archipelago of Earthen Bones - To Bunya - 2024
