= Arlen Aguayo-Stewart =

Canadian actress

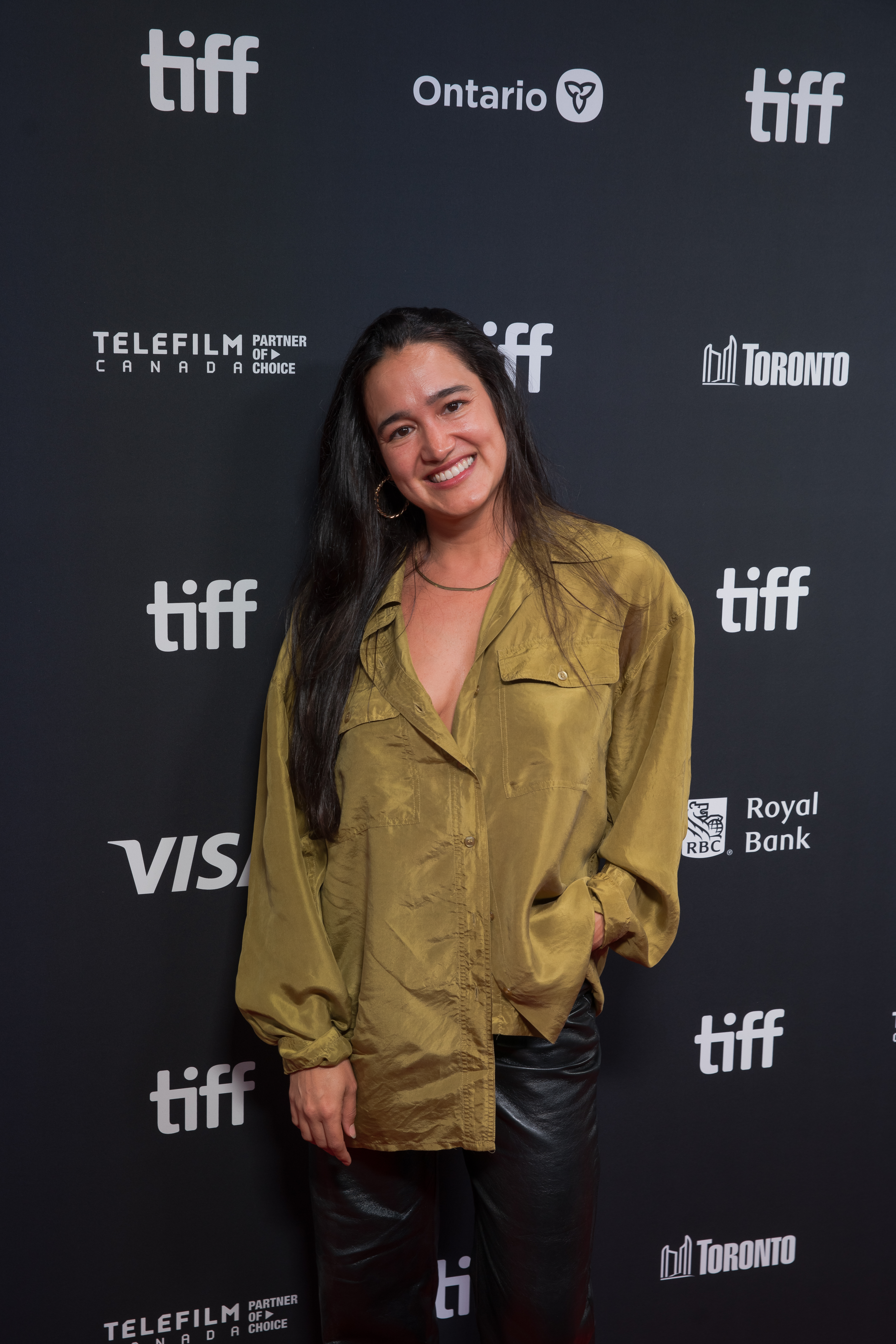
- Arlen Aguayo-Stewart 2025
- Born: Arlen Stewart; Montreal, Quebec, Canada
- Occupation: Actress
- Years active: 1999–present

Arlen Aguayo-Stewart is a Canadian actress. She is most noted for her performance in the film Roads in February (Les routes en février), for which she won the Vancouver Film Critics Circle Award for Best Actress in a Canadian Film. From 2021 to 2022, Aguayo-Stewart starred in the hit Freeform show Motherland: Fort Salem, as Nicte Batan. Her Instagram bio notes that she prefers “any pronouns”.

Roads in February was her first-ever starring role in a film. She previously had small supporting roles in film and television, and played the lead role in a stage production of Sarah Carlsen's play Unseamly. Alongside Deborah Drakeford, Carlos González-Vío, Ryan Hollyman, Andre Sills and Aviva Armour-Ostroff, she was a Dora Mavor Moore Award nominee for Outstanding Ensemble in 2019 for ARC Stage's production of Stef Smith's play Human Animals.

== Filmography ==
=== Film ===
Year	Title	Role	Notes
1999	Dead Silent	Amanda Meyer	
2001	Soother	Nicole Urbain	Short film
2015	In Bed	Sophia	Short film
2015	Stonewall	Columbia Girl (Uncredited)	
2017	Fear the Walking Dead Survival	Caged Citizen	Short film
2018	Zoe	Woman on Lab Tour	
2018	Roads in February	Sara	
2018	On the Basis of Sex	Protest Leader	
2018	Appiness	Pupu	
2018	Curtains: An Installation	Herself	Short
2019	With You Always	Katie	Short film
2019	Date Night	Telenovela Bride	Short film, also director, producer and costumer
2020	Strictly for the Birds	Carrie	Short film
2022	Rosie	Janine	

=== Television ===
Year	Title	Role	Notes
2004	Delta State	Carlita	Voice; 1 episode
2015	Fatal Vows	Young Evie	Episode: "Death in Vegas"
2016	A Stranger in My Home	Ingrid Perez	Episode: "Good Bones"
2017	The Bold Type	Emily	Episode: "The Woman Behind the Clothes"
2018	Taken	Lucia (credited as Arlen Aguayo)	Episode: "Absalom"
2018	In Contempt	Carmen	Episode: "Combat by Agreement"
2020	The Good Doctor	Ambar Estrada	Episodes: "Frontline, Part 1" and "Frontline, Part 2"
2021	Ainsi va Manu (Hogtown)	Mme Gonzales	Miniseries
2021-2022	Motherland: Fort Salem	Nicte Batan	Recurring role (seasons 2 and 3)
2023-2024	Reacher	Milena	2 episodes

=== Video Game ===
Year	Title	Voice
2020	Hyper Scape	Cruze
