= Helen Haig-Brown =

Canadian filmmaker

Helen Haig-Brown is a Tsilhqot'in filmmaker working primarily with indigenous and First Nations themes. Many of these derive from her maternal roots in the Tsilhqot'in First Nation.

== Early life and education ==
Helen Haig-Brown is from the Yunesit'in community of the Tsilhqot'in Nation in British Columbia, Canada. She is the granddaughter of naturalist Roderick Haig-Brown and daughter of Alan Haig-Brown. She graduated from the Indigenous Independent Digital Filmmaking (IIDF) program at Capilano University.

== Career in film ==
Haig-Brown's short drama The Cave (?E?Anx) received funding from the National Film Board and BC Native Arts Council. It was selected for screening at the 2011 Sundance Film Festival and at Berlinale 2010. In 2009 ?E?Anx was named one of Canada's Top Ten Short Films by the Toronto International Film Festival.

Haig-Brown has directed a number of independent documentary films as well as serving as director of photography on others. She contributed to the Knowledge Networks series Our First Voices, with three scripted and directed works in addition to serving as director of photography on the work of colleagues. A recent collaboration with her aunt Dr. Celia Haig-Brown of York University resulted in Pelq'ilc, an account of the Secwepemc Nation's language revitalization programs. Earlier works included Su Naa (My Big Brother) (2005) which she wrote and directed. She completed a feature film, My Legacy, examining the universal and personal theme of mother-daughter relations. The film was screened at the Victoria Film Festival, and was shown on the APTN Network in 2014. The film is supported by an interactive web page.

The film Edge of the Knife, co-directed by Haig-Brown and Gwaai Edenshaw, premiered at the 2018 Toronto International Film Festival. The film was named to the Canada's Top Ten list for 2018, and the duo won the Vancouver Film Critics Circle Award for Best Director of a Canadian Film.
