= Katherine Jerkovic =

Canadian film director

Katherine Jerkovic is a Canadian film director. Her debut feature film, Roads in February (Les routes en février), won the Toronto International Film Festival Award for Best Canadian First Feature Film at the 2018 Toronto International Film Festival. Her second feature, titled Coyote, also opened at TIFF in 2022 and has received several awards.

Of Croatian, Uruguayan and Argentine descent, Jerkovic grew up in Belgium and Uruguay before moving at age 18 to Montreal, where she studied film at Concordia University. She directed the short films Atlas sur l'aube in 2004 and The Winter's Keeper (Le gardien d'hiver) in 2010 before directing Roads in February.

The film was named to the Toronto International Film Festival's year-end Canada's Top Ten list for 2018, and Jerkovic won the Vancouver Film Critics Circle's "One to Watch" award at the Vancouver Film Critics Circle Awards 2018. She was also a nominee for Best Director and Best Screenplay. Her second narrative feature, titled Coyote, began shooting in fall 2021. It premiered at the 2022 Toronto International Film Festival and was awarded Best Canadian Feature and Best Actor (Jorge Martinez Colorado) at the Whistler Film festival. It had its US premiere at the Santa Barbara International Film Festival in competition and won Best Narrative Feature and Best Actor (Jorge Martinez Colorado) at the Brooklyn Film Festival. It has gathered awards for best narrative feature is other festivals such as the Venice Film Week, the Brussels Independent Film Festival and Hong Kong Art House Film festival. She is currently developing her third feature, an English language drama blending social realism and the supernatural genre. The project has been selected to participate in the Whistler Festival Screenwriters Lab in 2023.
