= Roads in February =

2018 film by Katherine Jerkovic

- French: Les Routes en février
- Directed by: Katherine Jerkovic
- Written by: Katherine Jerkovic
- Produced by: Nicolas Comeau; Micaela Sole
- Starring: Arlen Aguayo-Stewart
- Cinematography: Nicolas Canniccioni
- Edited by: Sophie Farkas Bolla
- Music by: Inés Canepa; David Drury
- Production companies: 1976 Productions; Cordón Films
- Release date: 10 September 2018 (TIFF)
- Running time: 84 minutes
- Country: Canada
- Language: Spanish

Roads in February (French: Les routes en février) is a 2018 Canadian drama film directed by Katherine Jerkovic. It was screened in the Contemporary World Cinema section at the 2018 Toronto International Film Festival, where it won the award for Best Canadian First Feature Film. The film centres on Sara (Arlen Aguayo-Stewart), a young Hispanic Canadian woman visiting her grandmother in Uruguay.

== Cast ==
- Arlen Aguayo-Stewart as Sara
- Gloria Demassi as Magda
- Mathias Perdigón as Tincho

== Critical response ==
In December 2018, the Toronto International Film Festival named the film to its annual year-end Canada's Top Ten list. The Vancouver Film Critics Circle awarded Aguayo-Stewart as Best Actress in a Canadian Film and Jerkovic received the One to Watch Award.

Critical response to the film was positive. The Hollywood Reporter's Boyd Van Hoeij called it "a promising debut feature". And Norman Wilner from Now Toronto called Jerkovic "a gifted, intuitive storyteller who doesn't need to oversell her story's emotional undercurrents; she trusts her audience to understand what's going on simply by paying attention to her actors' faces". It scores 86% on Rotten Tomatoes.
