= List of Canadian films of 2013 =

This is a list of Canadian films which were released in 2013:

Title	Director	Cast	Genre	Notes	Ref
30 Ghosts	Sean Cisterna		Documentary		
482-Love	Jacob D. Stein	Joanna M. Gallagher, Jacob D. Stein, Joelle Kutner, Mani Nasry	Romantic comedy		
13 Eerie	Lowell Dean	Katharine Isabelle, Michael Shanks, Brendan Fehr	Horror		
Absences	Carole Laganière	Nathalie Bergeron, Ines Hajrovic, Deni Ellis Béchard	Documentary		
Algonquin	Jonathan Hayes	Mark Rendall, Nicholas Campbell, Sheila McCarthy	Drama		
All That We Make (Fermières)	Annie St-Pierre		Documentary		
All the Wrong Reasons	Gia Milani	Cory Monteith, Karine Vanasse, Kevin Zegers	Drama		
Amsterdam	Stefan Miljevic	Gabriel Sabourin, Louis Champagne, Robin Aubert, Suzanne Clément	Comedy-drama		
Anatomy of Assistance	Cory Bowles				
And Now a Word from Our Sponsor	Zack Bernbaum	Bruce Greenwood, Parker Posey	Comedy-drama		
The Animal Project	Ingrid Veninger	Aaron Poole, Hannah Cheesman, Sarena Parmar	Drama		
Another House (L'autre maison)	Mathieu Roy	Roy Dupuis, Émile Proulx-Cloutier, Marcel Sabourin, Florence Blain Mbaye	Drama		
The Art of the Steal	Jonathan Sobol	Kurt Russell, Jay Baruchel	Comedy		
Arwad	Dominique Chila, Samer Najari	Ramzi Choukair, Fanny Mallette, Julie McClemens, Dalal Ata	Drama		
Asphalt Watches	Shayne Ehman & Seth Scriver		Animated		
Bad Coyote	Jason Andrew Young	Emily Mitchell, Pierre Rompre	Documentary	Focuses in part on the 2009 death of singer-songwriter Taylor Mitchell in a coyote attack	
Beasts in the Real World	Sol Friedman		Animated		
The Beautiful Risk (Le beau risque)	Mark Penney	Shaun Benson, Eliane Gagnon	Drama		
Blood Pressure	Sean Garrity	Michelle Giroux	Drama		
Borealis	David Frazee	Ty Olsson, Michelle Harrison, Patrick Gallagher, Greyston Holt	Science fiction		
Candy	Cassandra Cronenberg				
Cas & Dylan	Jason Priestley	Richard Dreyfuss, Tatiana Maslany	Comedy		
The Chaperone 3D	Fraser Munden, Neil Rathbone		Animated, documentary		
Chi	Anne Wheeler	Babz Chula	Documentary		
Cochemare	Chris Lavis and Maciek Szczerbowski				
Compulsion	Egidio Coccimiglio	Heather Graham, Carrie-Anne Moss, Kevin Dillon, Joe Mantegna	Thriller		
Cottage Country	Peter Wellington	Malin Åkerman, Tyler Labine, Lucy Punch	Comedy		
Crazywater	Dennis Allen		Documentary		
CRIME: Joe Loya - The Beirut Bandit	Alix Lambert, Sam Chou				
Daybreak (Éclat du jour)	Ian Lagarde		Short drama		
The Defector: Escape from North Korea	Ann Shin		Documentary	Made for TV; premiered at Hot Docs	
Destroyer	Kevan Funk			Later expanded into a feature film	
The Dick Knost Show	Bruce Sweeney	Tom Scholte	Comedy		
Diego Star	Frédérick Pelletier	Isaka Sawadogo, Chloé Bourgeois	Drama		
The Dirties	Matt Johnson				
The Dismantling (Le Démantèlement)	Sébastien Pilote	Gabriel Arcand, Pierre-Luc Brillant, Sophie Desmarais	Drama	Prix Jutra - Cinematography	
Down River	Benjamin Ratner	Helen Shaver, Gabrielle Miller, Jennifer Spence, Colleen Rennison	Drama		
Drop	Chris Goldade				
Empire of Dirt	Peter Stebbings	Cara Gee, Shay Eyre, Jennifer Podemski, Luke Kirby	Drama		
The End of Pinky	Clare Blanchet	Heather O'Neill, Marc-André Grondin	3D neo-noir animated short		
Enemy	Denis Villeneuve	Jake Gyllenhaal, Mélanie Laurent, Isabella Rossellini, Sarah Gadon	Thriller	A Canada-Spain co-production; TFCA - Film of the Year	
Escape from Planet Earth	Callan Brunker	voices Brendan Fraser, Rob Corddry, Jessica Alba, Sarah Jessica Parker, William Shatner	Animated feature	Made with U.S. financing	
Evangeline	Karen Lam	Richard Harmon, Kat de Lieva, Mayumi Yoshida	Horror-Thriller	Direct to DVD	
Everyday Is Like Sunday	Pavan Moondi	David Dineen-Porter, Coral Osborne, Adam Gurfinkel, Nick Thorburn	Comedy-drama		
An Extraordinary Person (Quelqu'un d'extraordinaire)	Monia Chokri		Short drama		
The F Word	Michael Dowse	Daniel Radcliffe, Zoe Kazan	Drama		
Finissant(e)s	Rafaël Ouellet		Drama		
Firecrackers	Jasmin Mozaffari			Later expanded into a feature film	
Follow the Fox (Suivre la piste du renard)	Simon Laganière	Mathieu Gosselin, Francis La Haye	Short drama		
Fondi '91	Dev Khanna	Raymond Ablack, Mylène St-Sauveur, Kyle Kirkpatrick	Sports drama		
Foreclosure	Wayne Robinson				
The Four Soldiers (Les 4 soldats)	Robert Morin	Camille Mongeau, Christian de la Cortina, Antoine Bertrand, Aliocha Schneider, Antoine L'Écuyer	Drama		
Frameworks: Images of a Changing World (Dans un océan d'images)	Helen Doyle		Documentary		
Gabrielle	Louise Archambault	Gabrielle Marion-Rivard, Robert Charlebois, Mélissa Désormeaux-Poulin, Alexandre Landry	Drama	Prix Jutra - Director, Screenplay, Editing, Supporting Actress (Désormeaux-Poulin)	
Gaspé Copper	Alexis Fortier Gauthier	Laurie Bissonnette, Annick Bourassa, Martin Desgagné, Mathieu Gagné, Dérick Livernoche	Short drama		
Gerontophilia	Bruce LaBruce	Walter Borden, Pier-Gabriel Lajoie, Marie-Hélène Thibault, Katie Boland	Drama		
Gloria Victoria	Theodore Ushev		National Film Board 3D animated short	FIPRESCI prize at Annecy	
A Grand Canal	Johnny Ma		Short drama		
The Grand Seduction	Don McKellar	Taylor Kitsch, Brendan Gleeson, Liane Balaban, Gordon Pinsent	Comedy	A remake of the 2003 film Seducing Doctor Lewis	
Hi-Ho Mistahey!	Alanis Obomsawin		National Film Board Documentary	profiles Shannen's Dream	
Hunting the Northern Godard (La Chasse au Godard d'Abbittibbi)	Éric Morin	Martin Dubreuil, Sophie Desmarais, Alexandre Castonguay	Drama		
The Husband	Bruce McDonald	Maxwell McCabe-Lokos, Sarah Allen	Comedy		
Impromptu	Bruce Alcock				
In Guns We Trust	Nicolas Lévesque				
It Was You Charlie	Emmanuel Shirinian	Michael D. Cohen, Emma Fleury, Aaron Abrams	Comedy-drama		
Une jeune fille	Catherine Martin		Drama		
Jimbo	Ryan Flowers				
The Last Pogo Jumps Again	Colin Brunton, Kire Paputts	Teenage Head, The Viletones	Documentary		
Lawrence & Holloman	Matthew Kowalchuk	Daniel Arnold, Ben Cotton, Katharine Isabelle, Amy Matysio	Comedy		
Lay Over	Jordan Hayes				
The Legend of Sarila	Nancy Florence Savard	voices Dustin Milligan, Rachelle Lefevre, Tim Rozon, Christopher Plummer, Geneviève Bujold	Animated feature in 3D		
Life's a Bitch (Toutes des connes)	François Jaros	Guillaume Lambert	Short comedy-drama		
Louis Cyr	Daniel Roby	Antoine Bertrand, Guillaume Cyr, Gilbert Sicotte, Gil Bellows, Marilyn Castonguay	Biographical drama	Prix Jutra - Best Picture, Actor (Bertrand), Supporting Actor (Cyr), Art Direction, Costumes, Makeup, Hair, Sound	
Maïna	Michel Poulette	Roseanne Supernault, Graham Greene, Tantoo Cardinal, Eric Schweig, Natar Ungalaaq	Historical drama		
Mama	Andres Muschietti	Jessica Chastain, Nikolaj Coster-Waldau	Horror	Canada-Spain co-production	
Mary & Myself	Sam Decoste		Animated documentary		
Meetings with a Young Poet	Rudy Barichello	Stephen McHattie, Vincent Hoss-Desmarais, Maria de Medeiros	Drama		
The Meteor (Le Météore)	François Delisle	François Delisle, Noémie Godin-Vigneau	Drama		
Method	Gregory Smith				
A Mile End Tale (Conte du Mile End)	Jean-François Lesage		Documentary		
Molly Maxwell	Sara St. Onge	Lola Tash, Charlie Carrick	Drama		
The Mortal Instruments: City of Bones	Harald Zwart	Lily Collins, Jamie Campbell Bower, Robert Sheehan, Kevin Zegers, Jemima West, Godfrey Gao, Lena Headey, Jonathan Rhys Meyers, Aidan Turner, Kevin Durand, Jared Harris	Action-adventure science fantasy	A Canada-German co-production based on the first book of The Mortal Instruments series by Cassandra Clare; Golden Reel Award; Canadian Screen Awards - Make-Up, Sound, Visual Effects.	
My Prairie Home	Chelsea McMullan	Rae Spoon	National Film Board Documentary		
NCR: Not Criminally Responsible	John Kastner		National Film Board Documentary	premiere at Hot Docs	
Noah	Walter Woodman, Patrick Cederberg	Sam Kantor, Caitlin McConkey-Pirie	Short film	Canadian Screen Award winner for Best Live Action Short Drama	
Numbers & Friends	Alexander Carson				
Oil Sands Karaoke	Charles Wilkinson	Dan Debrabandere, Chad Ellis, Massey Whiteknife, Brandy Willier	Documentary		
Our Man in Tehran	Larry Weinstein & Drew Taylor	Kenneth D. Taylor	Documentary	Canadian Screen Awards - Best Documentary Program	
Out	Jeremy LaLonde	David Tompa, David Huband, Rosemary Doyle, Paula Brancati, Tommie-Amber Pirie	Short comedy-drama		
The Oxbow Cure	Yonah Lewis, Calvin Thomas	Claudia Dey	Drama		
Paradise Falls	Fantavious Fritz	Alex Crowther, Alistair Ball, Uri Livene-Bar, Daiva Zalnieriunas	Short, horror, comedy		
Paradiso	Devan Scott				
Pilgrims	Marie Clements				
Please Kill Mr. Know It All	Colin Carter & Sandra Feldman	Lara Jean Chorostecki, Jefferson Brown	Romantic comedy		
Portrait as a Random Act of Violence	Randall Okita				
Québékoisie	Mélanie Carrier, Olivier Higgins		Documentary		
Relax, I'm from the Future	Luke Higginson	Zachary Bennett, Rick Roberts	Short, comedy	Later expanded into a 2022 feature film	
Remember Me (Mémorable moi)	Jean-François Asselin	Émile Proulx-Cloutier	Short drama		
Rhymes for Young Ghouls	Jeff Barnaby	Kawennáhere Devery Jacobs, Glen Gould	Drama		
The Right Kind of Wrong	Jeremiah S. Chechik	Ryan Kwanten, Will Sasso, Catherine O'Hara	Romance		
Riptide (Ressac)	Pascale Ferland	Martin Dubreuil, Muriel Dutil	Drama		
The River's Lazy Flow (Le courant faible de la rivière)	Joël Vaudreuil	Animated short			
Roaming	Michael Ray Fox	Cory Bowles, Rhys Bevan-John, Christina Cuffari	Drama	"Best Feature" Toronto Independent Film Festival	
Rock Paper Scissors (Roche papier ciseaux)	Yan Lanouette Turgeon	Roy Dupuis, Remo Girone	Crime drama	Prix Jutra - Original Score	
Roland	Trevor Cornish				
Sam's Formalwear	Yael Staav	Judah Katz, Kristina Nicoll, Sofie Uretsky	Short drama		
Sarah Prefers to Run (Sarah préfère la course)	Chloé Robichaud	Hélène Florent, Sophie Desmarais, Micheline Lanctôt	Drama		
Seasick	Eva Cvijanovic		Animated		
Señoritas	Lina Rodríguez	María Serrano, Clara Monroy, Angela Katherine Laverde	Drama	Colombian-Canadian coproduction	
Sex After Kids	Jeremy Lalonde	Zoie Palmer, Paul Amos, Katie Boland, Kristin Booth	Comedy		
Siddharth	Richie Mehta	Rajesh Tailang	Drama	Canada-India co-production	
Singularity Principle	David Robert Deranian & Austin Robert Hines	William B. Davis	science fiction film	Canada-Bahamas-Australia co-production made with U.S. financing	
The Sower (Le semeur)	Julie Perron	Patrice Fortier	Documentary		
The Sparkling River	Felix Lajeunesse, Paul Raphaël				
Stay	Wiebke von Carolsfeld		Drama		
The Storm Within (Rouge sang)	Martin Doepner	Isabelle Guérard, Lothaire Bluteau, Anthony Lemke	Drama/thriller		
Subconscious Password	Chris Landreth	Chris Landreth, John Dilworth	3-D animated short	best short film at Annecy International Animated Film Festival	
Time Flies (Nous avions)	Stéphane Moukarzel		Short drama		
That Burning Feeling	Jason James	Paulo Costanzo, Ingrid Haas, Tyler Labine, John Cho	Comedy		
A Time Is a Terrible Thing to Waste	Leslie Supnet		Animated short		
Tom at the Farm (Tom à la ferme)	Xavier Dolan	Xavier Dolan, Pierre-Yves Cardinal, Evelyne Brochu, Manuel Tadros	Adaptation of a play by Michel Marc Bouchard,	Prix Jutra - Supporting Actor (Cardinal)	
Triptych (Triptyque)	Pedro Pires & Robert Lepage	Frédérike Bédard, Lise Castonguay, Hans Piesbergen	Drama		
Tru Love	Shauna MacDonald & Kate Johnston	Shauna MacDonald, Kate Trotter, Christine Horne	Drama		
Unclaimed	Michael Jorgensen	John Hartley Robertson	Documentary	premiere at Hot Docs	
Der Untermensch	Kays Mejri				
Uvanga	Marie-Hélène Cousineau and Madeline Ivalu	Peter-Henry Arnatsiaq, Marianne Farley, Madeline Ivalu	Drama		
Vic and Flo Saw a Bear (Vic et Flo ont vu un ours)	Denis Côté	Marc-André Grondin, Romane Bohringer, Pierrette Robitaille	drama	Entered into the 63rd Berlin International Film Festival; Prix Jutra - Actress (Robitaille)	
Waiting for Spring (En attendant le printemps)	Marie Geneviève Chabot		Documentary	Prix Jutra - Documentary	
Watermark	Jennifer Baichwal & Edward Burtynsky		Documentary	TFCA - Best Canadian Film; Best Feature Length Documentary - Canadian Screen Awards	
We Wanted More	Stephen Dunn				
When Jews Were Funny	Alan Zweig		Documentary	TIFF - Best Canadian Feature	
Whitewash	Emanuel Hoss-Desmarais	Thomas Haden Church, Anie Pascale, Marc Labrèche	Drama	Winner of the Claude Jutra Award	
Yellowhead	Kevan Funk	Paul McGillion, Michael Kopsa, Kurt Max Runte	Short drama		
The Young and Prodigious T.S. Spivet	Jean-Pierre Jeunet	Kyle Catlett, Niamh Wilson, Helena Bonham Carter, Kathy Bates, Callum Keith Rennie	Drama	Canada-France-Australia co-production	
Young Wonder	James Wilkes		Short		

== See also ==
- 2013 in Canada
- 2013 in Canadian television
