= 2013 Toronto International Film Festival =

Annual Canadian film festival

- Festival poster
- Opening film: The Fifth Estate
- Closing film: Life of Crime
- Location: Toronto, Ontario, Canada
- Awards: 12 Years a Slave (People's Choice Award)
- Hosted by: Toronto International Film Festival Group
- No. of films: 366
- Festival date: September 5, 2013–September 15, 2013
- Language: English
- Website: tiff.net
- 2014 2012

The 38th annual Toronto International Film Festival (TIFF) took place in Toronto, Ontario, Canada between September 5 and 15, 2013. The Fifth Estate was selected as the opening film and Life of Crime was the closing film. 75 films were added to the festival line-up in August. A total of 366 films from 70 countries were screened, including 146 world premieres.

== Awards ==
Award	Film	Director
People's Choice Award	12 Years a Slave	Steve McQueen
People's Choice Award First Runner Up	Philomena	Stephen Frears
People's Choice Award Second Runner Up	Prisoners	Denis Villeneuve
People's Choice Award, Documentary Winner	The Square (Al-Midan)	Jehane Noujaim
People's Choice Award, Documentary First Runner Up	Hi-Ho Mistahey!	Alanis Obomsawin
People's Choice Award, Documentary Second Runner Up	Beyond the Edge	Leanne Pooley
People's Choice Award, Midnight Madness Winner	Why Don't You Play in Hell?	Sion Sono
People's Choice Award, Midnight Madness First Runner Up	Oculus	Mike Flanagan
People's Choice Award, Midnight Madness Second Runner Up	Witching and Bitching	Álex de la Iglesia
Best Canadian Feature Film	When Jews Were Funny	Alan Zweig
Best Canadian Short Film	Noah	Walter Woodman and Patrick Cederberg
Best Canadian First Feature Film	Asphalt Watches	Shayne Ehman and Seth Scriver
FIPRESCI Discovery	The Amazing Catfish	Claudia Sainte-Luce
Grolsch Film Works Discovery Award	All the Wrong Reasons	Gia Milani
FIPRESCI Special Presentations	Ida	Paweł Pawlikowski
Netpac Award for World or International Asian Film Premiere	Qissa	Anup Singh

== Programme ==
=== Gala Presentations ===
- American Dreams in China by Peter Chan
- The Art of the Steal by Jonathan Sobol
- August: Osage County by John Wells
- Blood Ties by Guillaume Canet
- Bright Days Ahead by Marion Vernoux
- Cold Eyes by Cho Ui-seok and Kim Byeong-seo
- The Fifth Estate by Bill Condon
- The Grand Seduction by Don McKellar
- Kill Your Darlings by John Krokidas
- Life of Crime by Daniel Schechter
- The Love Punch by Joel Hopkins
- The Lunchbox by Ritesh Batra
- Mandela: Long Walk to Freedom by Justin Chadwick
- Parkland by Peter Landesman
- The Railway Man by Jonathan Teplitzky
- The Right Kind of Wrong by Jeremiah S. Chechik
- Rush by Ron Howard
- Shuddh Desi Romance (English title: A Random Desi Romance) by Maneesh Sharma
- Supermensch: The Legend of Shep Gordon by Mike Myers
- Words and Pictures by Fred Schepisi

=== Special Presentations ===
- 12 Years a Slave by Steve McQueen
- All Is by My Side by John Ridley
- The Armstrong Lie by Alex Gibney
- Attila Marcel by Sylvain Chomet
- Bad Words by Jason Bateman
- Belle by Amma Asante
- Blind Detective by Johnnie To
- Blue Is the Warmest Colour by Abdellatif Kechiche
- Burning Bush by Agnieszka Holland
- Can a Song Save Your Life? by John Carney
- Caníbal by Manuel Martín Cuenca
- Child of God by James Franco
- Dallas Buyers Club by Jean-Marc Vallée
- Devil's Knot by Atom Egoyan
- The Disappearance of Eleanor Rigby by Ned Benson
- Dom Hemingway by Richard Shepard
- Don Jon by Joseph Gordon-Levitt
- The Double by Richard Ayoade
- Enemy by Denis Villeneuve
- Enough Said by Nicole Holofcener
- Exit Marrakech by Caroline Link
- The F Word by Michael Dowse
- The Face of Love by Arie Posin
- Fading Gigolo by John Turturro
- Felony by Matthew Saville
- The Finishers by Nils Tavernier
- For Those Who Can Tell No Tales by Jasmila Žbanić
- Gabrielle by Louise Archambault
- Gloria by Sebastián Lelio
- Going Away by Nicole Garcia
- Gravity by Alfonso Cuarón
- The Great Beauty by Paolo Sorrentino
- Half of a Yellow Sun by Biyi Bandele
- Hateship, Loveship by Liza Johnson
- How I Live Now by Kevin Macdonald
- The Husband by Bruce McDonald
- Ida by Paweł Pawlikowski
- L'intrepido by Gianni Amelio
- The Invisible Woman by Ralph Fiennes
- Joe by David Gordon Green
- Labor Day by Jason Reitman
- The Last of Robin Hood by Richard Glatzer, Wash Westmoreland
- The Liberator by Alberto Arvelo
- Like Father, Like Son by Hirokazu Koreeda
- Love Is the Perfect Crime by Arnaud Larrieu, Jean-Marie Larrieu
- Lucky Them by Megan Griffiths
- Man of Tai Chi by Keanu Reeves
- Mary Queen of Scots by Thomas Imbach
- Mystery Road by Ivan Sen
- Night Moves by Kelly Reichardt
- Omar by Hany Abu-Assad
- One Chance by David Frankel
- Only Lovers Left Alive by Jim Jarmusch
- The Past by Asghar Farhadi
- Philomena by Stephen Frears
- Pioneer by Erik Skjoldbjærg
- Prisoners by Denis Villeneuve
- A Promise by Patrice Leconte
- Quai d'Orsay by Bertrand Tavernier
- Real by Kiyoshi Kurosawa
- Rock the Casbah by Laïla Marrakchi
- Singing Women by Reha Erdem
- Southcliffe by Sean Durkin
- Starred Up by David Mackenzie
- Sunshine on Leith by Dexter Fletcher
- Therese by Charlie Stratton
- Third Person by Paul Haggis
- Those Happy Years by Daniele Luchetti
- Tom at the Farm by Xavier Dolan
- Tracks by John Curran
- Under the Skin by Jonathan Glazer
- Unforgiven by Lee Sang-il
- Violette by Martin Provost
- Visitors by Godfrey Reggio
- Walesa. Man of Hope by Andrzej Wajda
- Watermark by Jennifer Baichwal, Edward Burtynsky
- We Are the Best! by Lukas Moodysson
- Le Week-End by Roger Michell
- The Wind Rises by Hayao Miyazaki
- You Are Here by Matthew Weiner
- Young & Beautiful by François Ozon

=== Mavericks ===
- 12.12.12. by Thom Powers
- For No Good Reason by Charlie Paul
- I Am Somebody by Madeline Anderson
- In Conversation With...Irrfan Khan by Cameron Bailey
- In Conversation With...Spike Jonze by Cameron Bailey
- InRealLife by Beeban Kidron
- Made in America by Ron Howard
- Our Man in Tehran by Larry Weinstein and Drew Taylor
- What is Cinema? by Chuck Workman

=== Documentaries ===
- Un Voyageur by Marcel Ophüls
- At Berkeley by Frederick Wiseman
- Beyond the Edge by Leanne Pooley
- Burt's Buzz by Jody Shapiro
- The Dark Matter of Love by Sarah McCarthy
- The Dog by Allison Berg and Frank Keraudren
- Faith Connections by Pan Nalin
- Filthy Gorgeous: The World of Bob Guccione by Barry Avrich
- Finding Vivian Maier by John Maloof and Charlie Siskel
- Hi-Ho Mistahey! by Alanis Obomsawin.
- Ignasi M. by Ventura Pons
- Jodorowsky's Dune by Frank Pavich
- Le Dernier des injustes by Claude Lanzmann
- El Alcalde by Emiliano Altuna Fistolera
- Midway by Chris Jordan
- Mission Congo by David Turner and Lara Zizic
- The Square (Al-Midan) by Jehane Noujaim
- A Story of Children and Film by Mark Cousins
- Tim's Vermeer by Teller
- The Unknown Known by Errol Morris
- Unstable Elements by Madeleine Sackler
- When Jews Were Funny by Alan Zweig

=== Midnight Madness ===
- Afflicted by Derek Lee and Clif Prowse
- All Cheerleaders Die by Lucky McKee and Chris Sivertson
- Almost Human by Joe Begos
- The Green Inferno by Eli Roth
- Oculus by Mike Flanagan
- R100 by Hitoshi Matsumoto
- Rigor Mortis by Juno Mak
- Blutgletscher by Marvin Kren
- Why Don't You Play in Hell? by Sion Sono
- Witching and Bitching by Álex de la Iglesia

=== Vanguard ===
- Asphalt Watches by Shayne Ehman and Seth Scriver
- Blue Ruin by Jeremy Saulnier
- Borgman by Alex van Warmerdam
- Celestial Wives of the Meadow Mari by Aleksei Fedorchenko
- The Fake by Yeon Sang-ho
- Gerontophilia by Bruce LaBruce
- Horns by Alexandre Aja
- People in Places by Juan Cavestany
- Proxy by Zack Parker
- The Sacrament by Ti West
- Sapi by Brillante Mendoza
- Sex, Drugs & Taxation by Christoffer Boe
- Soul by Chung Mong-Hong
- The Strange Colour of Your Body's Tears by Hélène Cattet and Bruno Forzani
- Thou Gild'st the Even by Onur Ünlü
- We Gotta Get Out of This Place by Simon Hawkins and Zeke Hawkins

=== Contemporary World Cinema ===
- The Animal Project by Ingrid Veninger
- Bad Hair by Mariana Rondón
- Bastardo by Nejib Belkadhi
- Berea by Vincent Moloi
- The Bit Player by Jeffrey Jeturian
- Blind Dates by Levan Koguashvili
- Brazilian Western by René Sampaio
- Break Loose by Alexei Uchitel
- Child's Pose by Călin Peter Netzer
- Cinemanovels by Terry Miles
- Club Sandwich by Fernando Eimbcke
- Cristo Rey by Leticia Tonos
- The Dick Knost Show by Bruce Sweeney
- The Dinner by Menno Meyjes
- Eastern Boys by Robin Campillo
- El Mudo by Diego Vega, Daniel Vega
- Empire of Dirt by Peter Stebbings
- An Episode in the Life of an Iron Picker by Danis Tanović
- Friends from France by Anne Weil, Philippe Kotlarski
- Giselle by Toa Fraser
- Le Grand Cahier by János Szász
- Heart of a Lion by Dome Karukoski
- Homecoming by Jim Chuchu
- Honeymoon by Jan Hřebejk
- Hotell by Lisa Langseth
- The Immoral by Lars Daniel Krutzkoff Jacobsen
- Intruders by Noh Young-seok
- iNumber Number by Donovan Marsh
- The Kids from the Port by Alberto Morais
- Kwaku Ananse by Akosua Adoma Owusu
- Ladder to Damascus by Mohammad Malas
- Le Démantèlement by Sébastien Pilote
- Life's a Breeze by Lance Daly
- Little Feet by Alexandre Rockwell
- The Major by Yuri Bykov
- Manuscripts Don't Burn by Mohammad Rasoulof
- McCanick by Josh C. Waller
- Metalhead by Ragnar Bragason
- Ningen by Guillaume Giovanetti, Cagla Zencirci
- Noye's Fludde by Mark Dornford-May
- October November by Götz Spielmann
- Old Moon by Raisa Bonnet
- Palestine Stereo by Rashid Masharawi
- Paradise: Hope by Ulrich Seidl
- A Place in Heaven by Yossi Madmoni
- Qissa by Anup Singh
- Rags and Tatters by Ahmad Abdalla
- The Sea by Stephen Brown
- The Selfish Giant by Clio Barnard
- Siddharth by Richie Mehta
- Something Necessary by Judy Kibinge
- Stay by Wiebke von Carolsfeld
- Stop the Pounding Heart by Roberto Minervini
- Stranger by the Lake by Alain Guiraudie
- This Is Sanlitun by Róbert Ingi Douglas
- To Repel Ghosts by Philippe Lacôte
- Unbeatable by Dante Lam
- Under the Starry Sky by Dyana Gaye
- A Journey by Catherine Martin
- When Evening Falls on Bucharest or Metabolism by Corneliu Porumboiu
- White Lies by Dana Rotberg
- A Wolf at the Door by Fernando Coimbra
- The Wonders by Avi Nesher

=== Contemporary World Speakers ===
- Cristo Rey by Leticia Tonos
- Qissa by Anup Singh
- The Wonders by Avi Nesher

=== Masters ===
- Abuse of Weakness by Catherine Breillat
- Bastards by Claire Denis
- Closed Curtain by Jafar Panahi and Kambuzia Partovi
- Concrete Night by Pirjo Honkasalo
- Home From Home - Chronicle of a Vision by Edgar Reitz
- How Strange to be Named Federico: Scola narrates Fellini by Ettore Scola
- Moebius by Kim Ki-duk
- Norte, the End of History by Lav Diaz
- Our Sunhi by Hong Sang-soo
- A Touch of Sin by Jia Zhangke
- Triptych (Triptyque) by Robert Lepage and Pedro Pires

=== City to City: Athens ===
- The Daughter by Thanos Anastopoulos
- The Eternal Return of Antonis Paraskevas by Elina Psykou
- J.A.C.E. - Just Another Confused Elephant by Menelaos Karamaghiolis
- Miss Violence by Alexandros Avranas
- September by Penny Panayotopoulou
- Standing Aside, Watching by Yorgos Servetas
- To the Wolf by Aran Hughes and Christina Koutsospyrou
- Unfair World by Filippos Tsitos
- Wasted Youth by Argyris Papadimitropoulos and Jan Vogel
- Wild Duck by Yannis Sakaridis

=== Discovery ===
- 1982 by Tommy Oliver
- All About the Feathers by Neto Villalobos
- The Amazing Catfish by Claudia Sainte-Luce
- All the Wrong Reasons by Gia Milani
- Around the Block by Sarah Spillane
- Bends by Flora Lau
- Beneath the Harvest Sky by Aron Gaudet and Gita Pullapilly
- Bethlehem by Yuval Adler
- Bobô by Inês Oliveira
- Border by Alessio Cremonini
- Canopy by Aaron Wilson
- Fat by Mark Phinney
- Giraffada by Rani Massalha
- I Am Yours by Iram Haq
- Ilo Ilo by Anthony Chen
- The Militant by Manolo Nieto
- Miracle by Juraj Lehotský
- My Love Awaits Me by the Sea by Mais Darwazah
- Of Good Report by Jahmil X.T. Qubeka
- Rhymes for Young Ghouls by Jeff Barnaby
- Palo Alto by Gia Coppola
- Paraíso by Mariana Chenillo
- Sarah Prefers to Run by Chloé Robichaud
- Salvation Army by Abdellah Taïa
- South Is Nothing by Fabio Mollo
- The Stag by John Butler
- The Summer of Flying Fish by Marcela Said
- Trap Street by Vivian Qu

=== Short Cuts Canada ===
- Anatomy of Assistance by Cory Bowles
- Beasts in the Real World by Sol Friedman
- Candy by Cassandra Cronenberg
- The Chaperone 3D by Fraser Munden and Neil Rathbone
- Cochemare by Chris Lavis and Maciek Szczerbowski
- CRIME: Joe Loya - The Beirut Bandit by Alix Lambert and Sam Chou
- Daybreak (Éclat du jour) by Ian Lagarde
- Destroyer by Kevan Funk
- Der Untermensch by Kays Mejri
- Drop by Chris Goldade
- The End of Pinky by Claire Blanchet
- An Extraordinary Person (Quelqu'un d'extraordinaire) by Monia Chokri
- Firecrackers by Jasmin Mozaffari
- Foreclosure by Wayne Robinson
- Gloria Victoria by Theodore Ushev
- A Grand Canal by Johnny Ma
- Impromptu by Bruce Alcock
- In Guns We Trust by Nicolas Lévesque
- Jimbo by Ryan Flowers
- Lay Over by Jordan Hayes
- Method by Gregory Smith
- Noah by Patrick Cederberg and Walter Woodman
- Numbers & Friends by Alexander Carson
- Out by Jeremy Lalonde
- Paradise Falls by Fantavious Fritz
- Paradiso by Devan Scott
- Pilgrims by Marie Clements
- Portrait as a Random Act of Violence by Randall Okita
- Relax, I'm from the Future by Luke Higginson
- Remember Me (Mémorable moi) by Jean-Francois Asselin
- Roland by Trevor Cornish
- Sam's Formalwear by Yael Staav
- Seasick by Eva Cvijanovic
- The Sparkling River by Felix Lajeunesse and Paul Raphaël
- Subconscious Password by Chris Landreth
- A Time is a Terrible Thing to Waste by Leslie Supnet
- Time Flies (Nous avions) by Stéphane Moukarzel
- We Wanted More by Stephen Dunn
- Yellowhead by Kevan Funk
- Young Wonder by James Wilkes

=== Wavelengths ===
- A Thousand Suns and Letter to a Refusing Pilot by Mati Diop and Akram Zaatari
- Airships by Kenneth Anger
- Bann by Nina Könnemann
- A Batalha de Tabatô by Joao Viana
- Brimstone Line by Chris Kennedy
- Konstellationen by Helga Fanderl
- Un Conte de Michel Montaigne by Jean-Marie Straub
- The Disquiet by Ali Cherri
- Dry Standpipe by Wojciech Bakowski
- El Adios Largos by Andrew Lampert
- Farther Than the Eye Can See by Basma Alsharif
- A Field in England by Ben Wheatley
- Flower by Naoko Tasaka
- Gowanus Canal by Sarah J. Christman
- I'm the same I'm an other by Caroline Strubbe
- Instants by Hannes Schüpbach
- La última película by Raya Martin and Mark Peranson
- Le Conte de Michel de Montaigne and The King's Body and Redemption by Jean-Marie Straub, João Pedro Rodrigues and Miguel Gomes
- Letter to a Refusing Pilot by Akram Zaatari
- Listening to the Space in my Room by Robert Beavers
- Main Hall by Philipp Fleischmann
- Homme en Mouvement, 2012 by Christophe M. Saber, Ruben Glauser and Max Idje
- Manakamana by Stephanie Spray and Pacho Velez
- L'image manquante by Rithy Panh
- Mount Song by Shambhavi Kaul
- Natpwe, le festin des esprits by Tiane Doan na Champassak and Jean Dubrel
- Nefandus by Carlos Motta
- Pays Barbare by Angela Ricci Lucchi and Yervant Gianikian
- Pepper's Ghost by Stephen Broomer
- The Police Officer's Wife by Philip Gröning
- Pop Takes by Luther Price
- The Realist by Scott Stark
- Redemption by Miguel Gomes
- RP31 by Lucy Raven
- La última película by Raya Martin and Mark Peranson
- Song by Nathaniel Dorsky
- A Spell to Ward Off the Darkness by Ben Russell
- Spring by Nathaniel Dorsky
- Historia de la meva mort by Albert Serra
- The Strange Little Cat by Ramon Zürcher
- Stray Dogs by Tsai Ming Liang
- O Corpo de Afonso by João Pedro Rodrigues
- Mille Soleils by Mati Diop
- Trois exercises d'interpretation by Cristi Puiu
- Three Landscapes by Peter Hutton
- Trissákia 3 by Nick Collins
- Variations on a Cellophane Wrapper by David Rimmer

=== TIFF Kids ===
- Amazonia by Thierry Ragobert
- Antboy by Ask Hasselbalch
- Khumba by Anthony Silverston
- The Adventures of Goopy and Bagha by Shilpa Ranade
- Zip & Zap and the Marble Gang by Óskar Santos
- Miffy the Movie by Hans Perk

=== TIFF Cinematheque ===
- An Autumn Afternoon by Yasujirō Ozu
- Gun Crazy by Joseph H. Lewis
- Hiroshima mon amour by Alain Resnais
- Le Joli Mai by Chris Marker and Pierre Lhomme
- Manila in the Claws of Light by Lino Brocka
- Rome, Open City by Roberto Rossellini
- Shivers by David Cronenberg

=== Future Projections ===
- David Cronenberg Transformation
- Grosse Fatigue by Camille Henrot
- Introduction to the Memory Personality by Jeremy Shaw
- Ralph Steadman For No Good Reason by Ralph Steadman
- Rough Cut (Hiker Meat) by Jamie Shovlin
- Swarm by James Coupe
- Sweat by Radical Friend (Kirby McClure and Julia Grigorian)
- Treatment by Candice Breitz
- A Jester's Dance by Marcel Dzama
- walkthrough by Laurel Woodcock

=== Next Wave ===
- Around the Block by Sarah Spillane
- Beneath the Harvest Sky by Aron Gaudet and Gita Pullapilly
- The Finishers by Nils Tavernier
- Giraffada by Rani Massalha
- How I Live Now by Kevin Macdonald
- Palo Alto by Gia Coppola
- The Square (Al-Midan) by Jehane Noujaim
- Tracks by John Curran

=== Manifesto ===
- All Is by My Side by John Ridley
- Belle by Amma Asante
- Cristo Rey by Leticia Tonos
- Empire of Dirt by Peter Stebbings
- Half of a Yellow Sun by Biyi Bandele
- Made in America by Ron Howard
- Omar by Hany Abu-Assad
- Starred Up by David Mackenzie
- Supermensch: The Legend of Shep Gordon by Mike Myers
- Words and Pictures by Fred Schepisi

=== TIFF Special Event ===
- The Big Chill by Lawrence Kasdan
- Jason Reitman's Live Read by Jason Reitman
- Metallica: Through the Never by Nimród Antal
- The Wizard of Oz by Victor Fleming

== Canada's Top Ten ==
TIFF's annual Canada's Top Ten list, its national critics and festival programmers poll of the ten best feature and short films of the year, was released on December 3, 2013.

=== Feature films ===
- Asphalt Watches — Shayne Ehman, Seth Scriver
- Enemy — Denis Villeneuve
- The F Word — Michael Dowse
- Gabrielle — Louise Archambault
- Rhymes for Young Ghouls — Jeff Barnaby
- Sarah Prefers to Run (Sarah préfère la course) — Chloé Robichaud
- Tom at the Farm (Tom à la ferme) — Xavier Dolan
- Vic and Flo Saw a Bear (Vic et Flo ont vu un ours) — Denis Côté
- Watermark — Jennifer Baichwal, Edward Burtynsky
- When Jews Were Funny — Alan Zweig

=== Short films ===
- A Grand Canal — Johnny Ma
- The Chaperone 3D — Fraser Munden, Neil Rathbone
- The End of Pinky — Claire Blanchet
- An Extraordinary Person (Quelqu'un d'extraordinaire) — Monia Chokri
- In Guns We Trust — Nicolas Lévesque
- Noah — Walter Woodman, Patrick Cederberg
- Paradise Falls — Fantavious Fritz
- Subconscious Password — Chris Landreth
- Time Flies (Nous avions) — Stéphane Moukarzel
- Yellowhead — Kevan Funk
