= Vancouver Film Critics Circle Awards 2016 =

Annual Canadian film awards ceremony

The nominations for the 17th Vancouver Film Critics Circle Awards, honoring the best in filmmaking in 2016, were announced on December 16, 2016. Manchester by the Sea led with six nominations, when Moonlight with four and La La Land with three nominations.

The winners were announced on December 20, 2016. Manchester by the Sea won five awards, including Best Film.

== Winners and nominees ==
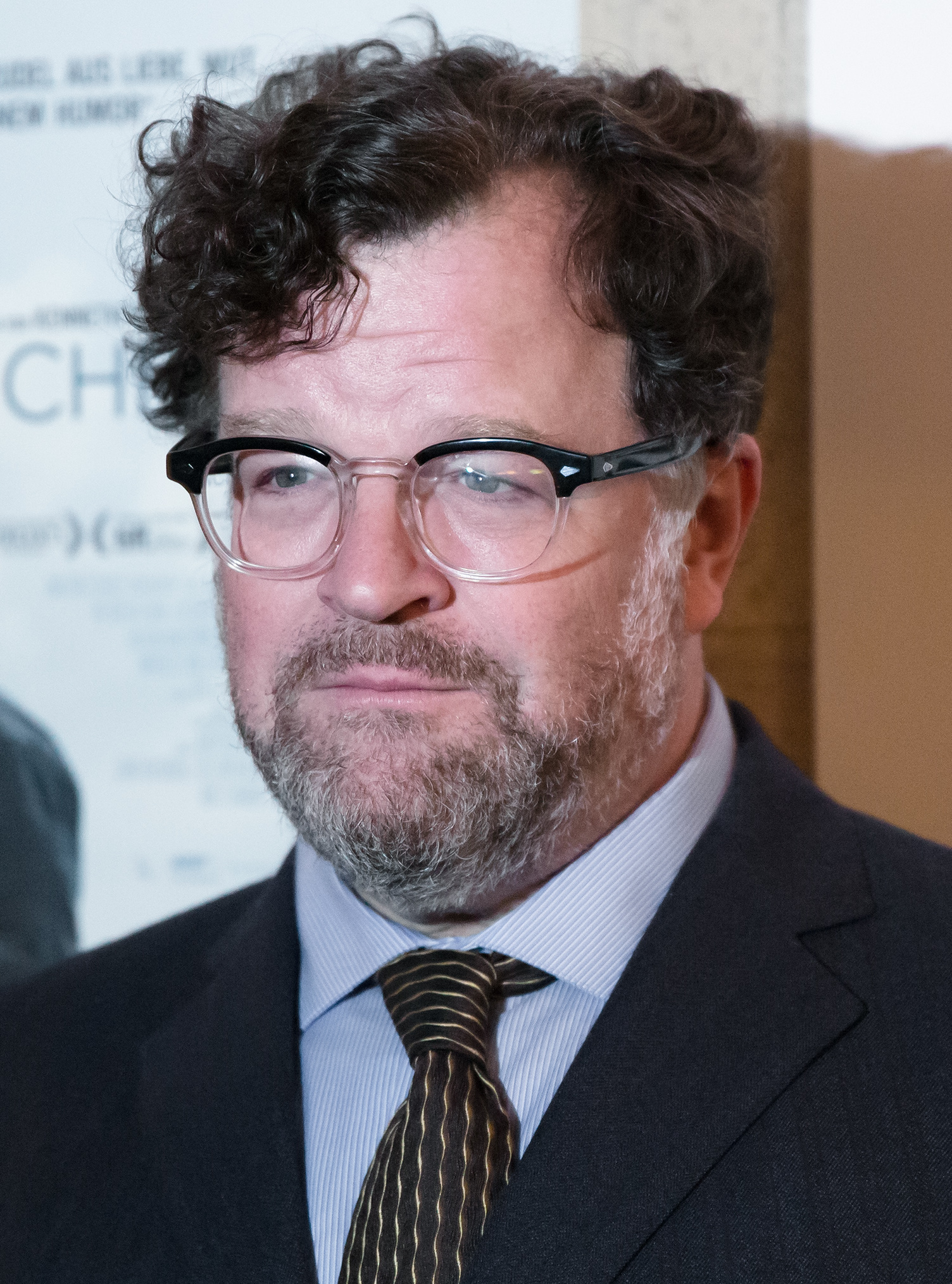
Kenneth Lonergan, Best Director and Best Screenplay winner

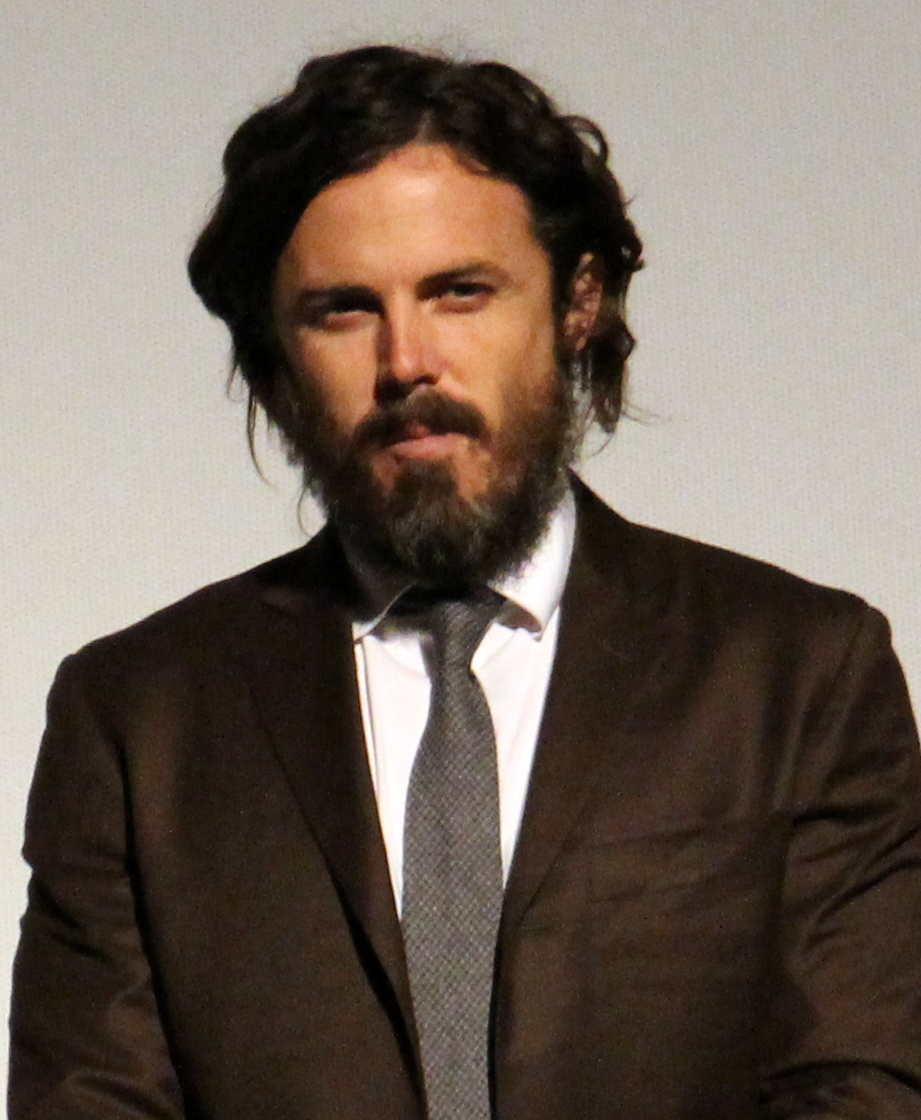
Casey Affleck, Best Actor winner

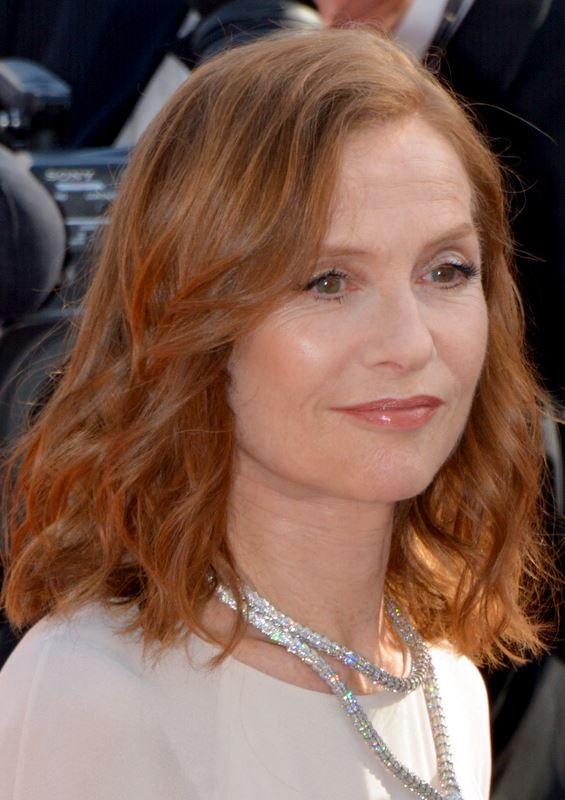
Isabelle Huppert, Best Actress winner

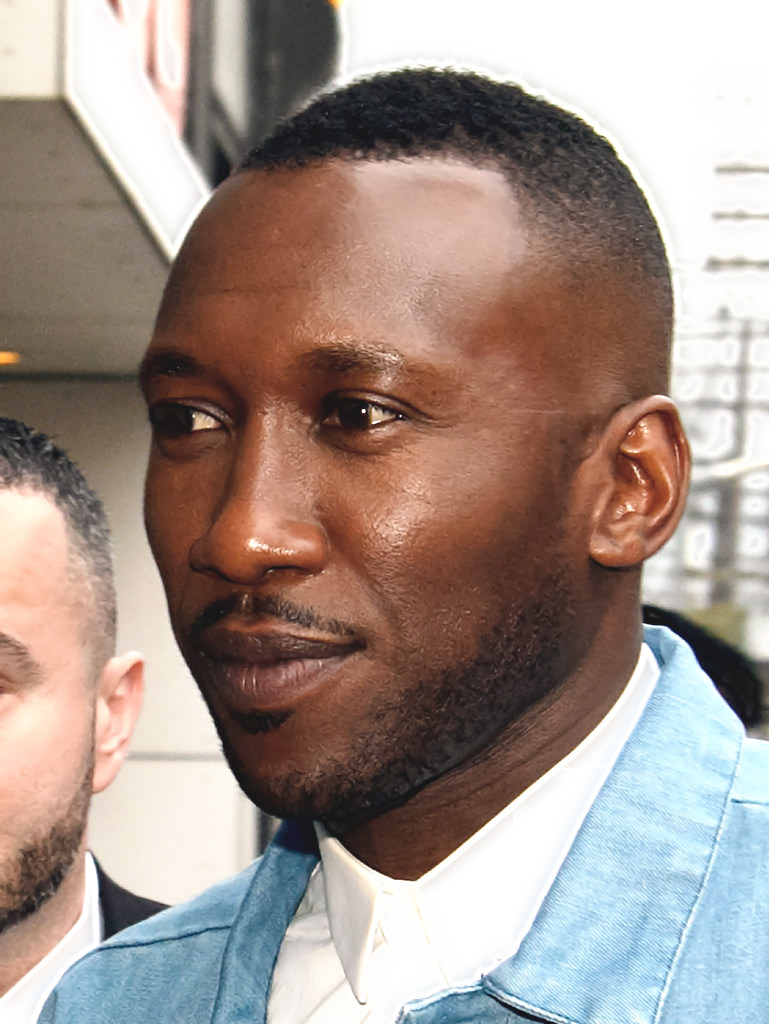
Mahershala Ali, Best Supporting Actor winner

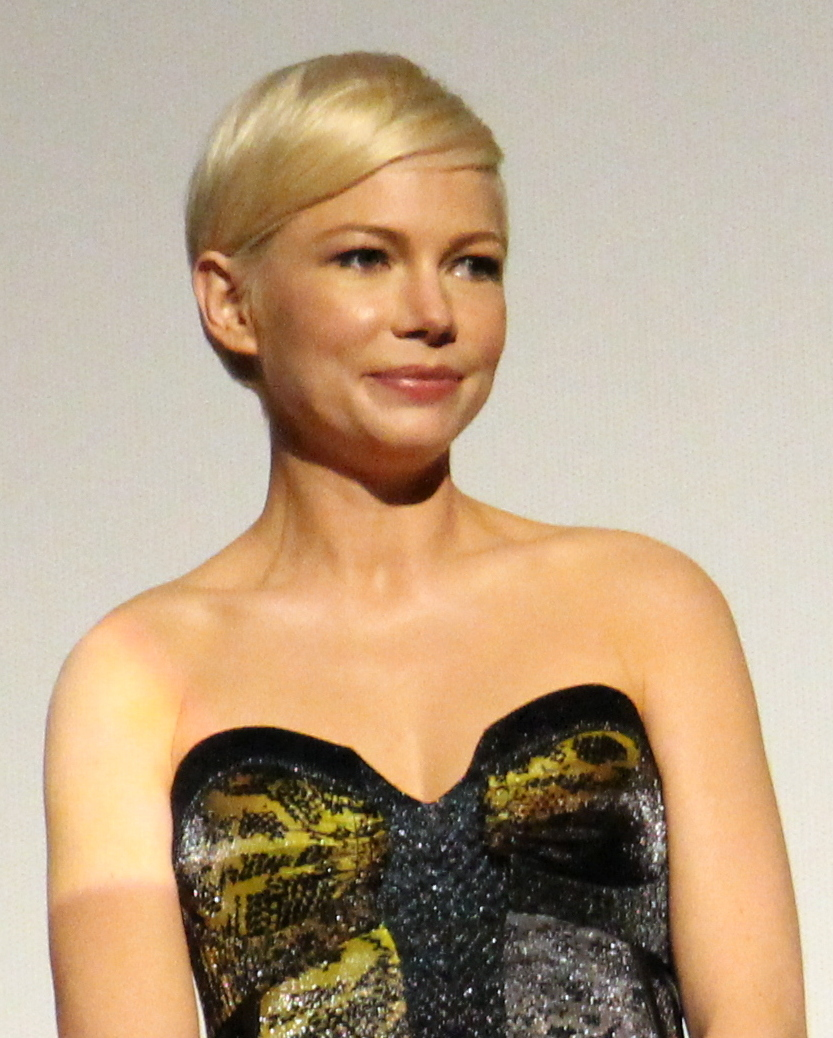
Michelle Williams, Best Supporting Actress winner

=== International ===
Best Film

- Manchester by the Sea
- La La Land
- Moonlight

Best Director

- Kenneth Lonergan – Manchester by the Sea
- Damien Chazelle – La La Land
- Denis Villeneuve – Arrival

Best Actor

- Casey Affleck – Manchester by the Sea
- Ryan Gosling – La La Land
- Denzel Washington – Fences

Best Actress

- Isabelle Huppert – Elle
- Amy Adams – Arrival
- Natalie Portman – Jackie

Best Supporting Actor

- Mahershala Ali – Moonlight
- Jeff Bridges – Hell or High Water
- Lucas Hedges – Manchester by the Sea

Best Supporting Actress

- Michelle Williams – Manchester by the Sea
- Viola Davis – Fences
- Naomie Harris – Moonlight

Best Screenplay

- Kenneth Lonergan – Manchester by the Sea
- Barry Jenkins – Moonlight
- Taylor Sheridan – Hell or High Water

Best Foreign-Language Film

- Toni Erdmann
- Elle
- The Handmaiden

Best Documentary

- Cameraperson
- 13th
- O.J.: Made in America

=== Canadian ===
Best Canadian Film

- Hello Destroyer
- Werewolf
- Window Horses

Best Director of a Canadian Film

- Kevan Funk – Hello Destroyer
- Ashley McKenzie – Werewolf
- Isiah Medina – 88:88

Best Actor in a Canadian Film

- Jared Abrahamson – Hello Destroyer
- Chen Gang – Old Stone
- Andrew Gillis – Werewolf

Best Actress in a Canadian Film

- Bhreagh MacNeil – Werewolf
- Deragh Campbell – Never Eat Alone
- Tatiana Maslany – The Other Half

Best Supporting Actor in a Canadian Film

- Kurt Max Runte – Hello Destroyer
- Joe Buffalo – Hello Destroyer
- Martin Dubreuil – Shambles (Maudite poutine)

Best Supporting Actress in a Canadian Film

- Molly Parker – Weirdos
- Hannah Gross – Unless
- Julia Sarah Stone – The Unseen

Best Screenplay of a Canadian Film

- Ann Marie Fleming – Window Horses
- Kevan Funk – Hello Destroyer
- Ashley McKenzie – Werewolf

Best Canadian Documentary

- The Prison in Twelve Landscapes
- After the Last River
- We Can't Make the Same Mistake Twice

Best First Film by a Canadian Director

- Werewolf
- Hello Destroyer
- Never Eat Alone

Best British Columbia Film

- Hello Destroyer
- Aim for the Roses
- Koneline: Our Land Beautiful
- Window Horses
