= Unclaimed =

Unclaimed may refer to:

- Unclaimed (2013 film), a documentary
- Unclaimed (2016 film), a TV film
- The Unclaimed, a project under which a 1967 single was released by Milan the Leather Boy
- Lost, mislaid, and abandoned property, also known as unclaimed property
- Terra nullius, also known as unclaimed territory
