= Vancouver Film Critics Circle Award for Best Supporting Actor in a Canadian Film =

Canadian film award

The Vancouver Film Critics Circle Award for Best Supporting Actor in a Canadian Film is an annual award given by the Vancouver Film Critics Circle.

== Winners ==
=== 2000s ===
| Year | Actor | Film | Role | Reference |
|---|---|---|---|---|
| 2002 | Benjamin Ratner | Looking for Leonard | Ted | |
| 2002 | Bruce Greenwood | Ararat | Martin Harcourt | |
| 2002 | Elias Koteas | Ararat | Ali | |
| 2003 | JR Bourne | On the Corner | Cliffie | |
| 2003 | Mark McKinney | Falling Angels | Reg/Ron | |
| 2003 | Stéphane Rousseau | The Barbarian Invasions (Les Invasions barbares) | Sébastien | |
| 2004 | Dave Foley | Childstar | Philip Templeman | |
| 2004 | Bruce Greenwood | Being Julia | Lord Charles | |
| 2004 | Mark Rendall | Childstar | Taylor Brandon Burns | |
| 2005 | Michel Côté | C.R.A.Z.Y. | Gervais Beaulieu | |
| 2006 | JR Bourne | Everything's Gone Green | Bryce | |
| 2006 | Henry Czerny | Fido | Jonathan Bottoms | |
| 2006 | Tim Blake Nelson | Fido | Mr. Theopolis | |
| 2006 | Benjamin Ratner | Mount Pleasant | Doug Cameron | |
| 2007 | Greg Bryk | Poor Boy's Game | Keith Rose | |
| 2007 | Danny Glover | Poor Boy's Game | George Carvery | |
| 2007 | Rade Šerbedžija | Fugitive Pieces | Athos Roussos | |
| 2008 | Randy Quaid | Real Time | Reuben | |
| 2008 | Gael García Bernal | Blindness | Bartender | |
| 2008 | Mark Ruffalo | Blindness | Doctor | |
| 2009 | François Arnaud | I Killed My Mother (J’ai tué ma mère) | Antonin Rimbaud | |
| 2009 | Daniel J. Gordon | Nurse.Fighter.Boy | Ciel | |
| 2009 | John Paul Tremblay | Trailer Park Boys: Countdown to Liquor Day | Julian | |

=== 2010s ===
| Year | Actor | Film | Role | Reference |
|---|---|---|---|---|
| 2010 | Dustin Hoffman | Barney's Version | Izzy Panofsky | |
| 2010 | Jay Brazeau | Fathers & Sons | Anton | |
| 2010 | Maxim Gaudette | Incendies | Simon Marwan | |
| 2011 | Viggo Mortensen | A Dangerous Method | Sigmund Freud | |
| 2011 | Vincent Cassel | A Dangerous Method | Otto Gross | |
| 2011 | Seth Rogen | Take This Waltz | Lou Rubin | |
| 2012 | Serge Kanyinda | War Witch (Rebelle) | Magicien | |
| 2012 | Jay Baruchel | Goon | Pat | |
| 2012 | Liev Schreiber | Goon | Ross "the Boss" Rhea | |
| 2013 | Alexandre Landry | Gabrielle | Martin | |
| 2013 | Marc Labrèche | Whitewash | Paul | |
| 2013 | Owen Williams | The Dirties | Owen | |
| 2014 | Marc-André Grondin | You're Sleeping Nicole (Tu dors Nicole) | Rémi Gagnon | |
| 2014 | Bruce Greenwood | Elephant Song | Dr. Greene | |
| 2014 | Callum Keith Rennie | Sitting on the Edge of Marlene | Fast Freddy | |
| 2015 | Nick Serino | Sleeping Giant | Nate | |
| 2015 | Patrick Huard | My Internship in Canada (Guibord s'en va-t-en guerre) | Steve Guibord | |
| 2015 | Reece Moffett | Sleeping Giant | Riley | |
| 2016 | Kurt Max Runte | Hello Destroyer | Dale Milbury | |
| 2016 | Joe Buffalo | Hello Destroyer | Eric | |
| 2016 | Martin Dubreuil | Shambles (Maudite poutine) | Michel | |
| 2017 | Ben Cotton | Gregoire | Steve | |
| 2017 | Joe Buffalo | Luk'Luk'I | Mark | |
| 2017 | Nathan Roder | Fail to Appear | Eric | |
| 2018 | Aaron Read | When the Storm Fades | Trevor | |
| 2018 | Pierre-Luc Brillant | The Fireflies Are Gone (La disparition des lucioles) | Steve | |
| 2018 | Willy Russ | Edge of the Knife | Kwa | |
| 2019 | Matt Johnson | Anne at 13,000 Ft. | Matt | |
| 2019 | David Cronenberg | Disappearance at Clifton Hill | Walter | |
| 2019 | Louis Negin | The Twentieth Century | Mother | |

=== 2020s ===
| Year | Actor | Film | Role | Ref. |
|---|---|---|---|---|
| 2020 | Christopher Abbott | Possessor | Colin Tate | |
| 2020 | Adam Beach | Monkey Beach | Uncle Mick | |
| 2020 | Adrian Holmes | Chained | Pete | |
| 2020 | Aleks Paunovic | Chained | Jim | |
| 2021 | Joshua Odjick | Wildhood | Pasmay | |
| 2021 | Eric McCormack | Drinkwater | Hank Drinkwater | |
| 2021 | Alex Tarrant | Night Raiders | Leo | |
| 2022 | Percy Hynes White | I Like Movies | Matt Macarchuck | |
| 2022 | Dohyun Noel Hwang | Riceboy Sleeps | Young Dong-Hyun | |
| 2022 | Aaron Pierre | Brother | Francis | |
| 2023 | Glenn Howerton | BlackBerry | Jim Balsillie | |
| 2023 | Jonas Chernick | The Burning Season | J.B. | |
| 2023 | Matt Johnson | BlackBerry | Douglas Fregin | |
| 2023 | Chris Pang | Seagrass | Pat | |
| 2024 | Patrick J. Adams | Young Werther | Albert | |
| 2024 | Kataem O'Connor | 40 Acres | Emanuel Freeman | |
| 2024 | Percy Hynes White | My Old Ass | Chad | |
| 2025 | Devon Bostick | Mile End Kicks | Archi | |
| 2025 | Jay McCarrol | Nirvanna the Band the Show the Movie | Jay | |
| 2025 | Stanley Simons | Mile End Kicks | Chevy | |
