= The Four Soldiers =

- French: Les 4 soldats
- Directed by: Robert Morin
- Written by: Robert Morin
- Based on: Quatre soldats by Hubert Mingarelli
- Produced by: Stéphanie Morissette
- Starring: Camille Mongeau; Christian de la Cortina; Antoine Bertrand; Aliocha Schneider; Antoine L'Écuyer
- Cinematography: Jean-Pierre St-Louis
- Edited by: Nicolas Roy
- Music by: Patrick Watson
- Production company: Coop Vidéo de Montréal
- Distributed by: Métropole Films
- Release dates: August 5, 2013 (Fantasia); August 16, 2013 (Quebec)
- Running time: 83 minutes
- Country: Canada
- Language: French
- Budget: C$2.9 million

The Four Soldiers (French: Les 4 soldats) is a 2013 Canadian drama film written and directed by Robert Morin, and adapted from Hubert Mingarelli’s novel Quatre soldats. Set during a future civil war in Quebec, the film stars Camille Mongeau, Christian de la Cortina, Antoine Bertrand and Aliocha Schneider. It premiered at the 2013 Fantasia Film Festival, where it won the Prix du public for Best Canadian Film.

== Synopsis ==
In a future Quebec marked by civil war, the wealthy are supported by the army while the poor fight in militias. Dominique, Matéo, Big Max and Kevin are four young soldiers in one such group. While stationed in the countryside, they form a makeshift family and discover a secluded pond that becomes a refuge from the war. Their fragile escape is unsettled when they are ordered to take the young Gabriel into their care.

== Cast ==
The cast includes:

- Camille Mongeau as Dominique
- Christian de la Cortina as Matéo
- Antoine Bertrand as Big Max
- Aliocha Schneider as Kevin
- Antoine L'Écuyer as Gabriel
- Gaston Caron as Corporal Guénette
- Rémy Ouellet as Lieutenant Larivière
- Jean-Pierre Bergeron as Commander Lacoste

== Production ==
The film was directed and written by Robert Morin, based on the novel Quatre soldats by Hubert Mingarelli. Filming took place on Montreal’s South Shore in August 2012. The film had an approximate budget of C$2.9 million.

== Release ==
The film premiered at the Fantasia Film Festival on August 5, 2013, before going into theatrical release in Quebec on August 16, 2013.

== Reception ==
=== Critical response ===
The Hollywood Reporter described the film as a "quiet, introspective picture" that played less like a war film than "a dreamy cousin" to science-fiction apocalypse films. The review wrote that the film was less effective in depicting the collapse of the soldiers' refuge.

=== Awards and nominations ===
At the 2013 Fantasia International Film Festival, the film won the Prix du public for Best Canadian Film. The film received two nominations at the 16th Jutra Awards in 2014, for Best Makeup for Kathryn Casault and Best Hairstyling for Denis Parent.

== Festival screenings ==
The film was later screened at the 2013 Cinéfest Sudbury International Film Festival, the 2013 Festival international du cinéma francophone en Acadie, the 2013 Cinéma du Québec à Paris, the 2014 Rendez-vous du cinéma québécois, and the 2014 Beijing International Film Festival.
