= Ningen =

Ningen (Japanese: 人間) is "human being" in Japanese language. Ningen may refer to:

- Ningen (1962 film), a Japanese drama film
- Ningen (2013 film), a Japanese-Turkish drama film
- Ningen (folklore), a gigantic humanoid whale-like creature from modern Japanese folklore

== See also ==
- Ningen Isu, a Japanese heavy metal band
