= Joe Buffalo =

Canadian skateboarder (born 1976)

Joe Buffalo (born 1976) is a Cree skateboarder and actor from Canada. He is most noted as a two-time Vancouver Film Critics Circle nominee for Best Supporting Actor in a Canadian Film, receiving nominations at the Vancouver Film Critics Circle Awards 2016 for Hello Destroyer and at the Vancouver Film Critics Circle Awards 2017 for Luk'Luk'I. He is a 2023 recipient of the Inspire Award in the sports category.

== Biography ==
A member of the Samson Cree Nation in Alberta, he is the great-grandson of Joe Buffalo, a former deputy chief who had an acting role in the 1958 film The Sheriff of Fractured Jaw, and the great-grand nephew of actor Gordon Tootoosis. A survivor of the Indian residential school system, he moved to Ottawa after school to begin his skateboarding career, although he struggled with substance abuse issues in his early years. Since getting sober, he has also served as an advocate and speaker on indigenous mental health. He received the Inspire Award, in the sports category in 2023.

He is associated with the indigenous-owned skateboard company Colonialism Skateboards, which released a professional model in 2021 that features Buffalo's student identification card from the Qu'Appelle Indian Residential School printed on the top.

As an actor, he has also had supporting roles in the films The Fish and the Sea, Cake Day and Brother, I Cry.

He is the subject of Amar Chebib's 2021 short documentary film Joe Buffalo.
