= Bison (2014 film) =

- Directed by: Kevan Funk
- Written by: Kevan Funk
- Produced by: Kevan Funk
- Starring: Dylan Playfair; Tyler Burrows; James Michel; Kurt Max Runte; Kody Abrahamson; Derek Abrahamson
- Cinematography: Benjamin Loeb
- Edited by: Kevan Funk
- Release date: September 2014 (TIFF)
- Running time: 12 minutes
- Country: Canada
- Language: English

Bison is a Canadian short film, directed by Kevan Funk and released in 2014. A critique of colonialism, the film stars Dylan Playfair as a young man who makes an unsettling discovery while helping to brand cattle on a ranch.

The cast also includes Tyler Burrows, James Michel, Kody Abrahamson, Derek Abrahamson and Kurt Max Runte.

The film premiered at the 2014 Toronto International Film Festival. It was later named to TIFF's annual year-end Canada's Top Ten list of the year's best Canadian short films.
