= Qissa (film) =

2013 film

- Film Poster
- Directed by: Anup Singh
- Written by: Anup Singh; Madhuja Mukherjee
- Produced by: Johannes Rexin; Bettina Brokemper
- Starring: Irrfan Khan; Tillotama Shome; Tisca Chopra
- Cinematography: Sebastian Edschmid
- Edited by: Bernd Euscher
- Music by: Beatrice Thiriet; Manish J Tipu
- Release dates: 8 September 2013 (TIFF); 10 July 2014 (Germany); 20 February 2015 (India)
- Running time: 110 minutes
- Countries: India; Germany; France; Netherlands
- Language: Punjabi

Qissa is a 2013 Indian-German drama film written and directed by Anup Singh. The Punjabi-language film was released in Indian theaters on 20 February 2015 nationwide and simultaneously on DVD and VOD as well. The film was screened in the Contemporary World Cinema section at the 2013 Toronto International Film Festival where it won the Netpac Award for World or International Asian Film. The theme of the film focuses on desire of a Sikh man towards having a son to continue the family lineage.

== Plot ==
During the Partition of India in 1947, a Sikh Punjabi named Umber Singh evacuates his house with his wife Mehar and three daughters. He is disgruntled at the fact that he does not have a son to carry on his family lineage which is assumed to be carried forward by the men of the next generation. He tells his wife that he is confident the next child will be a boy, but Mehar is unsure and fearful that if she has another girl, Umber will leave her. During the birth of their fourth child, Umber takes the child from the womb and declares with happiness that it is a boy. Mehar checks the gender of the child and realizes the child is in fact a girl. Umber is declaring the child to be a boy because of his strong desire to have a son. She tells Umber that it is better to kill the girl child than enforcing his desire for a son on the child. Umber ignores her and happily, in his own denial, declares the new child a boy named Kanwar Singh.

Umber fosters Kanwar as a son and wants her to gain strength, endurance and the ability to shoot a gun like a son. Kanwar has lapses of normal behavior for a girl, including crying, giggling and having her first period, which her father tries hard to repress and ignore. One time, when Kanwar goes out to play with her sisters, they end up fighting and Kanwar falls to the ground and breaks her leg. Once home and given proper medical treatment, Umber is blindingly furious at his three daughters for hurting his only "son". He drags his daughters off the bed and starts beating them mercilessly, but his wife Mehar comes in to stop him and tells him to get out. Umber declares if anything happens to his "son", he will cut his daughters to pieces.

Once Kanwar becomes a fully functioning "man", after having her turban ceremony, she starts to converse with a girl named Neeli, who is the daughter of one of Umber's close friends. Kanwar and Neeli tease each other and kid around over the course of several weeks. In one instance, they fool around near the woods, where Kanwar tries to lock Neeli in a shed. She escapes and they both wrestle each other. Umber oversees this and sees his "son"'s happiness and asks Neeli's father for Neeli's hand in marriage to marry Kanwar. Soon, after the wedding ceremony, Neeli learns that Kanwar does not have a penis, though she doesn't know that he is actually a girl. Umber tells her that Kanwar had an 'accident' when he was younger. Neeli is disheartened knowing that she will never be able to have children with Kanwar. During one night, Neeli packs her bags and tries to escape her marriage. Umber spots her and pleads for her to come back. When she refuses, Umber wrestles her to the ground and attempts to rape her. Kanwar hears the commotion and comes outside to see her father trying to rape Neeli. Kanwar cries, trying to stop her father, but Umber tells her "it is the only way to have a son in the family". Umber promises Kanwar that if he leaves and lets Umber rape Neeli, they will have a son. Kanwar leaves in a fit of rage, but comes back carrying a shotgun, which he uses to shoot Umber in the back, killing him.

After the funeral of Umber, Mehar forces Kanwar and Neeli to run away and start a new life together in her father's abandoned house and never to come back. Neeli and Kanwar profess their affection and accept the love they have towards each other, but hiding Kanwar's gender from all others. As they continue to live together as women, Neeli helps Kanwar shed the manhood her father forced on her and embrace the fact that she is biologically a woman.

After some time, Kanwar decides to go and bring her mother to their new home. When she arrives, she sees that their house has been burned down and her mother and two sisters have died in the fire. The only person left is her eldest sister, Baali, who has gone mentally insane and talks about "making Umber's dinner and cleaning Umber's room". As Kanwar explores the house, she sees her father's spirit in the mirror. The unsatisfied spirit of Umber continues to haunt Kanwar all the way back home. Umber tells Kanwar that they must make things right. Kanwar is haunted in her dreams by Umber and on Lohri night, Kanwar yells out the window to her father that she wants to pretend to be a man as per his desire but her womanhood is beyond her control now and she is failing to control that. Kanwar strips naked and professes her womanhood. The town's people hear this and are extremely disproving. They attempt to break into the house. Neeli tells Kanwar to go and not to come back otherwise they will both get killed. Kanwar leaves again and as she wanders through the desert she sees her father. Broken and at her wits end, Kanwar submits to her father's spirit who drowns her in an oasis. Umber goes to the village to call Neeli, where he masquerades as being Kanwar and removes his shirt off in front of the disputing villagers (to evince his masculinity); and later brings Neeli to the burned down house in which Kanwar's family used to live. He tells her that he will start the life once again and build everything afresh just like he did when he migrated from Pakistan. Neeli commits suicide by falling off the top balcony, leaving Umber by himself, wandering as a lost soul with his unfulfilled desire to have a son to carry his family lineage.

== Cast ==
- Irrfan Khan as Umber Singh
- Tillotama Shome as Kanwar Singh
- Rasika Dugal as Neeli
- Tisca Chopra as Mehar, Umber's wife
- Faezeh Jalali as Baali
- Sonia Bindra

== Reception ==
The film received positive reviews from film critics as well as audience. It received a 7.3 out of 10 rating based on 16 reviews on ReviewMonk, an Indian film review aggregating site (similar to MetaCritic). The critics consensus was "A masterpiece that lovers of parallel cinema would thoroughly enjoy. This unconventional and heart-breaking folk tale captures human emotions unlike any other recent Indian film."
