= The Fish and the Sea =

2018 film

- Film poster
- Directed by: Phillip Thomas
- Written by: Phillip Thomas
- Produced by: Spencer Foley; Phillip Thomas
- Starring: Maxwell Haynes; Sara Canning; Kurt Max Runte
- Cinematography: Liam Mitchell
- Edited by: Phillip Thomas
- Music by: Jeremy Wallace Maclean
- Release date: 2018
- Running time: 20 minutes
- Country: Canada
- Language: English

The Fish and the Sea is a Canadian short drama film, directed by Phillip Thomas and released in 2018. The film stars Maxwell Haynes as a young man living an isolated existence in an abandoned house, whose life is disrupted when a real estate agent (Sara Canning) arrives to show the house to a potential buyer (Kurt Max Runte).

At the 7th Canadian Screen Awards in 2019, the film was shortlisted for Best Live Action Short Drama.
