= The Immoral =

2013 film

- Directed by: Lars Daniel Krutzkoff Jacobsen
- Produced by: Anders Tangen
- Starring: Daniel Gjerde
- Cinematography: Jørgen Klüver
- Release date: 9 September 2013 (TIFF)
- Running time: 87 minutes
- Country: Norway
- Language: Norwegian

The Immoral (Norwegian: De Umoralske) is a 2013 Norwegian comedy film directed by Lars Daniel Krutzkoff Jacobsen. It was screened in the Contemporary World Cinema section at the 2013 Toronto International Film Festival.

== Cast ==
- Daniel Gjerde
- Hanne Bach Hansen
- Kjetil Krogstad Skrede
