= Jared Abrahamson =

Canadian actor

Jared Abrahamson (born November 19, 1987) is a Canadian actor. He is known for his performance in the 2016 film Hello Destroyer, for which he was nominated for a Canadian Screen Award for Best Actor and won the award for Best Actor in a Canadian Film at the Vancouver Film Critics Circle Awards 2016, and for portraying Trevor Holden in the sci-fi series Travelers.

== Early life and education ==
Jared Abrahamson is originally from Flin Flon, Manitoba, Canada, a mining town of 5,500. Abrahamson spent two years working underground there as a miner before studying acting at the Vancouver Film School.

== Career ==
Abrahamson is known for his performance in the 2016 film Hello Destroyer, for which he was nominated for a Canadian Screen Award for Best Actor and won the award for Best Actor in a Canadian Film at the Vancouver Film Critics Circle Awards 2016.

He portrayed Trevor Holden in the Showcase and Netflix series Travelers.

He was named one of the Toronto International Film Festival's Rising Stars of 2016, alongside Grace Glowicki, Mylène Mackay and Sophie Nélisse.

Abrahamson has also appeared in the television series Awkward and Fear the Walking Dead, Letterkenny, and the films The Submarine Kid and Never Steady, Never Still.

== Filmography ==
=== Films ===
Year	Title	Role	Notes
2012	Diary of a Wimpy Kid: Dog Days	Tim Warren	
2015	The Submarine Kid	Cooper Koll	
2016	Blowtorch	Dave Willis	
2016	Detour	Paul	
2016	Hello Destroyer	Tyson Burr	
2016	Texas Heart	Roy	
2017	Be Afraid	Ben Chambers	
2017	Break Night	Jimmy	
2017	Gregoire	Felix	
2017	Gun	Tommy	
2017	Hollow in the Land	Brandon Miller	
2017	Keep Watching	Josh Canfield	
2017	Never Steady, Never Still	Daryl	
2017	Sweet Virginia	Paul Anderson	
2018	American Animals	Eric Borsuk	
2020	The Curse of Audrey Earnshaw	Colm Dwyer	
2021	Like a House on Fire	Danny	
2021	On the Count of Three	Wyatt	
2022	God's Time	Russel	
2023	Bad Things	Brian	
2024	Asleep in My Palm	José	
2024	Venom: The Last Dance	Captain Forrest	
2024	Relay	Ryan	

=== Television ===
Year	Title	Role	Notes
2011	Finding a Family	Alex Chivescu	Television film
2011	Possessing Piper Rose	Dylan Maxwell	Television film
2012	The Manzanis	Mikey	Television film
2012	Seattle Superstorm	Wyatt Foster	Television film
2014–2015	Awkward	Pete	5 episodes
2015	Fear the Walking Dead	CPL Cole	2 episodes
2016–2018	Travelers	Trevor Holden	Main role
2019	Letterkenny	Jake	Guest
2020	Ramy	Dennis	2 episodes
2023	The Changeling	Brian West	Main role
2024	The Penguin	Squid	Recurring

== Awards and nominations ==
Year	Award	Category	Nominated work	Result	Ref.
2014	Leo Awards	Best Performance by a Male in a Short Drama	Destroyer	Nominated	
2016	Vancouver Film Critics Circle Awards	Best Actor in a Canadian Film	Hello Destroyer	Won	
2017	Canadian Screen Awards	Best Performance by an Actor in a Leading Role	Hello Destroyer	Nominated	
2017	Leo Awards	Best Lead Performance by a Male in a Motion Picture	Hello Destroyer	Won	
2017	Vancouver Film Critics Circle Awards	Best Actor in a Canadian Film	Gregoire	Nominated	
2018	Leo Awards	Best Lead Performance by a Male in a Motion Picture	Gregoire	Nominated	
2019	Leo Awards	Best Supporting Performance by a Male in a Motion Picture	American Animals	Nominated	
