= Ekti Nadir Naam =

- Film poster
- Directed by: Anup Singh
- Produced by: NFDC, British Film Institute, Aashirbad Chalachitra, Bangladesh, The Ministry of External Affairs, India, Riverfilms
- Starring: Shiboprosad Mukherjee; Shomi Kaiser; Supriya Devi; Abhanish Bandopadhyay
- Cinematography: K. K. Mahajan
- Edited by: Arghyakamal Mitra
- Distributed by: British Film Institute
- Release date: 28 June 2003
- Running time: 1:27:34
- Countries: India, UK, Bangladesh
- Language: Bengali

Ekti Nadir Naam (English: The Name of a River) is a 2003 documentary-style film directed by Anup Singh, exploring the life and work of the great Indian filmmaker Ritwik Ghatak and is set in the partition of Bengal in 1947.

The film won the Silver Dhow Prize at the 5th Zanzibar International Film Festival.

== Overview ==
The Name of a River is Anup Singh's debut work and focuses on a love story between a man and a woman crossing the river between Bangladesh and India - playing the roles of refugees, divine beings and literary and cinematic characters - to understand the mysteries of the events that led to the massacre of half a million people and forced ten million people to migrate across the newly established borders. Covering a huge area of visual, aural and intellectual ground within its 90 minutes, this exquisite film presents its audience with a dreamlike odyssey through a history, a life and a work that we, the viewers, encounter in the shape of stunning landscapes and music, lovers and gods, myths and memories, literature and cinema.

=== Filming ===
The film was shot in India and Bangladesh.

== Credits ==
=== Cast ===
- Shibu Prasad Mukhopadhyay
- Shomi Kaiser
- Supriya Choudhury
- Abhanish Bandopadhyay
- Rosy Afsari
- Kabori Sarwar
- Gita Dey
- Gita Ghatak
- Baisakhi Marjit
- Pratithi Debi
- Meem
- Adrita
- Rousan Zamil
- Tondra Islam
- Tamizuddin Rezvi
- Kalipod Sen

=== Crew ===
- Director: Anup Singh
- Screenplay: Madan Gopal Singh and Anup Singh
- Original Music: Sanjoy Chowdhury
- Cinematography: K.K. Mahajan and Prasann Jain
- Editor: Arghya Kamal Mitra
- Sound Designer: Nihar Samal
- Art Director: Chokas Bharadwaj
- Costume: Madhuja Mukhopadhyay
- Line Producer: Mita Vasisht
- Executive Producers: Steve Brookes, P. Parameswaran and Akhand, Sanwar Murshed.
- Producer: NFDC, British Film Institute, Aashirbad Chalachitra, Bangladesh, The Ministry of External Affairs, India and Riverfilms.
- Distributor: British Film Institute
