= Evergreen$ =

- French: Sapin$
- Directed by: Stéphane Moukarzel
- Written by: Germain Larochelle; Stéphane Moukarzel
- Produced by: Ziad Touma
- Starring: Étienne Galloy; Diane Rouxel
- Cinematography: Alexandre Lampron
- Edited by: Philippe Melançon
- Music by: Peter Venne
- Production company: Couzin Films
- Distributed by: Maison 4:3
- Release date: December 22, 2023
- Running time: 111 minutes
- Country: Canada
- Languages: French; English; Spanish

Evergreen$ (French: Sapin$) is a Canadian Christmas comedy film, directed by Stéphane Moukarzel and released in 2023. The film stars Étienne Galloy as Rémi, an immature young man whose reputation in his community is destroyed when he gets into a car accident while jokingly dressed as a terrorist; with few options to support himself, he goes to New York City, where he takes a job selling Christmas trees, befriends French activist Laura (Diane Rouxel), and learns the importance of community when he becomes drawn into Laura's campaign to protect the multicultural neighbourhood from gentrification.

The cast also includes Tyrone Benskin, Thy Sros, Don Jordan, Stuart Fink, Conrad Pla, Milya Corbeil Gauvreau, Danny Blanco Hall, Mimo Magri, Rémi Goulet, Pilar Cazares, Azusa Oga, Keali Barker, Kenny Baye, Henry Beasley, Genti Bejko, Bobby Beshro and Ryan Bommarito in supporting roles.

According to Moukarzel, the film was inspired in part by a conversation with cinematographer Alexandre Lampron about his own prior experience in a job selling Christmas trees.

The film opened theatrically on December 22, 2023.
