= The Free Ones =

2020 film by Nicolas Lévesque

- French: Les Libres
- Directed by: Nicolas Lévesque
- Written by: Nicolas Lévesque
- Produced by: Jean-Philippe Archibald
- Cinematography: Jean-Philippe Archibald
- Edited by: Natacha Dufaux
- Release date: November 12, 2020 (RIDM)
- Running time: 94 minutes
- Country: Canada
- Language: French

The Free Ones (French: Les Libres) is a Canadian documentary film, directed by Nicolas Lévesque and released in 2020. An expansion of his 2015 short film Interview with a Free Man (Entrevue avec un homme libre), which was named by the Toronto International Film Festival as one of the Canada's Top Ten short films in 2015, the film is a portrait of several ex-convicts who are readjusting to life as free men with jobs at a sawmill in Roberval, Quebec.

The film premiered at the 2020 Montreal International Documentary Festival.

The film received two Canadian Screen Award nominations at the 9th Canadian Screen Awards, for Best Cinematography in a Documentary (Jean-Philippe Archibald) and Best Editing in a Documentary (Natacha Dufaux).
