= Old Stone =

2016 film

- Film poster
- Lao Shi
- Directed by: Johnny Ma
- Written by: Johnny Ma
- Produced by: Wang Jing; Wu Xian Jian; Lin Chi-an; Sarah Stallard
- Starring: Chen Gang; Wang Hongwei
- Cinematography: Leung Ming Kai
- Edited by: Michael Long
- Music by: Lee Sanders
- Production company: Maktub Media Entertainment
- Release date: 12 February 2016 (Berlin)
- Running time: 80 minutes
- Countries: Canada; China
- Language: Mandarin

Old Stone (Chinese: 老石; pinyin: Lǎo Shí) is a 2016 Chinese-Canadian drama film directed by Johnny Ma. It was selected to be screened in the Discovery section at the 2016 Toronto International Film Festival.

The film tells the story of Lao Shi (Chen Gang), a cab driver in China whose life spirals out of control after he hits a motorcyclist, leaving him trapped in a bureaucratic nightmare because Chinese laws effectively criminalize such an accident far more harshly if the driver stops to help the victim than they do if he simply leaves the victim to die.

== Cast ==
- Chen Gang as Lao Shi
- An Nai as Mao Mao
- Wang Hongwei as Captain
- Zhang Zebin as Li Jiang
- Lou Xue'er as Xue'er

== Awards ==
The film was named the winner of TIFF's award for Best Canadian First Feature Film. On 7 December 2016, it was named to TIFF's annual Canada's Top 10 list.

The film garnered five Canadian Screen Award nominations at the 5th Canadian Screen Awards in 2017, for Best Picture, Best Actor (Chen), Best Original Screenplay (Ma), Best Cinematography (Leung Ming Kai) and Best Editing (Michael Long). It won the Canadian Screen Award for Best First Feature.
