= Time Flies (2013 film) =

- Film poster
- French: Nous avions
- Directed by: Stéphane Moukarzel
- Written by: Stéphane Moukarzel
- Produced by: Gabrielle Tougas-Fréchette
- Starring: Liridon Rashiti; Minoo Gundevia; Deena Aziz; Avinas Gnanapragasam; Michelle Michael; Naseem Siddiqi
- Cinematography: Vincent Biron
- Edited by: Véronique Barbe
- Release date: September 10, 2013 (TIFF)
- Running time: 19 minutes
- Country: Canada
- Languages: French; Urdu; English

Time Flies (French: Nous avions) is a Canadian short drama film, directed by Stéphane Moukarzel and released in 2013. Depicting a Pakistani Canadian immigrant family in Montreal, the film centres on teenage son Akram's (Liridon Rashiti) decision to run off to live his own life independently of his family's strict rules.

The film's cast also includes Minoo Gundevia, Deena Aziz, Avinas Gnanapragasam, Michelle Michael and Naseem Siddiqi.

The film premiered at the 2013 Toronto International Film Festival, and was named to TIFF's Canada's Top Ten list as one of the ten best Canadian short films of the year. It was a Canadian Screen Award nominee for Best Live Action Short Drama at the 2nd Canadian Screen Awards in 2014, and a Prix Jutra nominee for Best Short Film at the 16th Jutra Awards.
