= Yellowhead (film) =

- Directed by: Kevan Funk
- Written by: Kevan Funk
- Produced by: Kevan Funk
- Starring: Paul McGillion; Michael Kopsa; Kurt Max Runte
- Cinematography: Benjamin Loeb
- Edited by: Kevan Funk
- Production company: Everything All At Once
- Release date: September 2013 (TIFF)
- Running time: 19 minutes
- Country: Canada
- Language: English

Yellowhead is a Canadian short film, directed by Kevan Funk and released in 2013. The film stars Paul McGillion as an emotionally detached industrial safety inspector travelling to mining and natural resource sites along the Yellowhead Highway in rural Alberta and British Columbia while neglecting his own health.

The cast also includes Michael Kopsa and Kurt Max Runte.

The film premiered at the 2013 Toronto International Film Festival, where it received an honorable mention from the jury for the Best Canadian Short Film award. It was subsequently screened at the 2013 Calgary International Film Festival, where Funk won the Alberta Spirit Award.

It was later named to TIFF's annual year-end Canada's Top Ten list of the year's best Canadian short films.
