= Paradise Falls (film) =

2013 Canadian short film

- Directed by: Fantavious Fritz
- Written by: Fantavious Fritz
- Produced by: Ben Petrie; Murray Angotti
- Starring: Alex Crowther; Alistair Ball; Uri Livene-Bar; Daiva Zalnieriunas
- Cinematography: Kelly Jeffrey
- Edited by: Calum J. Moore
- Production company: Fritz Enterprises
- Release date: September 10, 2013 (TIFF)
- Running time: 17 minutes
- Country: Canada
- Language: English

Paradise Falls is a 2013 Canadian horror comedy short film, written and directed by Fantavious Fritz. Set in a mysterious neighbourhood that was abandoned after the revelation that it was built atop an ancient cemetery and was thus apparently cursed, the film centres on Sonny (Alistair Ball) and Dirk (Uri Livene-Bar), two young boys who decide to explore the developer's mansion and encounter the ghost of his dead daughter Eleanor (Daiva Zalnieriunas).

The film features narration by Alex Crowther.

It premiered at the 2013 Toronto International Film Festival.

The film was named to TIFF's year-end Canada's Top Ten list for short films in 2013.

The film was produced as thesis work at Toronto Metropolitan University's Image Arts: Film Studies program. The school’s film festival screened it in a retrospective of student work in 2025.
