= A Grand Canal =

2013 Canadian short film

- Film poster
- Directed by: Johnny Ma
- Written by: Jonny Ma
- Produced by: Jie Chen; Sarah Stallard
- Starring: Xiao Min Du; Zhan Mei; Mei Song Shun; Hong Sheng Wang; Yun Feng Wang
- Narrated by: Johnny Ma
- Cinematography: Wang Yifan
- Edited by: Mike Long
- Release date: September 2013 (TIFF)
- Running time: 20 minutes
- Country: Canada
- Language: Mandarin

A Grand Canal is a Canadian short drama film, directed by Johnny Ma and released in 2013. The film centres on a boat captain trying to collect a debt from the most powerful man in town, as retold by the captain's son as an adult.

The film's cast includes Xiao Min Du, Zhan Mei, Mei Song Shun, Hong Sheng Wang and Yun Feng Wang, as well as Ma himself as the narrator.

The film premiered at the 2013 Toronto International Film Festival. It was named to TIFF's Canada's Top Ten list as one of the ten best Canadian short films of the year, and was a Canadian Screen Award nominee for Best Live Action Short Drama at the 2nd Canadian Screen Awards in 2014.

== Cast ==
- Xiao Min Du
- Zhan Mei
- Mei Song Shun
- Hong Sheng Wang
- Yun Feng Wang
