= Subconscious Password =

- Directed by: Chris Landreth
- Written by: Chris Landreth
- Produced by: Marcy Page; Mark Smith
- Starring: Chris Landreth; John Dilworth; Don McKellar; Ron Pardo; Patrice Goodman; Ray Landry
- Music by: Daniel Janke
- Production company: National Film Board of Canada
- Release date: June 11, 2013 (Annecy FF)
- Running time: 11:15 minutes
- Country: Canada
- Language: English

Subconscious Password is a 2013 3-D animated film by Chris Landreth offering an imaginary, comedic look at the inner workings of Landreth's mind, as he tries to remember someone's name at a party.

The film was produced by the National Film Board of Canada (NFB) with the participation of Copperheart Entertainment and the Seneca College Animation Arts Centre.

== Synopsis ==
The film presents the mental process of remembering a friend's name as if it were an episode of a game show, with various celebrities attempting to assist Landreth.

== Production ==
The film is made with computer animation, as well as pixilation sequences at the beginning and end of the film, featuring animation director John R. Dilworth as the friend whose name Landreth cannot recall. Subconscious Password is Landreth's first 3-D film and third with the NFB, Copperheart Entertainment and Seneca College.

The idea for the film came to Landreth after watching a rerun of the game show Password in 2010.

More than fifteen Seneca College graduating students worked on Subconscious Password, supported by five faculty members, as part of the Seneca Summer Animation Institute. After graduation, a number of these students were hired to work on the project until it was completed in February 2013. Most of the film was produced at Seneca's Animation Arts Centre in Toronto, with three Seneca students also working on the film at the NFB's Animation Studio in Montreal. Subconscious Password was the first stereoscopic 3D film for Seneca College.

The images of celebrities used in the film were developed from a variety of sources, with Sammy Davis Jr. appearing via live-action footage available in the public domain and James Joyce derived from photos projected onto a pseudo-3D character. The computer animation was created with Autodesk Maya, with opening title sequences animated with SANDDE (Stereoscopic Animation Drawing Device), a digital animation technology created by IMAX that allows artists to create hand-drawn animation in 3D space, and which has been licensed to the NFB to develop creative applications.

Landreth has stated that the film begins "relatively flat", using more stereoscopic depth to immerse audiences as the film progresses.

== Release ==
Subconscious Password was named best short film at the 2013 Annecy International Animated Film Festival. The film had its Canadian premiere at the 2013 Toronto International Film Festival. In December 2013, the film was named to the Toronto International Film Festival's annual top ten list, in the short film category. On March 9, 2014, Subconscious Password was named best animated short at the Canadian Screen Awards.
