= Kurt Max Runte =

Canadian actor

- Education: University of Victoria
- Occupation: Actor

Kurt Max Runte is a Canadian actor, based in Vancouver, British Columbia.

He is noted for his performance as Dale Milbury in the 2016 film Hello Destroyer, for which he won the Vancouver Film Critics Circle Award for Best Supporting Actor in a Canadian Film at the Vancouver Film Critics Circle Awards 2016.

== Education and career ==
Originally from Wetaskiwin, Alberta, Runte began his acting career in Edmonton after graduating from the theatre program at the University of Victoria.

Primarily a stage actor, his roles have included productions of D.D. Kugler's The Monument for Northern Light Theatre, Brian Drader's The Fruit Machine for the Out West Performance Society, William Shakespeare's Hamlet and Alan Ayckbourn's Communicating Doors for the Stanley Theatre, François Archambault's The Winners for the Firehall Arts Centre, and Patrick Marber's Closer for Western Conspiracy Theatre. He was a Jessie Richardson Theatre Award nominee for Best Actor in 2000 for The Winners.

Runte has also had supporting roles in film and television, including in Kevan Funk's short films Yellowhead and Bison, and a recurring role as Jason Breen in Kyle XY.

He is a two-time Leo Award nominee for Best Supporting Actor in a Film, receiving nominations in 2003 for Little Brother of War and in 2017 for Hello Destroyer.

== Filmography ==
Year	Title	Role	Notes
2005	Elektra	Nikolas Natchios	
2003	X2	Chief of Staff Abrahams	
2007	Aliens vs. Predator: Requiem	Buddy Benson	
