= Asphalt Watches =

2013 film

- Directed by: Shayne Ehman; Seth Scriver
- Written by: Shayne Ehman; Seth Scriver
- Produced by: Shayne Ehman; Seth Scriver
- Production company: Delusional Brothers
- Release date: 10 September 2013 (TIFF)
- Running time: 94 minutes
- Country: Canada
- Language: English

Asphalt Watches is a 2013 Canadian animated film directed by Shayne Ehman and Seth Scriver. It was screened in the Vanguard section at the 2013 Toronto International Film Festival where it won the award for Best Canadian First Feature Film. Although highly surreal, the film's plot was based on a true story about a road trip across Canada that the directors took together in 2000.
