= The End of Pinky =

- French: La Fin de Pinky
- Directed by: Claire Blanchet
- Screenplay by: Claire Blanchet
- Based on: The End of Pinky by Heather O'Neill
- Produced by: Michael Fukushima
- Starring: Marc-André Grondin
- Music by: Geneviève Levasseur
- Production company: National Film Board of Canada
- Release date: September 11, 2013 (TIFF)
- Running time: 8 minutes
- Country: Canada
- Languages: English; French

The End of Pinky (French: La Fin de Pinky) is a 2013 Canadian stereoscopic National Film Board of Canada animated short directed by Claire Blanchet, based on a short story of the same name by Heather O'Neill. Described by the director as an "animated film noir set in a dream-like version of Montreal's Red Light District," the film is narrated in its English version by O'Neill and in French by Quebec actor Marc-André Grondin. Music for the film was composed by Genevieve Levasseur. O'Neill's story was originally published in the 2008 January–February edition of The Walrus. The film had its world premiere on September 11 in the Short Cuts Canada Programme of the 2013 Toronto International Film Festival.

In December 2013, The End of Pinky was named to the Toronto International Film Festival's annual Canada's Top Ten list, in the short film category. The film was a Canadian Screen Award nominee for Best Animated Short at the 2nd Canadian Screen Awards in 2014.
