= Johnny Ma =

Chinese-Canadian film director

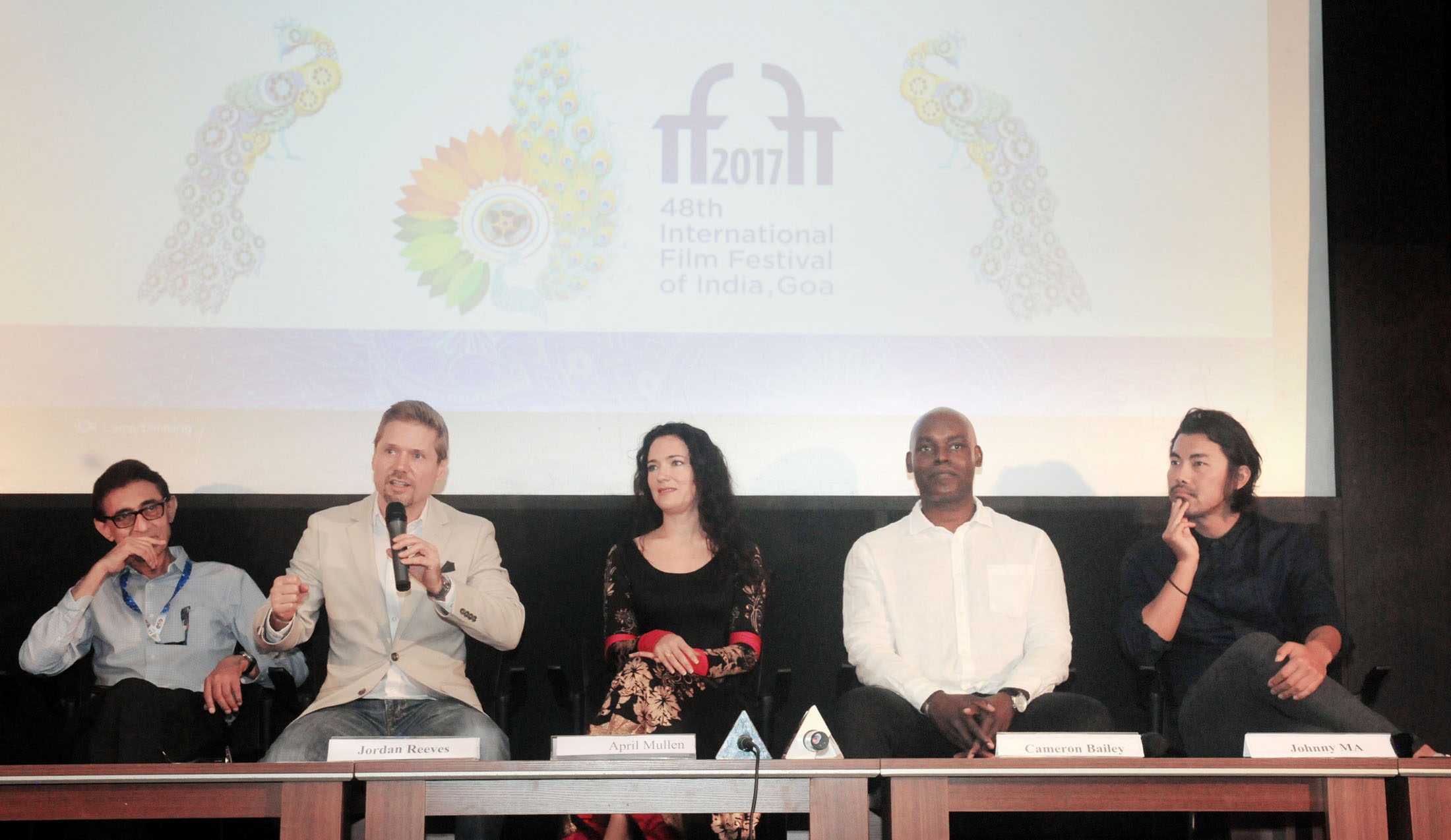
- Johnny Ma, IFFI (2017)
- Born: Ma Nan; Shanghai, China
- Education: Columbia University
- Occupations: Director, screenwriter
- Years active: 2000s–present
- Notable work: A Grand Canal, Old Stone, To Live to Sing

Johnny Ma (born Ma Nan, 马楠 in Shanghai) is a Chinese-Canadian film director and screenwriter. He is best known for his debut feature film Old Stone, which premiered at the Berlin International Film Festival in 2016. The film won the awards for Best Canadian First Feature Film at the 2016 Toronto International Film Festival, and Best First Feature at the 5th Canadian Screen Awards in 2017. His second feature To Live to Sing premiered at the Director's Fortnight Section of the 2019 Cannes Film Festival.

== Early life ==
Ma moved from Shanghai to Toronto, Ontario with his family when he was 10 years of age. He attended the University of British Columbia, studying commerce at the behest of his parents, and after working in Shanghai and Wenzhou, decided to pursue a degree in film at Columbia University in New York City in 2010.

== Career ==
Ma made a number of short films before breaking through to wider success with A Grand Canal in 2013. That film, which premiered at the 2013 Toronto International Film Festival, was named to TIFF's Canada's Top Ten list as one of the ten best Canadian short films of the year, and was a Canadian Screen Award nominee for Best Live Action Short Drama at the 2nd Canadian Screen Awards.

Ma's planned first feature film was Ten Thousand Happiness, for which he won the Beijing International Screenwriting Competition in 2013 and Telefilm Canada's Pitch This! competition in 2014. After difficulty securing financing, he put it on hold and proceeded with Old Stone, a script he was developing as his potential second film.

At the 5th Canadian Screen Awards, Old Stone was also a nominee for Best Picture; Ma was also nominated for Best Original Screenplay.

To Live to Sing was completed in 2019 and premiered at the 2019 Cannes Film Festival Director's Fortnight. It went on to win both Best Film and Best Actress at the 2019 Shanghai International Film Festival.

== Filmography ==
Year	Film	Director	Producer	Writer	Actor	Cinematographer	Format
2009	Shanghai Connection				Yes		Short
2010	The Robbery	Yes	Yes	Yes			
2011	The Genius from Quintino	Yes	Yes	Yes			Short
2011	Play	Yes	Yes	Yes			Short
2012	Dec 32	Yes					Short
2013	Mineirinho do Riacho		Yes			Yes	Short
2013	A Grand Canal	Yes		Yes	Yes		Short
2015	Devil's Work		Yes				Short
2016	Old Stone	Yes		Yes			Feature
2019	To Live to Sing		Yes				Feature
2020	Johnny Ma	Yes		Yes	Yes		Short
2024	The Mother and the Bear						Feature

Ma contributed a short film to the Netflix series Homemade, released in June 2020. Set in San Sebastián del Oeste, Mexico, the short is centred around a letter Ma writes to his mother, voiced over in Mandarin.
