= Anup Singh (filmmaker) =

Indian film director

- Born: March 14, 1961 (age 64); Dar-Es-Salaam, Tanzania
- Occupation: Filmmaker
- Known for: Qissa
- Spouse: Catherine Saget

Anup Singh (born 14 March 1961) is Geneva based filmmaker, born in Dar-Es-Salaam, Tanzania, East Africa and grew up in a Sikh family of Punjab origin.

== Biography ==
Anup Singh was born on 14 March 1961 in Dar-Es-Salaam, Tanzania. His family fled Tanzania and came to Bombay in 1971. He graduated in literature and philosophy from the Bombay University and from the Film and TV Institute of India, Pune. He directed films for Indian TV, and was a consultant for BBC2. He now teaches at a film school in Geneva.

== Filmography ==
| Year | Title | Notes |
|---|---|---|
| 2003 | Ekti Nadir Naam (The Name of a River) | The film was based on Indian filmmaker Ritwik Ghatak whom Anup Singh considers as his teacher. |
| 2013 | Qissa - The Tale of a Lonely Ghost | |
| 2017 | The Song of Scorpions | |

== See also ==
Ritwik Ghatak
