= Hubert Mingarelli =

French writer (1956–2020)

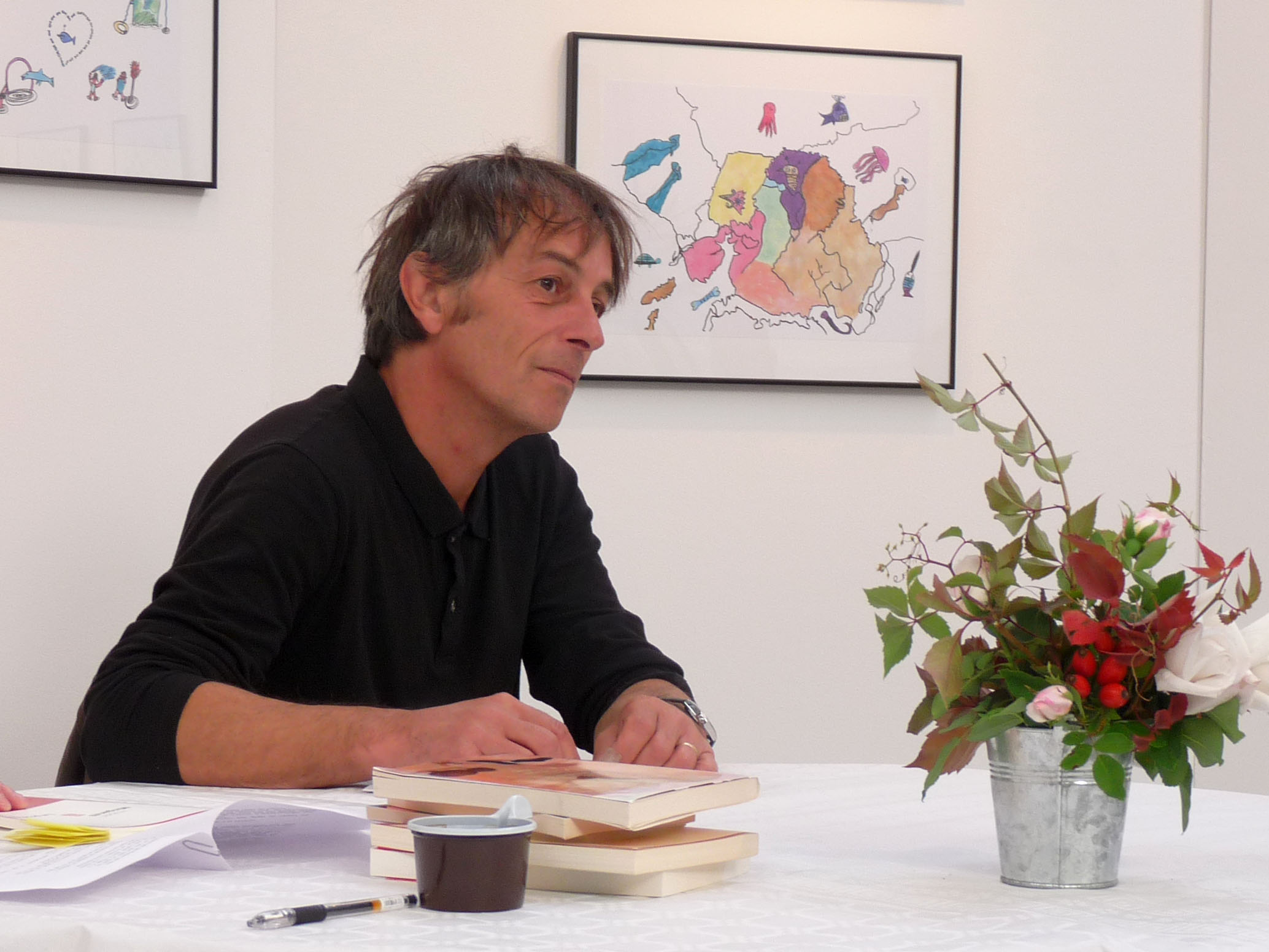
Hubert Mingarelli (2009)

Hubert Mingarelli (14 January 1956 – 26 January 2020) was a French writer. He was born in Mont-Saint-Martin in Lorraine. After serving in the navy for three years, he settled in the southern city of Grenoble. He won the Prix Medici in 2003 for his novel Quatre Soldats (Four Soldiers). The English translation of his novel Un repas en hiver (A Meal in Winter) by Sam Taylor was nominated for the Independent Foreign Fiction Prize.

He died on 26 January 2020 from cancer.

== Bibliography ==
- Le Secret du funambule, Milan, coll. Zanzibar, 1990
- Le Bruit du vent, Gallimard Page blanche, 1991; nouv. édition en Page blanche, 1998; Folio junior, 2003 puis 2013
- La Lumière volée, Gallimard Page blanche, 1993; nouv. édition en Page Blanche, 1999; Folio junior, 2009 puis 2012
- Le Jour de la cavalerie, Le Seuil, 1995; Points Seuil, 2003
- L'Arbre, Le Seuil, 1996.
- Vie de sable, Le Seuil,1998.
- Une rivière verte et silencieuse, Le Seuil, 1999; Points Seuil, 2001
- La Dernière Neige, Le Seuil, 2000 . Points Seuil, 2002
- La Beauté des loutres, Le Seuil, 2002; Points Seuil, 2004
- Quatre Soldats, Le Seuil, 2003. (Prix Médicis); Points Seuil, 2004
- Hommes sans mère, Le Seuil, 2004; Points Seuil, 2005
- Le Voyage d'Eladio, Le Seuil, 2005.
- Océan Pacifique, Le Seuil, 2006.
- Marcher sur la rivière, Le Seuil, 2007.
- La Promesse, Le Seuil, 2009.
- L'Année du soulèvement, Le Seuil, 2010.
- La lettre de Buenos Aires, Buchet-Chastel, 2011
- La Source, Cadex, 2012
- Un repas en hiver, Stock, 2012
- L’homme qui avait soif, Stock, 2014
- L’Incendie, avec Antoine Choplin, Éditions La Fosse aux ours, 2015
- La route de Beit Zera, Stock, 2015; Points Seuil, 2016
- Une histoire de tempête, Éditions du sonneur, 2015
- La Terre invisible, Buchet-Chastel, 2019

=== Translations ===
- A Meal in Winter (Un repas en hiver), translated by Sam Taylor (2012) Portobello Books ISBN 1846275342
- Four Soldiers (Quatre Soldats), translated by Sam Taylor (2018) Portobello Books, ISBN 9781846276507
- The Invisible Land (La Terre invisible), translated by Sam Taylor (2021) Granta, ISBN 9781783786022
