= Ningen (2013 film) =

2013 film

- Film poster
- Directed by: Guillaume Giovanetti; Cagla Zencirci
- Written by: Guillaume Giovanetti; Cagla Zencirci
- Produced by: Hiroyuki Tanimoto
- Starring: Masahiro Yoshino
- Cinematography: Shinichi Tsunoda
- Release date: 8 September 2013 (TIFF)
- Running time: 104 minutes
- Countries: Japan; Turkey
- Language: Japanese

Ningen (人間, which translates as 'human') is a 2013 Japanese-Turkish drama film written and directed by Guillaume Giovanetti and Cagla Zencirci. The story is a "modern parable of a kitsune and tanuki" involving a Japanese CEO. It was screened in the Contemporary World Cinema section at the 2013 Toronto International Film Festival.

== Cast ==
- Masahiro Yoshino
- Megumi Ayukawaa
- Xiao Mu Lee
- Masako Wajima
