= Noah (2013 film) =

- Film poster
- Directed by: Walter Woodman; Patrick Cederberg
- Written by: Walter Woodman; Patrick Cederberg
- Produced by: Walter Woodman; Patrick Cederberg; Matthew Hornick
- Starring: Sam Kantor; Caitlin McConkey-Pirie; Nina Iordanova
- Edited by: Patrick Cederberg
- Release date: September 2013 (TIFF)
- Running time: 17 minutes
- Country: Canada
- Language: English

Noah is a Canadian short drama film, released in 2013. Written and directed by Walter Woodman and Patrick Cederberg as a class project when they were film students at Ryerson University, the film tells the story of Noah's (Sam Kantor) breakup with his girlfriend Amy (Caitlin McConkie-Pirie) entirely through Noah's use of computer applications such as Facebook, Skype, YouTube, Chatroulette and iTunes.

The film premiered at the 2013 Toronto International Film Festival, where it won the award for Best Canadian Short Film. It subsequently won the Canadian Screen Award for Best Live Action Short Drama at the 2nd Canadian Screen Awards.

The film was also one of the inspirations for the Modern Family episode "Connection Lost".

Woodman, Cederberg and Matthew Hornick, the film's coproducer, were subsequently active as the indie pop band Shy Kids, who received a Prism Prize nomination in 2016 for the animated music video for their single "Rockets".

== Plot Summary ==
The film opens with high school senior Noah (Sam Kantor) logging onto his computer. While preparing for his impending relocation to college, he video-chats with his girlfriend, Amy (Caitlin McConkie-Pirie), via Skype. Misinterpreting Amy's attempts to discuss their future as an intention to end the relationship, Noah falls into a state of emotional panic.To distract himself, Noah bounces frantically between various web services. He browses adult websites, scrolls through Facebook, logs into iTunes, and cycles through strangers on Chatroulette. His anxiety worsens, leading him to guess Amy's password and log into her private Facebook account. Upon reading her private messages with another male peer, Noah misinterprets the friendly conversation as romantic betrayal. Driven by jealousy, he deletes her Facebook profile, an act that permanently severs his real-world relationship with Amy and leaves him isolated behind his screen.

== See also ==
- Computer screen film
