= In Guns We Trust =

2013 Canadian short documentary film

- Directed by: Nicolas Lévesque
- Written by: Nicolas Lévesque
- Produced by: Nicolas Lévesque
- Cinematography: Nicolas Lévesque
- Edited by: Guillaume Langlois
- Release date: September 9, 2013 (TIFF)
- Running time: 12 minutes
- Country: Canada
- Language: English

In Guns We Trust is a Canadian short documentary film, directed by Nicolas Lévesque and released in 2013. The film profiles Kennesaw, a community in the US state of Georgia where a municipal ordinance requires all homeowners to possess at least one gun.

The film premiered at the 2013 Toronto International Film Festival. It was subsequently named to TIFF's annual year-end Canada's Top Ten list for 2013.
