= All the Wrong Reasons (film) =

- Directed by: Gia Milani
- Written by: Gia Milani
- Produced by: Phyllis Laing; Gia Milani; Tony Whalen
- Starring: Karine Vanasse; Cory Monteith; Kevin Zegers; Emily Hampshire
- Cinematography: Stéphanie Weber Biron
- Edited by: Thorben Bieger
- Music by: Ari Posner
- Production companies: Strong Arm Pictures; Buffalo Gal Pictures; Shore Road Pictures
- Distributed by: Pacific Northwest Pictures
- Release date: 8 September 2013 (TIFF)
- Running time: 119 minutes
- Country: Canada
- Language: English

All the Wrong Reasons is a 2013 Canadian comedy-drama film written and directed by Gia Milani. It stars Karine Vanasse, Cory Monteith, Kevin Zegers and Emily Hampshire. The film was released at the 2013 Toronto International Film Festival.

== Plot ==
The film is set in the Fairfax Department store, a big-box outlet in which Kate Ascher (Vanasse) works as a security guard while her husband James (Monteith) is the store's manager. Kate is unable to touch other people - including her husband - or even have them near her due to the traumatic stress of seeing her sister commit suicide. After James tries unsuccessfully to bring Kate out of her isolation, he pursues intimacy from one of the store's cashiers, Nicole (Hampshire).

Simon Brunson (Zegers) joins the store staff. He faces his own stresses after being injured in his former job as a firefighter. His efforts to deal with his situation inspires Kate to lash out against her cheating husband, ruin his career and cost Nicole custody of her son, which allows Kate to begin her recovery of a normal life with Simon.

== Cast ==
- Cory Monteith as James Ascher
- Karine Vanasse as Kate Ascher
- Kevin Zegers as Simon Brunson
- Emily Hampshire as Nicole Cambria
- Glen Lefchak as Joe
- Denis Theriault as Radley
- Marguerite McNeil as Rhonda

== Production ==
Shooting was conducted in Halifax during mid-2012 and concluded on 15 August 2012. The film was produced by Shore Road Pictures (Gia Milani & Tony Whalen) and Buffalo Gal Pictures (Phyllis Laing).

Funding for the film was provided by Telefilm Canada, the Province of New Brunswick, Nova Scotia Tax Credits, Pacific Northwest Pictures and Myriad Pictures. It is slated to air on The Movie Network and Movie Central in 2014. Pacific Northwest Pictures is the Canadian distributor while international sales is handled by Myriad Pictures.

== Awards and nominations ==
The film won the Grolsch Film Works Discovery Award at the 2013 Toronto International Film Festival.

The film won the Viewer's Choice Award at the Silver Wave Film Festival

Denis Theriault was nominated by ACTRA Maritimes for Outstanding Male Performance Feature Film, Movie of the Week, Television, or web-series for his role as Radley Weil in All the Wrong Reasons.

The screenplay won the Slamdance Film Festival's 2009 Script Accessible Award as part of that festival's Feature Screenplay Competition.
