= The Chaperone 3D =

- Film poster
- Directed by: Fraser Munden
- Written by: Fraser Munden; Neil Rathbone
- Produced by: Michael Glasz; Evren Boisjoli
- Narrated by: Ralph Whims; Stefan Czernatowicz
- Cinematography: Fraser Munden
- Edited by: Fraser Munden
- Production company: Thoroughbread Pictures
- Release date: September 11, 2013 (TIFF)
- Running time: 13 minutes
- Country: Canada
- Language: English

The Chaperone 3D is a Canadian documentary film, directed by Fraser Munden and released in 2013. Blending several different styles of animation and puppetry, the film reenacts the true story of Ralph Whims and Stefan Czernatowicz, who were once present as a chaperone and DJ at a school dance that was invaded by a biker gang which Whims and Czernatowicz had to personally fight off.

The film premiered at the 2013 Toronto International Film Festival and was the runner up for best short film.

The film was named to TIFF's annual year-end Canada's Top Ten list for 2013, and received a Canadian Screen Award nomination for Best Short Documentary Film at the 3rd Canadian Screen Awards.
