= Michael Jorgensen =

Canadian filmmaker and producer

- Occupations: Film producer; Film director
- Years active: 1974–present

Michael Jorgensen is a Canadian filmmaker and producer. He worked as a photojournalist throughout the 1980s and 1990s. He worked in Somalia in 1992 before the United Nations sanctioned Operation Restore Hope. Jorgensen has trained numerous reporters and producers at the Canadian Broadcasting Corporation as well as the staff for the Canadian science TV series Daily Planet.

Jorgensen won a 2003 Emmy for Best Long Form News and Current Affairs Documentary for Battle of the X-Planes, based on his access to a U.S. Department of Defense weapons competition in 1998.

Jorgensen founded Myth Merchant Films in 1997 to create and produce science, history and social documentaries for television and film.

== Background ==
- Maker of Lost Nuke, a 2004 documentary about the U.S.'s first lost nuclear weapon
- Supervising producer for Mars Rising, a TV series on the Discovery Channel
- Producer, writer, and director of Secrets of the Dinosaur Mummy for Discovery Channel Networks International
- Producer, writer, and director of Hunt for the Mad Trapper for the Discovery Channel
- Producer, writer, and director of the TV special Hitler's Stealth Fighter (2009), about the Horten Ho 229 for National Geographic
- Maker of the 2013 feature documentary film Unclaimed
