= Zack Parker =

American director, writer and producer

- Born: July 25, 1978 (age 48); Indiana, U.S.
- Education: University of California
- Occupations: Director; Writer; Producer
- Years active: 2006–2013
- Spouse: Divorced

Zack Parker is an American director and screenwriter. He was described as a "one-man Hollywood" by The New York Times for his low-budget high-concept films with unnerving themes. He was raised in the small midwestern town of Richmond, Indiana He was divorced in 2025 and has three children.

== Career ==
Parker attended University of California where he first began working as a production assistant on the show Black Scorpion. However, it wasn't until working with Margo Martindale on his third film, Scalene, that he became known for direction. Parker is perhaps best known for directing and writing Proxy which premiered at the 2013 Toronto International Film Festival and stars Kristina Klebe, Alexa Havins and Joe Swanberg. In an interview with Filmmaker magazine, Parker said he finds most of his financing from investors in the Midwest, which he finds easier than raising money in New York, Los Angeles or Chicago.

== Filmography ==
As of 2021, Parker has directed 4 full-length films.

Year	Title	Distributor
2006	Inexchange	Brain Damage Films
2007	Quench	Vanguard Cinema
2011	Scalene	Breaking Glass Pictures
2013	Proxy	IFC Midnight
