= Chen Gang (actor) =

Chinese actor

- Simplified Chinese: 陈刚
- Traditional Chinese: 陳剛
Transcriptions
Standard Mandarin
- Hanyu Pinyin: Chén Gāng
- IPA: [ʈʂʰə̌n káŋ]

Chen Gang (Chinese: 陈刚) is a Chinese actor. He is most noted for his lead performance in the 2016 film Old Stone, for which he garnered a Canadian Screen Award nomination for Best Actor at the 5th Canadian Screen Awards.
