= Shy Kids =

Canadian indie pop band

- Origin: Toronto, Ontario, Canada
- Genres: indie pop
- Years active: 2012–present
- Label: Independent
- Members: Patrick Cederberg; Matthew Hornick; Walter Woodman
- Past members: Greg Francis
- Website: Official website

Shy Kids (stylized as shy kids) are a Canadian indie pop band and film-making collective from Toronto, consisting of Walter Woodman, Patrick Cederberg, and Matthew Hornick.

== History ==
The band released their debut EP field trips in 2012, followed by the full-length album Lofty! in 2015. Lofty!'s lead single "®ockets" was promoted with a music video animated entirely out of candy, chocolate bars, and various candy wrappers, which was a longlisted finalist for the Prism Prize in 2016. The album's subsequent singles included "Terminally in Love with You", a collaboration with Choir! Choir! Choir!, and "Noodie".

Shy Kids moved for a short time to Los Angeles; they returned without having achieved commercial success there, but with material developed for future projects.

In January 2018, the band released a single, "I Feel Like a Failure". In February that year, they released their second full-length album in a state. They also released the debut single from the record, "the middle". The music video was shot on location at Canada's Markham Fair in late 2016.

In 2021, the band was one of the first artists signed to Canadian label Everything Forever out of Vancouver, British Columbia.

In 2023, they released their third LP, House Cats, through Everything Forever. Along with the singles, "Fresh Off A Feeling", "Lovin' You (Baby)", and title track, "House Cats". As of 2024, the band has left their label and are moving forward independently.

In 2024, they won the Hi-Fidelity Award from the Prism Prize for their innovation in the creation of music videos.

== Discography ==
- 2015 - Lofty!
- 2018 - In a State
- 2023 - House Cats
- 2025 - a gathering of batteries

== Related projects ==
Cederberg and Woodman are both graduates of the film studies program at Ryerson University. While there, they collaborated on the short film Noah, which won both the award for Best Canadian Short Film at the 2013 Toronto International Film Festival, and the Canadian Screen Award for Best Live Action Short Drama at the 2nd Canadian Screen Awards. The group subsequently signed with Anonymous Content.

The collective animated the screen elements of the Australian screenlife comedy web series Content (2019).
