= Alex Crowther =

Canadian actor

Alexander Crowther is a Canadian actor. He is most noted for his performance as Aaron Warner in the 2020 film Flowers of the Field, for which he received a Vancouver Film Critics Circle Award nomination for Best Actor in a Canadian Film at the Vancouver Film Critics Circle Awards 2020.

He previously had a recurring role as Johan Fehr in the television series Pure, and has had guest appearances in the television series Reign, The Girlfriend Experience, Departure and Frankie Drake Mysteries, and the films Paradise Falls, American Hangman and Georgetown. In January 2020 he starred in a stage production of Ödön von Horváth's Casimir and Caroline for The Howland Company, for which the cast were collectively nominated for Outstanding Performance by an Ensemble at the 2020 Dora Mavor Moore Awards.
