= Lee Sanders =

American composer

- Occupation: Composer
- Known for: The Amazing Race, New Line Cinema's The Lord of the Rings website
- Website: http://www.sandersmusic.net

Lee Sanders is an American composer who began his composing career in 2001 with his scores for New Line Cinema's The Lord of the Rings website and CBS's reality-competition show The Amazing Race. Lee has won six BMI Film and Television Awards for his work, as well as the 2008 Film and Television Music Award for Outstanding Reality Show Score. He is also known for composing the fanfare for the Sony Pictures Home Entertainment logo, which was also used on the Sony Pictures Consumer Products, Sony Pictures Entertainment Japan, Sony Pictures Releasing International, Sony Pictures International Productions and Sony Pictures logos.

== Work ==
Sanders has scored hundreds of episodes of network television, including music for nine-time Emmy award-winner The Amazing Race, The Bachelor, Project Runway and many others. Lee has taught film scoring for UCLA Extension, and is a frequent lecturer for emerging composers and filmmakers at both USC and UCLA. He also serves as a member of the Music Peer Group Executive Committee of the Academy of Television Arts and Sciences. As a conductor, orchestrator and additional music composer, Sanders has also contributed to shows such as Family Guy, Charmed, Fairly Oddparents, Ripley’s Believe It or Not! and Disney’s House of Mouse. He also composed the fanfare for the Sony Pictures Home Entertainment logo, which was also used on the Sony Pictures Consumer Products, Sony Pictures Entertainment Japan, Sony Pictures Releasing International, Sony Pictures International Productions and Sony Pictures logos.

== Filmography ==
This is a partial list of works Sanders has created or been involved with.

- 2001–2024 The Amazing Race (TV series, 382 episodes)
- 2008–2012 Dorkumentary (TV series, 6 episodes)
- 2011 The Amazing Race Australia (TV series, 12 episodes)
- 2011 Stu Plus Who? (documentary)
- 2011 Bloodwork
- 2010 After the Fall (TV movie)
- 2010 The Amazing Race Asia (TV series, 1 episode)
- 2010 The Bachelor (TV series, 1 episode)
- 2009 Popatopolis (documentary)
- 2003-2009 Storyline Online (TV series, 5 episodes)
- 2008 The Unwelcomed (short)
- 2008 Here Be Dragons (video short)
- 2007 Serene Hunter (short)
- 2006 The Miracle Workers (TV series documentary)
- 2005 Formosa
- 2005 Sacrifice
- 2005 The Two-Timer (TV series)
- 2004 What Babies Want (documentary)
- 2004 Seen (short)
- 2003 Not Too Tart, Not Too Sweet (short)
- 2002 Lords of the Barrio (video)
- 2002 Walkin' Free (short)
- 2001 A Passage to Middle-earth: Making of 'Lord of the Rings' (TV documentary)
- 2001 Roam (short)
- 2001 The Barrio Murders
- 2000 Desertopia (documentary short)
- 2000 I Am on Film
- 2000 Dinner (short)
- 1999 The Business Card (short)
- 1999 Tigers Made in Heaven (short)
- 1998 Show and Prove (short)
- 1998 Life Is a Sweet (short)
- 1998 Sometimes Santa's Gotta Get Whacked (short)
- 1998 Screwed: A Hollywood Bedtime Story
- 1998 Thursday Afternoon (short)

== Music Department ==
- 2006–2009 The Bachelor (composer and additional music, TV series, 5 episodes)
- 2008 The Bachelorette (composer, TV series, 2 episodes)
- Storyline Online (composer, stock music, theme music, TV series, 4 episodes)
- 2005 HBO First Look (TV series documentary) (additional musician, 1 episode)
- 2004 Fighting Tommy Riley (composer: additional music)
- 1998 Thursday Afternoon (short) (score producer)
