= The Dark Matter of Love =

- Poster of The Dark Matter of Love
- Directed by: Sarah McCarthy
- Written by: Sarah McCarthy
- Produced by: Sarah McCarthy; Grace Hughes-Hallet
- Cinematography: Liam Iandoli
- Edited by: John Mister
- Music by: Molly Nyman
- Release date: April 2013
- Running time: 93 minutes
- Language: English
- Budget: £150,000 (estimated)

The Dark Matter of Love is a 2013 feature-length documentary film directed by Sarah McCarthy. It is about an American family adopting three Russian children at once, and how they coped with the challenges behind bonding with children raised in an orphanage.

The documentary features Dr Robert Marvin, Professor Emeritus at the University of Virginia School of Medicine, helping the cause of the family through a psychological consultation.

The Dark Matter of Love has been premiered at the 5th Moscow International Film Festival, where it was nominated for the Silver St. George - Best Film of the Documentary Competition. It was also pitched at the Sheffield Doc/Fest 2010 MeetMarket prior to completion.
