= Impromptu (2013 film) =

- Directed by: Bruce Alcock
- Written by: Bruce Alcock; Edward Riche
- Produced by: Annette Clarke; Michael Fukushima; Tina Ouellette
- Starring: Robert Joy
- Edited by: Cesare Battista
- Animation by: Bruce Alcock; Cesare Battista
- Production company: National Film Board of Canada
- Release date: September 2013 (TIFF)
- Running time: 10 minutes
- Country: Canada

Impromptu is a Canadian animated short film directed by Bruce Alcock and released in 2013. The film centres on Chuck (Robert Joy), a man preparing dinner during which he plans to talk to his wife about their relationship difficulties, but has his plans upended when his wife unexpectedly invites a whole raft of her co-workers home to join them.

The voice cast also includes Otto Alcock, Liz Solo, Mary Lewis, Sean Panting, Brian Marler and Jane Dingle.

The film premiered at the 2013 Toronto International Film Festival.

The film was a Canadian Screen Award nominee for Best Animated Short at the 2nd Canadian Screen Awards in 2014.
