= Nicolas Lévesque (director) =

Canadian filmmaker

Nicolas Lévesque is a Canadian documentary filmmaker from Roberval, Quebec, He is most noted for his 2020 documentary film The Free Ones (Les Libres).

He previously directed a number of short documentary films, including In Guns We Trust and Interview with a Free Man (Entrevue avec un homme libre). In Guns We Trust was named to the Toronto International Film Festival's annual Canada's Top Ten list in 2013, and Interview with a Free Man was named to the Canada's Top Ten in 2015.

He made his full-length debut in 2018 with We Hunt Seals (Chasseurs de phoques).
