= Gia Milani =

Canadian screenwriter and director

Gia Milani (born in Fredericton, New Brunswick) is a Canadian screenwriter and director. She attended the University of New Brunswick, and the New Brunswick College of Craft and Design, before graduating in 2001 with her Bachelor of Applied Arts in Fine Craft.

Milani's debut feature film, All the Wrong Reasons, premiered at the Toronto International Film Festival in 2013, where she won the $10,000 Grolsch Film Works Discovery Award. The same year, Milani was named one of Canada's Top film talents to watch by CBC. She is the first woman from New Brunswick to have a feature film screen at TIFF.

In late 2009, Milani won the Script Accessible Award for her then unproduced screenplay All the Wrong Reasons. She picked up the award at the 2010 Slamdance Film Festival.

Milani won the $25,000 CBC Television 3-2-1 Award in 2008 for her short film A Dark Radius, loosely based on human trafficking in New Brunswick.

In 2007, Milani directed a music video for the band Hey Rosetta!, for the song The Year You Were Born, though an initiative by the Atlantic Film Festival's 10 x 10 Music Series that paired bands with directors for a 3-day competition. The video went on to win The Most Unique Film at the Silver Wave Film Festival and screened at several festivals including the NSI.

Milani's work has played on CBC Television, The Movie Network, HBO Canada, and The Movie Channel.

== Awards ==
Year	Award	Work	Result
2013	Grolsch Filmworks Discovery Award at Toronto International Film Festival	All the Wrong Reasons	Won
2013	Viewers Choice Award Silver wave Film Festival	All the Wrong Reasons	Won
2009	Slamdance Script Accessible Award	All the Wrong Reasons	Won
2009	Final Draft Big Break Competition	All the Wrong Reasons	Semi-finalist (Top 20 in 3200)
2009	Best Drama - Silver Wave Film Festival	A Dark Radius	Won
2009	William F White Excellence in Screenwriting	A Dark Radius	Won
2008	CBC 3-2-1 Award - CBC Television	A Dark Radius	Won
2007	Most Unique Film - Silverwave Film Festival	The Year You Were Born	Won
