= Stéphane Moukarzel =

Lebanese-Canadian film director

Stéphane Moukarzel is a Lebanese-Canadian film director and screenwriter from Quebec, whose debut feature film Evergreen$ (Sapin$) was released in 2023.

A graduate of the Institut national de l'image et du son, he directed a number of short films prior to Evergreen$. The most noted of these, Time Flies (Nous avions), was a Canadian Screen Award nominee for Best Live Action Short Drama at the 2nd Canadian Screen Awards in 2014, and a Prix Jutra nominee for Best Short Film at the 16th Jutra Awards.

== Filmography ==
- L'Épitaphe - 2010
- U-Turn - 2011
- En roue libre - 2012
- Time Flies (Nous avions) - 2013
- Two Worlds (Deux mondes) - 2015
- Aspirations - 2017
- Black Friday - 2018
- Evergreen$ (Sapin$) - 2023
