= Graham Foy =

Canadian cinematographer and director

Graham Foy (born July 27, 1987, in Edmonton, Alberta) is a Canadian filmmaker, who has worked both under his own name and as Fantavious Fritz. He is most noted for his debut feature film The Maiden, which won the Cinema of the Future award at the 2022 Venice Film Festival and was nominated for the John Dunning Best First Feature Award at the 11th Canadian Screen Awards in 2023.

His filmography also includes the short films Kosmos (2011), Tuesday (2012), Paradise Falls (2013), Lewis (2015), Mouseland (2017), Good Boy (2018) and August 22, This Year (2020). Paradise Falls was named to the Toronto International Film Festival's annual Canada's Top Ten list in 2013, and August 22, This Year was an official selection of the International Critics' Week program at the 2020 Cannes Film Festival.

His music video for Charlotte Day Wilson's single "Work", won the Prism Prize in 2018. He was also a Prism Prize nominee in 2017 for BadBadNotGood's "Lavender".
