= Christian de la Cortina =

Canadian actor, film producer, writer, and director

- Born: October 4, 1979; Cowansville, Quebec, Canada

Christian de la Cortina Castaneda (born October 4, 1979) is a Canadian actor, film producer, writer, and director.

He made his directorial debut with movies such as Transit (2009) and M39 (2015). He presently works as both an actor and director in Quebec.

== Early life ==
De la Cortina was born in Cowansville, Quebec, Canada. His Chilean parents and older brother moved to Canada in 1975 after 1973's Coup d'État. He holds a degree in commerce from the University of Sherbrooke, and has completed a course in cinema at the INIS.

== Career ==
After graduating from University of Sherbrooke, in Commerce, Christian became an actor. He worked as an extra in American films produced in Montreal, while taking acting classes.

In 2003, he applied at Royal Caribbean to become staff onboard cruise ships. He was hired by the cruise line and was sent to California to cruise on the Pacific Ocean as an Entertainer. Six months later, he came back to Canada with enough savings to produce two shorts films that granted him access to the Canadian actors union ACTRA, allowing him to audition for roles and get an agent.

The next year, de la Cortina studied to become a producer/filmmaker at Institut national de l'image et du son (INIS), a cinema school in Montreal. After earning his diploma, he started landing roles while producing his own material.

In 2005, de la Cortina and Frank Baylis (owner of Baylis Medical Company) started a production company called: The Walk of Fame Entertainment. In 2009, their first independent film "Carjacking" was released and distributed by Entertainment One and sold in more than six countries around the world including Japan and England.

Their second feature film called M39 also featuring Michael Madsen and Sergio Hernandez has finished filming in August 2014 and is intended for release in 2015.
