= Hello Destroyer =

2016 Canadian film

- Film poster
- Directed by: Kevan Funk
- Written by: Kevan Funk
- Produced by: Daniel Domachowski; Haydn Wazelle
- Starring: Jared Abrahamson
- Cinematography: Benjamin Loeb
- Edited by: Ajla Odobašić
- Music by: Edo Van Breemen
- Production companies: Tabula Dada; Type One
- Distributed by: Tabula Dada
- Release date: 10 September 2016 (TIFF)
- Running time: 110 minutes
- Country: Canada
- Language: English

Hello Destroyer is a 2016 Canadian drama film written and directed by Kevan Funk. It had its world premiere in the Discovery section at the 2016 Toronto International Film Festival.

The film stars Jared Abrahamson as an enforcer on a hockey team who faces difficult consequences when a hit on an opposing player during a game turns more violent than intended. It was nominated for four Canadian Screen Awards, including Best Motion Picture.

== Cast ==
- Jared Abrahamson as Tyson Burr
- Kurt Max Runte as Coach Dale Milbury
- Joe Buffalo as Eric
- Paul McGillion as Ron Burr
- Sara Canning as Wendy Davis
- Michael Kopsa as Judge

== Production ==
The film was an expansion of his 2013 short film Destroyer.

According to Funk, his intention was to make a film that explored institutional and systemic violence rather than a sports film per se; he chose a hockey-related setting as it represented an "aggressively Canadian" cultural institution which has a complex relationship with violence and "toxic masculinity", and has stated that if he were making the same film in the United States he would likely have chosen a military setting.

The film was shot primarily in Prince George, British Columbia, including at the CN Centre.

== Reception ==
On the review aggregator website Rotten Tomatoes, 100% of 11 critics' reviews are positive.

Vice Sports describes the film as "about how violence is cultivated, showcased and then punished within a set of institutions that require its presence to be profitable", and Alex Rose of the magazine Cult MTL called the film "as Canadian as a Weakerthans song and as depressing as that second Leonard Cohen record."

On 7 December 2016, the film was named to the Toronto International Film Festival's annual Canada's Top 10 list.

=== Accolades ===
The film received four Canadian Screen Award nominations at the 5th Canadian Screen Awards in 2017, including Best Motion Picture and Best Actor (Abrahamson).

Awards	Date of ceremony	Category	Recipients and nominees	Result	Ref(s)
Canadian Screen Awards	12 March 2017	Best Motion Picture	Daniel Domachowski, Haydn Wazelle	Nominated	
Canadian Screen Awards	12 March 2017	Best Director	Kevan Funk	Nominated	
Canadian Screen Awards	12 March 2017	Best Actor	Jared Abrahamson	Nominated	
Canadian Screen Awards	12 March 2017	Best Original Screenplay	Kevan Funk	Nominated	
Leo Awards	2017	Best Motion Picture	Haydn Wazelle, Daniel Domachowski	Won	
Leo Awards	2017	Best Direction in a Motion Picture	Kevan Funk	Won	
Leo Awards	2017	Best Screenwriting in a Motion Picture	Kevan Funk	Won	
Leo Awards	2017	Best Cinematography in a Motion Picture	Benjamin Loeb	Won	
Leo Awards	2017	Best Supporting Performance by a Male in a Motion Picture	Kurt Max Runte	Nominated	
Leo Awards	2017	Best Supporting Performance by a Male in a Motion Picture	Joe Buffalo	Nominated	
Leo Awards	2017	Best Lead Performance by a Male in a Motion Picture	Jared Abrahamson	Won	
Vancouver Film Critics Circle	16 December 2016	Best Canadian Film	Kevan Funk	Won	
Vancouver Film Critics Circle	16 December 2016	Best British Columbia Film	Kevan Funk	Won	
Vancouver Film Critics Circle	16 December 2016	Best Canadian Director	Kevan Funk	Won	
Vancouver Film Critics Circle	16 December 2016	Best Actor in a Canadian Film	Jared Abrahamson	Won	
Vancouver Film Critics Circle	16 December 2016	Best Supporting Actor in a Canadian Film	Kurt Max Runte	Won	
Vancouver International Film Festival	2016	BC Emerging Filmmaker Award	Kevan Funk	Won	

== See also ==
- List of films about ice hockey
