= Kevan Funk =

Canadian film director and screenwriter

Kevan Funk is a Canadian film director and screenwriter. His debut feature film, Hello Destroyer, was released in 2016.

== Early life ==
Originally from Vancouver, British Columbia, he is a graduate of Emily Carr University of Art and Design.

His younger brother, Tyler Funk, is also a filmmaker.

== Career ==
Funk directed several short films, including the Canada's Top Ten-listed Yellowhead (2013) and Bison (2014), before directing his first feature film, Hello Destroyer, which premiered in 2016. The film later garnered four Canadian Screen Award nominations at the 5th Canadian Screen Awards in 2017, including nods for Funk in the Best Director and Best Original Screenplay categories, and he won the award for Best Director of a Canadian Film at the Vancouver Film Critics Circle Awards 2016. At the Leo Awards in 2017, Funk won both Best Director and Best Screenplay for the film.

In 2017, Hello Destroyer was nominated for the $100,000 Rogers Best Canadian Film Award by the Toronto Film Critics Association.

Funk has also directed music videos for Brasstronaut, Wake Owl, The Zolas, Braids, Preoccupations and A Tribe Called Red. In 2017, he won a MuchMusic Video Award as Best Director for A Tribe Called Red's "Stadium Pow Wow", and in 2019 he won the Prism Prize for The Belle Game's "Low".
