= 2016 Toronto International Film Festival =

Annual Canadian film festival

- Festival poster
- Opening film: The Magnificent Seven
- Closing film: The Edge of Seventeen
- Location: Toronto, Canada
- Founded: 1976
- Awards: La La Land (People's Choice Award)
- Festival date: 8–18 September 2016
- Website: tiff.net/festivals/thefestival

TIFF chronology
- 2017 2015

The 41st annual Toronto International Film Festival was held from 8 to 18 September 2016. The first announcement of films to be screened at the festival took place on 26 July. Almost 400 films were shown.

== Awards ==
The festival's final awards were announced on 18 September.

Award	Film	Director
People's Choice Award	La La Land	Damien Chazelle
People's Choice Award First Runner Up	Lion	Garth Davis
People's Choice Award Second Runner Up	Queen of Katwe	Mira Nair
People's Choice Award: Documentaries	I Am Not Your Negro	Raoul Peck
People's Choice Award, Documentary First Runner Up	Abacus: Small Enough to Jail	Steve James
People's Choice Award, Documentary Second Runner Up	Before the Flood	Fisher Stevens
People's Choice Award: Midnight Madness	Free Fire	Ben Wheatley
People's Choice Award, Midnight Madness First Runner Up	The Autopsy of Jane Doe	André Øvredal
People's Choice Award, Midnight Madness Second Runner Up	Raw	Julia Ducournau
Platform Prize	Jackie	Pablo Larraín
Platform Prize, Honourable Mention	Hema Hema: Sing Me a Song While I Wait	Khyentse Norbu
Best Canadian Feature Film	Those Who Make Revolution Halfway Only Dig Their Own Graves	Mathieu Denis and Simon Lavoie
Best Canadian Short Film	Mutants	Alexandre Dostie
Best Canadian First Feature Film	Old Stone	Johnny Ma
Dropbox Discovery Program Filmmakers Award	Jeffrey	Yanillys Perez
FIPRESCI Discovery Prize	Kati Kati	Mbithi Masya
FIPRESCI Special Presentations	I Am Not Madame Bovary	Feng Xiaogang
Best International Short Film	Imago	Raymund Ribay Gutierrez
Netpac Award for World or International Asian Film Premiere	In Between	Maysaloun Hamoud

=== Jury members ===
==== Platform Jury ====
The jury for the Platform section (in its second year) comprised Brian de Palma (American director), Mahamat-Saleh Haroun (Chadian director), and Zhang Ziyi (Chinese actress). The Platform section (named for Jia Zhangke's film Platform) consists of "12 films of high artistic merit that demonstrate a strong directorial vision". The jury awarded the $25,000 prize to Jackie.

== Programme ==
The following films were selected:

=== Gala presentations ===
- A Monster Calls by J. A. Bayona
- Arrival by Denis Villeneuve
- Deepwater Horizon by Peter Berg
- The Edge of Seventeen by Kelly Fremon Craig
- The Headhunter's Calling by Mark Williams
- The Journey Is the Destination by Bronwen Hughes
- Justin Timberlake + The Tennessee Kids by Jonathan Demme
- LBJ by Rob Reiner
- Loving by Jeff Nichols
- The Magnificent Seven by Antoine Fuqua
- Norman by Joseph Cedar
- Planetarium by Rebecca Zlotowski
- The Promise by Terry George
- Queen of Katwe by Mira Nair
- The Rolling Stones Olé Olé Olé!: A Trip Across Latin America by Paul Dugdale
- The Secret Scripture by Jim Sheridan
- Snowden by Oliver Stone
- Strange Weather by Katherine Dieckmann
- Their Finest by Lone Scherfig
- A United Kingdom by Amma Asante

=== Special presentations ===
- 150 Milligrams by Emmanuelle Bercot
- The Age of Shadows by Kim Jee-woon
- All I See Is You by Marc Forster
- American Honey by Andrea Arnold
- American Pastoral by Ewan McGregor
- Asura: The City of Madness by Kim Sung-soo
- Barakah Meets Barakah by Mahmoud Sabbagh
- Barry by Vikram Gandhi
- Below Her Mouth by April Mullen
- The Birth of a Nation by Nate Parker
- Birth of the Dragon by George Nolfi
- Bleed for This by Ben Younger
- The Bleeder by Philippe Falardeau
- Blue Jay by Alex Lehmann
- Brain on Fire by Gerard Barrett
- Brimstone by Martin Koolhoven
- Brotherhood by Noel Clarke
- Burn Your Maps by Jordan Roberts
- Carrie Pilby by Susan Johnson
- Catfight by Onur Tukel
- Christine by Antonio Campos
- City of Tiny Lights by Pete Travis
- The Commune by Thomas Vinterberg
- A Death in the Gunj by Konkona Sen Sharma
- Denial by Mick Jackson
- The Duelist by Aleksey Mizgirev
- Elle by Paul Verhoeven
- The Exception by David Leveaux
- Foreign Body by Raja Amari
- Frantz by François Ozon
- The Handmaiden by Park Chan-wook
- Harmonium by Kōji Fukada
- I Am Not Madame Bovary by Feng Xiaogang
- I, Daniel Blake by Ken Loach
- In Dubious Battle by James Franco
- It's Only the End of the World by Xavier Dolan
- The Journey by Nick Hamm
- King of the Dancehall by Nick Cannon
- La La Land by Damien Chazelle
- Leehom Wang's Open Fire Concert Film by Homeboy Music and Inc.
- The Limehouse Golem by Juan Carlos Medina
- Lion by Garth Davis
- The Long Excuse by Miwa Nishikawa
- Manchester by the Sea by Kenneth Lonergan
- Mascots by Christopher Guest
- Maudie by Aisling Walsh
- Mean Dreams by Nathan Morlando
- Neruda by Pablo Larraín
- Nocturnal Animals by Tom Ford
- The Oath by Baltasar Kormákur
- Orphan by Arnaud des Pallières
- Paris Can Wait by Eleanor Coppola
- Paterson by Jim Jarmusch
- Rage by Lee Sang-il
- (Re) Assignment by Walter Hill
- The Salesman by Asghar Farhadi
- Salt and Fire by Werner Herzog
- Sing by Garth Jennings
- Souvenir by Bavo Defurne
- Things to Come by Mia Hansen-Løve
- Toni Erdmann by Maren Ade
- Trespass Against Us by Adam Smith
- Two Lovers and a Bear by Kim Nguyen
- Una by Benedict Andrews
- Unless by Alan Gilsenan
- Voyage of Time by Terrence Malick
- Wakefield by Robin Swicord
- Weirdos by Bruce McDonald
- Window Horses by Ann Marie Fleming

=== Midnight Madness ===
- The Autopsy of Jane Doe by André Øvredal
- The Belko Experiment by Greg McLean
- Blair Witch by Adam Wingard
- Dog Eat Dog by Paul Schrader
- Free Fire by Ben Wheatley
- The Girl with All the Gifts by Colm McCarthy
- Headshot by Kimo Stamboel and Timo Tjahjanto
- Rats by Morgan Spurlock
- Raw by Julia Ducournau
- Sadako vs. Kayako by Kōji Shiraishi

=== Masters ===
- After the Storm by Hirokazu Kore-eda
- Afterimage by Andrzej Wajda
- Anatomy of Violence by Deepa Mehta
- The Bait by Buddhadeb Dasgupta
- The Beautiful Days of Aranjuez by Wim Wenders
- Certain Women by Kelly Reichardt
- Fire at Sea by Gianfranco Rosi
- Graduation by Cristian Mungiu
- Hissein Habré, A Chadian Tragedy by Mahamat-Saleh Haroun
- J: Beyond Flamenco by Carlos Saura
- Julieta by Pedro Almodóvar
- Land of the Gods by Goran Paskaljević
- Ma' Rosa by Brillante Mendoza
- The Net by Kim Ki-duk
- Never Ever by Benoît Jacquot
- Personal Shopper by Olivier Assayas
- Pinneyum by Adoor Gopalakrishnan
- A Quiet Passion by Terence Davies
- Safari by Ulrich Seidl
- Sieranevada by Cristi Puiu
- Sweet Dreams by Marco Bellocchio
- The Unknown Girl by Dardenne brothers
- We Can't Make the Same Mistake Twice by Alanis Obomsawin
- Yourself and Yours by Hong Sang-soo

=== Next Wave ===
- Divines by Houda Benyamina
- The Edge of Seventeen by Kelly Fremon Craig
- Handsome Devil by John Butler
- India in a Day by Richie Mehta
- Layla M. by Mijke de Jong
- Moonlight by Barry Jenkins
- A Wedding by Stephan Streker
- The Wedding Ring by Rahmatou Keïta
- Window Horses by Ann Marie Fleming

=== Documentaries ===
- Abacus: Small Enough to Jail by Steve James
- All Governments Lie: Truth, Deception and the Spirit of I. F. Stone by Fred Peabody
- Amanda Knox by Brian McGinn and Rod Blackhurst
- The B-Side: Elsa Dorfman's Portrait Photography by Errol Morris
- Beauties of the Night by María José Cuevas
- Before the Flood by Fisher Stevens
- Bezness as Usual by Alex Pitstra
- Black Code by Nicholas de Pencier
- Breaking Occupation by Brett Smith
- Chasing Trane: The John Coltrane Documentary by John Scheinfeld
- The Cinema Travellers by Shirley Abraham and Amit Madheshiya
- Citizen Jane: Battle for the City by Matt Tyrnauer
- Forever Pure by Maya Zinshtein
- Gaza Surf Club by Philip Gnadt and Mickey Yamine
- Giants of Africa by Hubert Davis
- Gimme Danger by Jim Jarmusch
- Girl Unbound by Erin Heidenreich
- Gringo: The Dangerous Life of John McAfee by Nanette Burstein
- I Am Not Your Negro by Raoul Peck
- I Called Him Morgan by Kasper Collin
- In Exile by Tin Win Naing
- India in a Day by Richie Mehta
- An Insignificant Man by Khushboo Ranka and Vinay Shukla
- Into the Inferno by Werner Herzog and Clive Oppenheimer
- The Ivory Game by Kief Davidson and Richard Ladkani
- Karl Marx City by Petra Epperlein and Michael Tucker
- Mali Blues by Lutz Gregor
- Mostly Sunny by Dilip Mehta
- Off Frame AKA Revolution Until Victory by Mohanad Yaqubi
- Politics, Instructions Manual by Fernando León de Aranoa
- The River of My Dreams: A Portrait of Gordon Pinsent by Brigitte Berman
- Rodnye by Vitaly Mansky
- The Sixth Beatle by Tony Guma and John Rose
- The Skyjacker's Tale by Jamie Kastner
- The Stairs by Hugh Gibson
- The Terry Kath Experience by Michelle Sinclair
- The War Show by Andreas Dalsgaard and Obaidah Zytoon
- Water and Sugar: Carlo Di Palma, the Colours of Life by Fariborz Kamkari

=== Contemporary World Cinema ===
- A Decent Woman by Lukas Valenta Rinner
- After Love by Joachim Lafosse
- The Animal's Wife by Víctor Gaviria
- Apprentice by Boo Junfeng
- Aquarius by Kleber Mendonça Filho
- Ayiti Mon Amour by Guetty Felin
- Blindness by Ryszard Bugajski
- Boundaries by Chloé Robichaud
- Brooks, Meadows and Lovely Faces by Yousry Nasrallah
- Death in Sarajevo by Danis Tanović
- Ember by Zeki Demirkubuz
- The Fixer by Adrian Sitaru
- Handsome Devil by John Butler
- Heaven Will Wait by Marie-Castille Mention-Schaar
- In Between by Maysaloun Hamoud
- Indivisible by Edoardo De Angelis
- Mahana by Lee Tamahori
- Marie Curie: The Courage of Knowledge by Marie Noëlle
- Mister Universo by Tizza Covi and Rainer Frimmel
- Past Life by Avi Nesher
- Pyromaniac by Erik Skjoldbjærg
- The Rehearsal by Alison Maclean
- The Road to Mandalay by Midi Z
- Santa & Andres by Carlos Lechuga
- Soul on a String by Zhang Yang
- Tamara and the Ladybug by Lucía Carreras
- Clair Obscur by Yeşim Ustaoğlu
- Tramps by Adam Leon
- Vaya by Akin Omotoso
- We Are Never Alone by Petr Vaclav
- The Wedding Ring by Rahmatou Keïta
- White Sun by Deepak Rauniyar
- The Women's Balcony by Emil Ben Shimon
- X500 by Juan Andrés Arango
- Zoology by Ivan I. Tverdovsky

=== Contemporary World Speakers ===
- The Animal's Wife by Víctor Gaviria
- Blindness by Ryszard Bugajski
- In Between by Maysaloun Hamoud
- Mahana by Lee Tamahori
- Past Life by Avi Nesher

=== Vanguard ===
- The Bad Batch by Ana Lily Amirpour
- Blind Sun by Joyce A. Nashawati
- Buster's Mal Heart by Sarah Adina Smith
- Colossal by Nacho Vigalondo
- Godspeed by Chung Mong-hong
- I Am the Pretty Thing That Lives in the House by Oz Perkins
- Interchange by Dain Iskandar Said
- Message from the King by Fabrice Du Welz
- My Entire High School Sinking into the Sea by Dash Shaw
- Nelly by Anne Émond
- Prevenge by Alice Lowe
- The Untamed by Amat Escalante
- Without Name by Lorcan Finnegan

=== Discovery ===
- ARQ by Tony Elliott
- Blessed Benefit by Mahmoud al Massad
- Boys in the Trees by Nicholas Verso
- Divines by Houda Benyamina
- The Empty Box by Claudia Sainte-Luce
- Flemish Heaven by Peter Monsaert
- The Fury of a Patient Man by Raúl Arévalo
- Godless by Ralitza Petrova
- The Giant by Johannes Nyholm
- Guilty Men by Iván D. Gaona
- The Happiest Day in the Life of Olli Mäki by Juho Kuosmanen
- Heartstone by Guðmundur Arnar Guðmundsson
- Hello Destroyer by Kevan Funk
- Hunting Flies by Izer Aliu
- In the Blood by Rasmus Heisterberg
- In the Radiant City by Rachel Lambert
- Jean of the Joneses by Stella Meghie
- Jeffrey by Yanillys Perez
- Jesús by Fernando Guzzoni
- Joe Cinque's Consolation by Sotiris Dounoukos
- Kati Kati by Mbithi Masya
- Katie Says Goodbye by Wayne Roberts
- The Levelling by Hope Dickson Leach
- Little Wing by Selma Vilhunen
- Mad World by Wong Chun
- Marija by Michael Koch
- A Wedding by Stephan Streker
- Old Stone by Johnny Ma
- Park by Sofia Exarchou
- Prank by Vincent Biron
- The Red Turtle by Michaël Dudok de Wit
- Sami Blood by Amanda Kernell
- Sand Storm by Elite Zexer
- Werewolf by Ashley McKenzie
- Wùlu by Daouda Coulibaly

=== Platform ===
- Daguerrotype by Kiyoshi Kurosawa
- Goldstone by Ivan Sen
- Heal the Living by Katell Quillévéré
- Hema Hema: Sing Me a Song While I Wait by Khyentse Norbu
- Home by Fien Troch
- Jackie by Pablo Larraín
- Lady Macbeth by William Oldroyd
- Layla M. by Mijke de Jong
- Searchers by Zacharias Kunuk and Natar Ungalaaq
- Moonlight by Barry Jenkins
- Nocturama by Bertrand Bonello
- Those Who Make Revolution Halfway Only Dig Their Own Graves by Mathieu Denis and Simon Lavoie

=== TIFF Kids ===
- The Day My Father Became a Bush, by Nicole van Kilsdonk
- The Eagle Huntress by Otto Bell
- My Life as a Zucchini by Claude Barras
- Miss Impossible by Emilie Deleuze

=== Short Cuts ===
- 3-Way (Not Calling) by Molly McGlynn
- 5 Films About Technology by Peter Huang
- Andy Goes In by Josh Polon
- Ape Sodom by Maxwell McCabe-Lokos
- Because The World Never Stops by Axel Danielson and Maximilien Van Aertryck
- Black Head Cow by Elizabeth Nichols
- Blind Vaysha by Theodore Ushev
- Cleo by Sanja Živković
- Cul-de-Sac by Damon Russell
- CYCLES by Joe Cobden
- DataMine by Timothy Barron Tracey
- Emma by Martin Edralin
- Four Faces of the Moon by Amanda Strong
- A Funeral for Lightning by Emily Kai Bock
- Gods Acre by Kelton Stepanowich
- Half a Man by Kristina Kumric
- Hand. Line. Cod. by Justin Simms
- The Hedonists by Jian Zhang-ke
- Imitations by Markus Henkel, Milos Mitrovic, Ian Bawa and Fabian Velasco
- Import by Ena Sendijarević
- Inner Workings by Leo Matsuda
- Late Night Drama by Patrice Laliberté
- Mariner by Thyrone Tommy
- Mutants by Alexandre Dostie
- A New Home by Ziga Virc
- Next by Elena Brodach
- Nothing About Moccasins by Eden Mallina Awashish
- Nutag–Homeland by Alisi Telengut
- Oh What a Wonderful Feeling by François Jaros
- On the Origin of Fear by Bayu Prihantoro Filemon
- Plain and Simple by Raphaël Ouellet
- Red of the Yew Tree by Marie-Hélène Turcotte
- The Road to Webequie by Ryan Noth and Tess Girard
- Romantik by Mateusz Rakowicz
- Shahzad by Haya Waseem
- Small Fry by Eva Michon
- The Smoke by Rebecca Addelman
- Snip by Terril Calder
- Standby by Charlotte Regan
- Summer Camp Island by Julia Pott
- The Taste of Vietnam by Pier-Luc Latulippe
- TMG_103 (rough cut) by Walter Woodman
- Transition by Milica Tomovic
- Tshiuetin by Caroline Monnet
- Twisted by Jay Cheel
- Whispering Breeze by Jonathan Tremblay
- Wild Skin by Ariane Louis-Seize
- Your Mother and I by Anna Maguire

=== Festival Street ===
- Ferris Bueller's Day Off by John Hughes
- Labyrinth by Jim Henson
- The Man Trap by Marc Daniels

=== Primetime ===
- Black Mirror by Charlie Brooker
- Nirvanna the Band the Show by Matt Johnson and Jay McCarrol
- Transparent by Joey Soloway
- Tuko Macho by The Nest Collective and Jim Chuchu
- Wasteland by Štěpán Hulík

=== Public Programme ===
- Ferris Bueller's Day Off by John Hughes

=== Cinematheque ===
- The Battle of Algiers by Gillo Pontecorvo
- A Cool Sound from Hell by Sidney J. Furie
- Daughters of the Dust by Julie Dash
- General Report on Certain Matters of Interest For a Public Screening by Pere Portabella
- The Horse Thief by Tian Zhuangzhuang
- Lumière! by Auguste and Louis Lumière and Thierry Frémaux
- One Sings, the Other Doesn't by Agnès Varda
- One-Eyed Jacks by Marlon Brando
- Pan's Labyrinth by Guillermo del Toro
- Something Wild by Jonathan Demme

=== City to City: Lagos ===
- '76 by Izu Ojukwu
- 93 Days by Steve Gukas
- The Arbitration by Niyi Akinmolayan
- Green White Green by Abba Makama
- Just Not Married by Uduak-Obong Patrick
- Okafor's Law by Omoni Oboli
- Taxi Driver by Daniel Emeke Oriahi
- The Wedding Party by Kemi Adetiba

=== Wavelengths ===
- 025 Sunset Red by Laida Lertxundi
- 350 MYA by Terra Long
- As Without So Within by Manuela de Laborde
- Austerlitz by Sergei Loznitsa
- An Aviation Field by Joana Pimenta
- Ayhan and Me by Belit Sag
- Burning Mountains that Spew Flame by Helena Girón and Samuel M. Delgado
- By the Time It Gets Dark by Anocha Suwichakornpong
- Children of Lir by Katherin McInnis
- Cilaos by Camilo Restrepo
- Dark Adaptation by Chris Gehman
- The Death of Louis XIV by Albert Serra
- The Dreamed Ones by Ruth Beckermann
- The Dreamed Path by Angela Schanelec
- Ears, Nose and Throat by Kevin Jerome Everson
- Flowers of the Sky by Janie Geiser
- Foyer by Ismaïl Bahri
- General Report II: The New Abduction of Europe by Pere Portabella
- Hermia & Helena by Matías Piñeiro
- The Human Surge by Eduardo Williams
- Há Terra! by Ana Vaz
- I Had to Nowhere to Go by Douglas Gordon
- I'll Remember You As You Were, Not As What You'll Become by Sky Hopinka
- Incantati by Danièle Huillet and Jean-Marie Straub
- Indefinite Pitch by James N. Kienitz Wilkins
- Kékszakállú by Gastón Solnicki
- Luna e Santur by Joshua Gen Solondz
- Mimosas by Oliver Laxe
- Nightlife by Cyprien Gaillard
- The Ornithologist by João Pedro Rodrigues
- Rudzienko by Sharon Lockhart
- Singularity by Albert Serra
- Strange Vision of Seeing Things by Ryan Ferko
- Ta'ang by Wang Bing
- Ten Mornings Ten Evenings and One Horizon by Tomonari Nishikawa
- Untitled by Björn Kämmerer
- Untitled, 1925 by Madi Piller
- Venus Delta by Antoinette Zwirchmayr
- The Watershow Extravaganza by Sophie Michael
- What's New by Nina Könnemann
- The Woman Who Left by Lav Diaz

== Canada's Top Ten ==
In December, TIFF programmers released their annual Canada's Top Ten list of the films selected as the ten best Canadian films of 2016. The selected films received a follow-up screening at the TIFF Bell Lightbox as a "Canada's Top Ten" minifestival in January 2017, as well as in selected other cities including Vancouver, Calgary, Edmonton, Regina, Saskatoon, Winnipeg, Ottawa, Montreal and Halifax.

=== Features ===
- Angry Inuk by Alethea Arnaquq-Baril
- Hello Destroyer by Kevan Funk
- It's Only the End of the World (Juste la fin du monde) by Xavier Dolan
- Mean Dreams by Nathan Morlando
- Nelly by Anne Émond
- Old Stone by Johnny Ma
- Searchers (Maliglutit) by Zacharias Kunuk and Natar Ungalaaq
- Those Who Make Revolution Halfway Only Dig Their Own Graves (Ceux qui font les révolutions à moitié n'ont fait que se creuser un tombeau) by Mathieu Denis and Simon Lavoie
- Werewolf by Ashley McKenzie
- Window Horses by Ann Marie Fleming

=== Short films ===
- Blind Vaysha by Theodore Ushev
- Emma by Martin Edralin
- Fish by Heather Young
- Fluffy by Lee Filipovski
- Frame 394 by Rich Williamson
- A Funeral for Lightning by Emily Kai Bock
- Her Friend Adam by Ben Petrie
- Mariner by Thyrone Tommy
- Mutants by Alexandre Dostie
- Snip by Terril Calder
