= Michelle Sound =

Multidisciplinary Cree and Metis artist

- Born: 1977 (age 48–49); Vancouver, British Columbia
- Education: Simon Fraser University, Emily Carr University of Art and Design
- Known for: painting, photography, Indigenous material practices
- Website: https://www.michellesound.art

Michelle Sound is a multidisciplinary Cree and Métis artist, educator and mother, living and working in Vancouver, British Columbia, Canada. Using a wide range of mediums—including photography, painting, textile art, beadwork, drum making, and caribou hair tufting—Sound's works often explore her Cree and Métis identity from a personal experience rooted in place, family, and history. Utilizing both traditional and contemporary materials and techniques, she considers notions of maternal labour, and cultural knowledge and inheritances, while highlighting that acts of care and joy are situated in family and community.

== Early life and education ==
Sound was born and raised on the unceded and ancestral home territories of the xwmƏƟkwƏýƏm (Musqueam), Skwxwú7mesh (Squamish) and SƏĺílwƏtaʔ/Selilwitulh (Tsleil-Waututh) Nations to a Cree mother from Kinuso, Alberta, Treaty 8 territory and a Métis father from the Buffalo Lake Métis Settlement in central Alberta, and is a member of Wapsewsipi Swan River First Nation in Northern Alberta. She received a Bachelor of Fine Arts from Simon Fraser University's School for the Contemporary Arts in 2005 and a Master of Applied Arts from Emily Carr University of Art and Design in 2011.

== Career ==
Sound has shown extensively in across Canada in solo, two-person, and group exhibitions. Her work is represented in numerous collections, such as the Burnaby Art Gallery and the Forge Project Collection in New York. It has also been featured on album and book covers, including the work Kinuso on the Scotiabank Giller Prize finalist novel A Minor Chorus by Billy-Ray Belcourt. She has created a variety of public artworks, such as a painted mural in Ottawa as part of the nākateyimisowin/Taking Care of Oneself exhibition curated by Joi Arcand, an installation at a Telus Transit Station in Edmonton, street banners in the city of New Westminster, and utility box art wraps in Vancouver. Sound has facilitated numerous public workshops, including a watercolours and mark-making open studio at Vancouver's Contemporary Art Gallery and a beading and caribou-hair tufting workshop at the Richmond Art Gallery, and has held residencies at the Burrard Arts Foundation, Deer Lake, and the Wedge Artist Residency. Sound was a Salt Spring National Art Award Finalist in 2021. In addition to her art practice, Sounds also works as an Indigenous Advisor at Douglas College and was previously the Aboriginal Program Assistant at Emily Carr University of Art and Design.

== Selected works ==
- Trapline - Capan Snares Rabbits is an early series of delicate pastel-coloured rabbit fur drums that reflect on and pay tribute to the hard work and care of Sound's grandmothers as they trapped and snared rabbits and kept these land-based practices alive in order to provide for their families.
- nimama hates fish but worked in the cannery is a series of photographs of the artist, against the background of the west coast, holding up archival images of her family in Alberta. In this work, Sounds considers Indigenous histories of enfranchisement, displacement, and loss of language, while honouring the sacrifices of past generations and the role that stories had in maintaining familial connections.

== Selected exhibitions ==
Sound has shown work in numerous solo and group exhibitions, including Otherwise Disregarded at Audain Art Museum in Whistler (2024), Smokes, Sings Loud at grunt gallery (2022), nimama is a tough cookie at Neutral Ground in Regina (2022), okâwisimâk nawac kwayask itôtamwak/Aunties do it better at daphne in Montreal (2022), Moving Throughlines at Seymour Art Gallery in North Vancouver (2020), and Winter Pandemic in SoLA Contemporary in Los Angeles (2020).
