= Searchers (film) =

- Film poster
- Maliglutit ᒪᓕᒡᓗᑎᑦ
- Directed by: Zacharias Kunuk; Natar Ungalaaq
- Written by: Zacharias Kunuk; Norman Cohn
- Produced by: Jonathan Frantz; Zacharias Kunuk; Cara Di Staulo
- Starring: Benjamin Kunuk; Jocelyne Immaroitok; Karen Ivalu; Lucy Tulugarjuk
- Cinematography: Jonathan Frantz
- Edited by: Norman Cohn; Zacharias Kunuk
- Music by: Chris Crilly; Tanya Tagaq
- Production company: Kinguliit Productions
- Distributed by: Isuma
- Release date: September 2016 (Toronto)
- Running time: 94 minutes
- Country: Canada
- Language: Inuktitut
- Budget: $1.2 million

Searchers (Inuktitut: ᒪᓕᒡᓗᑎᑦ, romanized: Maliglutit) is a 2016 Inuktitut-language Canadian drama film directed by Zacharias Kunuk and Natar Ungalaaq, which premiered at the Toronto International Film Festival. Based in part on the 1956 John Ford film The Searchers, the film is set in Northern Canada in 1913. It centres on Kuanana (Benjamin Kunuk), a man who returns from hunting to discover that much of his family has been killed and his wife and daughter have been kidnapped.

The film was shot in Nunavut with an entirely Inuit cast, and with contributions from a local crew. The production was troubled by extreme cold. It has received positive reviews in Canada, and was nominated for two Canadian Screen Awards, including Best Motion Picture.

== Plot ==
In an Inuit community, elders take note that four men, leader Kupak and followers Aulla, Tulimaaq and Timauti, are guilty of murder, lechery and not sharing food. Consequently, they are exiled from the band and left to wander the Arctic landscape. In a nearby community, Kuanana and his wife Ailla are raising children and living in their extended family. Kuanana sets out to hunt for caribou, with the elder instructing him to take the young Siku as his hunting partner, though Kuanana's son Angutii also wishes to go. While they are absent, Kupak and Aulla, longing for women, ambush Kuanana's igloo, abducting Ailla and her daughter. Kuanana and Siku return to the igloo, and Kuanana is shocked to see it in ruins, and Angutii murdered. The elder, mortally wounded, tells Kuanana that men kidnapped Ailla and her daughter, and gives him a totem to summon a spirit guide, Kallulik, the loon. The elder then dies.

Kuanana calls for Kallulik's help and hears the loon cry, revealing the direction his wife and daughter were taken. Kallulik and Siku set out with sled dogs and a telescope. While Ailla and her daughter resist their captors and rapists, and attempt to escape, Kupak and Aulla continue to hold them captive. Feeling a low tone in his ear, Kupak takes the ailment as a bad omen and orders Tulimaaq to see if they are being followed. Kuanana spots them by telescope, and Tulimaaq also sees Kuanana is in pursuit.

Armed with a rifle, Kuanana decides he and Siku will split up, assuring Siku that he can take a passage himself. Kuanana discovers his daughter, tied up alone, and unties her and tells her to hide behind the nearby ridge; she also tips him off as to Ailla's whereabouts. Tulimaaq and Timauti are dispatched. Siku is attacked by Aulla, but coming from behind, Kuanana shoots Aulla and saves Siku. Kuanana then tells Siku to rescue his sister behind the ridge, while Kuanana himself searches for Ailla. Out of bullets, Kuanana is attacked by Kupak; they fight by hand until Ailla emerges from behind, stabbing and killing Kupak. The family is reunited.

== Cast ==
- Benjamin Kunuk as Kuanana
- Karen Ivalu as Tagaq
- Jonah Qunaq as Aulla
- Joey Sarpinak as Kupak
- Jocelyne Immaroitok as Ailla
- Joseph Uttak as Siku

== Production ==
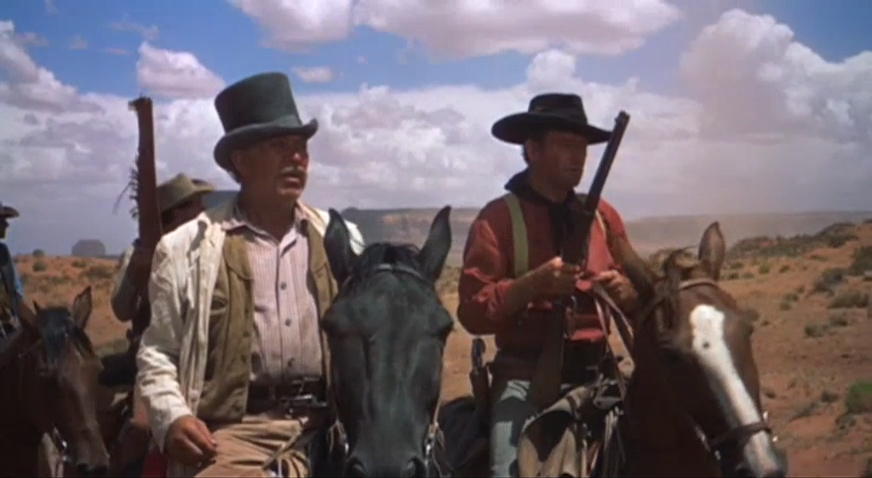
Ward Bond and John Wayne in The Searchers, which inspired Maliglutit.

The story is inspired by the 1956 John Ford film The Searchers, although co-director Zacharias Kunuk discarded the original's plot about conflicts between white people and indigenous peoples, instead using only Inuit characters. Kunuk explained racism was not an intended theme of the film, though given the time setting, the Inuit would have some items received from white people, as there were trading posts then. Kunuk said he watched western films in the Igloolik community hall as a boy, and declared The Searchers star John Wayne "was our hero." However, he said his perception of Wayne became more complicated as he learned more about him.

Actor Natar Ungalaaq made his directorial debut with this film, along with Kunuk, who directed him in the 2001 film Atanarjuat: The Fast Runner. Kunuk, Ungalaaq and past colleague Norman Cohn collaboratively developed the screenplay from 17 to 100 pages. As part of an initiative to discover and train new actors in the small community of Igloolik, Nunavut, and to have an entirely Inuit cast, Jocelyne Immaroitok, Johan Qunaq, Karen Ivalu were cast and mentored by Ungaalaq. Experienced actress Lucy Tulugarjuk also starred, and coached the novice performers.

Produced by Kinguliit Productions on a budget of $1.2 million, the film was shot near Igloolik, with the crew travelling to a nearby sea in March 2015 to film. Kunuk claimed it was the coldest weather he had experienced making a film, and that the frostbite on the actors visible in the film is real. Kunuk also said the camera equipment had to be covered in sheepskin to remain operational. He found the extreme and unusual temperatures of −47 °C (−53 °F) and −48 °C (−54 °F), due to climate change, to be the most difficult part of production. Filming inside igloos was somewhat easier, as temperatures within were approximately −20 °C (−4 °F). Sixty local people were employed to build igloos, inform the crew on archaic Inuktitut words, make the costumes and prepare food. Elders particularly knew about the fashions.

== Release ==
The film premiered at the Toronto International Film Festival in September 2016. It also screened at the Vancouver International Film Festival in October 2016, and the Miami International Film Festival in March 2017.

From the TIFF circuit, the film opened in Toronto, Vancouver and Calgary on 13 January 2017. It opened in Regina, Saskatchewan, Edmonton and Montreal between 19 and 26 January, with a wider release scheduled for May.

== Reception ==
=== Critical reception ===
On 7 December 2016, the film was named to the Toronto International Film Festival's annual Canada's Top 10 list. Writing for The Globe and Mail, Kate Taylor gave the film three stars, crediting Kunuk with combining "an archetypal tale of revenge with an almost documentary examination of pre-modern life in the Arctic." However, she said it was not as good as his film Atanarjuat: The Fast Runner. In The Toronto Star, Peter Howell gave it three and a half stars, wrote that like The Searchers, Maliglutit portrays "the most naked of emotions, played out over an unforgiving frontier."

In The National Post, Chris Knight awarded the film three stars, saying it illustrated Inuit customs and had comparable cinematography to The Searchers, classifying it as "a northern" in contrast to westerns. Norman Wilner, for NOW Toronto, praised the film for "ingenious" storytelling.

=== Accolades ===
Kunuk's nominations for Maliglutit were noted as among the various nominations for Aboriginal artists at the 5th Canadian Screen Awards. Algonquin Caroline Monnet was also nominated in the short documentary category for Tshiuetin, and numerous native actors were nominated.

Award	Date of ceremony	Category	Recipient(s)	Result	Ref(s)
Canadian Screen Awards	12 March 2017	Best Motion Picture	Zacharias Kunuk	Nominated	
Canadian Screen Awards	12 March 2017	Best Original Screenplay	Zacharias Kunuk	Nominated	
ImagineNATIVE Film + Media Arts Festival	22 October 2016	Best Indigenous Language Production	Zacharias Kunuk and Natar Ungalaaq	Won	
