= Skawennati =

First Nations artist

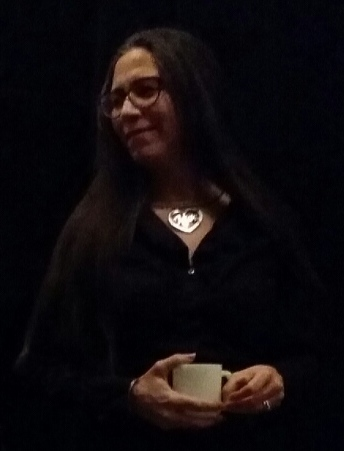
- Skawennati
- Education: Concordia University
- Known for: New Media artist
- Awards: imagineNATIVE Best New Media (2009) Eiteljorg Contemporary Art Fellow (2011)
- Website: www.skawennati.com

Skawennati is a First Nations (Kahnawakeronon) multimedia artist, best known for her online works as well as Machinima that explore contemporary Indigenous cultures, and what Indigenous life might look like in futures inspired by science fiction. She served as the 2019 Indigenous Knowledge Holder at McGill University. In 2011, she was awarded an Eiteljorg Contemporary Art Fellowship which recognized her as one of "the best and most relevant native artists."

Skawennati is the co-founder of Nation to Nation and Co-Director with Jason Edward Lewis of Aboriginal Territories in Cyberspace, AbTeC, a research network of artists and academics who investigate and create Indigenous virtual environments. AbTeC, whose goal is to ensure Indigenous presence in the web pages, online environments, video games and virtual worlds that comprise cyberspace, is based at the Milieux Institute for Arts, Culture and Technology at Concordia University in Montreal, Quebec.

She is one of the co-founders of daphne, the first Indigenous artist-run centre in Québec, along with Caroline Monnet, Hannah Claus, and Nadia Myre.

== Early life and education ==
Skawennati, Skawennati Tricia Fragnito, was born in Kahnawake Mohawk reserve in Quebec, home to a sizeable concentration of Mohawk artists and curators. She grew up in the suburb of Châteauguay. In 1992, she earned a BFA in Design Arts and in 1995, a Graduate Diploma of Institutional Administration (Arts Specialization) at Concordia University in Montreal, Quebec. Her first position after graduation was with OBORO Artist-Run Centre in Montreal.

== Work ==
Through New Media forms, Skawennati addresses history, the future, and change, particularly as they relate to First Nations and Indigenous cultures. In an interview for the exhibition Changing Hands: Art Without Reservation 3 at Museum of Arts and Design, New York, Skawennati states "that there are plenty images of us in the past. Often in those images often we are silent, we are unnamed and I wanted to show something us else. I wanted us to be able to imagine ourselves in the future."

Skawennati is one of the first recipients of the First People's Curatorial Residency grant, established in 1997 by the Canada Council for the Arts. In 2000, she created Imagining Indians in the 25th Century for I. Witness curated by Catherine Crowston at the Edmonton Art Gallery.

=== CyberPowWow ===
Skawennati's first major online project was CyberPowWow, an online gathering that occurred several times between 1997 and 2004. It was usually hosted through galleries such as the Walter Phillips Gallery and arts institutions such as the Banff Centre. The central thrust of CyberPowerWow was to create an aboriginal territory in cyberspace. CyberPowWow — a chat room functioning as an interactive digital art gallery, allowing people to form communities both online and in real life—provided "a means for indigenous artists and storytellers to secure footing in the digital urban." Skawennati worked with Indigenous artists and writers who customized the space with images, scripts, and Indigenous avatars.

In 2011, she was awarded an Eiteljorg Contemporary Art Fellowship which recognized her as one of "the best and most relevant native artists."

=== TimeTraveller™ ===
Her Machinima series TimeTraveller™ has episodes on the death of Mohawk saint Kateri Tekakwitha, the Dakota Sioux Uprising of 1862, the 1990 Oka Crisis, and other watershed events in Indigenous history. This multiplatform work "resist[s] pan-Indian and neo-luddite stereotypes of First Nations peoples." Furthermore, it seeks to highlight the "misinterpretation and abuse of Indigenous art and people."

=== She Falls for Ages ===
Part of the 2017 solo exhibition Tomorrow People, She Falls for Ages retells a Haudenosaunee creation story using sci-fi, the virtual world and a feminist lens. Her version included a futuristic aesthetic and bright colours, created using the Second Life program as a medium.

== Selected exhibitions ==
- Storybook Story. Art Gallery of Calgary (2001)
- Rashid & Rosetta. Co-presented by Oboro and Studio XX, Montreal (2009)
- Rashid & Rosetta 2. HTMlles Festival, Montreal (2010)
- Close Encounters: The Next 500 Years. Plug In Institute for Contemporary Art, Winnipeg, MB (2011)
- We Are Here! Eiteljorg Contemporary Art Fellowship. Smithsonian National Museum of the American Indian, New York (2012)
- Ghost Dance: Resistance. Activism. Art. Ryerson Image Centre, Toronto (2013)
- TimeTraveller™. Niagara Artists Centre (2014)
- Avant Canada. Brock University (2014)
- Memories of the Future. SAW Gallery, Ottawa (2015)
- Now? Now!. Biennale of the Americas, Museum of Contemporary Art, Denver, Colorado (2015)
- Tomorrow People. Oboro, Montreal (2017)
- Skawennati: For the Ages. V Tape, Toronto (2017)
- Teiakwanahstahsontéhrha’ | We Extend the Rafters. VOX, Centre de l'image contemporaine, Montreal (2017)
- Owerà:ke Non Aié:nahna | Filling in the Blank Spaces. Leonard & Bina Ellen Art Gallery, Concordia University, Montreal (2017)
- On Desire. B3 Biennial of the Moving Image, Frankfurt, Germany (2017)
- From Skyworld to Cyberspace. McIntosh Gallery, University of Western Ontario, London, Ontario (2019)
- Game Changers: Video Games and Contemporary Art, MassArt Art Museum, Boston, Massachusetts (2020)
- Radical Stitch, MacKenzie Art Gallery (2022).
- Skawennati: Welcome to the Dreamhouse, National Gallery of Canada (2025)

== Curatorial Work ==
- Owerà:ke Non Aié:nahne / Combler les espaces vides / Filling in the Blank Spaces. Leonard and Bina Ellen Art Gallery, Concordia University, Montreal (2017).

== Awards ==
She is a multiple award winner, particularly for her project TimeTraveller™, a nine episode Machinima series that used science fiction to examine First Nations histories. In 2009, she was awarded Best New Media winner at ImagineNATIVE for TimeTraveller™.

In 2011, Skawennati was a 2011 Eiteljorg Contemporary Art Fellow and in 2013 was again a Best New Media winner, this time with the AbTeC collective for Skahiòn:haiti – Rise of the Kanien’kenhá:ka Legends.

In 2015 she represented Canada at the Biennial of the Americas.

In 2020, she was awarded a Smithsonian Artist Research Fellowship.
