= Bernard Bloch =

Bernard Bloch refers to:

- Bernard Bloch (linguist) (1907–1965), American linguist
- Bernard Bloch (actor) (born 1949), French actor
