= Paul-André Brasseur =

Canadian actor(born 1994)

- Born: August 25, 1994 (age 32); Montreal, Quebec, Canada
- Occupation: Actor

Paul-André Brasseur (born August 25, 1994) is a Canadian actor of partly Inuit ancestry.

When he starred in the 2008 film The Necessities of Life, he lived in Montreal and spoke French, so he learned his Inuktitut lines with the aid of co-star Natar Ungalaaq.

== Filmography ==
- The Necessities of Life (Ce qu'il faut pour vivre) (2008)
