= Swan River First Nation =

First Nation government in Canada

- Band No. 457
- ᐚᐱᓯᐤ ᓰᐱᐩ wâpisiw-sîpiy
- People: Woodland Cree
- Treaty: Treaty 8
- Headquarters: Kinuso
- Province: Alberta

Land
- Main reserve: Swan River 150E
- Reserve: Assineau River 150F
- Land area: 43.427 km^{2} (16.767 sq mi)

Population (2019)
- On reserve: 425
- Off reserve: 1025
- Total population: 1450

Government
- Chief: Lee Twinn

Tribal Council
- Lesser Slave Lake Indian Regional Council

Website
- Swan River First Nation

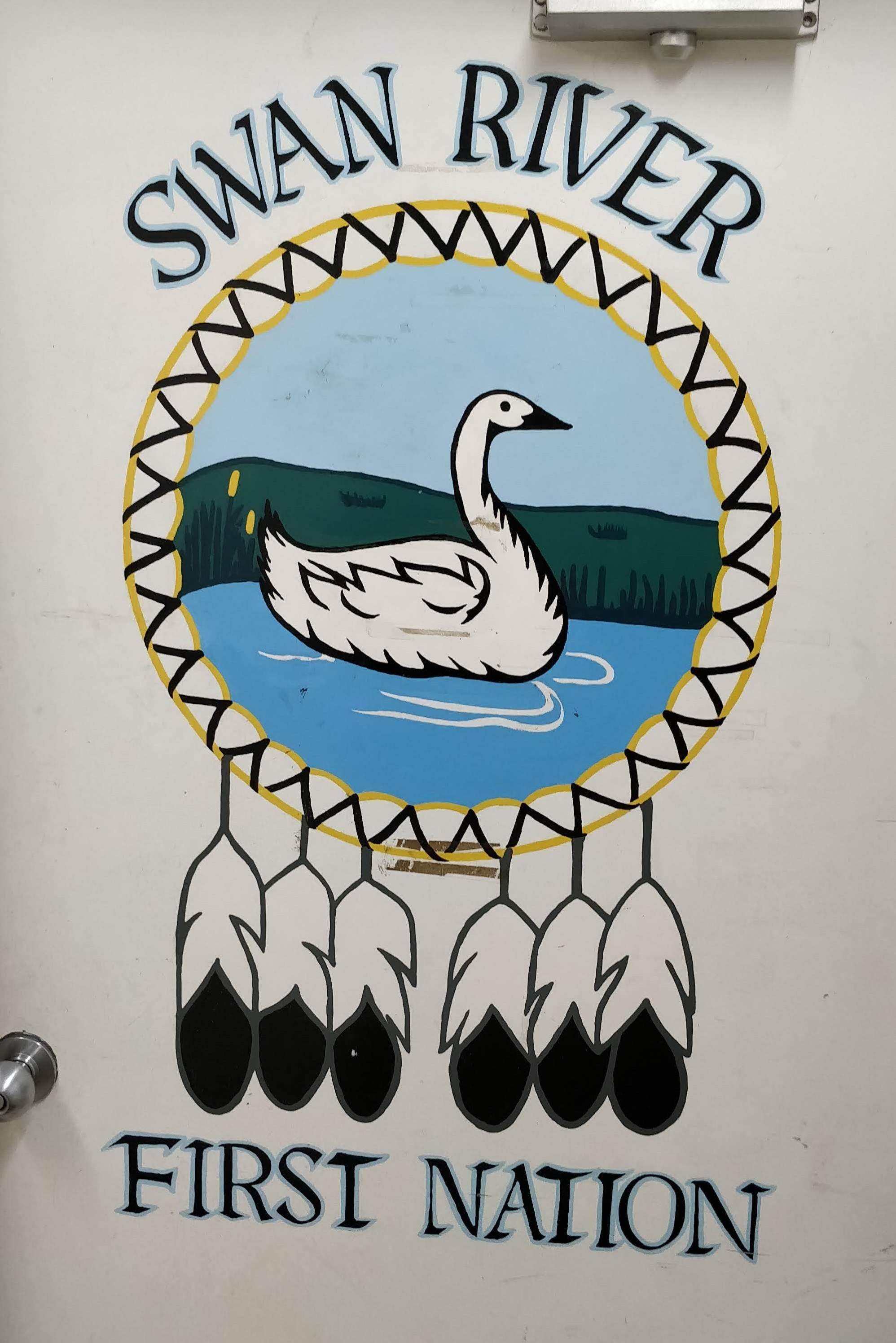
Emblem of the Swan River First Nation

The Swan River First Nation (Cree: ᐚᐱᓯᐤ ᓰᐱᐩ, wâpisiw-sîpiy) is a Woodland Cree First Nations band government in northern Alberta. Located on the south-central shore of Lesser Slave Lake near Kinuso, it controls two Indian reserves, Swan River 150E and Assineau River 150F.

Swan River is one of the original signatories to Treaty 8 in 1899.

== History ==
Swan River First Nation was one of five Woodland Cree communities around Lesser Slave Lake that together composed a regional band.

On January 1, 1890, a majority of the Lesser Slave Lake Cree communities were in favor of Treaty. The RCMP first came to the area by 1897, and by 1899, Treaty 8 was signed on the shore of Lesser Slave Lake by Kinosayo (Andrew Willier) of Driftpile FN, Moostoos of Sucker Creek FN, Weecheewaysis, Charles Nesootasis, and Felix Giroux.

=== Chiefs ===
Unlike southern bands, First Nations communities around Lesser Slave Lake did not have chiefs.

Out of necessity for Treaty negotiations, people from all five bands selected Kinosayo as the chief of the Lesser Slave Lake Bands in 1899, and he would serve until his death in 1918 from the spanish flu. Each community also had an elected headman responsible to the chief.

Kinosayo was replaced by his brother Astatchikun (Felix Willer), who served as chief until his death in 1936.

In 1910, for the sake of administrative convenience, the pay list of "Kinosayo’s Band" was divided into different groups, though they were still all recognized as one band. In 1929, the federal Department of Indian Affairs decided to recognize the four groups as separate bands, and in 1936, the four major bands each elected a separate chief and council to replace the overall council formerly headed by Chief Astatchikun.

=== Leadership ===
Headmen of Swan River First Nation:

- Felix Giroux (Upschinese), 1899-1927
- Edward Nesootasis (Twin), 1927-1928
- August Chalifoux, 1928-1935
- August Sowan (Sound), 1935-1936

Chiefs of Swan River First Nation, in chronological order:

- August Sowan (Sound) (first chief)
- Gene Giroux (Davis)
- August Chalifoux
- Victor Twin
- Paul Sound
- Gordon Courtoreille
- Charlie Chalifoux
- Dustin "Dusty" Twin Sr.
- Richard Davis
- Leon Chalifoux
- Ryan Davis
- Gerald Giroux
- Lee Twinn (current chief)
