= Nadia Myre =

First Nations artist from Quebec (born 1974)

Nadia Myre RCA
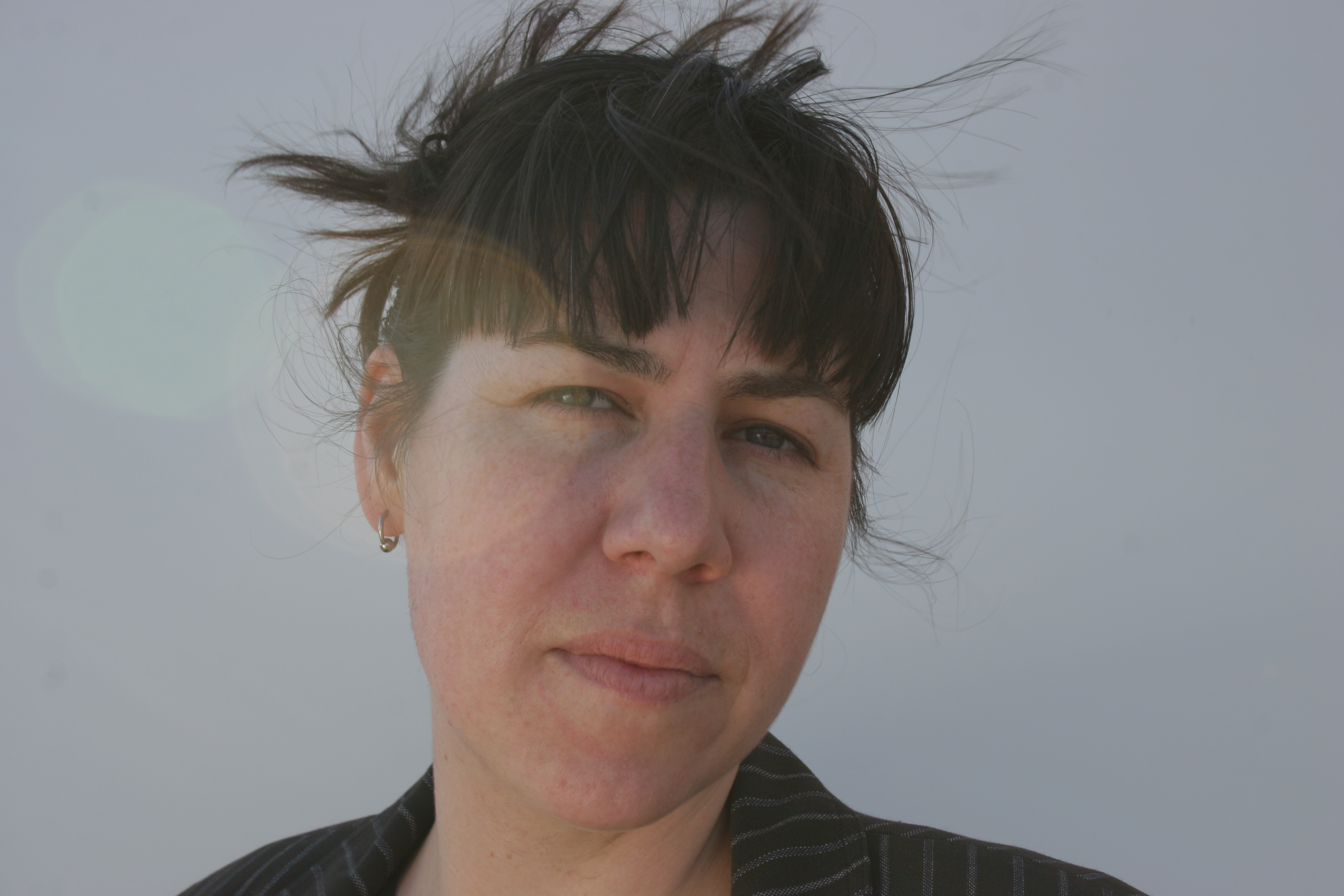
- Born: 1974 (age 51–52); Montreal, Quebec, Canada
- Citizenship: Kitigan Zibi Anishinabeg First Nation and Canadian
- Education: Camosun College; Emily Carr University of Art and Design; Concordia University
- Awards: Sobey Art Award; 2014
- Website: nadiamyre.net

Nadia Myre RCA (born 1974) is a contemporary visual artist from Quebec and an Algonquin member of the Kitigan Zibi Anishinaabeg First Nation, who lives and works in Montreal. For over a decade, her multi-disciplinary practice has been inspired by participant involvement as well as recurring themes of identity, language, longing and loss. Of the artist, Canadian Art Magazine writes, "Nadia Myre's work weaves together complex histories of Aboriginal identity, nationhood, memory and handicraft, using beadwork techniques to craft exquisite and laborious works."

Myre is one of the co-founders of daphne, the first Indigenous artist-run centre in Québec, along with Skawennati, Caroline Monnet, and Hannah Claus.

== Education ==
Myre graduated from Camosun College (1995), completing a Fine Art associate degree. She graduated from Emily Carr University of Art and Design (1997), completing a Bachelor of Fine Arts (BFA). She earned her Master of Fine Arts (MFA) from Concordia University (2002).

== Works and exhibitions ==
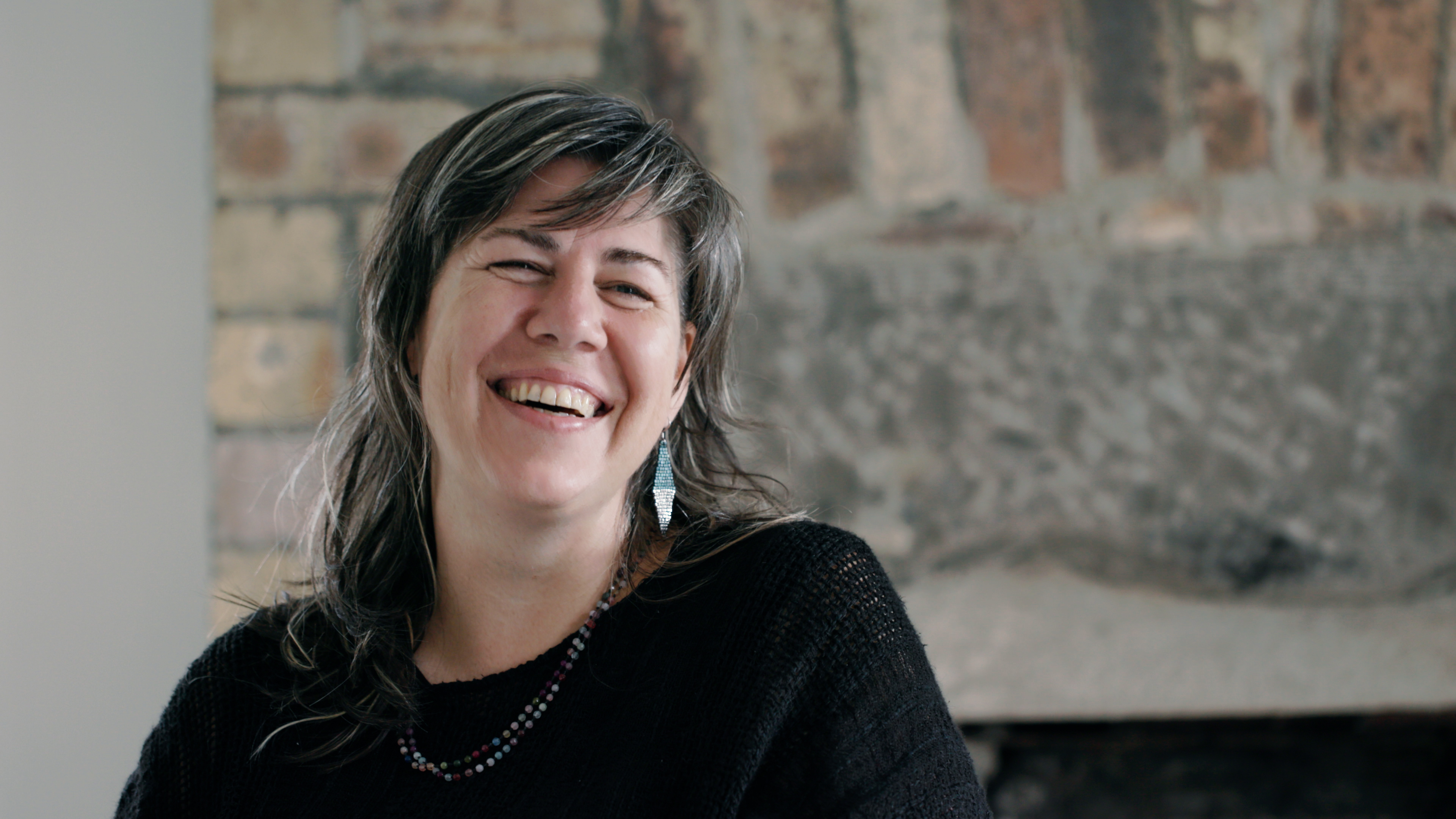
(Video Still). Interview of artist Nadia Myre speaking about her exhibition and commission Edinburgh Printmakers and Edinburgh Art Festival 2022

She has been the subject of numerous solo exhibitions including, "Cont[r]act" at OBORO, Montréal (2002), "Skin Tissue" at the National Museum of American Indian, New York (2010), Tout ce que reste - Scattered Remains at Musée des beaux-arts de Montréal/The Montreal Museum of Fine Arts (2018), "Nadia Myre: Waves of Want" at the National Gallery of Canada (2025). Myre has also participated in many notable group shows including; "The American West" at Compton Verny Gallery, London, United Kingdom; "All Our Relations" for the 2012 Sydney Biennale, Cockatoo Island, Sydney, Australia; and "Social Factory" for the Shanghai Biennale, Shanghai, China.

A trilogy of works by Myre were commissioned for Pimisi station of the Ottawa O-Train: Pimisi/eel, woven basket, and birch forest fence. They were unveiled in 2019.

=== "Indian Act" ===
Inspired by her mother's own story of reclaiming her Native Status, Myre created "Indian Act," in reference to Canada's federal Indian Act of 1876. The piece uses beadwork to recreate all 56 pages of the statute. With red beads representing the negative space of the page, and white beads representing the typed words, the piece creates a visual which Canadian Art called "immensely successful." The final work "reappropriated and denounced this artifact of colonialism." The work also has a strong collaborative element, as Myre enlisted the help of over 200 people to aid in the completion of the beadwork. Beadwork was more traditionally regarded as a women's art form, but Myre invited men, non-Aboriginal, and others to contribute. The piece was part of the 2002 exhibition "Cont[r]act." It was also featured in the book "Sakahàn: International Indigenous Art."

=== The Scar Project ===
In 2004, Myre started The Scar Project. Begun as a personal exploration of her own scars, the project grew into a cooperative endeavor. She organized workshops for people to create their own scar canvases and write their personal stories. Participants are invited to sew their 'scars', metaphorical or literal, onto piece of 10″ square canvas and share the story of how they were hurt, by whom, and who they hurt and how. The Scar Project includes contributions by more than 1,400 people from Canada, the United States and Australia gathered over eight years.

=== "Portrait in Motion" ===
In a video (2002, mini DV transferred to DVD), Myre can be seen paddling a canoe on a lake. The video has been described as “elusive, metaphorical union of past, present, nature, culture and soul” and "appropriates the stereotype of the Indian living in harmony with nature and lets a woman emerge from the mist, in total control of her boat, of her life".

== Awards and recognition ==
Myre is a recipient of numerous awards. She is a recipient of Prix Louis-Comtois (2021), the Compagne des arts et des lettres du Québec (2019), the Banff Centre for Arts Walter Phillips Gallery Indigenous Commission Award (2016), and the Sobey Art Award (2014), Canada's largest award for young artists. She was also nominated for the award in 2011, 2012 and 2013. Myre is also the recipient of the Pratt & Whitney Canada's Les Elles de l'art for the Conseil des arts de Montréal (2011), Quebec Arts Council's "Prix à la création artistique pour la region des Laurentides" (2009), and a Fellowship from the Eiteljorg Museum (2003).

She has received accolades from the New York Times, Le Monde, The Washington Post, Le Devoir, and has been featured in ARTnews, American Craft Magazine, ETC, Parachute, Canadian Art, C Magazine, Monopol, and ESSE.

In 2012, she became a member of the Royal Canadian Academy of Arts.

In 2025, she was the recipient of the Prix Paul-Émile-Borduas.
