= Olé Olé Olé!: A Trip Across Latin America =

2016 film by Paul Dugdale

- Official film poster
- Directed by: Paul Dugdale
- Produced by: Mick Jagger; Sam Bridger; Keith Richards; Charlie Watts; Ronnie Wood; Julie Jakobek
- Cinematography: Jonas Mortensen
- Edited by: Christopher Bird; Richard Denbigh (assistant editor); Richard Dudley (on-line editor); Thomas Faulkner (edit assistant); Peter Lynch (colorist)
- Music by: The Rolling Stones
- Production company: Eagle Rock Entertainment
- Distributed by: Eagle Rock Entertainment
- Release dates: 12 December 2016 (Premiere); 26 May 2017 (DVD/Blu-Ray)
- Running time: 105 minutes
- Country: United States
- Language: English

Olé Olé Olé!: A Trip Across Latin America is a documentary produced by the Rolling Stones that documents their Latin America tour in 2016. Olé premiered on 16 September 2016 at the Toronto International Film Festival. The initial trailer for the film was uploaded on the band's official YouTube channel 7 September 2016, with a United States trailer released 10 November 2016. The documentary was released on DVD and Blu-Ray 26 May 2017. Both Olé Olé Olé!: A Trip Across Latin America and the related Stones' concert film Havana Moon were directed by Paul Dugdale.

Ole – part concert film and part travelogue – records the latest historic moment in the career of the band, following the Stones throughout their Latin America tour before culminating in Havana. Two songs from the Havana concert, which would come to be the subject of the Stones concert film Havana Moon, were played in their entirety. The film is provided with a natural throughline by the saga which went into making the concert possible.

The film also focuses largely on the Stones' time in Argentina – a place where Stones fans comprise a "Deadhead-esque urban tribe of hardcore devotees and Stones-inspired bands called “rolingas”. The subculture of the rolingas was born out of ban on English music imposed by the previous military dictatorship. The film also contains interviews with partying and busking "lips-and-tongue-clad rockers" during their time in Buenos Aires. Ole captures the frenzy generated by the band as their motorcade travels to a venue, which reminds viewers of the early days of the band being pursued by screaming fans – although Variety notes that the "screaming girls" have been replaced by older men.

After the band's motorcade passes the group gathered along the streets, a cameraman captures an Argentinian man weeping at the side of the road, to which the man's wife explains “He just saw Mick.”

== Reception ==
=== Debut ===
Olé premiered on 16 September 2016 at the Toronto International Film Festival. The television premiere of the film was on 14 October 2016 on the Canadian subscription service, CraveTV. It was later broadcast at an unknown date on CTV and on 15 January 2017 it was broadcast on Starz in the United States.

=== Reception ===
Rolling Stone praised the film, stating that "there's a lot to recommend". The New York Times stated that the film was "less a concert film or travelogue than a historical account" that was "swiftly, smartly assembled, reflecting events only six months old". Variety complimented the film, stating that it was "expertly shot" and commenting that the filmmakers "clearly had no shortage of resources". Variety also found the segment of the film which takes place in Argentina (a main focal point) to be of interest.
