= Assineau River 150F =

Coordinates: 55°23′12″N 115°11′16″W

- Indian reserve
- Assineau River Indian Reserve No. 150F
- Location in Alberta
- First Nation: Swan River
- Treaty: 8
- Country: Canada
- Province: Alberta
- Municipal district: Lesser Slave River

Area
  - Total: 71.6 ha (177 acres)
- Time zone: UTC−06:00 (Alberta Time)

Assineau River 150F is an Indian reserve of the Swan River First Nation in Alberta, located within the Municipal District of Lesser Slave River No. 124.
