= Daphne (artist-run centre) =

daphne
- Established: 2020
- Location: Montreal, Quebec, Canada
- Type: Artist-run centre
- Founders: Skawennati, Caroline Monnet, Hannah Claus and Nadia Myre
- Director: Lori Beavis

daphne is an Indigenous artist-run centre in Montreal, Quebec, dedicated to contemporary First Nations, Métis, Inuit, and other Indigenous art.

== History ==
The centre was founded in 2020 by Indigenous artists Nadia Myre, Skawennati, Hannah Claus, and Caroline Monnet. It is named in honour of Odawa-Potawatomi artist Daphne Odjig, and is the first Indigenous artist-run centre in the province of Quebec.

In fall 2020, Anishinaabe curator Lori Beavis was appointed as daphne’s first director. She described its mission as being a gathering place centred on the work of Indigenous artists.

The opening of the physical space was delayed by the COVID-19 pandemic, but the centre launched virtually with artist talks and bead nights before officially opening to the public in May 2021.

== Exhibitions ==
daphne’s inaugural exhibition, Parure (2021), featured the work of Wendat artist Teharihulen Michel Savard. The show included silver and copper jewellery, ceremonial headdresses, and mixed-media portraits combining traditional Wendat forms with contemporary materials such as electronic circuitry. The exhibition paid tribute to 19th-century Wendat artist and chief Teharihulen Zacharie Vincent, situating Savard’s practice in a continuum of Wendat cultural expression.

Subsequent exhibitions have included work by Ilnu artist Sonia Robertson, Kanien’kehá:ka artist Kaia'tanó:ron Dumoulin Bush, and Atikamekw artist Catherine Boivin. In 2024, the centre presented Kū‘ē me ke aloha (Resist with Love), a solo exhibition by Native Hawaiian artist Solomon Robert Nui Enos, marking the first time daphne showcased the work of an artist from outside Canada. The exhibition was curated by Skawennati.
