= Sean Lurie =

American film producer

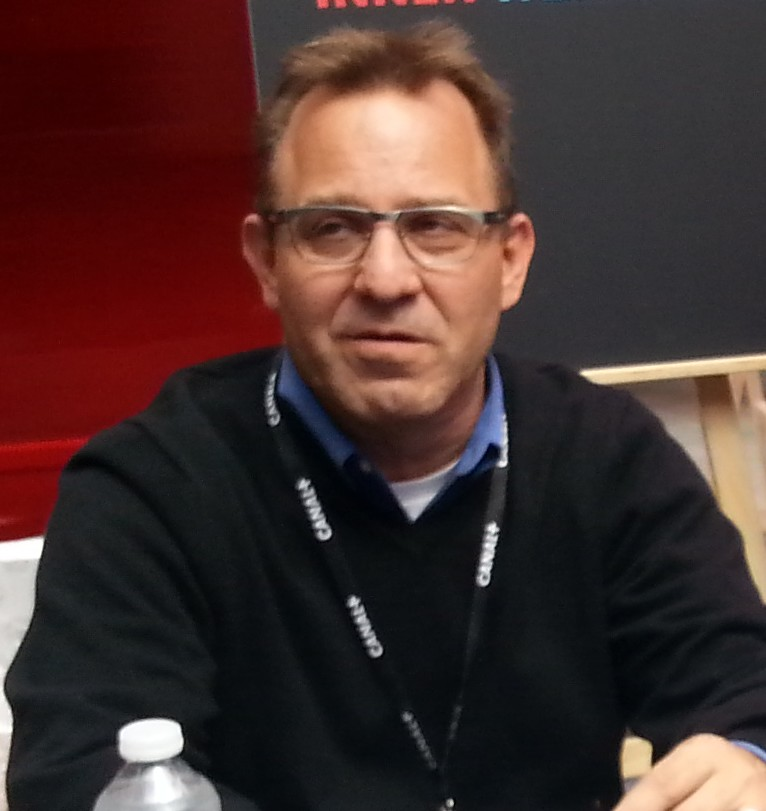
Lurie at the 2016 Annecy International Animated Film Festival

Sean Lurie is an American feature film producer who is credited on multiple animated features. After a career spanning traditional animation management and digital ink and paint, Sean established himself as an animated feature film producer on such titles as The Rugrats Movie, Rugrats in Paris: The Movie, and The Wild Thornberrys Movie. Lurie was hired by DisneyToon Studios (DTS) in 2004 and produced the second CGI feature produced at DTS, entitled Tinker Bell and the Lost Treasure, of which John Lasseter is listed as executive producer.

In June 2010 Lurie was promoted to VP of Production for The Walt Disney Company/Disney Toon Studios and as of January 2014 he is VP of Development for the Walt Disney Animation Studios.

He was nominated for an Oscar in 2016 for Inner Workings.

Lurie is married with two children, and lives in Los Angeles.
