= Gaza Surf Club =

2016 film

- Film poster
- Directed by: Philip Gnadt; Mickey Yamine
- Written by: Philip Gnadt; Mickey Yamine
- Release date: 9 September 2016 (TIFF)
- Running time: 96 minutes
- Country: Germany
- Language: Arabic

Gaza Surf Club is a 2016 German documentary film directed by Philip Gnadt and Mickey Yamine. The film takes a "day in the life" approach and follows the story of a group of Gazans who practice surfing as a source of freedom in the Mediterranean Gaza Strip coast. Also, the journey of the young Ibrahim, one of the surfers who travels to Hawaii looking for opportunities to create a surfing club in the Gaza Strip.

The documentary took 5 years of filming, and it was screened for the first time in the Documentaries section at the 2016 Toronto International Film Festival.

== Synopsis ==
The film documents the story of a group of Palestinians who practice surfing as a recreational activity in their daily lives in the Mediterranean Gaza Strip coast. The film starts by focusing on the narrative of 3 people, which together provide an insight into the culture and reality of surfing in the Gaza Strip. Later on, it follows the journey of Ibrahim, one of those 3 people who travels to Hawaii where a friend of his is waiting and where he hopes to get the inspiration and resources necessary to create a surfing club.

Therefore, the film has two main settings: the Gaza Strip, and Hawaii. During the first part of the documentary, the life of the surfers in Gaza is documented. Once Ibrahim travels to Hawaii, the two scenarios are interspersed.

Due to the small piece of Mediterranean Sea accessible through the sieged Gaza City, surfing is one of the last activities still open to its population. The political turmoil however, challenges their enthusiasm and opportunities for surfing, as there are very limited resources available. The film explains how the surfers try to cope with adversity, and surf as best they can. Sometimes, their surfboards are made of wood, and not the right material. And since they don not have enough of them, they have to take turns to surf the waves.

Large part of the film is a "day in the life" story of the journey of Ibrahim to Hawaii. The directors accompany you from the flight to the arrival and welcome to the United States. There, his friend is waiting for him, who introduces him to the state and its beaches, and who takes him to different surf stores and surf clubs to learn about how the boards are made and to find ways to export them to Gaza. The documentary ends by explaining that Ibrahim did not return from Hawaii to the Gaza Strip.

== Production ==
=== Cast ===
Mohammed Abu Jayab as himself, a 49-year-old fisherman, who struggles to feed his family using the limited fish resources on the sea, and is in charge of instructing surfing to the young population.

Sabah Abu Ghanem as herself, a now 15-year-old girl who is fond of surfing since she was a child. Adolescent girls in Gaza, unlike boys, are not allowed to surf anymore because of the social stigma and cultural norms attached to the female gender. However, Ghanem loves surfing and her father supports her. In several scenes she appears practicing the aquatic activity. In addition, she removes her veil since it does not allow her to surf properly. She says she likes to think it is her choice whether to wear it or not.

Ibrahim N. Arafat as himself, a 23-year-old man with hopes to own and run a surf shop & sport club to encourage the growth of the sport in the Gaza Strip. Arafat tries to obtain a visa which will allow him to travel to Hawaii, where a friend of his, Matthew Olsen, lives. He hopes to learn more about surfing there. His friend is waiting to provide materials for surfing, such as surfing boards and other training resources.

Matthew Olsen as himself

Tom Stone as himself

== Reception ==
After 5 years of filming, the documentary film was first screened at the Toronto International Film Festival in 2016. It had its European premiere on 17 november 2016 at the International Documentary Film Festival Amsterdam and was screened that same year in the Hawaii International Film Festival. In has participated in several more film festivals and documentary competitions.

The journalist Andy Martin, described for The Independent the film as a documentary showing the reality of everyday life in Gaza without using stereotypes. Not just that, he offers a new insight by suggesting that there is a semblance between Palestine and Hawaii, the two scenarios of the film. He explains that Hawaii had been colonized by the United States the same way as Palestine is by Israel.

== Context ==
=== Surfing in the Gaza Strip ===
The Gaza Strip is the Palestinian territory that the documentary is about. The area is situated between the southwest of Israel and the northeast of the Sinai Peninsula (Egypt). It also has a coastline on the Mediterranean Sea. In 2022, the population is estimated at 2.166.269 people, making it the third most populated political entity in the world.

The Gaza Strip, together with the West Bank, are the regions from the former British Mandate for Palestine that form the Palestinian territories. The geographical territory and rule of the area have been a source of conflict and its situation is a result of the non-stopping Israeli-Palestinian conflict.

The territory is under Israeli military occupation since the Six-Day War in 1967, and although in 2005 Israel withdrew settlers from the Gaza Strip, it established a security ring around it. Due to the closing of the borders each time an attack from Gaza is launched on Israel, there is a lack of electricity, drinking water, medication, and goods. Also unemployment, poverty and food insecurity are high. Today, the territory is self-governed but ruled by Hamas, a Palestinian military and nationalist resistance organization.

Access to their waters in the correspondent Mediterranean coast has been progressively denied to the population. Nowadays and since 2012, more than 85% of the maritime areas agreed to in 1995 have been denied to the fishermen.

The ocean, however, is among the last things that people in the Gaza Strip can enjoy, and a public space all the citizens have to share. People surfing in the Gaza Strip find their way to freedom from their political and social situation in the aquatic activity. In this way, surfing is part of their daily lives and their culture. Surfing takes a very important role for the Palestinian population in the Gaza Strip, has been transmitted generationally, and has an important meaning for their homeland.

The political conflict and turmoil, the scarce supplies, and the loss of rights over their lands make it difficult for Gazans to surf. Previous to the Gaza Surf Club, since 2005, the Surfing 4 Peace cooperation has been trying to donate surfboards. It took a lot of effort and difficulty to donate, as the security ring and checkpoints were not allowing them to cross. In 2010 Surfing 4 Peace donated 30 surfboards to the local surfers in Gaza.

Apart from being the name of the 2016 documentary film, Gaza Surf Club is as well an actual sports club founded in 2008 in Gaza by the Explore Corps, a United States based non-for-profit organization. It is responsible for educational programs and community empowerment for the surfers in the Gaza Strip.

== See also ==
- God Went Surfing with the Devil, a related documentary film.
