= Kabloonak =

- Directed by: Claude Massot
- Written by: Claude Massot; Sebastian Regnier
- Produced by: Georges Benayoun; Pierre Gendron
- Starring: Charles Dance; Adamie Inukpuk; Bernard Bloch; Natar Ungalaaq
- Cinematography: François Protat; Jacques Loiseleux
- Edited by: Joelle Hache; Claire Pinheiro
- Music by: Sebastian Regnier
- Release date: August 25, 1994 (MWFF)
- Running time: 103 minutes
- Country: Canada
- Language: English

Kabloonak (Inuktitut for 'White Person') is a Canadian drama film, directed by Claude Massot and released in 1994.

== Plot ==
The film is about the making of Nanook of the North, a 1922 film about an Inuk called Nanook and his family in the Canadian Arctic.

== Cast ==
The film's cast includes Charles Dance as producer and director Robert J. Flaherty, Adamie Inukpuk as Nanook, Bernard Bloch as Thierry Malet, and Natar Ungalaaq as Mukpullu.

== Production and release ==
The film was shot in Siberia and the Northwest Territories.

It premiered at the Montreal World Film Festival in August 1994, and was released theatrically on September 16, 1994 in Canada.

== Awards ==
François Protat received a Genie Award nomination for Best Cinematography at the 15th Genie Awards in 1994 for his work on the film.

Charles Dance won the award for "Best Actor" at the Paris Film Festival 1994 for this film, and Claude Massot was awarded a "Special Jury Prize". At the Montréal World Film Festival 1994, Jacques Loiseleux won for "Best Artistic Contribution", and François Protat for "Photography". At the Gijón International Film Festival 1994, Claude Massot won three awards, for "Best Director", the "Grand Prix Asturias" (for "Best Feature"), and a "Special Prize of the Young Jury".
