= Roberta (2014 film) =

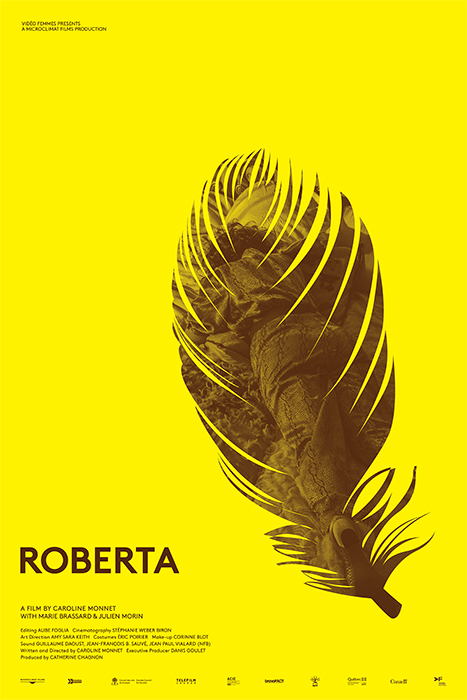
- Poster of the movie
- Directed by: Caroline Monnet
- Written by: Caroline Monnet
- Produced by: Catherine Chagnon
- Starring: Marie Brassard; Julien Morin
- Cinematography: Stéphanie Anne Weber Biron
- Edited by: Aube Foglia
- Production company: Microclimat Films
- Release date: October 12, 2014 (imagineNATIVE)
- Running time: 21 minutes
- Country: Canada
- Language: French

Roberta is a Canadian short drama film, directed by Caroline Monnet and released in 2014. The film stars Marie Brassard as Roberta, a housewife and mother who turns to drugs and alcohol to deal with the stultifying conformity of her suburban life.

The film premiered in 2014 at the imagineNATIVE Film + Media Arts Festival.

The film received a Canadian Screen Award nomination for Best Live Action Short Drama at the 4th Canadian Screen Awards.

== Cast ==
- Marie Brassard as Roberta
- Julien Morin
