= Fluffy (2016 film) =

- Serbian: Flafi
- Directed by: Lee Filipovski
- Written by: Lee Filipovski
- Produced by: Lee Filipovski; Aleksandra Lazarovski; Senka Nikolic; Igor Vranjkovic
- Starring: Tamara Krcunovic; Srdjan Miletic; Helena Jakovljevic; Slaven Došlo
- Cinematography: Aleksandar Karaulic
- Edited by: Davor Bosankic
- Production company: Cineplanet
- Release date: September 12, 2016 (TIFF)
- Running time: 24 minutes
- Country: Canada
- Language: Serbian

Fluffy (Serbian: Flafi) is a Canadian short drama film, directed by Lee Filipovski and released in 2016. The film centres on a family in Serbia who are preparing to move to Canada, but find their plans complicated when 10-year-old daughter Ljubica unexpectedly wins a giant teddy bear, leaving the family to debate how to either get the bear to Canada with them or break Ljubica's heart by leaving it behind. The film's cast includes Tamara Krcunovic, Srdjan Miletic, Helena Jakovljevic and Slaven Došlo.

The film premiered at the 2016 Toronto International Film Festival. It was subsequently named to the festival's year-end Canada's Top Ten list of the year's best short films.

The film won the Canadian Screen Award for Best Live Action Short Film at the 6th Canadian Screen Awards.
