= América Latina Olé =

2016 concert tour by the Rolling Stones

- Continental tour by The Rolling Stones
- Promotional poster for the tour
- Location: North America; South America
- Start date: 3 February 2016
- End date: 25 March 2016
- No. of shows: 14
- Attendance: 1.229 million
- Box office: $83,894,323

The Rolling Stones concert chronology
- Zip Code (2015); América Latina Olé (2016); No Filter Tour (2017–2021)

América Latina Olé was a concert tour by The Rolling Stones, which began on 3 February 2016 in Santiago and made stops in La Plata, Montevideo, Rio de Janeiro, São Paulo, Porto Alegre, Lima, Bogotá, Mexico City and ended in Havana with a free show on 25 March 2016. The tour was chronicled on two video releases: The Rolling Stones: Havana Moon, which documented the final show, and Olé Olé Olé!: A Trip Across Latin America, a documentary following the band across the continent.

== History ==
On 17 September 2015, the Spanish newspaper El Mundo revealed that the Rolling Stones were (at the time) in final negotiations to perform for the very first time in Cuba, at the end of March 2016 (on 20 or 21 March). The location would be Havana and the venue the Estadio Latinoamericano (Latin American Stadium), a facility with a capacity for 55,000 people. Keith Richards confirmed the negotiations with the Cubans, adding that Cuba had taken it seriously, following the opening of embassies in the United States and the Pope's (then) upcoming visit to Havana. It was also reported that the Stones' bassist Darryl Jones had influenced the decision to play in Cuba.

On 5 November 2015, the América Latina Olé tour was officially announced, marking the first time the Rolling Stones would tour in Latin America since their A Bigger Bang Tour in 2006. The tour would include their second ever show in Chile after their visit during the Voodoo Lounge Tour in February 1995, and their first show in São Paulo since the Bridges to Babylon Tour in April 1998. The Stones were also due to play their first ever shows in Uruguay, Peru, Colombia and Cuba.

Later in November 2015, another show was rumoured to occur also on 20 or 21 March 2016 at the Estadio Olimpico Felix Sanchez in Santo Domingo, Dominican Republic but this show was never confirmed. On 1 March 2016, The Stones confirmed their first ever show in Cuba due to occur on 25 March 2016, to be a free concert, their first ever in the Caribbean and the first open air concert in the country by a British rock band. The band played at, but not inside, the Coliseo de la Ciudad Deportiva de La Habana. Dubbed the "Concert for Amity," it broke the previous record of the Italian singer Zucchero Fornaciari who performed to a crowd of nearly 70,000 goers in 2012. The concert was recorded and later released as an album and concert film.

== Set list ==
The following set list was obtained from the concert held on 3 February 2016 at the Estadio Nacional in Santiago, Chile. It does not represent all concerts for the duration of the tour.

1. "Start Me Up"
2. "It's Only Rock 'n Roll (But I Like It)"
3. "Let's Spend the Night Together"
4. "Tumbling Dice"
5. "Out of Control"
6. "She's a Rainbow"
7. "Wild Horses"
8. "Paint It Black"
9. "Honky Tonk Women"
10. "You Got the Silver"
11. "Happy"
12. "Midnight Rambler"
13. "Miss You"
14. "Gimme Shelter"
15. "Jumpin' Jack Flash"
16. "Sympathy for the Devil"
17. "Brown Sugar"

Encore

18. "You Can't Always Get What You Want"
19. "(I Can't Get No) Satisfaction"

== Tour dates ==
List of 2016 concerts
Date (2016)	City	Country	Venue	Opening act(s)	Attendance	Revenue
3 February	Santiago	Chile	Estadio Nacional	Los Tres	62,412 / 62,412	$6,160,725
7 February	La Plata (Note: Billed as Buenos Aires in promotional material.)	Argentina	Estadio Ciudad de La Plata	Ciro y los Persas; La Beriso	155,184 / 155,184	$17,637,161
10 February	La Plata	Argentina	Estadio Ciudad de La Plata	Ciro y los Persas; La Beriso	155,184 / 155,184	$17,637,161
13 February	La Plata	Argentina	Estadio Ciudad de La Plata	Ciro y los Persas; La Beriso	155,184 / 155,184	$17,637,161
16 February	Montevideo	Uruguay	Estadio Centenario	Boomerang	61,445 / 61,445	$7,596,103
20 February	Rio de Janeiro	Brazil	Estádio do Maracanã	Ultraje a Rigor; Dr Pheabes	60,051 / 60,051	$5,588,851
24 February	São Paulo	Brazil	Estádio do Morumbi	Titãs	135,656 / 135,656	$12,255,726
27 February	São Paulo	Brazil	Estádio do Morumbi	Titãs	135,656 / 135,656	$12,255,726
2 March	Porto Alegre	Brazil	Estádio Beira-Rio	Cachorro Grande; Dr Pheabes	49,073 / 49,073	$6,441,579
6 March	Lima	Peru	Estadio Monumental	Frágil & Andrés Dulude	47,119 / 47,119	$8,095,011
10 March	Bogotá	Colombia	Estadio El Campín	Diamante Eléctrico	40,785 / 40,785	$6,905,869
14 March	Mexico City	Mexico	Foro Sol	Little Jesus	117,567 / 117,567	$13,213,298
17 March	Mexico City	Mexico	Foro Sol	Little Jesus	117,567 / 117,567	$13,213,298
25 March	Havana	Cuba	Ciudad Deportiva de La Habana	—	500,000	Free
Total					1,229,292 / 1,229,292 (100%)	$90.9 million

== Personnel ==
=== The Rolling Stones ===
- Mick Jagger – lead vocals, guitars, harmonica, percussion
- Keith Richards – rhythm guitars, backing vocals
- Charlie Watts – drums
- Ronnie Wood – lead guitars

=== Additional musicians ===
- Sasha Allen – backing vocals, duet with Jagger on "Gimme Shelter"
- Matt Clifford – introduction voice, keyboards, percussion, French horn
- Karl Denson – saxophone
- Bernard Fowler – backing vocals, percussion
- Darryl Jones – bass guitar
- Chuck Leavell – keyboards, backing vocals
- Tim Ries – saxophone, keyboards

== See also ==
- The Rolling Stones concerts
