= King of the Dancehall (film) =

2016 film

- Directed by: Nick Cannon
- Written by: Nick Cannon
- Produced by: Nick Cannon; Melissa D. Llewellyn; Roger Ubina; Busta Rhymes
- Starring: Nick Cannon
- Release date: September 11, 2016 (TIFF)
- Running time: 100 minutes
- Country: United States
- Languages: English; Jamaican Patois

King of the Dancehall is a 2016 American drama film directed by Nick Cannon. It was screened in the Special Presentations section at the 2016 Toronto International Film Festival. Rather than receiving a traditional theater or DVD release, Cannon decided to partner with and exclusively release it on YouTube Red on Russell Simmons' All Def Digital channel beginning in August 2017.

== Cast ==
- Nick Cannon as Tarzan Brixton
- Kimberly Patterson as Maya Fenster
- Whoopi Goldberg as Loretta Brixton
- Busta Rhymes as Allestar "All Star Toasta"
- Kreesha Turner as Kaydeen
- Collie Buddz as Donovan "Dada" Davidson
