= Isabella (2020 film) =

Isabella is a 2020 Argentine movie by Matías Piñeiro. It stars María Villar and Agustina Muñoz.
