= Jeffrey (2016 film) =

2016 film

- Directed by: Yanillys Perez
- Written by: Yanillys Perez
- Release date: 10 September 2016 (TIFF)
- Running time: 78 minutes
- Country: Dominican Republic
- Language: Spanish

Jeffrey is a 2016 Dominican Republic documentary film about a young man's struggle to become a professional reggaeton singer, directed by Yanillys Perez. It was screened in the Discovery section at the 2016 Toronto International Film Festival.
