= Blessed Benefit =

2016 film

- Directed by: Mahmoud al Massad
- Written by: Mahmoud Al Massad
- Produced by: Mahmoud Al Massad; Dima Hamdallah; Thanassis Karathanos; Julius Ponten
- Starring: Mahmoud al Massad
- Cinematography: Giorgos Mihelis
- Edited by: Mahmoud Al Massad; Simon El Habre; Petar Markovic; Wouter Van Luijn
- Music by: Andre Matthias
- Release date: 9 September 2016 (TIFF)
- Running time: 83 minutes
- Countries: Jordan; Germany; Netherlands
- Language: Arabic

Blessed Benefit is a 2016 internationally co-produced drama film directed by Mahmoud al Massad. It was selected to be screened in the Discovery section at the 2016 Toronto International Film Festival.

== Cast ==
- Mahmoud al Massad as Ibrahim
- Odai Hijazi as Ahmad's Cousin
- Ahmad Thaher as Ahmad
