= Blindness (2016 film) =

2016 film

- Film poster
- Directed by: Ryszard Bugajski
- Written by: Ryszard Bugajski
- Starring: Maria Mamona
- Cinematography: Arkadiusz Tomiak
- Release dates: 9 September 2016 (TIFF); 21 October 2016 (Poland)
- Running time: 110 minutes
- Country: Poland
- Language: Polish

Blindness (Polish: Zaćma) is a 2016 Polish drama film directed by Ryszard Bugajski. It was screened in the Contemporary World Cinema section at the 2016 Toronto International Film Festival.

== Cast ==
- Maria Mamona as Julia Brystygier
- Malgorzata Zajaczkowska as Sister Benedicta
- Janusz Gajos as Father Cieciorka
- Marek Kalita as The Primate, Cardinal Wyszynski
- Bartosz Porczyk as Prisoner
- Kazimierz Kaczor as Mourner
- Slawomir Orzechowski as Caretaker
- Marcin Tronski as Bartender

== Plot ==
The action of the film takes place in the second half of the 1950s in Warsaw and the Institute for the Blind in Laski. Julia Brystiger is no longer an officer of the security apparatus of the People's Republic of Poland, she works as an editor in a publishing house and is now investigated by the Security Services herself. Looking for spiritual advice, she tries to meet with Primate Stefan Wyszyński. Before she confronts the Primate of the Millennium, Julia will have to convince a nun who is experiencing a crisis of faith and a priest who was blinded by the security service during the interrogation.
