= Joyce Smyth =

English solicitor and music manager (born 1957)

- Born: 1957 (age 68–69)
- Education: Clare College, Cambridge
- Occupations: Solicitor; music manager
- Years active: 1980s–present
- Known for: Manager of The Rolling Stones
- Website: glastry.com

Joyce Smyth (born 1957) is an English solicitor. She has been the manager of the British rock band The Rolling Stones since 2010.

== Biogrpahy ==
Smyth was raised in Portsmouth, and attended grammar school and college in Fareham. While working on her A-levels, she played guitar and sang folk music at local restaurants and pubs. She then read law at Clare College, Cambridge, where she was a member of the folk music club and helped to organise the Cambridge Folk Festival. After graduating university, Smyth moved to London to work for the law firm Theodore Goddard in its private client practice. In the 1980s, she was assigned Prince Rupert Loewenstein, the then-business manager for The Rolling Stones, as a client; Loewenstein eventually became her mentor in the music business.

Smyth became partner at Theodore Goddard and, in 1990, she was appointed the head of its private client practice. Throughout the 1990s, the firm began to shift its focus toward corporate work, such as mergers and acquisitions. In 1997, Smyth—who felt that the private client practice was being treated as a "second-class division"—left the firm at the urging of Loewenstein. She started a new firm, Smyth Barkham, with her partner Caroline Barkham and the other private client attorneys at Theodore Goddard. They took their clients—including the Stones—with them.

In 2010, Smyth took over as the Stones' manager when Loewenstein retired. As manager, she promoted the band's 50th anniversary in 2012. She was an executive producer of the band's 2012 documentary Crossfire Hurricane and she organised the band's 2016 concert in Havana.

Smyth has co-managed Celine Dion through her music management firm Glastry since 2023. She also represented Cheryl in her divorce with Ashley Cole, Phil Collins, and Mick Jagger in the annulment of his marriage with Jerry Hall.

Smyth is married to the lawyer Michael Smyth, whom she met at Cambridge.
