= God Went Surfing with the Devil =

- Directed by: Alexander Klein
- Produced by: Alexander Klein; Edward Chase Masterson; Jonathan Schwartz; Nikki Scoggins
- Starring: Matthew Olsen, Arthur Rashkovan, Gil Keren
- Cinematography: Edward Chase Masterson
- Edited by: David Croom, Geoffrey Lafayette, Edward Chase Masterson
- Music by: Mark Noseworthy
- Production company: Cinema Libre
- Release date: February 8, 2010 (Santa Barbara)
- Running time: 124 minutes
- Country: United States
- Language: English

God Went Surfing with the Devil is a 2010 surfing documentary directed by Alexander Klein that follows the story of a group of activists who are trying to get a shipment of 23 surfboards into the Gaza Strip. The group is met with several problems, including the border of Gaza being sealed by Israel. The DVD was released in the US on May 24, 2011 and shortly thereafter was distributed on Netflix.

== See also ==
- Gaza Surf Club, a related documentary film
