= Swan River 150E =

Cree First Nation reserve in Alberta, Canada

Coordinates: 55°21′54″N 115°30′22″W

Location of Swan River 150E Alberta

Swan River 150E is a Cree First Nation reserve in Kinuso, Alberta, Canada. It is located 241 kilometres (150 mi) northwest of Edmonton. It is at an elevation of 581 metres (1,906 ft).
