= Lee Filipovski =

Serbian-Canadian film director and screenwriter

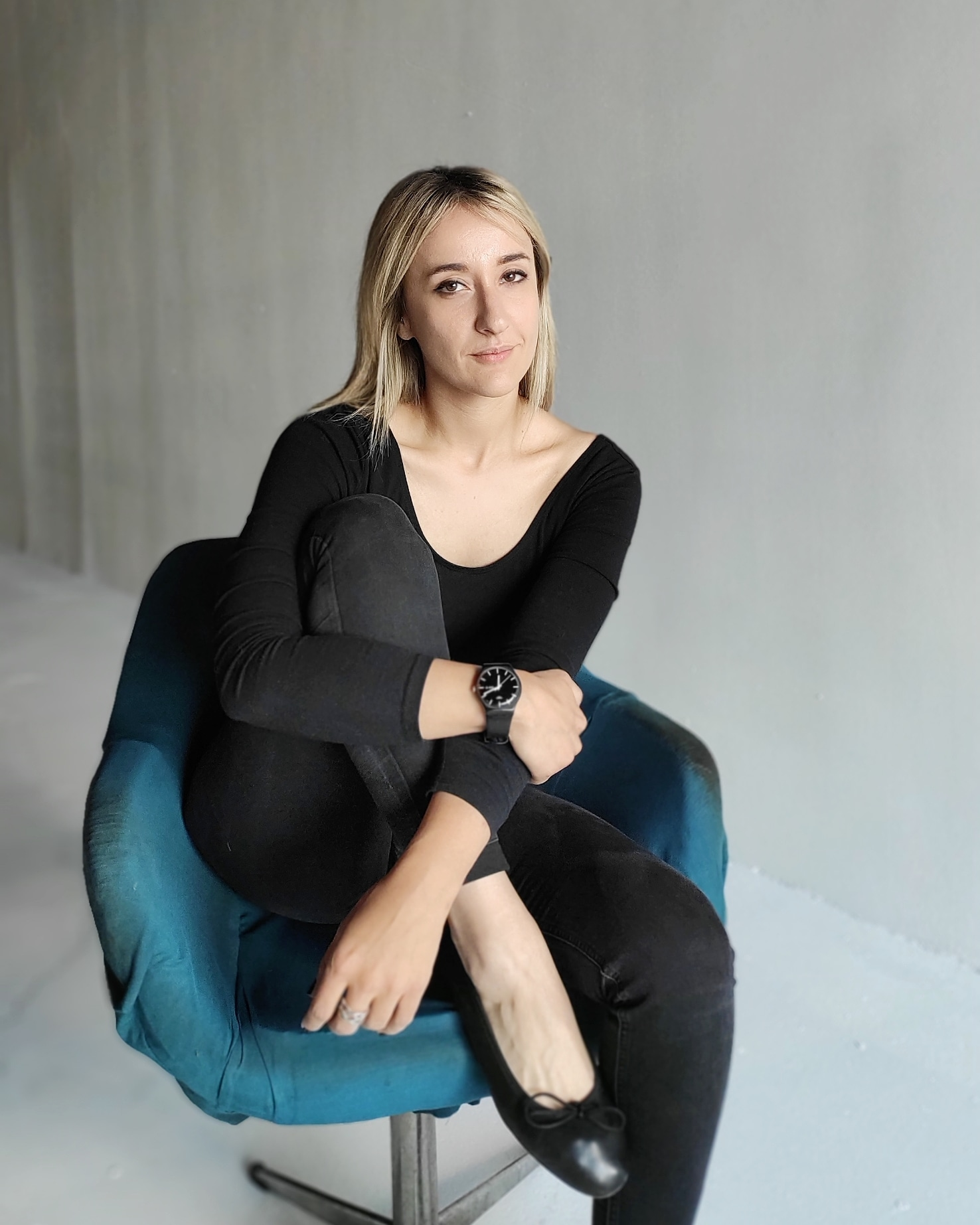
Lee Filipovski

Lee Filipovski is a Serbian-Canadian film director and screenwriter. Filipovski is most noted for her 2016 short film Fluffy (Flafi), which won the Canadian Screen Award for Best Live Action Short Film at the 6th Canadian Screen Awards. and the Hollywood Foreign Press Association Award for Best Short Film in 2017.

Her next short film, Zero (Nula), premiered at the 2021 Toronto International Film Festival.

Her feature directorial debut, The Myth of a Real Man, was shot in Serbia in 2025 for a planned theatrical release in 2026.
