= Leo Matsuda =

Japanese-Brazilian animator

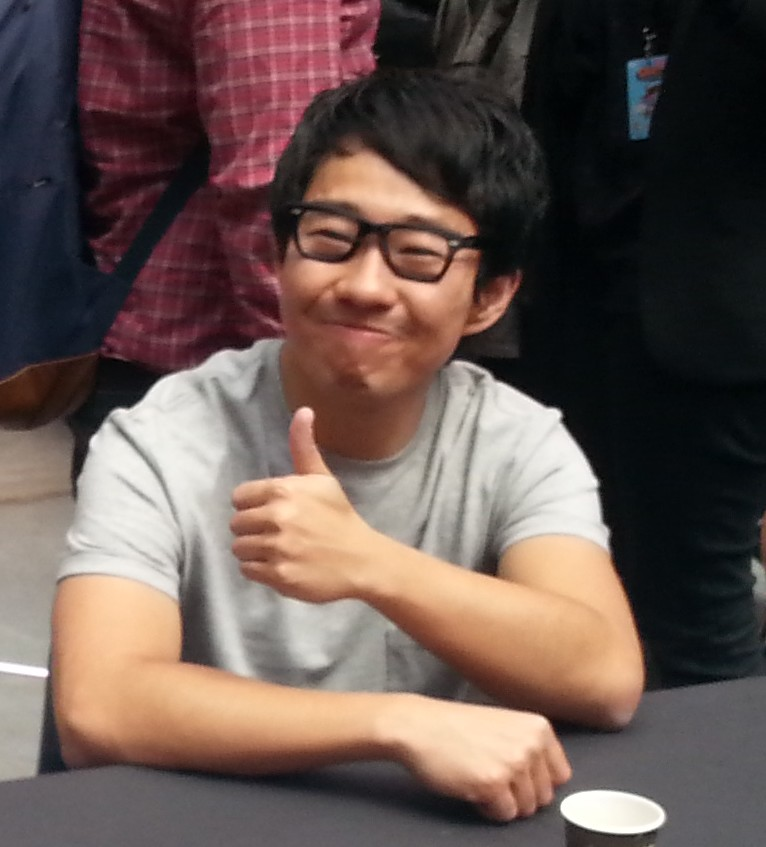
Matsuda at the 2016 Annecy International Animation Film Festival

Leo Matsuda is a Japanese-Brazilian art director, animator, and screenwriter.

With Inner Workings (2016), an animated short that played before Moana, Matsuda became the first Brazilian to direct a short or film for Disney.

== Biography ==
Matsuda was born in São Paulo. He worked in advertising at first in Brazil. He later moved to Venice Beach in the greater Los Angeles region, where he lived starting from around 2008. He studied animation at CalArts. He admires the work of famous animators Ward Kimball and Chuck Jones, as well as the comedy of Monty Python, and the filmmakers Jacques Tati and Wes Anderson. While he did some initial work at 20th Century Fox and Pixar, he eventually worked for Disney, including Wreck-It Ralph (2012). Matsuda's animation work for Wreck-it Ralph received a nomination for an Annie Award for storyboarding in an animated feature. He won an internal competition at Disney for who would get to direct the short film that would appear before Moana. The result was the short Inner Workings (2016), which he directed and wrote the script for. This made him the first Brazilian to direct a film for Disney.

In 2018, Matsuda and DreamWorks Animation arranged a deal for Matsuda to produce two films for them, one called Sputnik and the other Yokai Samba. As of June 2024, the rights to Yokai Samba, a work involving both Japanese and Brazilian folklore, had been transferred to Paramount Animation and Nickelodeon Movies. Mitch Watson and Stacey Lubliner are said to be involved with the project as well. Matsuda was also working on a film produced by New Line Cinema based on Sanrio's Hello Kitty franchise, before he was replaced as director by David Derrick Jr. and John Aoshima.

== Filmography ==
- The Simpsons Movie (2007), animator
- PreKissToric Times (2008), director
- Rio (2011), junior story artist
- Wreck-It Ralph (2012), animator
- Big Hero 6 (2014), animator
- Zootopia (2016), animator
- Inner Workings (2016), director, screenwriter
- Yokai Samba (TBA), director, screenwriter
