= Inner Workings =

- Film poster
- Directed by: Leo Matsuda
- Written by: Leo Matsuda
- Produced by: Sean Lurie
- Starring: Raymond S. Persi
- Cinematography: Jean-Christophe Poulain
- Edited by: Shannon Stein
- Music by: Ludwig Göransson
- Production company: Walt Disney Animation Studios
- Distributed by: Walt Disney Studios; Motion Pictures (Note: Distributed by Walt Disney Studios Motion Pictures through the Walt Disney Pictures banner.)
- Release dates: June 17, 2016 (Annecy Animation Film Festival); November 23, 2016 (with Moana)
- Running time: 6 minutes
- Country: United States
- Language: English

Inner Workings is an animated comedy short film produced by Walt Disney Animation Studios. It is written and directed by Leo Matsuda and produced by Sean Lurie. It premiered in theaters on November 23, 2016 along with Walt Disney Pictures' Moana.

== Plot ==
The short follows the inner workings of Paul, a man living in California during the 1980s. (Note: Possibly July 18th 1985 based on background details in the short film (e.g.: Paul's watch)) Paul's Brain, Heart, Lungs, Stomach, Bladder and Kidneys all awaken on a typical day for work. Heart expresses desires to try a large breakfast special at the urging of Stomach, play around on the beach, and try out a new pair of sunglasses at a stand that is run by an attractive sunglasses vendor named Kate. However, Brain simply wants Paul to get to work on time at Boring, Boring & Glum and avoid possible hazards that Brain thinks will kill Paul along the way. Fed up with Heart's constant sidetracked nature, Brain takes away Heart's control so that Paul can get to work on time. He and dozens of other employees sit at desks and enter data into their computers, moving simultaneously. Brain takes notice of the dreary routine of Paul's life and comes to realize that this cycle will eventually lead to his death as a miserable old man.

During lunch, Brain gives control of Paul back to Heart, who sends him off to partake of the activities that Brain had passed up on the way to the office. Paul returns to work afterward, happy and content, and begins to dance to a lively beat whose energy quickly spreads to his coworkers and even to his elderly bosses. During the credits, Paul starts performing other fun activities with his bosses and coworkers, marries the sunglasses vendor, and has children with her.

== Cast ==
- Tucker Gilmore
- Raymond S. Persi

== Production ==
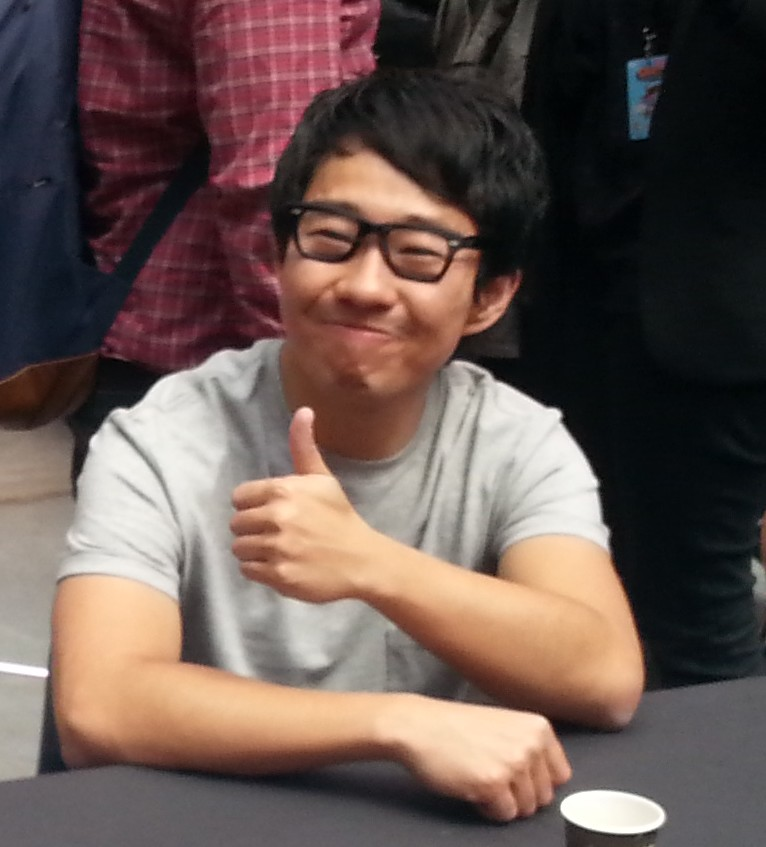
Director Leo Matsuda at the 2016 Annecy International Animation Film Festival

In April 2016, it was announced that Walt Disney Animation Studios had developed another short film, titled Inner Workings, about the internal struggle between a man's pragmatic, logical side and his free-spirited, adventurous half. Leo Matsuda, a story artist on Big Hero 6 and Wreck-It Ralph, directed the film, which Sean Lurie produced. According to Matsuda, the film was loosely based on biological transparent overlays he read from Encyclopædia Britannica as a child.

The short combines hand-drawn and CG animation, using Walt Disney Animation Studios' 2D interpolation software Meander, which was employed before in their Oscar-winning shorts Paperman and Feast.

=== Music ===
The short's music was composed by Ludwig Göransson. The Miami Sound Machine-esque theme song "California Loco", featuring Este Haim, was released on Amazon.com on December 16, 2016.

== Release ==
Inner Workings was released on November 23, 2016, along with Walt Disney Pictures' Moana and also included in The Animation Showcase 2016.

== See also ==
- Inside Out (2015)
- Reason and Emotion (1943)
- Osmosis Jones (2001)
- Cranium Command (theme park attraction)
- Cranium (board game)
