= Hermia & Helena =

Hermia & Helena is a 2017 film by Argentine director Matías Piñeiro. It follows the fictional story of two young women based on William Shakespeare's A Midsummer Night’s Dream characters Hermia and Helena.
