= Tshiuetin =

- Directed by: Caroline Monnet
- Written by: Daniel Watchorn
- Produced by: Eric Cinq-Mars
- Cinematography: Eric Cinq-Mars
- Distributed by: Canadian Broadcasting Corporation
- Release date: 2016
- Running time: 11 minutes
- Country: Canada
- Language: French

Tshiuetin (Innu for North Wind) is a 2016 Canadian short documentary film directed by Caroline Monnet.

== Subject ==
The short concerns Tshiuetin Rail Transportation, which has a line running from Labrador to Schefferville, Quebec that came under the control of a First Nations group in December 2005, an unprecedented situation in the history of Canada. Aboriginal groups have been proud of owning the line, with the documentary attempting to convey why the line is significant.

== Release and reception ==
The film was featured in the 2016 Toronto International Film Festival. It was nominated in the 5th Canadian Screen Awards in the short documentary category, with Monnet being among numerous Aboriginal artists nominated.
