= Matías Piñeiro =

Matías Piñeiro is an Argentine filmmaker. He is best known for his movie adaptations of Shakespearean characters, which he calls Shakespeareads. Piñeiro has directed Hermia & Helena, Isabella, The Princess of France and Viola.
