= The Rolling Stones: Havana Moon =

2016 film

Havana Moon
- Official cover
- Directed by: Paul Dugdale
- Produced by: Simon Fisher
- Cinematography: Brett Turnbull
- Edited by: Simon Bryant; Tom Watson
- Music by: The Rolling Stones
- Production company: JA Digital
- Distributed by: Eagle Rock Entertainment
- Release date: 23 September 2016
- Running time: 116 minutes
- Country: United States
- Language: English

Havana Moon is a concert film by the Rolling Stones, directed by Paul Dugdale. Havana Moon was filmed on 25 March 2016 in Havana, Cuba. The film records a free outdoor concert by the band at the Ciudad Deportiva de la Habana sports complex, which was attended by an estimated 500,000 concert-goers. The concert marked the first time a rock band had performed in Cuba to such a large crowd, breaking the previous record of the Italian singer Zucchero Fornaciari, who performed to a crowd of nearly 70,000 goers in 2012. After a one night premiere on 23 September, the film was released in multiple formats on 11 November 2016.

When the news that sitting United States president, Barack Obama was to visit Cuba—the first time a sitting president had visited the island nation in 88 years—the concert was rescheduled from 20 March to 25 March. The performance and film received critical acclaim, and was immediately noted as an important moment in Cuban music history.

== Production ==
=== Development ===
The concert was suggested by lawyer Gregory Elias to Rolling Stones manager Joyce Smyth during a phone call on 13 November 2015. Elias suggested that the Stones play a free concert in Cuba, which he would cover the costs of – to which Smyth responded "Well, that's certainly a unique proposal". The concert was bankrolled by Elias' charitable organization, Fundashon Bon Intenshon. There was some speculation that the move on Elias' part was politically motivated, to which he responded in a statement that he only wanted to do something good for the Cuban people and did not have any business relations in the country.

The concert was planned for several months prior to its public announcement while the band was on their 2016 tour of South America, titled América Latina Olé Tour 2016. The bands' manager, Joyce Smyth, and Concerts West worked extensively with the Cuban government in order for the show to be approved, due to the Cuban government still having control over what its citizens listen to. The embargo on Cuba proved to be a technical challenge for the band and stage crews since they had to ship all of their equipment from Belgium and could not rely on local infrastructure to assist to the degree that they are used to in more developed areas.

=== Delays ===
The concert took place five days after President Barack Obama visited Cuba, marking the first time a sitting United States president had visited the island nation since the 30th President of the United States, Calvin Coolidge, visited the nation 88 years earlier, in 1928. After it was announced that President Obama would arrive on 20 March 2016, the decision was made to reschedule the concert to 25 March, due to security concerns. Shortly before the rescheduled concert date, Pope Francis attempted to delay it, asking that the band play on a later date as the concert was scheduled for 25 March, which was Good Friday, a major and solemn Christian holiday. The Vatican also suggested that the band delay the start of their concert until midnight to avoid the holy day. However, the Stones opted to play the concert at the originally scheduled date and time.

=== Events ===
Prior to the show, the band were guests of honour at the British embassy in Cuba, which held a meet and greet on 24 March 2016 for approximately 200 people, many being Cuban musicians. The Rolling Stones also started a "musician-to-musician" charity initiative in which musical instruments were donated by major instrument suppliers to Cuban musicians of all genres.

=== Release ===
Havana Moon had a limited one night premiere in over one thousand theatres internationally 23 September 2016. The film made its United States television premiere on the premium cable television service Starz 22 January 2017, but could be downloaded on the Starz app 15 January 2017. The sound track of the film was released on the iTunes Store and the music streaming service Spotify 11 November 2016. The film was released on DVD, Blu-ray, DVD+2CD, DVD+3LP, Digital Video, and Digital Audio.

== Reception ==
The concert itself was attended by a crowd estimated to have consisted of over 500,000 concert-goers and marked the first time a foreign rock band had performed an open-air concert in Cuba to a crowd of that size, breaking the previous record of the Italian singer Zucchero Fornaciari who performed to a crowd of nearly 70,000 goers in 2012.

The film received critical acclaim from multiple publications, including The New York Times, The Guardian, Rolling Stone, and The Daily Telegraph. The New York Times stated that "The Rolling Stones gave a stunning performance". The Guardian remarked that the show was "spectacular and historic". Rolling Stone magazine praised the concert, stating that it was "no ordinary concert" and had a significant impact for music in Cuba.

This was no ordinary concert. People hugged and shared looks of disbelief. Coming at the end of a run of shows in South America and Mexico, last night might have marked at least a temporary pause for the legendary group, but it had all the markings of a new chapter for music in Cuba.

— Richard L. Dewey, Rolling Stone, 26 March 2016

We have performed in many special places during our long career but this show in Havana is going to be a landmark event for us, and, we hope, for all our friends in Cuba too.

— The Rolling Stones official statement, 1 March 2016

== Set list ==
All tracks are written by Jagger/Richards.

Havana Moon album track listing
No.	Title	Length
1.	"Jumpin' Jack Flash"	4:46
2.	"It's Only Rock 'n Roll (But I Like It)"	4:35
3.	"Tumbling Dice"	5:03
4.	"Out of Control"	7:13
5.	"All Down the Line"	5:22
6.	"Angie"	3:29
7.	"Paint It Black"	5:32
8.	"Honky Tonk Women"	4:57
9.	"You Got the Silver"	3:29
10.	"Before They Make Me Run"	4:02
11.	"Midnight Rambler"	15:29
12.	"Miss You"	8:20
13.	"Gimme Shelter"	8:04
14.	"Start Me Up"	4:21
15.	"Sympathy for the Devil"	7:55
16.	"Brown Sugar"	7:13
17.	"You Can't Always Get What You Want"	8:57
18.	"(I Can't Get No) Satisfaction"	10:28
Total length:		119:22

The song "Pass the Wine (Sophia Loren)", a leftover from the Exile on Main St. 1972 sessions, is played over the film's end credits.
