= Bernard Bloch (actor) =

French actor and theatre director

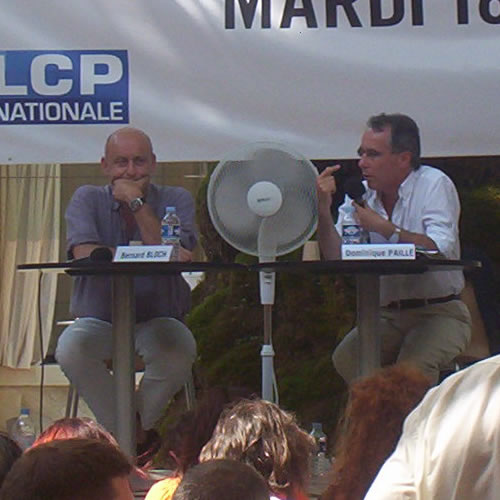
- Bernard Bloch (left) in 2006
- Born: 11 December 1949 (age 76); Mulhouse, Haut-Rhin, France
- Occupations: Actor, theatre director
- Years active: 1972–present

Bernard Bloch (born 11 December 1949) is a French actor and theatre director.

== Filmography ==
- 1972: Albert Einstein (TV): Un membre de l'académie d'Olympia
- 1974: The Story of Paul: L'harmonica
- 1980: Fernand: Fernand
- 1980: Le Cheval dans le béton (TV): Maury
- 1981: Allons z'enfants: Adjudant Viellard
- 1982: Les Prédateurs (TV): Anatole
- 1982: Enigma
- 1984: La Digue (TV): Le technicien
- 1985: Châteauvallon (série TV)
- 1986: Bleu comme l'enfer: Kovacs
- 1986: Fatherland: Journalist
- 1987: La fée carabine (TV): Cercaire
- 1989: Radio Corbeau: Louis Gerfaut
- 1989: Un français libre (The Free Frenchman): Col. Vivet
- 1989: L'Orchestre rouge: Jung
- 1990: Secret défense (Hidden Agenda): Henri
- 1991: Les Carnassiers (TV): Commissaire Lagorce
- 1991: Arthur Rimbaud - Une biographie: Ernest Delahaye
- 1991: Salut les coquins (TV): Lormont
- 1993: Paranoïa
- 1993: L'Affaire Seznec (TV): Le Her
- 1993: La Naissance de l'amour: Le douanier
- 1995: Kabloonak: Thierry Malet
- 1996: Morlock: Le tunnel (TV): Colbert
- 1996: Un monde meilleur (TV): Steven
- 1996: Le Coeur fantôme: Guard
- 1996: Un héros très discret: Ernst
- 1996: Des nouvelles du bon Dieu
- 1997: Alors voilà: Marcel
- 1998: Ronin: Sergei
- 1999: À mort la mort: Bernard
- 1999: Une pour toutes: Le chef de service
- 2000: La Vache et le président: Bichon
- 2002: Novo: Docteur Sagem
- 2003: Monsieur N.: Von Holgendorp
- 2003: Le Coût de la vie: Richet, l'huissier
- 2003: Inquiétudes: Le père de Bruno
- 2004: À l'arraché: L'homme "qui a tout vu"
- 2004: Je suis un assassin: Le portier
- 2004: Double zéro: Col. Fosse
- 2005: Entre ses mains: Le directeur de la compagnie d'assurances
- 2005: S.A.C.: Des hommes dans l'ombre (TV: Pierre-Marie Rosa
- 2006: Du jour au lendemain : Magne
- 2006: Joséphine, ange gardien TV Series (1 Episode: "Remue-ménage"): Malot
- 2012: Queen of Montreuil
