= Natar Ungalaaq =

Canadian Inuk actor, filmmaker, and sculptor (born 1959)

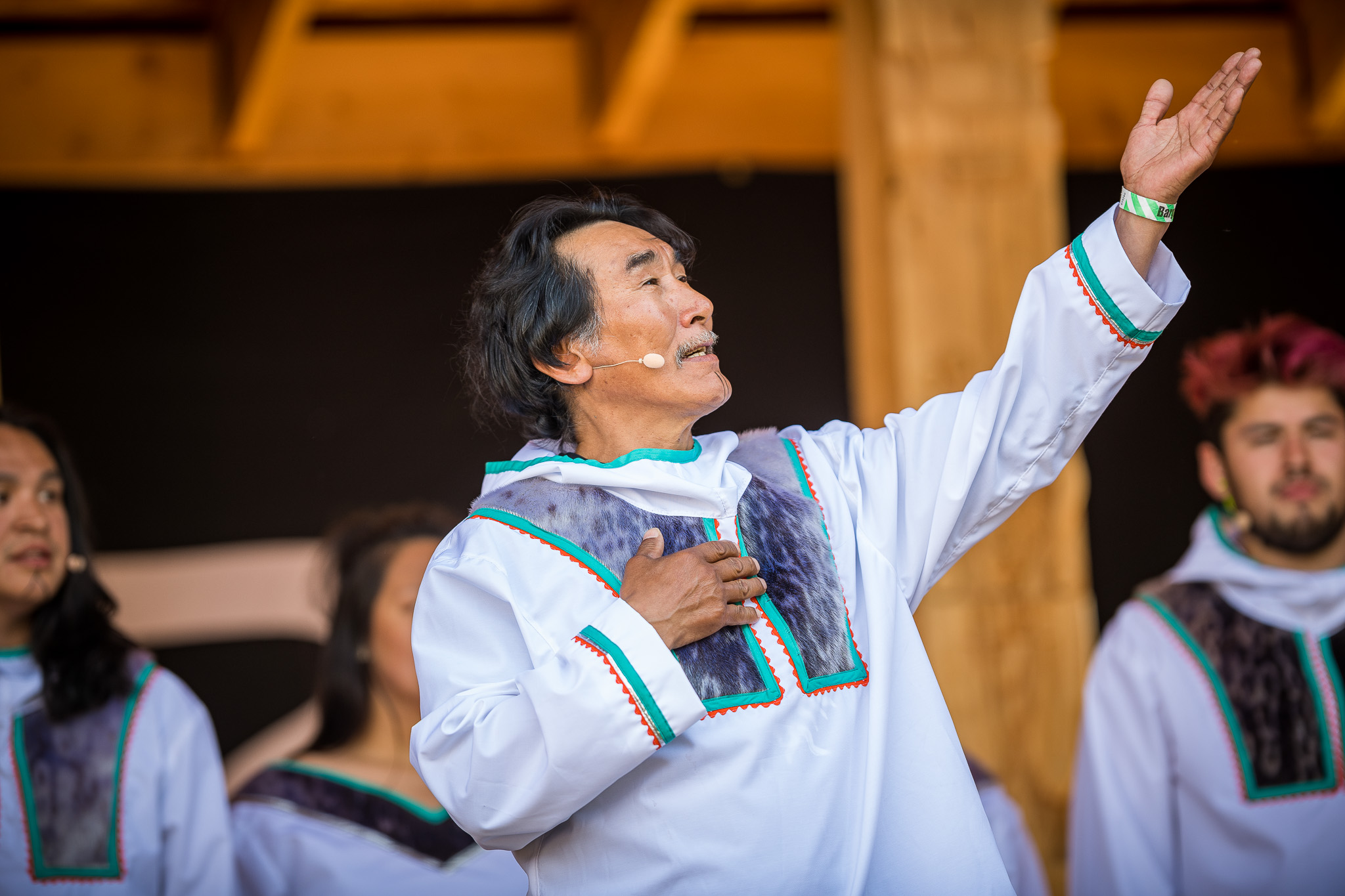
- Ungalaaq in 2019
- Born: Natar Ungalaaq; 1959 (age 66–67); Igloolik, Nunavut, Canada
- Years active: 1991–present

Natar Ungalaaq (Inuktitut syllabics: ᓇᑕᕐ ᐅᖓᓛᖅ, born 1959) is a Canadian Inuk actor, filmmaker and sculptor whose work is in many major collections of Inuit art. Before playing the lead roles in Atanarjuat: The Fast Runner (2001) and The Necessities of Life (Ce qu'il faut pour vivre) (2008), Ungalaaq played major roles in other Canadian and American films, including Kabloonak (1995), Glory & Honor (1998). He is also a producer and director of the Inuit Broadcasting Corporation.

Ungalaaq was the carving buddy of director Zacharias Kunuk. With funds raised by selling their handmade work, they bought their first camera gear in 1981, and started a production company in an Inuit community that didn't even have a TV.

Natar is also a renowned carver. He began when he was 9 or 10 years old, using his grandfather's tools. His carving in white soapstone, "Sedna with a Hairbrush 1985",is featured in the National Gallery of Canada's collection.

In 2016, he made his debut as a director, codirecting the film Searchers with Kunuk.

== Filmography ==
Year	Title	Role
1994	Frost Fire (TV)	Inuit
1994	Trial at Fortitude Bay	Tommy
1995	Kabloonak	Mukpullu
1998	Glory & Honor (TV)	Ootah
2001	Atanarjuat: The Fast Runner	Atanarjuat
2004	Sleep Murder (TV)	Jimmy Tarniq
2006	The Journals of Knud Rasmussen	Nuqallaq
2008	The Necessities of Life (Ce qu'il faut pour vivre)	Tiivii
2013	Maïna	Tadio
2016	Iqaluit	Noah
2018	The Grizzlies	Pete

== Awards ==
Ungalaaq was awarded the Best Actor award at the American Indian Movie Awards in 2002 for Atanarjuat. He won the Genie Award for Best Actor at the 29th Genie Awards for his role in Ce qu'il faut pour vivre. He also won the Jutra Award for Best Actor in a Leading Role and the Best Actor award at the Palm Springs International Film Festival for the same performance. In September 2009, Ungalaaq was presented with an award of distinction by the Nunavut Film Development Corporation. This award recognized Natar's body of work and his contribution to Nunavut's film community. In 2016, Ungalaaq won Best Indigenous Language Production (2016) for "Maliglutit (Searchers)" at the ImagineNATIVE Film + Media Arts Festival.
