= OBORO (Art Centre) =

Gallery/art center in Montreal, Canada

OBORO is an artist-run centre in Montréal created in 1982 by Daniel Dion and Su Schnee.

== History ==
For its first 10 years, OBORO was located on Saint-Laurent Boulevard in Montreal. In 1992, OBORO moved to its current premises on Berri Street.

In 1995, OBORO launched its New Media Lab. The Lab is a space devoted to new technologies, electronic media and telecommunications. In 2001, the Lab expanded and moved to the 2nd floor of the building.

Curator Dominique Fontaine notes that OBORO "plays a central role in Montreal's media art ecology.".

OBORO celebrated its 25th anniversary in 2009, and in the same year was recognized with distinction from The Conseil des arts de Montréal.

== Mandate ==
OBORO supports local, national and international artistic practices. The Centre organizes 5 to 10 major exhibitions each year, in addition to hosting training courses, residencies and conferences. OBORO's mandate stresses that the exchange of artistic ideas can lead to a more peaceful world. As the centre's mission statement notes: "OBORO’s objective is to promote awareness and dialogue within the art world and society at large and to contribute to a culture of peace."
