= Paul Dugdale =

British Circuit judge

Paul Damian Norwood Dugdale (born 24 June 1967) is a British Circuit judge.

He was educated at Canford School and King's College London (LLB). He was called to the bar at Gray's Inn in 1990 and served as a Recorder from 2005 to 2011.
