= Kinuso =

Kinuso ᑭᓄᓭᐤ (Cree) kinosêw (Cree)
- Hamlet
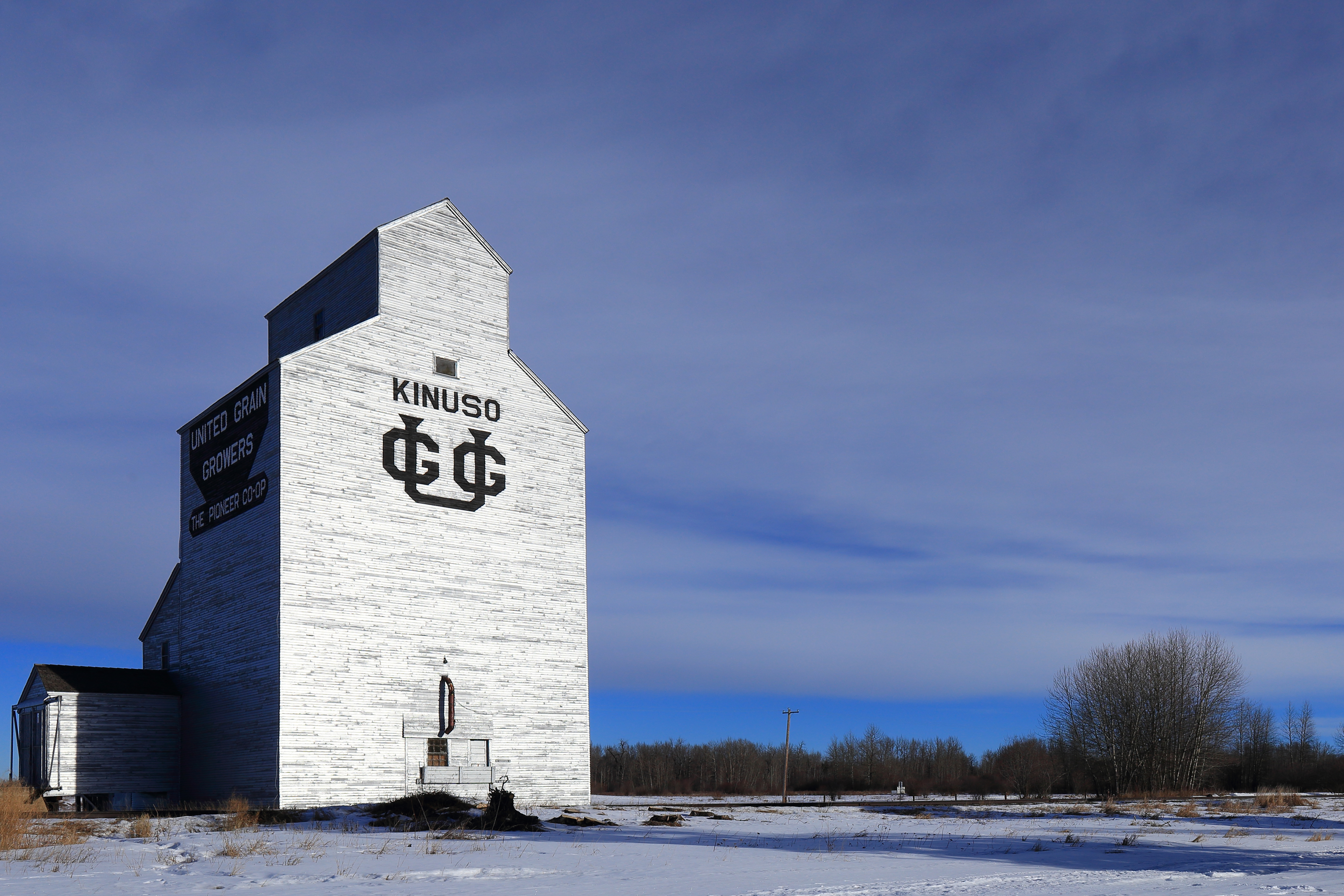

- Location within Alberta
- Coordinates: 55°19′59″N 115°26′1″W
- Country: Canada
- Province: Alberta
- Region: Northern Alberta
- Census Division: No. 17
- Municipal district: Big Lakes County

Government
  - Governing body: Big Lakes County Council

Area (2021)
  - Land: 0.58 km^{2} (0.22 sq mi)
- Elevation: 610 m (2,000 ft)

Population (2021)
  - Total: 150
  - Density: 257.8/km^{2} (668/sq mi)
- Time zone: UTC−06:00 (Alberta Time)
- Highways: 2
- Waterways: Lesser Slave Lake

Kinuso (Cree: ᑭᓄᓭᐤ, kinosêw) is a hamlet in northern Alberta, Canada within Big Lakes County, and surrounded by the Swan River First Nation reserve. It is located approximately 48 kilometres (30 mi) west of Slave Lake and 71 km east of High Prairie along Highway 2, south of the southern shore of Lesser Slave Lake.

The name Kinuso comes from the Cree word kinosêw 'fish'.

Kinuso was incorporated as a village until it dissolved on September 1, 2009.

== Demographics ==
Federal census population history
Year	Pop.	±%
1951	238	—
1956	306	+28.6%
1961	323	+5.6%
1966	376	+16.4%
1971	267	−29.0%
1976	305	+14.2%
1981	285	−6.6%
1986	282	−1.1%
1991	230	−18.4%
1996	258	+12.2%
2001	231	−10.5%
2006	219	−5.2%
2011	276	+26.0%
2016	182	−34.1%
2021	150	−17.6%
Source: Statistics Canada

In the 2021 Census of Population conducted by Statistics Canada, Kinuso had a population of 150 living in 73 of its 93 total private dwellings, a change of −17.6% from its 2016 population of 182. With a land area of 0.58 km^{2} (0.22 sq mi), it had a population density of 258.6/km^{2} (669.8/sq mi) in 2021.

As a designated place in the 2016 Census of Population conducted by Statistics Canada, Kinuso had a population of 182 living in 77 of its 102 total private dwellings, a change of −34.1% from its 2011 population of 276. With a land area of 0.59 km^{2} (0.23 sq mi), it had a population density of 308.5/km^{2} (798.9/sq mi) in 2016.

== See also ==
- List of communities in Alberta
- List of former urban municipalities in Alberta
- List of hamlets in Alberta
