= Caroline Monnet =

Canadian artist and director

- Born: April 3, 1985 (age 41); Quebec, Outaouais, Canada
- Education: University of Ottawa B.A.
- Website: carolinemonnet.ca

Caroline Monnet is an Anishinaabe French and Canadian contemporary artist and filmmaker known for her work in sculpture, installation, and film.

== Early life and education ==
Monnet is a multidisciplinary contemporary artist and filmmaker based in Montreal, Quebec, Canada. She grew up in both Douarnenez, France, and Outaouais, Quebec, Canada.

Her father emigrated to Canada from France, and Monnet has French citizenship through him. Her mother is Canadian and a member of the Kitigan Zibi First Nation.

She is the younger sister of artist and playwright Émilie Monnet.

Monnet has B.A in communications and sociology from the University of Ottawa and has studied at the University of Granada in Spain. She is an alumna of the Berlinale Talents and TIFF Talent Lab 2016.

== Career ==
Much of her work explores her Algonquin (Quebec) and French (France) heritage.

Monnet began her film career making short films. In 2010, Caroline Monnet released the short film Warchild, which made its debut at the Présence Authochtone Montréal First Peoples' Festival in August 2011. In 2012, Monnet released Gephyrophobia, a short film about two individuals sharing the Outaouais River that was featured at Talent Tout court at Cannes Film Festival. In 2014, Monnet's short film, The Black Case, was screened at the Vancouver Latin American Film Festival; this piece uses inspiration from real events to demonstrate the unbearable traumas experienced in residential schools.

She was nominated for a Canadian Screen Awards for Best Short Drama for Roberta (2014) and Best Short Documentary for Tshiuetin (2016). In 2015, Monnet released a short film, Mobilize, which uses old footage from the National Film Board of Canada archives, set to a score by Tanya Tagaq. She won a Golden Sheaf Award at the Yorkton Film Festival for Best Experimental Film for Mobilize.

Her first feature film entitled Bootlegger produced by Microclimat Films was selected for both CineMart and Berlinale Co-Production Market 2016. She was the first Canadian filmmaker selected for the 33rd session of the prestigious Cannes Film Festival's Cinéfondation residency in Paris (from October 2016 to February 2017). Monnet is also a founding member of the Aboriginal digital arts collective ITWÉ.

In 2017, Monnet released her documentary entitled Emptying the Tank through CBC.

In 2019, she was one of seven directors, alongside Kaveh Nabatian, Juan Andrés Arango, Sophie Deraspe, Karl Lemieux, Ariane Lorrain and Sophie Goyette, to direct segments of the anthology film The Seven Last Words (Les sept dernières paroles).

Monnet is one of the co-founders of daphne, the first Indigenous artist-run centre in Québec, along with Skawennati, Hannah Claus and Nadia Myre.

== Artistry and style ==
Monnet is primarily a self-taught artist. This allows her to approach her art with a level of freedom and naivety. Although Monnet wishes she had returned to school to pursue her arts, she strongly believes that the most valuable lessons are not taught in school. She is widely known for her sculpting, work in film and installation.

Monnet's work in film, painting, and sculpture deals with complex ideas around Indigenous identity and bicultural living through the examination of cultural histories. She is interested in themes of identity, representation, and modernity. Monnet has made a signature for working with industrial materials, combining the vocabulary of popular and traditional visual culture with the tropes of modernist abstraction to create unique hybrid forms.

== Exhibitions ==
Her works have been exhibited at the Palais de Tokyo (Paris) and Haus der Kulturen der Welt (Berlin), as part of Rencontres Internationales (Paris/Berlin/Madrid), Axenéo7, Plug in ICA, Arsenal Montréal, Arsenal Contemporary NY, Walter Phillips Gallery, Winnipeg Art Gallery, McCord Museum, and Museum of Contemporary Art (Montréal) among others.

== Awards ==
- Canadian Screen Awards for Best Short Drama for Roberta (2014)
- Best Short Documentary for Tshiuetin (2016)
- Golden Sheaf Award at the Yorkton Film Festival for Best experimental film for Mobilize (2016)

== Filmography ==
Movie	Year
Warchild	2010
Gephyrophobia	2012
Roberta	2014
The Black Case	2014
Tshiuetin	2016
Emptying the Tank	2018
Bootlegger	2021
Pidikwe (Rumble)	2025
