= Hannah Claus =

Indigenous Canadian visual artist

- Born: February 7, 1969 (age 57); Fredericton, New Brunswick, Canada
- Education: B.F.A, Ontario College of Art and Design M.F.A., Concordia University
- Known for: Installation, visual art
- Board member of: Aboriginal Curatorial Collective (Vice-President) Montreal Arts Council (Member)
- Children: 2
- Awards: Eiteljorg Contemporary Art Fellowship
- Website: www.hannahclaus.net

Hannah Claus (born February 7, 1969) is a multidisciplinary visual artist of English and Kanien'kehá:ka (Mohawk) ancestries and is a member of the Mohawks of the Bay of Quinte First Nation.

Claus' installations produce sensory environments that highlight time, place, and elements and her artwork explores the complexities of themes such as community, identity, modernization, and relationships.

== Biography ==
Hannah Claus (Kanien'kehá:ka and English heritage) was born on February 7, 1969, in Fredericton, New Brunswick, Canada and is a member of Kenhtè:ke [Tyendinaga, Mohawk of the Bay of Quinte].^{[1][2]} She lived with her family (parents, 2 brothers and a sister) in Fredericton and Saint John, New Brunswick. Claus moved to Ottawa, Ontario in 1988, completing a B.A. Honours in English Literature from the University of Ottawa (1988-1992); and then to Toronto in 1993, where she enrolled in the Visual Arts programme at the Ontario College of Art and Design (OCAD). She graduated with honours from OCAD in 1997. In 2001, Claus moved to Montreal, Quebec, to complete her Master of Fine Arts at Concordia University (2001-2004). She continues to live and work in Tiohtià:ke, Kanien’kehá:ka territory, with her common-law partner and two children.^{[3][4]}

Concurrent with her artistic practice, Claus has always been actively involved in local artistic communities. While in Toronto, she was a working member of the board of the artist-run centre, A-Space (1998-2001); and in Montreal, Centre d’art Optica (2005-2007). She was on the board of the Aboriginal Curatorial Collective, an Indigenous-led non-profit organization that supports Indigenous curators, from 2013 to 2018, serving as vice-president from 2015-2017.^{[5]} She left in 2018 to take on new responsibilities as a board member of the Conseil des arts de Montréal (CAM), where she led the formation of the Indigenous Arts Committee, the hiring of the Indigenous arts project officer and the creation of Indigenous arts programming for CAM. She continues to serve as the liaison between the Board and the Indigenous Arts Committee. In 2019, Claus co-founded daphne, the first Indigenous-led artist-run centre of Tiohtià:ke, with fellow artists, Skawennati, Nadia Myre and Caroline Monnet. She remains an active member of the board.

Professionally, Claus was hired as artistic director of Axenéo7, an artist-run centre in Gatineau QC in 2007 and commuted weekly between Montreal and Ottawa/Gatineau. She left this position in 2009 and taught contemporary Indigenous art as an adjunct professor/part-time instructor at Concordia University (2009-2011) and McGill University (2011-2012); and also as a sessional lecturer at Institut Kiuna College in Odanak, Quebec (2012-2020).^{[6][7]} In 2020, Claus was hired for a full-time position as Assistant Professor, Frameworks and Interventions in Studio Art Practices, in the Department of Studio Arts at Concordia University, Montreal. Throughout this time, since 1999, Claus has been working as a professional artist, exhibiting her installations throughout Canada, in the United States, Europe and New Zealand.

== Education ==
Hannah Claus obtained her Associate's degree from the Ontario College of Art and Design with Honors in Toronto, Canada 1997. During a presentation for her "trade-treaty-territory" exhibition, Claus stated she studied both drawing and painting as well as sculpture. She has expressed her rejection of how art school only emphasizes concepts and ideas, not so much beauty. Still desiring the "aesthetic appeal of painting," she chose installation art as her practice instead. Claus went on to pursue her Masters of Fine Arts in Studio Arts at Concordia University in Montreal, Quebec, Canada in 2004.

== Selected works ==
"Cloudscape" (2012)

"Cloudscape" is a suspended installation and solo exhibit at the Modern Fuel Artist-Run Centre, Ontario. The installation is created from reprographic film, thread, and PVA glue, and the process of the installation required three-dimensional programming. Claus' work reflects the Haudenosaunee creation story with the Sky-Woman. The Sky-Woman was a pregnant and celestial woman who fell from the Sky People, Karionake. She is responsible for the creation of human life on earth. The suspended white discs hang in cloud-like form, and are meant to mimic what the Sky-Woman's home must have looked like before she descended down to earth. The artist's "clouds" dominate the exhibit and enable the viewer to participate with the artwork by being surrounded and "destabilized" by it. The cloud-like forms stand to evoke community and creativity, and each individual white disc blend together to erect multiple massive clouds. Critic Justin Santelli of the Queen's University Journal claims Claus' work as an "incredibly unique piece, and it deserves your attention."

"Water song" (2014)

"Water song" is a suspended installation piece, a part of the group exhibition "Inaabiwin" in the Ottawa Art Gallery, Ontario. In Anishnaabemowin, inaabiwin means “movement of light," and Claus captures this through her thin acetate discs moving slowly to reflect the light. This artwork is an installation, meaning the art dominates the space it resides in. "Water song" is composed of digital print on acetate, thread, PVA glue, and plexiglass. Suspended from the ceiling hang threads holding the thin acetate discs that contain images of rivers, branches, and other pictures of nature on them. Her inspiration is drawn from the relationships with the rivers that flow through the Miami Tribe, the Gesgapegia’jg, Getnig, Tlapataqanji’jg, and Sipug. The installation's shape is meant to mimic the sound waves of a traditional Mi'kmaw water song, that "gives thanks for the rivers and oceans." This traditional song was gifted to Claus by Tracey Metallic, Glenda Wysote-LaBillois and Victoria Labillois of Listuguj, all Pugwalesg singers. Claus also pays homage to the Haudenosaunee's wampum belt; she stresses the continuity and unification of rivers, similar to the coexistence principles and symbols of the wampum belt.

"Words that are lasting" (2018)

In 2018, Hannah Claus was chosen as the creator of the Indigenous art installation contest at Queen's University Law building in Kingston, Ontario. The materials comprised in this artwork are translucent and frosted acrylic sheets, and this installation is the first time she has ever physically represented the wampum belt. Authentic wampum belts are created from tubular beads found from Atlantic coast seashells. The beaded belts were used primarily by the Indigenous peoples of the Eastern Woodlands "for ornamental, ceremonial, diplomatic, and commercial purposes." Her belts hang suspended from the ceiling of the MacDonald Hall atrium. Six of the belts are Haudenosaunee Confederacy belts: Everlasting Tree, Dish and One Spoon, Ojibwa Friendship, Old Fort, Council Fire and Kahswentha or Two Row. Claus invented the seventh belt to honor the Kanienkehá:ka, the Algonquin, and the Mississauga nations, and these nations inhabit the area of which the University stands. Claus illuminates the symbol of peace, coexistence, and agreement through this installation. Her artwork is meant to be reflected to the University law students, faculty, and staff as a reminder of history and to value these "living" treaties.

"Trade is ceremony" (2019)

"Trade is ceremony" was displayed as part of Claus' "trade-treaty-territory" exhibition at the Dunlop Art Gallery in Regina, Saskatchewan. The art piece is composed of copper ball headpins and wool blanket.

Her inspiration is drawn from the illegible hand writing in the North West Company's registers and provides a view into the Indigenous world perspective during the early fur trade in the 1500s. Even as a French and English speaking woman, it was difficult for her to decipher the words and phrases denoted on each register. She emphasizes how arduous the task of trading must have been for her ancestors. Each art piece of the "trade-treaty-territory" exhibition highlights an element of the earth, and she depicts the element of fire by placing the copper lines in a "central fire-like form" radiating outward. Claus interacts with light, shadows, and "piece together an atemporal space critical of Western ideologies and systems." The artwork itself stands as a symbol of peace between the Indigenous nations and the French. Claus asks the viewers to "enact relations, exchange words and knowledge, and share resources, the foundations for peaceful coexistence."

== Selected exhibitions ==
Solo exhibitions:

- "Question de temps" Place Ville Marie, Montreal, Quebec 2013
- "Cloudscape" Modern Fuel ARC, Ontario, Canada Jan 11, 2014-Feb 22, 2014
- "Our minds are one" National Gallery of Canada, Ottawa Sept 20, 2014-Jan 4, 2015
- "Akikpautik/kanatso" L'Imagier Art Centre, Gatineau, Quebec 2016
- "Hochelaga rock" McGill Campus Montreal, Quebec Oct. 21-Nov 19, 2017
- "Earth. sea. sky. constellations for my relations" MAI (Montreal Arts Interculturels) Feb.15-Mar.17, 2018
- "Spatial codifications" YYZ Toronto, Ontario Sept. 28-Nov. 30, 2019
- "Trade-treaty-territory" Dunlop Sherwood Gallery Regina, Saskatchewan, Canada Jan 17-Mar 13 2020
- "There's a reason for our connection" McCord Museum, Montreal, Quebec Mar 7-Aug 2019

Group exhibitions:

- "Sentier art3" Belle Rivière Park, Mirabel, Quebec July 30-Aug 10, 2014
- "Reading the Talk" Robert McLaughlin Gallery, Oshawa, Ontario Sept. 20, 2014-Jan. 4, 2015
- "Territoire (Land)" Louise-et-Reuben-Cohen Art Gallery, Moncton, New Brunswick Oct. 25-Dec. 17 2017
- "In/visible: Body as Reflective Site" Visual Arts Centre at the McClure Gallery, Montreal, Quebec June 7–29, 2019
- "Red Embers," Allan Gardens Conservatory, Toronto, Ontario June 8-Oct 3, 20
- "Undomesticated" Koffler Centre of the Arts, Toronto, Ontario Sept. 18-Nov. 2019
- "AYEMIYEDAN NISIN (Dialogue 3)" Rouyn-Noranda Exhibition Center, Rouyn-Noranda, Quebec June 7-Sept 29, 2019
- "Voices of the World" Montreal Museum of Fine Arts, Montreal, Quebec Sept 28-Nov 30 2019
- "Inaabiwin" Ottawa Art Gallery, Ottawa, Ontario Oct 4, 2019-Jan 19, 2020
- "Blurring the Line" Eiteljorg Museum, Indianapolis, Indiana, United States Nov. 16 to Feb. 2, 2019
- "Àbadakone / Continuous Fire / Feu continuel" National Gallery of Canada, Ottawa, Ontario Nov 8, 2019- Apr 5, 2020
- Radical Stitch, MacKenzie Art Gallery (2022).

== Collections ==
Hannah Claus' work is included in:

- Allan Gardens Conservatory
- Canada Council Art Bank
- City of Montreal
- Department of Global Affairs
- Dunlop Art Gallery
- Eiteljorg Museum
- Koffler Centre of the Arts
- L’Imagier Art Centre
- McClure Gallery
- McCord Museum
- Museum of Art of Canada
- National Gallery of Canada
- Ottawa Art Gallery
- Place Ville Marie
- Rouyn-Noranda Exhibition Center

== Honors and awards ==
Claus was selected for the Queen's University Law building art contest in Kingston, Ontario where she created the piece "Words that are lasting" in 2018. In 2019, Hannah Claus was selected for the Eiteljorg Contemporary Art Fellowship. Claus and five other artists were chosen to receive a $25,000 award and produce a permanent collection for the Eiteljorg Museum of American Indians and Western Art.

== Publications ==
- Rethinking Professionalism: Women and Art in Canada (1850-1970) is a 2012 book by Kristina Huneault and Janice Anderson that features Hannah Claus. This in-depth study examines the changes "to the infrastructure of the art world" that has resulted in the "powerful discourse of professionalization" that began to occur in the 19th century. This book focuses on the history of women and art in Canada and celebrates the progress of female artists.
- Reading the talk: Michael Belmore, Hannah Claus, Patricia Deadman, Keesic Douglas, Vanessa Dion Fletcher, Melissa General (2014) is a catalog explores the artworks from the "trade-treaty-territory" exhibition and how the art pieces in this exhibition explore distinct indigenous perspectives on the history of treaties" in Canada. Artists denote their interpersonal relationships, understandings of one another, as well as fundamental "Indigenous ontology."
- Inaabiwin (2018) is a catalog for the Inaabiwin exhibition at the Ottawa Art Gallery. This catalog stands as an introduction to the exhibition, and delves into the artists' interactions with colonization and navigation with Indigenous relationships with nature. Hannah Claus, Meryl McMaster, Greg Staats, Tanya Lukin Linklater, Scott Benesiinaabandan are the featured artists and "reclaim ways of being and knowing" after post-contact.

== See also ==
- Native American Women in the arts
- Visual Arts by indigenous peoples of the Americas
- List of Native American artists
