= List of Canadian films of 1995 =

This is a list of Canadian films which were released in 1995:

Title	Director	Cast	Genre	Notes
Bach's Fight for Freedom	Stuart Gillard	Ted Dykstra, Kyle Labine, Eric Peterson	Short drama	Canada-Czech co-production; made for DVD release
Baseball Girls	Lois Siegel		Documentary	
Black List (Liste noire)	Jean-Marc Vallée	Michel Côté, Geneviève Brouillette	Drama	Jean-Marc Vallée's first feature
Blood and Donuts	Holly Dale	Gordon Currie, Helene Clarkson	Comedy/horror	
Bones of the Forest	Heather Frise & Velcrow Ripper		Documentary	Genie Award - Feature Documentary
The Champagne Safari	George Ungar	Charles Bedaux	Documentary	Genie Award - Feature Documentary
Crying Freeman	Christophe Gans	Mark Dacascos, Julie Condra, Rae Dawn Chong	Action	Canada-France co-production
Curtains	Stephanie Morgenstern & Mark Morgenstern	Stephanie Morgenstern, Maxim Roy	Short drama	
Curtis's Charm	John L'Ecuyer	Maurice Dean Wint, Callum Keith Rennie	Comedy-drama	Based on a short story by Jim Carroll; Genie Award - Musical score
Draghoula	Bashar Shbib		Comedy/horror	
Eldorado	Charles Binamé	Pascale Bussières, Pascale Montpetit, Isabel Richer	Drama	
The End	Chris Landreth		Computer-animated short	Academy Award nominee
The End of the World in Four Seasons	Paul Driessen		Animated short	
Enigmatico	David Mortin, Patricia Fogliato		Documentary	
The Feeler	Colleen Murphy	Randy Hughson, Victoria Snow	Short drama	
Fiction and Other Truths: A Film About Jane Rule	Lynne Fernie, Aerlyn Weissman	Jane Rule	Documentary	
Gold Diggers: The Secret of Bear Mountain	Kevin James Dobson	Christina Ricci, Anna Chlumsky	Adventure drama	
Hearts of Hate	Peter Raymont		Documentary	
Hiroshima	Koreyoshi Kurahara & Roger Spottiswoode	Kenneth Welsh, Ken Jenkins, Colin Fox	Drama	Made for TV; Canada-Japan co-production
The Home for Blind Women	Sandra Kybartas	Helen Carscallen, Susan Kottmann	Short drama	Genie Award winner for Best Theatrical Short Film
House	Laurie Lynd	Daniel MacIvor	Drama	Based on a one-man play by Daniel MacIvor
Iron Eagle IV	Sidney J. Furie	Louis Gossett Jr. Jason Cadieux	Action	Made with U.S. financing
Johnny Mnemonic	Robert Longo	Keanu Reeves, Dina Meyer, Ice-T, Dolph Lundgren, Henry Rollins	Futuristic cyber-punk drama	William Gibson adaptation; Golden Reel Award; made with U.S. financing
Little Criminals	Stephen Surjik	Brendan Fletcher, Myles Ferguson	Crime	Made for TV
Live Bait	Bruce Sweeney	Tom Scholte, Kevin McNulty, David Lovgren, Babz Chula	Comedy-drama	
The Lost Garden: The Life and Cinema of Alice Guy-Blaché	Marquise Lepage	Alice Guy-Blaché	National Film Board documentary	Prix Gémeaux winner
Magic in the Water	Rick Stevenson	Mark Harmon, Joshua Jackson, Harley Jane Kozak, Sarah Wayne	Family film	Genie Awards – Cinematography, Overall Sound; made with U.S. financing
Magical Flowers (Les Fleurs magiques)	Jean-Marc Vallée	Marc-André Grondin, André Champagne, Geneviève Angers, Geneviève Rioux	Short drama	
Margaret's Museum	Mort Ransen	Helena Bonham Carter, Clive Russell, Kate Nelligan, Kenneth Welsh, Craig Olejnik	Drama	Canada-U.K. co-production
The Michelle Apartments	John Pozer	Henry Czerny, Mary Beth Rubens, Daniel Kash, Peter Outerbridge	Black comedy	
National Lampoon's Senior Trip	Kelly Makin	Tommy Chong, Matt Frewer, Valerie Mahaffey, Kevin McDonald, Fiona Loewi	Teen comedy	Made with U.S. financing
Never Talk to Strangers	Peter Hall	Rebecca De Mornay, Antonio Banderas, Dennis Miller, Len Cariou, Harry Dean Stanton	Thriller	Canada-German co-production made with U.S. financing
Night Terrors	Tobe Hooper	Robert Englund, Zoe Trilling, Alona Kimhi, Juliano Mer-Khamis	Supernatural horror	Canada-Egypt co-production
Odilon Redon, or The Eye Like a Strange Balloon Mounts Toward Infinity	Guy Maddin	Jim Keller, Caelum Vatnsdal, Brandy Bayes	Short drama	
Once in a Blue Moon	Philip Spink	Cody Serpa, Simon Baker, Mike MacDonald, Deanna Milligan	Children's adventure	
Rude	Clement Virgo	Maurice Dean Wint, Rachel Crawford, Clark Johnson, Richard Chevolleau	Drama	Screened at the 1995 Cannes Film Festival
Screamers	Christian Duguay	Peter Weller, Roy Dupuis, Jennifer Rubin	Sci-fi / Horror	Philip K. Dick adaptation; Canada-Japan co-production made with U.S. financing
Skin Deep	Midi Onodera	Melanie Nicholls-King, Keram Malicki-Sánchez	Drama co-produced with the National Film Board	Direct to DVD
Soul Survivor	Stephen Williams	George Harris, Peter Williams, Clark Johnson	Drama	
The Sphinx (Le Sphinx)	Louis Saia	Marc Messier, Céline Bonnier, Serge Thériault, Éric Hoziel, Vittorio Rossi, Sylvie Drapeau, Pierre Claveau, Micheline Bernard	Comedy	
The Thief and the Cobbler	Richard Williams	voices Vincent Price, Matthew Broderick, Jennifer Beals, Jonathan Winters	Animated feature	
Too Much Is Enough	Richard Brouillette	Gilles Groulx	National Film Board documentary	A film about the controversial Marxist Quebec filmmaker, Gilles Groulx
Use Once and Destroy	John L'Ecuyer		Short documentary	
Water Child (L'Enfant d'eau)	Robert Ménard	David La Haye, Marie-France Monette, Gilbert Sicotte	Drama	Genie Award - Actor (la Haye)
When Night Is Falling	Patricia Rozema	Pascale Bussières, Henry Czerny, Rachel Crawford	Drama	Entered into the 45th Berlin International Film Festival
Who's Counting?	Terre Nash	Marilyn Waring	National Film Board documentary	Based on the book If Women Counted
Zigrail	André Turpin	André Charlebois, Ariane Cordeau, Dorothée Berryman, Sonia Vigneault	Drama	

== See also ==
- 1995 in Canada
- 1995 in Canadian television
