= Sound and Beauty =

Sound and Beauty is the omnibus title of two plays by American playwright David Henry Hwang. Hwang's fourth play, The House of Sleeping Beauties, was adapted from Yasunari Kawabata's novella House of the Sleeping Beauties (1961). It tells the story of the narrator of that novella investigating the brothel that inspired the work. His fifth play, The Sound of a Voice, is a ghost story inspired by Japanese films and folk tales. The one-act plays were produced together and premiered on November 6, 1983 Off-Broadway at the Joseph Papp Public Theater. It was directed by John Lone, with Lone and Victor Wong.

The Sound of a Voice was later adapted as an opera of the same name (which encompassed two short works), with libretto by Hwang and music by Philip Glass. It was also adapted as a film, Sound of a Voice, written by Lane Nishikawa and Natsuko Ohama, and directed by Susan Hoffman.

The two plays are published as part of Trying to Find Chinatown: The Selected Plays by Theatre Communications Group and also in an acting editions published separately by Dramatists Play Service.
