= Toronto International Film Festival Award for Best Canadian Short Film =

Annual film award

The Toronto International Film Festival Award for Best Canadian Short Film, formerly also known as the NFB John Spotton Award, is an annual film award, presented by the Toronto International Film Festival to a film judged to be the best Canadian short film of the festival. As of 2017, the award is sponsored by International Watch Company and known as the "IWC Short Cuts Award for Best Canadian Short Film".

== Winners ==
Year	Film	Director	ACCT honours	Ref
1989	Stealing Images	Alan Zweig		
1989	Justine's Film (Le film de Justine)	Jeanne Crépeau		
1990	Shaggie: Letters from Prison	Janis Cole		
1990	New Shoes	Ann Marie Fleming		
1991	The Making of Monsters	John Greyson		
1991	The Learning Path	Loretta Todd		
1991	Unknown Soldiers	Veronika Soul		
1992	Letters of Transit (Les Sauf-conduits)	Manon Briand		
1992	Blue	Don McKellar		
1992	The Fairy Who Didn't Want to Be a Fairy Anymore	Laurie Lynd	Best Live Action Short Drama winner	
1992	Moose Jaw: There's a Future in Our Past	Rick Hancox		
1992	My Niagara	Helen Lee		
1993	Save My Lost Nigga Soul	Clement Virgo	Best Theatrical Short Film nominee	
1993	Me, Mom and Mona	Mina Shum		
1994	Frank's Cock	Mike Hoolboom		
1994	Technilogic Ordering	Philip Hoffman		
1994	Make Some Noise	Andrew Munger		
1995	Reconstruction	Laurence Green		
1995	Odilon Redon, or The Eye Like a Strange Balloon Mounts Toward Infinity	Guy Maddin		
1995	Use Once and Destroy	John L'Écuyer		
1996	Letters from Home	Mike Hoolboom		
1996	Sin Cycle	Jack Cocker, Ben Famiglietti		
1996	Lodela	Philippe Baylaucq		
1997	Cotton Candy	Roshell Bissett		
1997	bp: pushing the boundaries	Brian Nash	Best Short Documentary nominee	
1998	When Ponds Freeze Over	Mary Lewis	Best Live Action Short Drama winner	
1999	Discharge (Décharge)	Patrick Demers		
1999	Karaoke	Stéphane Lafleur		
2000	The Hat (Le Chapeau)	Michèle Cournoyer		
2000	Ernest	Keith Behrman		
2001	FILM(dzama)	Deco Dawson		
2002	Blue Skies	Ann Marie Fleming		
2003	Aspiration	Constant Mentzas		
2004	Man. Feel. Pain.	Dylan Akio Smith		
2005	Big Girl	Renuka Jeyapalan	Best Live Action Short Drama nominee	
2005	There's a Flower in My Pedal	Andrea Dorfman		
2006	The Days (Les Jours)	Maxime Giroux		
2007	Pool	Chris Chong Chan Fui		
2008	Block B	Chris Chong Chan Fui		
2008	Next Floor	Denis Villeneuve	Best Live Action Short Drama winner	
2009	Danse Macabre	Pedro Pires	Best Live Action Short Drama winner	
2009	The Armoire	Jamie Travis		
2010	Little Flowers (Les Fleurs de l'âge)	Vincent Biron		
2011	Doubles with Slight Pepper	Ian Harnarine	Best Live Action Short Drama winner	
2011	No Words Came Down	Ryan Flowers, Lisa Pham		
2011	Of Events (D'aléas)	Mathieu Tremblay		
2012	Keep a Modest Head (Ne crâne pas sois modeste)	Deco Dawson		
2012	Crackin' Down Hard	Mike Clattenburg		
2013	Noah	Walter Woodman, Patrick Cederberg	Best Live Action Short Drama winner	
2013	The Chaperone 3D	Fraser Munden	Best Short Documentary nominee	
2013	Yellowhead	Kevan Funk		
2014	The Weatherman and the Shadowboxer	Randall Okita		
2015	Overpass	Patrice Laliberté	Best Live Action Short Drama nominee	
2015	Bacon and God's Wrath	Sol Friedman	Best Short Documentary winner	
2016	Mutants	Alexandre Dostie	Best Live Action Short Drama winner	
2017	Pre-Drink	Marc-Antoine Lemire	Best Live Action Short Drama nominee	
2017	The Tesla World Light	Matthew Rankin	Best Animated Short nominee	
2018	Brotherhood (Ikhwène)	Meryam Joobeur		
2018	Fauve	Jérémy Comte	Best Live Action Short Drama winner	
2019	Delphine	Chloé Robichaud		
2019	The Physics of Sorrow	Theodore Ushev		
2020	Benjamin, Benny, Ben	Paul Shkordoff	Best Live Action Short Drama nominee	
2021	Angakusajaujuq: The Shaman's Apprentice	Zacharias Kunuk	Best Animated Short winner	
2021	Nuisance Bear	Jack Weisman, Gabriela Osio Vanden	Best Short Documentary nominee	
2022	Simo	Aziz Zoromba	Best Live Action Short Drama winner	
2022	Same Old	Lloyd Lee Choi		
2023	Motherland	Jasmin Mozaffari	Best Live Action Short Drama winner	
2024	Are You Scared to Be Yourself Because You Think That You Might Fail?	Bec Pecaut	Best Live Action Short Drama nominee	
2025	The Girl Who Cried Pearls (La jeune fille qui pleurait des perles)	Chris Lavis, Maciek Szczerbowski	Best Animated Short nominee	
2025	A Soft Touch	Heather Young		
2026	Fight Kid	Michael Del Monte		
2026	Almost Pink	Justine Prince		
