= 16th Genie Awards =

1996 Canadian film awards ceremony

- Date: January 14, 1996
- Site: Maison Radio-Canada, Montreal
- Hosted by: Pascale Bussières; René Homier-Roy; Mary Walsh

Highlights
- Best Picture: The Confessional (Le Confessionnal)
- Most awards: The Confessional
- Most nominations: The Confessional

The 16th Genie Awards were held on January 14, 1996, to honour films released in 1995. The ceremony took place in Montreal at Société Radio-Canada's Studio 42.

For the first time, the ceremony was not broadcast live on any television network, instead taking place in the afternoon of January 14; two 90-minute post-award specials aired in prime time to publicize the award highlights. The English special on CBC Television was hosted by actress Mary Walsh, while the French special on Radio-Canada was hosted by actor Pascale Bussières and broadcaster René Homier-Roy.

It was the first of two Genie Award ceremonies held in 1996. Normally the 16th Genie Award ceremony would have been held in the late fall of 1995, but it was delayed until early 1996. The 17th Genie Awards were held in November 1996, returning to the traditional scheduling of the award ceremony. Beginning with the 19th Genie Awards in 1999, however, the award scheduling returned to the winter again, and remained scheduled as such.

== Award winners and nominees ==
Motion Picture	Direction
The Confessional (Le Confessionnal) — Denise Robert; Black List (Liste noire) — Marcel Giroux; Magic in the Water — Rick Stevenson, Matthew O'Connor; Margaret's Museum — Christopher Zimmer, Mort Ransen, Claudio Luca, Steve Clark-Hall; Rude — Damon D'Oliveira, Karen King	Robert Lepage, The Confessional (Le Confessionnal); Charles Binamé, Eldorado; Mort Ransen, Margaret's Museum; Jean-Marc Vallée, Black List (Liste noire); Clement Virgo, Rude
Actor in a leading role	Actress in a leading role
David La Haye, Water Child (L'Enfant d'eau); Lothaire Bluteau, The Confessional (Le Confessionnal); Matthew Ferguson, Eclipse; Clive Russell, Margaret's Museum; Peter Williams, Soul Survivor	Helena Bonham Carter, Margaret's Museum; Pascale Bussières, Eldorado; Pascale Bussières, When Night Is Falling; Pascale Montpetit, Eldorado; Isabel Richer, Eldorado
Actor in a supporting role	Actress in a supporting role
Kenneth Welsh, Margaret's Museum; Robert Brouillette, Eldorado; Clark Johnson, Rude; David Fox, When Night Is Falling; Aubert Pallascio, Black List (Liste noire)	Kate Nelligan, Margaret's Museum; Anne-Marie Cadieux, The Confessional (Le Confessionnal); Rachael Crawford, Rude; Marie Gignac, The Confessional (Le Confessionnal); Pascale Montpetit, Eclipse
Screenplay	Best Short Film
Mort Ransen and Gerald Wexler, Margaret's Museum; Sylvain Guy, Black List (Liste noire); Clement Virgo, Rude; Stephen Williams, Soul Survivor	Magical Flowers (Les fleurs magiques) — Jean-Marc Vallée; The End of the World in Four Seasons — Marcy Page and Paul Driessen; Movements of the Body: "1st Movement: The Gesture" — Wayne Traudt; Off Key — Karethe Linaae and Wade Ferley; You Love Me I Hate You — Myra Fried and Rosamund Owen
Best Feature Length Documentary	Best Short Documentary
The Champagne Safari — George Ungar; Motherland: Tales of Wonder — Helene Klodawsky and Signe Johansson; Narmada: A Valley Rises — Ali Kazimi; Silent Witness — Harriet Wichin and Christine York; Who's Counting? Marilyn Waring on Sex, Lies and Global Economics — Kent Martin and Terre Nash	Fiction and Other Truths: A Film About Jane Rule — Aerlyn Weissman, Lynne Fernie and Rina Fraticelli; Abby, I Hardly Knew Ya — Peter Raymont and Lindalee Tracey; Enigmatico — David Mortin and Patricia Fogliato; The Shaper — Martin Schliessler and Bill Sheppard; Time Is on My Side — Jacques Holender
Art Direction/Production Design	Cinematography
François Laplante, The Confessional (Le Confessionnal); William Fleming and David McHenry, Margaret's Museum; André Guimond, Eldorado; Clyde Klotz and Michael O'Connor, Magic in the Water; Nilo Rodis-Jamero, Johnny Mnemonic	Thomas Burstyn, Magic in the Water; Alain Dostie, The Confessional (Le Confessionnal); Pierre Gill, Black List (Liste noire); Vic Sarin, Margaret's Museum; Barry Stone, Rude
Costume Design	Editing
Nicoletta Massone, Margaret's Museum; Crystine Booth, Once in a Blue Moon; Michèle Hamel, Eldorado; Barbara Kidd, The Confessional (Le Confessionnal); Linda Muir, When Night Is Falling	Michael Pacek, Dance Me Outside; Michel Arcand, Eldorado; Emmanuelle Castro, The Confessional (Le Confessionnal); Susan Maggi, Rude; Jean-Marc Vallée, Black List (Liste noire)
Overall Sound	Sound Editing
Michael McGee, Paul A. Sharpe, Kelly Cole and Dean Giammarco, Magic in the Water; Keith Elliott, Peter Kelly, Daniel Pellerin and Ross Redfern, Dance Me Outside; Don White, Douglas Ganton, Leslie Shatz and Scott Purdy, Johnny Mnemonic; Jean-Claude Laureux, Jo Caron and Hans Peter Strobl, The Confessional (Le Confessionnal); Gavin Fernandes, Luc Boudrias, Daniel Masse and Michel Descombes, Black List (Liste noire)	Steve Munro, Andy Malcolm, Michael Pacek, Peter Winninger and Michael Werth, Dance Me Outside; Nick Berry, Jérôme Décarie, Jacques Plante, Diane Boucher and Antoine Morin, The Confessional (Le Confessionnal); Diane Boucher, François Dupire, Martin Pinsonnault, Louis Dupire and Alice Wright, Black List (Liste noire); Marc Chiasson, Cal Shumiatcher, Anke Bakker, Jacqueline Cristianini, Sean Kelly and Sheena Macrae, Magic in the Water; Steve Munro, Tim Roberts, Andy Malcolm, Paul Shikata and Paul Germann, The Michelle Apartments
Achievement in Music: Original Score	Special awards
Milan Kymlicka, Margaret's Museum; Luc Aubry and Serge Arcuri, Black List (Liste noire); Aaron Davis and John Lang, Rude; Richard Grégoire, L'Enfant d'eau (Water Child); Mark Korven, The Michelle Apartments	Claude Jutra Award: The Confessional (Le Confessionnal) — Robert Lepage; Golden Reel Award: Johnny Mnemonic
