= 1995 Toronto International Film Festival =

Annual Canadian film festival

- Festival poster
- Opening film: The Confessional
- Closing film: Devil in a Blue Dress
- Location: Toronto, Ontario, Canada
- Hosted by: Toronto International Film Festival Group
- Festival date: September 7, 1995–September 16, 1995
- Language: English
- Website: tiff.net
- 1996 1994

The 20th Toronto International Film Festival (TIFF) took place in Toronto, Ontario, Canada between September 7 and September 16, 1995. The Confessional by Robert Lepage was selected as the opening film and Devil in a Blue Dress by Carl Franklin was selected as the closing film.

The 1995 festival notably marked the first time that TIFF published its film schedule to the World Wide Web in addition to the conventional paper calendar.

== Awards ==
| Award | Film | Director |
|---|---|---|
| People's Choice Award | Antonia's Line | Marleen Gorris |
| Metro Media Award | La Cérémonie | Claude Chabrol |
| Best Canadian Feature Film | Live Bait | Bruce Sweeney |
| Best Canadian Feature Film - Special Jury Citation | Curtis's Charm | John L'Ecuyer |
| Best Canadian Feature Film - Special Jury Citation | Rude | Clement Virgo |
| Best Canadian Short Film | Reconstruction | Laurence Green |
| Best Canadian Short Film - Special Jury Citation | Odilon Redon, or The Eye Like a Strange Balloon Mounts Toward Infinity | Guy Maddin |
| Best Canadian Short Film - Special Jury Citation | Use Once and Destroy | John L'Ecuyer |
| FIPRESCI International Critics' Award | Desolation Angels | Tim McCann |
| FIPRESCI International Critics' Award | Eggs | Bent Hamer |

== Programme ==
=== Gala Presentations ===
| English title | Original title | Director(s) | Production country |
|---|---|---|---|
| The Confessional | Le Confessionnal | Robert Lepage | Canada |
| The Crossing Guard | | Sean Penn | United States |
| Cry, the Beloved Country | | Darrell Roodt | South Africa, United States |
| Devil in a Blue Dress | | Carl Franklin | United States |
| The Grass Harp | | Charles Matthau | United States |
| Guantanamera | | Tomás Gutiérrez Alea, Juan Carlos Tabío | Cuba |
| Leaving Las Vegas | | Mike Figgis | United States |
| Margaret's Museum | | Mort Ransen | Canada |
| Mighty Aphrodite | | Woody Allen | United States |
| My Mother's Courage | | Michael Verhoeven | Germany, United Kingdom |
| Nelly and Mr. Arnaud | Nelly et M. Arnaud | Claude Sautet | France |
| Nobody Loves Me | Keiner liebt mich | Doris Dörrie | Germany |
| The Run of the Country | | Peter Yates | United States |
| The Stars Fell on Henrietta | | James Keach | United States |
| Steal Big Steal Little | | Andrew Davis | United States |
| To Die For | | Gus Van Sant | United States |
| Unstrung Heroes | | Diane Keaton | United States |

=== Special Presentations ===
Michelangelo Antonioni's film Beyond the Clouds had been slated to premiere in the Special Presentations program, but was withdrawn from the festival due to not being complete.

| English title | Original title | Director(s) | Production country |
|---|---|---|---|
| Angels and Insects | | Philip Haas | United Kingdom, United States |
| Blue in the Face | | Paul Auster, Wayne Wang & Harvey Wang | United States |
| Carrington | | Christopher Hampton | United Kingdom |
| Fallen Angels | | Wong Kar-wai | Hong Kong |
| Flirt | | Hal Hartley | United States |
| Four Rooms | | Quentin Tarantino, Robert Rodriguez, Alexandre Rockwell, Allison Anders | United States |
| The Freethinker | | Peter Watkins | Sweden |
| Georgia | | Ulu Grosbard | United States, France |
| The Grotesque | | John-Paul Davidson | United Kingdom |
| In the Bleak Midwinter | | Kenneth Branagh | United Kingdom |
| The Journey of August King | | John Duigan | United States |
| Kristin Lavransdatter | | Liv Ullmann | Norway |
| A Month by the Lake | | John Irvin | United Kingdom |
| Things to Do in Denver When You're Dead | | Gary Fleder | United States |
| Ulysses' Gaze | Το βλέμμα του Οδυσσέα | Theodoros Angelopoulos | Greece, France, Italy |
| Voices | | Malcolm Clarke | United States |
| War of the Buttons | | John Roberts | United Kingdom, France |
| Wings of Courage | | Jean-Jacques Annaud | United States, France |

=== Contemporary World Cinema ===
| English title | Original title | Director(s) | Production country |
|---|---|---|---|
| Antonia's Line | | Marleen Gorris | Netherlands |
| The Blue Veiled | Rūsarī-Ābī | Rakhshān Banietemad | Iran |
| Canadian Bacon | | Michael Moore | United States |
| The Celluloid Closet | | Rob Epstein, Jeffrey Friedman | United States |
| Cold Fever | Á köldum klaka | Friðrik Þór Friðriksson | Iceland |
| Frankie Starlight | | Michael Lindsay-Hogg | United States, Ireland |
| Flamenco | | Carlos Saura | Spain |
| French Twist | Gazon maudit | Josiane Balasko | France |
| Korea | | Cathal Black | Ireland |
| Land and Freedom | | Ken Loach | United Kingdom, Spain, Germany |
| Lisbon Story | | Wim Wenders | Portugal, Germany |
| The Neon Bible | | Terence Davies | United Kingdom |
| The Monster | Il Mostro | Roberto Benigni | Italy |
| Notes from Underground | | Gary Alan Walkow | United States |
| The Promise | Das Versprechen | Margarethe von Trotta | Germany, France, Switzerland |
| Total Eclipse | | Agnieszka Holland | United Kingdom |
| The Usual Suspects | | Bryan Singer | United States |
| Who Killed Pasolini? | Pasolini, un delitto italiano | Marco Tullio Giordana | Italy |

=== Perspective Canada: Features ===
| English title | Original title | Director(s) | Production country |
|---|---|---|---|
| Black List | Liste noire | Jean-Marc Vallée | Canada |
| Blood and Donuts | | Holly Dale | Canada |
| The Champagne Safari | | George Ungar | Canada |
| Curtis's Charm | | John L'Ecuyer | Canada |
| House | | Laurie Lynd | Canada |
| House of Pain | | Mike Hoolboom | Canada |
| If Only I Were an Indian | | John Paskievich | Canada |
| Live Bait | | Bruce Sweeney | Canada |
| The Michelle Apartments | | John Pozer | Canada |
| Once in a Blue Moon | | Philip Spink | Canada |
| Reconstruction | | Laurence Green | Canada |
| Rude | | Clement Virgo | Canada |
| Skin Deep | | Midi Onodera | Canada |
| Soul Survivor | | Stephen Williams | Canada |
| The Suburbanators | | Gary Burns | Canada |
| Voices of Change | | Barbara Doran, Lyn Wright | Canada |
| The War Between Us | | Anne Wheeler | Canada |
| Use Once and Destroy | | John L'Ecuyer | Canada |
| Water Child | L'Enfant d'eau | Robert Ménard | Canada |
| Who's Counting? Marilyn Waring on Sex, Lies and Global Economics | | Terre Nash | Canada |
| Zigrail | | André Turpin | Canada |

=== Perspective Canada: Shorts ===
| English title | Original title | Director(s) | Production country |
|---|---|---|---|
| Al Tasmim | | Selwyn Jacob | Canada |
| Cramps | | Penny Gay | Canada |
| Movements of the Body: "1st Movement: The Gesture" | | Wayne Traudt | Canada |
| My Name is Kahentiiosta | | Alanis Obomsawin | Canada |
| Odilon Redon, or The Eye Like a Strange Balloon Mounts Toward Infinity | | Guy Maddin | Canada |
| Picoti Picota | | Manon Briand | Canada |
| Pleasure Film (Ahmed's Story) | | Ann Marie Fleming | Canada |
| A Portrait of Arshile | | Atom Egoyan | Canada |
| Prey | | Helen Lee | Canada |
| Reconstruction | | Laurence Green | Canada |

=== First Cinema ===
| English title | Original title | Director(s) | Production country |
|---|---|---|---|
| Heavy | | James Mangold | United States |
| Loaded | | Anna Campion | New Zealand |
| The White Balloon | Badkonake sefid | Jafar Panahi | Iran |
| The Young Poisoner's Handbook | | Benjamin Ross | United Kingdom, Germany, France |

=== Planet Africa ===
| English title | Original title | Director(s) | Production country |
|---|---|---|---|
| Africa, My Africa | Afrique, mon Afrique | Idrissa Ouédraogo | Burkina Faso, France |
| Le Franc | | Djibril Diop Mambéty | Switzerland, France, Senegal |
| Guimba the Tyrant | Guimba, un tyrant, une époque | Cheick Oumar Sissoko | Mali, Burkina Faso, France |
| Haramuya | | Drissa Toure | Burkina Faso, France |
| The Keeper | | Joe Brewster | United States |
| The Killers | | Tanya Hamilton | United States |
| Sidney's Chair | | Roberto Bangura | United Kingdom |
| Vintage: Families of Value | | Thomas Allen Harris | United States |
| What My Mother Told Me | | Frances-Anne Solomon | United Kingdom |

=== Latin American Panorama ===
| English title | Original title | Director(s) | Production country |
|---|---|---|---|
| Carlota Joaquina, Princess of Brazil | Carlota Joaquina, Princesa do Brazil | Carla Camurati | Brazil |
| Carmen Miranda: Bananas Is My Business | | Helena Solberg | Brazil |
| Cinema of Tears | Cinema de Lágrimas | Nelson Pereira dos Santos | Brazil |
| Don't Die Without Telling Me Where You're Going | No te mueras sin decirme adónde vas | Eliseo Subiela | Argentina |
| The Eyes of the Scissors | El Censor | Eduardo Calcagno | Argentina |
| Jonah and the Pink Whale | Jonás y la ballena rosada | Juan Carlos Valdivia | Mexico, Bolivia |
| No Return Address | Sin remitente | Carlos Carrera | Mexico |
| Two Crimes | Dos crímenes | Roberto Sneider | |

=== Asian Horizons ===
| English title | Original title | Director(s) | Production country |
|---|---|---|---|
| Blackbirds at Bangpleng | Ka Wao Thi Bang Phleng | Niratisai Kanjareuk | Thailand |
| Cyclo | Xích Lô | Tran Anh Hung | Vietnam |
| Maiden Rose | | Xie Yang | China |

=== Hungarian Rhapsodies ===
| English title | Original title | Director(s) | Production country |
|---|---|---|---|
| Countdown | Visszaszámlálás | Pál Erdöss | Hungary |
| A Light-Sensitive Story | Fényérzékeny történet | Pál Erdöss | Hungary |
| The Princess | Adj király katonát | Pál Erdöss | Hungary |
| Tolerance | Gondviselés | Pál Erdöss | Hungary |
| Twilight | Szürkület | Gyorgy Feher | Hungary |
| The Wondrous Voyage of Kornel Esti | Esti Kornél csodálatos utazása | Jozsef Pacskovszky | Hungary |

=== Director's Spotlight ===
| English title | Original title | Director(s) | Production country |
|---|---|---|---|
| Almanac of Fall | Őszi almanach | Béla Tarr | Hungary |
| Damnation | Kárhozat | Béla Tarr | Hungary |
| Family Nest | Családi tűzfészek | Béla Tarr | Hungary |
| The Outsider | Szabadgyalog | Béla Tarr | Hungary |
| The Prefab People | Panelkapcsolat | Béla Tarr | Hungary |
| Satan's Tango | Sátántangó | Béla Tarr | Hungary |

=== Midnight Madness ===
| English title | Original title | Director(s) | Production country |
|---|---|---|---|
| Crying Freeman | | Christophe Gans | France, Canada, Japan |
| The Day of the Beast | El día de la bestia | Álex de la Iglesia | Spain, Italy |
| Eko Eko Azarak: Wizard of Darkness | | Shimako Sato | Japan |
| An Evil Town | | Richard Sears | United States |
| Gamera: Guardian of the Universe | Gamera: Daikaijū Kūchū Kessen | Shūsuke Kaneko | Japan |
| Mute Witness | Stumme Zeugin | Anthony Waller | United Kingdom, Germany, Russia |
| Screamers | | Christian Duguay | Canada, United States, Japan |
| Synthetic Pleasures | | Iara Lee | United States |
| To Kill a Dead Man | | Alexander Hemming | United Kingdom |
| Tokyo Fist | | Shinya Tsukamoto | Japan |
| Trailer Camp | | Jenni Olson | United States |

=== Dialogues: Talking with Pictures ===
A program which asked nine prominent filmmakers to select a film that had been a key influence on their own filmmaking career.

| English title | Original title | Director(s) | Selected by |
|---|---|---|---|
| Antonio das Mortes | | Glauber Rocha | Jonathan Demme |
| Five Easy Pieces | | Bob Rafelson | Doris Dörrie |
| Freaks | | Tod Browning | David Cronenberg |
| A Hard Day's Night | | Richard Lester | Hal Hartley |
| Late Spring | Banshun | Yasujirō Ozu | Hou Hsiao-hsien |
| Limelight | | Charlie Chaplin | Liv Ullmann |
| A Man Escaped | Un condamné à mort s'est échappé | Robert Bresson | Agnieszka Holland |
| Le Samourai | | Jean-Pierre Melville | John Woo |
| Shadows of Forgotten Ancestors | Tini zabutykh predkiv | Sergei Parajanov | Paul Cox |

=== Unverified program ===
Films that are known to have screened, but have not yet been verified which program they were in.

- The Addiction by Abel Ferrara
- Angel Baby by Michael Rymer
- Augustin by Anne Fontaine
- Bombay by Mani Ratnam
- Brother of Sleep by Joseph Vilsmaier
- Bye-Bye by Karim Dridi
- La Cérémonie by Claude Chabrol
- Denise Calls Up by Hal Salwen
- Desolation Angels by Tim McCann
- Don't Forget You're Going to Die (N'oublie pas que tu vas mourir) by Xavier Beauvois
- Eggs by Bent Hamer
- Go Now by Michael Winterbottom
- Good Men, Good Women by Hou Hsiao-hsien
- Harvest Home by Carlos Siguion-Reyna
- Hate (La Haine) by Mathieu Kassovitz
- Hello Cinema (Salaam Cinema) by Mohsen Makhmalbaf
- Institute Benjamenta by Brothers Quay
- It's A Long Way to the Sea (Xagoroloi Bohudoor) by Jahnu Barua
- The Last Supper by Stacy Title
- Love Letter by Shunji Iwai
- Maborosi by Hirokazu Koreeda
- Madagascar Skin by Chris Newby
- A Moslem (Musulmanin) by Vladimir Khotinenko
- Nothing Personal by Thaddeus O'Sullivan
- On the Beat by Ning Ying
- Once Upon a Time...This Morning (Kalla khrung nueng... muea chao nee) by Bhandit Rittakol
- Peculiarities of the National Hunt by Aleksandr Rogozhkin
- Persuasion by Roger Michell
- Someone Else's America by Goran Paskaljevic
- Stonewall by Nigel Finch
- Time of Love (Nobat-e âšeqi) by Mohsen Makhmalbaf
- Under the Domim Tree by Eli Cohen
- Welcome to the Dollhouse by Todd Solondz

== Pop Culture ==
A portion of the documentary film "American Movie" was filmed at the Sutton Hotel during the festival. The star of the documentary, Mark Borchardt, was attempting to get his script noticed by industry higher-ups. The footage was cut from the final documentary but was made available on the DVD's deleted scenes.
