= The Sound of a Voice =

- Original language: English
- Written by: David Henry Hwang

Premiere
- Date: 1983
- Place: Joseph Papp Public Theater

The Sound of a Voice is a 1983 play by American playwright David Henry Hwang. Hwang's fifth play, it is an original ghost story inspired by Japanese folk stories, films, and Noh theater. The play was first produced as part of the production Sound and Beauty on November 6, 1983 Off-Broadway at the Joseph Papp Public Theater. It was directed by and featured John Lone.

Composer Philip Glass and Hwang adapted it for the opera The Sound of a Voice in 2003. That same year, Susan Hoffman directed a film adaptation entitled Sound of a Voice adapted by actor-screenwriters Lane Nishikawa and Natsuko Ohama. The film was developed through the American Film Institute's Directing Workshop for Women and premiered at the Mill Valley Film Festival on October 4, 2002.

It is published as part of Trying to Find Chinatown: The Selected Plays and Between Worlds: Contemporary Asian-American Plays by Theatre Communications Group and also in an acting edition published by Dramatists Play Service.
