= The Antigonish Review =

Canadian literary magazine

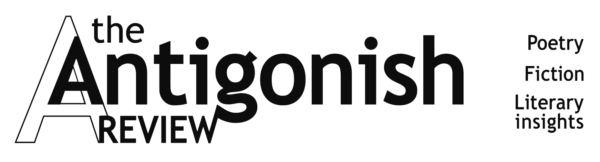

- Winter 2022 cover
- Editor: Douglas Smith
- Former editors: Thomas Hodd
- Frequency: Quarterly
- Founded: 1970
- Company: St. Francis Xavier University
- Country: Canada
- Based in: Antigonish, Nova Scotia, Canada
- Language: English
- Website: antigonishreview.com
- ISSN: 0003-5661
- OCLC: 1785445

The Antigonish Review is a quarterly literary magazine publishing new and established contemporary literary fiction, reviews, non-fiction articles/essays, translations, and poetry. Since 2005, the magazine runs an annual competition, the Sheldon Currie Short Fiction Contest. The winner of the inaugural Sheldon Currie Prize was Nicholas Ruddock. Since 2000, the magazine has also run a poetry competition, the Great Blue Heron Poetry Contest.

The Antigonish Review was established in 1970 with long-term editor-in-chief R. J. MacSween, who was succeeded by George Sanderson. Thomas Hodd was editor until 2023. Doug Smith is currently editor.

Under MacSween's and Sanderson's editorship there was staunch support of communications theorist Marshall McLuhan from his early days.

The Antigonish Review is credited with nurturing writing talent in Eastern Canada. Besides fiction, poetry, and interviews, it publishes translations, book reviews, and review essays.
