= Landscapes of Memory =

1996 film directed by José Araújo

- Portuguese: O Sertão das Memórias
- Directed by: José Araújo
- Release date: 1996
- Country: Brazil
- Language: Portuguese

Landscapes of Memory (Portuguese: O Sertão das Memórias), is a 1996 Brazilian documentary film directed by José Araújo. It tells the stories of Antero Marques Araújo and Maria Emilce Pinto. It premiered in the Discovery program at the 1996 Toronto International Film Festival, and later screened in the 1997 Sundance Film Festival -where it won the award for the Best Latino-American Film-, the Singapore International Film Festival and the 4th International Kerala Film Festival.

== Plot ==
O Sertão das Memórias is a black-and-white film that tells the story of two Sertanejos, the inhabitants of Sertão. Maria is the female reincarnation of Jesus, representing the strength of the Sartanejo women. She invites the Beatas (holy women) on a mission of prayer for which they journey through the countryside, witnessing social unrest among the population. Maria meets the hero of the peasants, the strong worker Antero whose history intermingles with hers. Through mythical dreams, visions, and stories heard along their journey, we witness the unfolding of Biblical prophecy in which Old Testament texts mingle with the folktales of the Sertão. The film aims to show how people try to find strength in myths, art, and religion when faced with the harsh realities of life.
