= Croisière blanche =

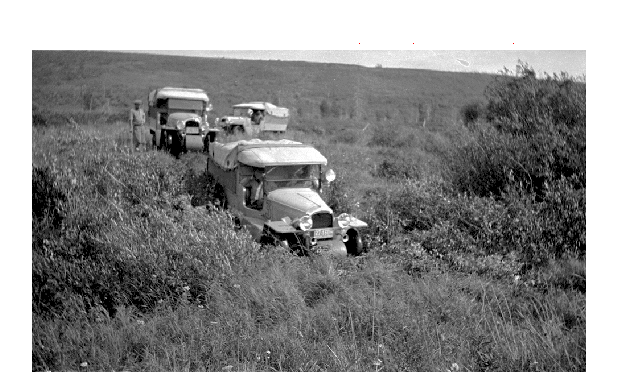
Bedaux Expedition in the Peace River Country (August 1934)

The Croisière blanche (in Englishː white cruise or white expedition) was the fourth expedition organised by André Citröen on Charles Eugène Bedaux's initiative. It was also sometimes known as the Bedaux expedition of 1934 or the Bedaux Canadian Subarctic Expedition,

Its goal was to cross the wilderness of the northern parts of Alberta and northern British Columbia in Canada, while making a film, testing Citroën half-track vehicles and generating publicity for himself.

== Beginnings ==
=== The Citroëns ===
Bedaux was acquainted with car manufacturer Andre Citroën, who designed the Citroën-Kégresse equipped half-track trucks that were used on the expedition. Of the five Citroëns that the party used, two slid off cliffs and a third was used in a shot where it was put on a raft so as to meet a stick of dynamite and explode; however, the shot was ruined when the dynamite failed to explode and the truck floated downriver and was stuck in a sandbar. The last two Citroëns were abandoned near Halfway River. When the Alaska Highway was built in the 1940s, a Fort St. John man discovered the remains of these last two half-tracks and one was donated to the Western Development Museum in Moose Jaw, Saskatchewan.

Bedaux set off on this unusual excursion accompanied by more than a hundred people, including his wife Fern, his mistress (Bilonha Chiesa, an Italian Countess), and an Academy Award-winning film director from Hollywood, Floyd Crosby, who would later be praised for his work on High Noon. Also along for the trip were several dozen Alberta cowboys and a large film crew. To map the route of the expedition, the Canadian government sent along two geographers, Frank Swannell and Ernest Lemarque. The expedition started off at Edmonton, Alberta, on July 6, 1934, with the goal of traveling 1,500 miles (2,400 km) to Telegraph Creek, British Columbia. Much of the trip would have to be made through regions that were relatively uncharted and had no trails, let alone proper roads that would have made the going smoother for the expedition's vehicles.

=== Training camp in Jasper ===
In June 1934, Bedaux assembled the members of the expedition in Jasper, Alberta, for compulsory fitness training. Bedaux reported to the press that such training was necessary for what was sure to be a long and difficult trip, involving hiking, rafting and mountain climbing. However, no training sessions were accomplished as the members of the expedition were kept too busy attending champagne parties and formal dinners that were being held in their honor.

== The route ==
The expedition began at Edmonton, moved to Athabasca and Grande Prairie, and then into British Columbia to Dawson Creek, and Fort St. John. From there the expedition headed north to Montney and then northwest to Halfway River on to Whitewater Post over the Northern Rocky Mountains. From there, Bedaux had planned for the expedition to cross over the Sifton Pass, to Dease Lake and the Stikine River to Telegraph Creek, and ultimately the Pacific Ocean. However, this final leg of the trip was never completed.

== The journey ==
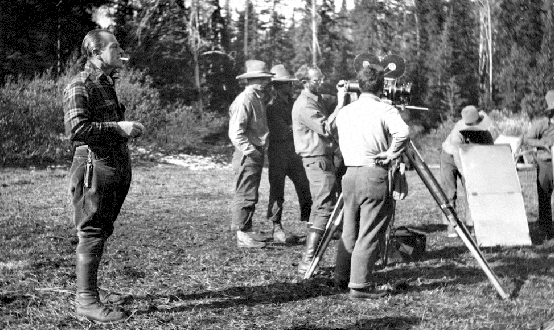
Charles Bedaux overseeing the film crew

After enjoying a champagne breakfast hosted by Edmonton's elite and parading down Jasper Avenue, the expedition was formally sent off by Alberta's Lieutenant Governor.

Just outside the city, it began to rain. Those dismal weather conditions would accompany the expedition through much of their trip. Despite the poor weather and road conditions, they made good progress, leaving Grande Prairie by July 12 and reaching the trail in British Columbia from Taylor to Fort St. John by the 17th.

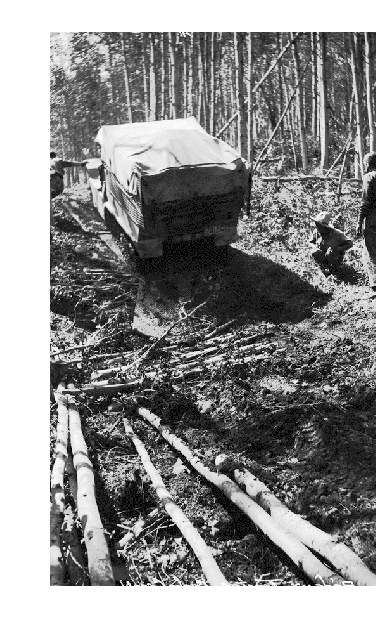
A Citroën-Kégresse half-track near Cache Creek

The party stayed in Fort St. John until the 22nd, purchasing supplies, repairing the Citroëns, hiring more cowboys and attending banquets. By then, Bedaux had come to the decision that the expedition needed to be more newsworthy than it already was, so he fired his radio operator and announced that the party would continue without a radio. Furthermore, he decided that the Citroëns were expendable and would create a bigger sensation if they were destroyed on film rather than simply making the trip intact. In August, two of the Citroëns were pushed over a 300-foot (91 m) cliff near Halfway River and a third was floated downriver for the unsuccessful explosion scene. Nevertheless, Bedaux's plan worked: Canadian and American newspapers carried the news that three of the cars had been lost and that some of the expedition members had barely escaped death in these terrible "accidents". The party was lauded for its bravery and determination to continue on despite this terrible setback.

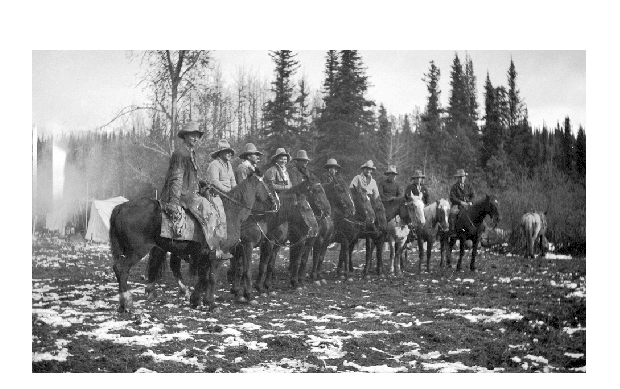
Bedaux Expedition cowboys

By mid-September, the papers were reporting that the expedition would reach its destination in October. But when the expedition arrived at Whitewater Pass, Frank Swannell, then one of the very few men who knew northern British Columbia well enough to be considered an expert on the terrain, advised Bedaux against traveling further through the snow-covered mountain passes. His advice was proven well founded when the party's horses began to die of diseases and the route simply proved too arduous to continue. On October 17, the Edmonton Journal reported that the party was turning back.

The party reached Hudson's Hope after nearly four months in the wilderness. A party was thrown in honor of their near achievement, which turned out to be one of the biggest celebrations that the town has ever thrown.

== Posterity ==
=== The movie ===
Crosby's footage disappeared only to be found decades later in a basement in Paris. A documentary, The Champagne Safari, based on this footage, was made in 1995 by filmmaker George Ungar.

A radio drama was produced by the Canadian Broadcasting Corporation "Champagne Safari". The radio-drama implied some shady ulterior motive for Bedaux's excursion into northern BC and the Far North, making reference to the fact that he had come to the same area previously, in 1926 and 1931.

=== Places named for Bedaux ===
- The Bedaux Pass at the head of the Muskwa River, in the Kwadacha Wilderness Provincial Park
