= Firebird 2015 AD =

- Directed by: David M. Robertson
- Screenplay by: Barry Pearson; Maurice Hurley; Biff McGuire
- Produced by: Glenn Ludlow
- Starring: Darren McGavin; Doug McClure
- Cinematography: Robert Fresco
- Edited by: Michael MacLaverty
- Music by: Paul Hoffert; Lawrence Shragge
- Distributed by: Roke Distributors
- Release dates: 18 September 1981 (Brentwood Corral 3 Drive-In, Calgary)
- Country: Canada

Firebird 2015 AD is a 1981 Canadian science fiction film directed by David M. Robertson and starring Darren McGavin and Doug McClure.

== Plot ==
In 2015, the U.S. government outlaws the distribution of gasoline to the public, reserving it only for the politicians, the military, and law enforcement. While this is implied to be due to a fuel shortage, later dialogue rebuffs this, stating that gasoline is in abundance. Civilians are also banned from owning or using any form of motor vehicle, and those who do are referred to as Burners, and this is shown to be a form of rebellion. Burners are monitored and dealt with harshly by the Department of Vehicle Control (DVC).

Red, a middle-aged Burner, drives a 1980 Pontiac Firebird Turbo Trans Am. His teenaged son Cameron (Robert Wisden), however, is not much of a car enthusiast and always raises the issue of how Red is breaking the law. Meanwhile, another Burner is planning on chauffeuring a senator to a conference, where he intends to make civilian use of motor vehicles legal again. While en route to pick up his passenger, though, the Burner is intercepted by a DVC squad led by McVain (Doug McClure). His subordinate Dolan, a quiet sociopath, blows the Burner away with a grenade launcher. Shana, another member of McVain's team, is appalled by this act and how McVain constantly overlooks the matter. Red takes Cameron for a ride to try to spark his interest in motor cars. They then meet up with Red's friend Indy, another Burner who drives a Plymouth Barracuda. While Red and he race through the desert to see whose car is faster, Cameron gets acquainted with Indy's frisky daughter, Jill, who makes repeated sexual advances on him while showing him how to drive her dune buggy. Red and Indy's race, however, is cut short when the DVC lays an ambush, but an over-anxious member fires too soon and the two make their getaway. Cameron and Jill head into a barn to have sex, but are caught by McVain's subordinates, who rough up Cameron and assault Jill before making off with her. Cameron limps his way home and tells Red and Indy what happened. They modify their cars for a raid on the DVC's campsite to rescue Jill.

Meanwhile, Shana, appalled at Jill's treatment, frees her and the two escape while the rest of the DVC people are run down by the Burners. The next day, Cameron and Jill decide to chauffeur the senator themselves in the Firebird, while Red gets acquainted with Shana.

== Cast ==
- Darren McGavin as Red
- Doug McClure as McVain
- George Touliatos as Indy
- Robert Wisden as Cam (as Robert Charles Wisden)
- Mary Beth Rubens as Jill
- Barbara Williams as Shana
- Alex Diakun as Dolan
- Lee Broker as Saunders
- Frank Pellegrino as Chance
- Bill Berry as Burner

== Release ==
Firebird 2015 AD was distributed in Canada by Roke Distributors and first released at Calgary's Brentwood Corral 3 Drive-In on September 18, 1981.

== Reception ==
From retrospective reviews, Claude Gaillard discussed the film in his book on postapocalyptic films stated that the film was "limp and brainless" and that "even connoisseurs of films so bad they become good will have a hard time enjoying [it]". A reviewer in TV Guide declared the film was only for car lovers, giving it one of four stars. The reviewer stated that the movie showed a "lack of intelligence and the filmmakers' lack of technical know-how".
