= Reconstruction (1995 film) =

1995 Canadian short film directed by Laurence Green

- Directed by: Laurence Green
- Written by: Laurence Green
- Cinematography: Laurence Green; André Abou-Jaoudé
- Edited by: Laurence Green
- Music by: Francis Bebey; Akowissa Koffigan; Akofa Akoussah; Ayawa Aladji
- Release date: May 1995
- Running time: 21 minutes
- Country: Canada

Reconstruction is a Canadian short documentary film, directed by Laurence Green and released in 1995. Made as a student film while Green was studying film at Concordia University, the film explores Green's own family history, including his discovery of the answer to the long-unaddressed family secret of what happened to his adopted sister who had simply disappeared from the family many years earlier.

The film premiered in May 1995 at Concordia University's Festival of Student Films. It was later screened at the 1995 Toronto International Film Festival, where it was named the winner of the Best Canadian Short Film award.
