= The House of Sleeping Beauties =

- Original language: English
- Written by: David Henry Hwang

Premiere
- Date: November 6, 1983
- Place: Joseph Papp Public Theater

The House of Sleeping Beauties is a 1983 play by American playwright David Henry Hwang. Hwang's fourth play, it is an adaptation of Yasunari Kawabata's novella House of the Sleeping Beauties. The play depicts Kawabata and how he might have come to have written the novella. The play was first produced as part of the production Sound and Beauty on November 6, 1983 Off-Broadway at the Joseph Papp Public Theater. It was directed by John Lone, with Victor Wong in the cast.

It is published as part of Trying to Find Chinatown: The Selected Plays by Theatre Communications Group. and also in an acting edition published by Dramatists Play Service.
