= The Eye, Like a Strange Balloon, Mounts Towards Infinity =

1882 lithograph by Odilon Redon

The Eye like a Strange Balloon Mounts toward Infinity
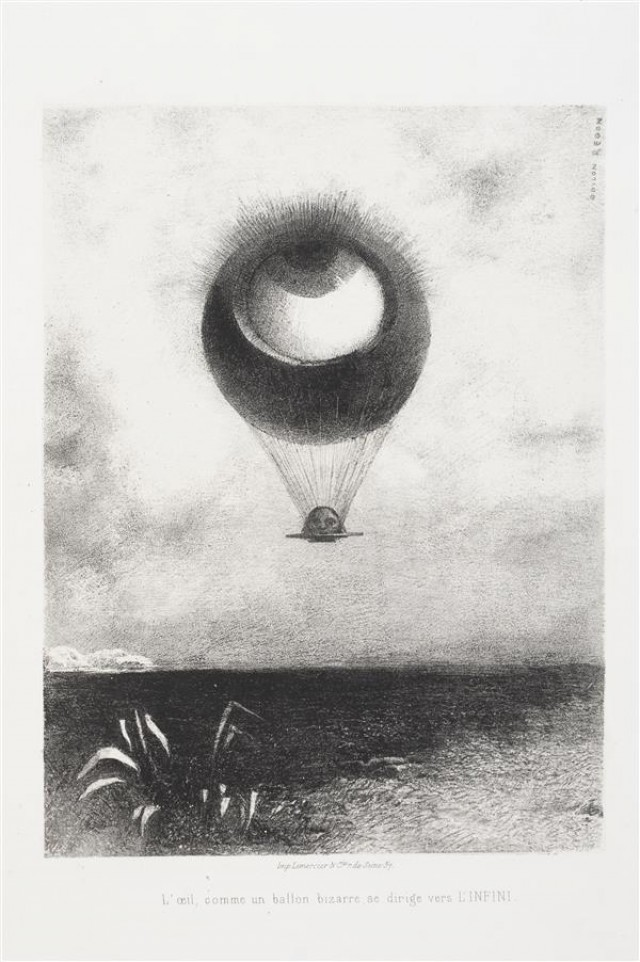
- Artist: Odilon Redon
- Year: 1882
- Medium: Lithograph on Chine-collé
- Dimensions: 25.9 cm × 19.6 cm (10.2 in × 7.7 in)
- Location: Los Angeles County Museum of Art

The Eye, Like a Strange Balloon, Mounts Towards Infinity is the name generally given in English to an 1882 lithograph by French artist Odilon Redon. It depicts a hot air balloon in the shape of an eye. The image was used in the first translation by Charles Baudelaire of Edgar Allan Poe's poetry.

== See also ==
- Odilon Redon, or The Eye Like a Strange Balloon Mounts Toward Infinity, 1995 short film by Canadian director Guy Maddin
- Enduring Love, 1997 novel by British writer Ian McEwan
