= The Sticky Side of Baklava =

- French: La face cachée du baklava
- Directed by: Maryanne Zéhil
- Written by: Maryanne Zéhil
- Produced by: Maryanne Zéhil
- Starring: Jean-Nicolas Verreault; Claudia Ferri; Raïa Haïdar; Geneviève Brouillette; Manuel Tadros; France Castel; Marcel Sabourin; Angèle Coutu; Michel Forget; Anick Lemay; Nathalie Cavezzali; Joseph Antaki; Natalie Tannous; Olivia Dandurand; Siham Kortas; Aïda Nader; Zenab Jaber
- Cinematography: Nathalie Moliavko-Visotzky
- Edited by: Dominique Fortin
- Music by: Benoît Charest
- Production company: Mia Productions
- Distributed by: Axia Films
- Release date: November 8, 2020 (Cinemania Film Festival)
- Running time: 88 minutes
- Country: Canada
- Language: French

The Sticky Side of Baklava (French: La face cachée du baklava) is a Quebec film recounting the story of a clash between Lebanese and Quebec cultures, as played out in the relationship between two sisters. It features Jean-Nicolas Verreault, Claudia Ferri, Raïa Haïdar and Geneviève Brouillette.

== Plot ==
The Sticky Side of Baklava takes a comedic look at cultural difference, as experienced by two sisters who leave Lebanon to settle in Montreal. Houwayda embraces the lifestyle and values of her new home, while Joelle holds onto her Lebanese traditions. When faced with an important life choice that will affect the people around her, Houwada questions the values of her past as well as her present.

== Cast ==
- Jean-Nicolas Verreault as Pierre
- Claudia Ferri as Houwayda
- Raïa Haïdar as Joëlle
- Geneviève Brouillette as Émilie
- Manuel Tadros as Jacques
- France Castel as Sylvie
- Marcel Sabourin as Guy
- Angèle Coutu as Geneviève
- Michel Forget as Jocelyn
- Anick Lemay as Isabelle
- Nathalie Cavezzali as Sophie
- Joseph Antaki as Jean
- Natalie Tannous as Maryse
- Olivia Dandurand as Mireille
- Siham Kortas as Renée
- Aïda Nader as Najla
- Zenab Jaber as Liliane

== Festivals ==
- World premiere at the Cinemania Film Festival
- Durban International Film Festival
