= Sin Cycle =

- Directed by: Jack Cocker; Ben Famiglietti
- Written by: Jack Cocker; Ben Famiglietti
- Produced by: Greg Smith; Anna Maria McRoberts; Denny Silverthorne
- Release date: April 29, 1996 (Kingston)
- Running time: 16 minutes
- Country: Canada
- Language: English

Sin Cycle is a Canadian short film, directed by Jack Cocker and Ben Famiglietti and released in 1996. Made as a student project for the film studies program at Queen's University, the film centres on a young man who is doing his laundry at a laundromat, and becomes disillusioned when he unexpectedly meets the actor who portrayed his favourite childhood television character, Mr. Rex, out of costume.

The film premiered on April 29, 1996, at a year-end screening of Queen's student short films. It was later screened at the 1996 Toronto International Film Festival, where it received an honorable mention from the Best Canadian Short Film award jury.
