= Gerald Wexler =

Canadian screenwriter

Gerald Wexler is a Canadian film and television screenwriter. He is most noted as cowriter with Mort Ransen of the 1995 film Margaret's Museum, for which they won the Genie Award for Best Screenplay at the 16th Genie Awards in 1996.

His other credits have included episodes of the television series Urban Angel, The Smoggies, Are You Afraid of the Dark? and The Hunger, and the television films Manuel, le fils emprunté and St. Urbain's Horseman.

He was born and raised in Outremont, Quebec, and is fluently bilingual.
