= Use Once and Destroy (film) =

- Directed by: John L'Ecuyer
- Written by: John L'Ecuyer
- Release date: September 1995 (TIFF)
- Running time: 10 minutes
- Country: Canada
- Language: English

Use Once and Destroy is a Canadian short film, written and directed by John L'Ecuyer and released in 1995. Created as a student project in L'Ecuyer's second year of film studies at Ryerson University, the film features L'Ecuyer narrating the story of his own prior experiences as a heroin addict.

Made for just $250, the film's genesis resulted from a magazine asking L'Ecuyer to write an article about his experiences as an addict.

The film premiered at the 1995 Toronto International Film Festival, where it received an honorable mention from the Best Canadian Short Film award jury. L'Ecuyer's feature film debut, Curtis's Charm, premiered at the same festival.

L'Ecuyer subsequently published a memoir of his experiences as a drug addict, also titled Use Once and Destroy, in 1998.
