= Sound of a Voice =

2002 short film

Sound of a Voice is a 2002 short film based upon the play The Sound of a Voice by American playwright David Henry Hwang. Susan Hoffman directed the film while participating in the American Film Institute's Directing Workshop for Women 2002.

The screenplay adaptation is by Hoffman and Masanubo Takaynagi. The film stars Lane Nishikawa and Natsuko Ohama.

The seventeen-minute film premiered at the Mill Valley Film Festival on October 4, 2003.
