= Once in a Blue Moon (1995 film) =

1995 film by Philip Spink

- Directed by: Philip Spink
- Written by: Philip Spink
- Produced by: Jane Charles; Sarah Duncan
- Starring: Cody Serpa; Simon Baker; Mike MacDonald; Deanna Milligan
- Cinematography: John Spooner
- Edited by: Frank Irvine
- Music by: Daryl Bennett; Jim Guttridge
- Production companies: Ark Films; Blue Moon Films
- Distributed by: Brainstorm Media
- Release date: September 7, 1995
- Running time: 96 minutes
- Country: Canada
- Language: English

Once in a Blue Moon is a Canadian children's adventure film, directed by Philip Spink and released in 1995. Set in 1967, the film centres on the suburban Piper family; after they take in indigenous orphan Sam (Simon Baker) as a foster child, he and the family's son Peter (Cody Serpa) decide to build a rocket in an attempt to travel to the Moon.

The cast also includes Mike MacDonald and Cheryl Wilson as Mr. and Mrs. Piper, and Deanna Milligan as their older daughter Emily.

The film premiered at the 1995 Toronto International Film Festival, before going into wider commercial release in 1996.

Crystine Booth received a Genie Award nomination for Best Costume Design at the 16th Genie Awards in 1996.
