= Mary Beth Rubens =

Canadian actress

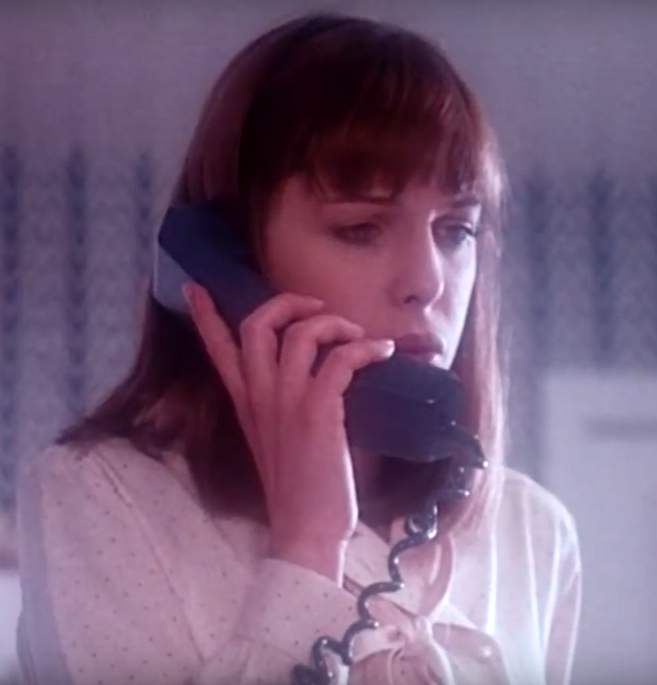
- Rubens in Prom Night (1980)
- Born: Mary Elizabeth Rubens; Kingston, Ontario, Canada
- Years active: 1980–present

Mary Elizabeth Rubens is a Canadian film, stage, and television actress, who made her feature film debut in Paul Lynch's slasher film Prom Night (1980). She subsequently appeared in Firebird 2015 AD (1981). She worked throughout the 1980s in television, guest-starring on Night Heat (1985–1987) and Alfred Hitchcock Presents (1987–1988). From 1989 to 1993, she had a leading role on the series E.N.G., for which she was nominated for a Gemini Award.

After a traumatic brain injury in the 1990s left Rubens with a permanent disability, she shifted focus from acting, and subsequently earned a degree in law & society from York University. In 2018, she appeared in Judith Thompson's stage production of After the Blackout, a play about, and starring, people with various disabilities.

== Early life ==
Rubens was born and raised in Kingston, Ontario, and has said she "comes from a family of farmers." She is of English, Irish, and Scottish descent, and was raised an Anglican. She began performing in stage plays as a child. Rubens attended Bishop's University in Lennoxville, Quebec, where she double-majored in biology and psychology, and was also active in the university's theatre club.

== Career ==
Rubens made her feature film debut in Paul Lynch's slasher film Prom Night (1980). She subsequently had a supporting role in Firebird 2015 AD (1981).

In 1987, she appeared in Souvenirs with Theatre Calgary. In 1990, Rubens was nominated for a Gemini Award for her performance in the pilot of E.N.G.. In 1995, she appeared in the film The Michelle Apartments.

After suffering a traumatic brain injury in the 1990s, Rubens was left with a permanent disability and temporarily retired from acting. She subsequently enrolled at York University, graduating with an honours degree in law & society.

In 2018, she returned to theater in the RARE Theatre Company's After the Blackout, a play by Judith Thompson, which featured a cast of performers with varying disabilities. Isabelle Perrone of BroadwayWorld noted that Rubens "approached her character seemingly with ease, playing the aged starlet with elegance."

== Filmography ==
=== Film ===
Year	Title	Role	Notes	Ref.
1980	Prom Night	Kelly Lynch		
1981	Firebird 2015 AD	Jill		
1985	Big Deal	Secretary		
1986	Perfect Timing	Judy		
1995	The Michelle Apartments	Madeleine		

=== Television ===
Year	Title	Role	Notes	Ref.
1980	The Littlest Hobo	Sally	Episode: "Second Chance"	
1985–1987	Night Heat	Jackie / Maria	2 episodes	
1987–1988	Alfred Hitchcock Presents	Alison / Beth	2 episodes	
1988	War of the Worlds	Marla	Episode: "Eye for an Eye"	
1989	Street Legal	Julie Lavoix	Episode: "Slipping Through the Cracks"	
1991	Tropical Heat	Margot / Lady Grace	2 episodes	
1992	Counterstrike	Marlene	Episode: "Cat in the Cradle"	
1989–1993	E.N.G.	Bobbi Katz	70 episodes Nominated—Gemini Award for Best Supporting Actress	
1995	Lonesome Dove: The Outlaw Years	Sadie	3 episodes	
1996	The Outer Limits	Fran Blake	Episode: "Unnatural Selection"	
1997	F/X: The Series	Bennett	Episode: "Spanish Harlem"	

== Select stage credits ==
Year	Title	Role	Notes	Ref.
1987	Souvenirs	Vicki	Theatre Calgary	
1987	Golden Girls	Sue Kinder	Theatre Calgary	
2018	After the Blackout	Roxy	RARE Theatre Company, Toronto	
