= John L'Ecuyer =

Canadian film and television director

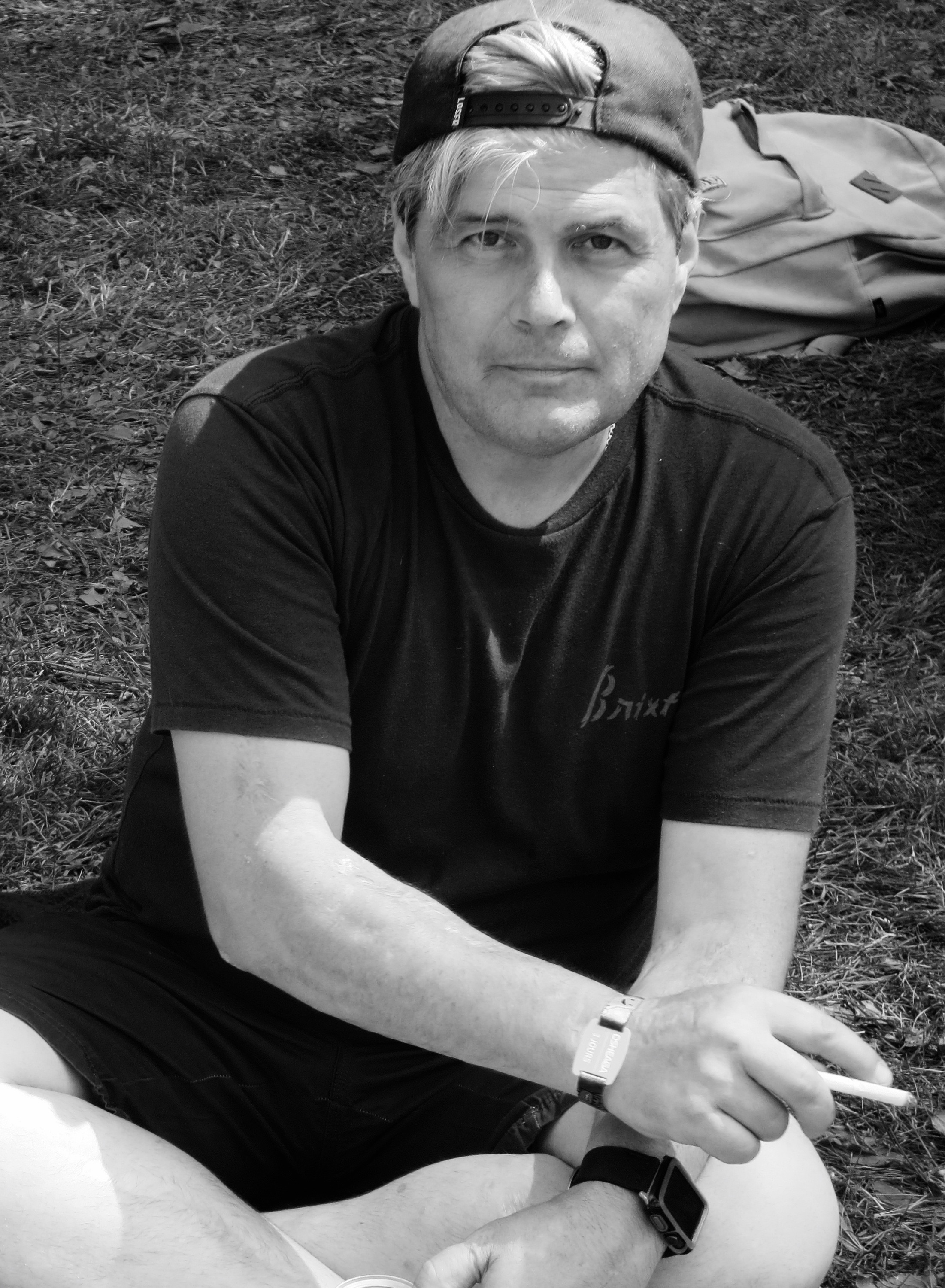
- L'Ecuyer in 2016
- Born: November 15, 1964 (age 61); Montreal, Quebec, Canada
- Education: Ryerson Polytechnical Institute (now Toronto Metropolitan University)

John L'Ecuyer (born November 15, 1964) is a Canadian film and television director.

== Biography ==
Born in Montreal, L'Ecuyer later moved and studied at Ryerson Polytechnical Institute in Toronto, where his classmates included screenwriter Brad Abraham. His brother Gerald L'Ecuyer is also a film and television director.

L'Ecuyer's first feature, Curtis's Charm (1995), based on a short story by Jim Carroll, starred Maurice Dean Wint as Curtis, a paranoid drug addict who believes his mother-in-law has cast a voodoo spell on him, which has resulted in his being stalked by a killer squirrel. It was shot on black and white 16 mm film.

The film, executive produced by Atom Egoyan and Patricia Rozema, premiered at the 1995 Toronto International Film Festival, where it received a special jury citation as Best Canadian Feature Film.

Also at TIFF that year, L'Ecuyer's short film Use Once and Destroy (1995) received another special jury citation at the festival, for Best Canadian Short Film. The short film was based on his own book, titled UseOnceAndDestroy, which was published in 1998 by Gutter Press.

L'Ecuyer's other feature film credits include Saint Jude and On the Verge of a Fever, both of which premiered at TIFF. His feature documentary, Confessions of a Rabid Dog, won Best Social Documentary at HotDocs.

In 1999, Playback called him "one of the country’s top dramatic directors."

Since the 2000s, L'Ecuyer has worked primarily in television. His television work includes dozens of popular series such as ReGenesis and Murdoch Mysteries, and he has also directed over a dozen made-for-television films.

== Filmography ==
=== Film ===
Short film

Year	Title	Director	Writer
1994	It's a Beautiful Day	Yes	Yes
1994	Low Life	Yes	Yes
1995	Use Once and Destroy	Yes	Yes

Feature film

Year	Title	Director	Writer
1995	Curtis's Charm	Yes	Yes
1997	Confessions of a Rabid Dog	Yes	Yes
2000	Saint Jude	Yes	No
2004	On the Verge of a Fever	Yes	No
2014	A Date with Miss Fortune	Yes	No

=== Television ===
Year	Title	Notes
1996	The Rez	
1996–1997	Ready or Not	"Prince Charming" "Second Generation" "Saint Carla"
1997	The Hunger	
1998	Da Vinci's Inquest	"Known to the Ministry" "The Stranger Inside"
1998–1999	Traders	"Meltdown" "End Games" "Reap the Whirlwind" "Killer Instinct" "This World ... Then the Fireworks"
1999	Cold Squad	"Deadly Games: Part I"
1999–2000	The City	"Shadows" "Obsessions" "Swing Your Partner" "Sweet Cherub: Part I" "Blindside!"
2000	Live Through This	
2000	Queer as Folk	
2001	Blue Murder	"Steel Drums" "Remington Park"
2001–2002	Nero Wolfe	"Eeny Meeny Murder Moe" "Disguise for Murder" "Too Many Clients" "Before I Die" "Help Wanted, Male"
2002	Tom Stone	
2002–2003	Just Cause	"Tonia with a O" "Trial by Memory"
2006	11 Cameras	
2004–2007	ReGenesis	"Baby Bomb" "The Oldest Virus" "Blackout" "The Secret War" "Resurrection" "The Longest Night" "Haze" "China" "The Cocktail" "Our Men in Havana" "Adrift"
2008	The Guard	"Fistful of Rain" "Body Parts"
2008–2011	Murdoch Mysteries	"Bad Medicine" "The Prince and the Rebel" "The Curse of Beaton Manor" "Monsieur Murdoch" "Confederate Treasure"
2012	The Listener	"Captain Nightfall"
2015	Blood and Water	
2014	The Other world	
2016	Gangland Undercover	
2016	Real Detective	
2017–2019	The Detectives	

TV movies

- Tagged: The Jonathan Wamback Story (2001)
- Choice: The Henry Morgentaler Story (2003)
- Prom Queen: The Marc Hall Story (2004)
- Under the Dragon's Tail (2005)
- In God's Country (2007)
- The Good Times are Killing Me (2008)
- The Riverbank (2012)
- Sorority Surrogate (2013)
- My Daughter's Nightmare (2013)
- Early Release (2016)
- Gwen Shamblin: Starving for Salvation (2023)
