= Zigrail =

- Directed by: André Turpin
- Written by: André Turpin; Sophie Leblond; Sylvain Bellemare
- Produced by: Andrew Noble
- Starring: André Charlebois; Ariane Cordeau; Dorothée Berryman
- Cinematography: André Turpin
- Edited by: Sophie Leblond
- Music by: John Zorn
- Production company: Productions Jeux d'Ombres
- Distributed by: Alliance Films
- Release date: June 17, 1995 (FIFM)
- Running time: 78 minutes
- Country: Canada
- Language: French

Zigrail is a Canadian drama film, directed by André Turpin and released in 1995. The film stars André Charlebois as André, a man who runs a bungee jumping business; after his girlfriend Kim (Ariane Cordeau), who has been away on a work contract in Istanbul for several months, calls to tell him that she's pregnant and has decided to have an abortion, he abandons his life and embarks on a road trip from Paris to Istanbul to convince her to change her mind.

The cast also includes Dorothée Berryman, Sonia Vigneault, Armand Turpin, Marie Luca, Paola Menozzi, Sebastien Joannette, Stéphane Crête, Daniel Laberge, Marie-Hélène Tessier, Julie Poulin and Frank Fontaine in supporting roles. Several of Turpin's film industry colleagues, including Luc Déry, Kim McCraw, Arto Paragamian, Patrice Sauvé and Denis Villeneuve, also appeared in small bit parts.

The film was the directorial debut of Turpin, who had previously been known principally as a cinematographer.

== Distribution ==
It premiered in June 1995 at the Festival International de Films de Montréal, and was subsequently screened in the Perspective Canada program at the 1995 Toronto International Film Festival. It had been planned as the opening film of the 1995 Rendez-vous du cinéma québécois a few months earlier, but was not complete at that time due to technical difficulties with the sound recording.

== Critical response ==
John Griffin of the Montreal Gazette wrote that the film was strong and technically innovative in its first half, but lost direction once André set off on his road trip.
