= Odilon Redon, or The Eye Like a Strange Balloon Mounts Toward Infinity =

- Directed by: Guy Maddin
- Written by: Guy Maddin
- Produced by: Diane Freeman; Keith Griffiths
- Starring: Jim Keller; Caelum Vatnsdal; Brandy Bayes
- Cinematography: Terry Reimer
- Production company: Guy Maddin Productions
- Release date: 1995
- Running time: 4 minutes
- Country: Canada
- Language: English

Odilon Redon, or The Eye Like a Strange Balloon Mounts Toward Infinity is a Canadian short drama film, directed by Guy Maddin and released in 1995. The film stars Jim Keller and Caelum Vatnsdal as Keller and Caelum, a father and son who compete for the affections of Berenice (Brandy Bayes), a woman they have rescued from a train crash.

The film was commissioned by the BBC as part of a series in which filmmakers were asked to create short films inspired by other artists. Maddin chose French painter Odilon Redon, focusing in particular on The Eye Like a Strange Balloon, one of the charcoal illustrations Redon did for the first published French translation of the works of Edgar Allan Poe.

The film had its theatrical premiere at the 1995 Toronto International Film Festival, where it received an honorable mention from the Best Canadian Short Film award jury.
