= Aubert Pallascio =

Canadian actor (1937–2020)

- Born: Aubert Pallascio-Morin; August 19, 1937; Montreal, Quebec, Canada
- Died: July 5, 2020 (aged 82); Montreal, Quebec, Canada
- Other name: Louis Aubert
- Education: Conservatoire national supérieur d'art dramatique
- Occupations: Actor, voice actor
- Years active: 1961–2016

Aubert Pallascio-Morin (August 19, 1937 – July 5, 2020), sometimes credited as Louis Aubert, was a Canadian actor and voice actor. He was nominated in for a Genie Award for Best Actor for his performance in Black List (1996).

== Early life and education ==
Pallascio was born in Montreal in 1937, the son of journalist Ernest Pallascio-Morin OC. He trained at the Conservatoire national supérieur d'art dramatique in France, and interned at the Comédie-Française and Théâtre National Populaire.

Upon returning to Quebec, he initially used the stage name 'Louis Aubert', but later reverted to using his real name in 1974.

== Career ==
Pallascio has performed on the stages of the Théâtre du Nouveau Monde, Théâtre du Rideau Vert, Théâtre Denise-Pelletier, Trident and Théâtre Jean-Duceppe among others. His notable television credits include roles in Terre humaine, Le parc des Braves, L'Héritage and Omertà. Pallascio portrayed the Canadian Prime Minister in the 1980 film The Kidnapping of the President. He was nominated in 1996 for a Genie Award for Best Performance by an Actor in a Supporting Role for his role in Black List (Liste noire).

As a dubber, Pallascio was notably the regular Canadian French-language voice of Morgan Freeman, from 2002 to 2014.

== Death ==
He died on July 5, 2020, at the age of 82 in Montreal from cancer.

== Filmography ==
Year	Title	Role	Notes
1971	Les chats bottés		
1972	And Hope to Die	Renner	
1973	U-Turn	Young ferry driver	
1973	Souris, tu m'inquiètes		
1974	Les aventures d'une jeune veuve		
1976	Strange Shadows in an Empty Room	Swedish Driver	Uncredited
1979	Éclair au chocolat	Norbert	
1979	Jigsaw	Parker	
1980	Avoir 16 ans	Le père de Louis	
1980	The Kidnapping of the President	Prime Minister	
1980	The Lucky Star	Kees	
1980	Suzanne	Detetective	
1980	The Coffin Affair	Sergent René Bourdon	
1982	La quarantaine	Peau dure	
1983	Lucien Brouillard		
1989	Mindfield	Captain Borko	
1991	Nelligan	Dr. Brennan	
1992	L'automne sauvage	Albert Tremblay	
1994	A Hero's Life	Hanibald âgé	Voice
1995	Liste noire	Harvey Dansereau	
1996	Lilies - Les feluettes	Older Simon	
2001	Druids		
2005	3 Needles	Herold	
2008	Punisher: War Zone	Tiberiu Bulat	
2009	Romaine par moins 30	Blabla	
2009	La donation	Gilles Roberge	
2011	Voyez comme ils dansent	Antoine Clément	
2012	Le torrent	Vieil instituteur	
