= 1996 Toronto International Film Festival =

Annual Canadian film festival

- Festival poster
- Opening film: Fly Away Home
- Closing film: That Thing You Do!
- Location: Toronto, Ontario, Canada
- Hosted by: Toronto International Film Festival Group
- Festival date: September 5, 1996–September 14, 1996
- Language: English
- Website: tiff.net
- 1997 1995

The 21st Toronto International Film Festival (TIFF) took place in Toronto, Ontario, Canada between September 5 and September 14, 1996. The festival opened with the film Fly Away Home, and closed with That Thing You Do!.

This year's festival marked significant changes in the programming streams, including The Edge, Asian Horizons and Latin American Panorama being merged into Contemporary World Cinema, and First Cinema being discontinued with first films instead appearing under Contemporary World Cinema, Real to Reel and Discovery. The Dialogues series, which had been introduced the previous year as a special event, was turned into a permanent program.

== Awards ==
| Award | Film | Director | Ref |
|---|---|---|---|
| People's Choice Award | Shine | Scott Hicks | |
| Metro Media Award | Shine | Scott Hicks | |
| Best Canadian Feature Film | Long Day's Journey into Night | David Wellington | |
| Best Canadian Feature Film - Special Jury Citation | Kissed | Lynne Stopkewich | |
| Best Canadian Short Film | Letters from Home | Mike Hoolboom | |
| Best Canadian Short Film - Special Jury Citation | Sin Cycle | Jack Cocker & Ben Famiglietti | |
| Best Canadian Short Film - Special Jury Citation | Lodela | Philippe Baylaucq | |
| FIPRESCI International Critics' Award | Life | Lawrence Johnston | |
| FIPRESCI International Critics' Award - Special Mention | The Daytrippers | Greg Mottola | |

== Programme ==
=== Galas ===
| English title | Original title | Director(s) | Production country |
|---|---|---|---|
| 2 Days in the Valley | | John Herzfeld | United States |
| American Buffalo | | Michael Corrente | United States, United Kingdom |
| Bogus | | Norman Jewison | United States |
| Extreme Measures | | Michael Apted | United Kingdom, United States |
| Fly Away Home | | Carroll Ballard | United States |
| Infinity | | Matthew Broderick | United States |
| Jerusalem | | Bille August | Sweden, Denmark, Norway |
| Jude | | Michael Winterbottom | United Kingdom |
| Kama Sutra: A Tale of Love | | Mira Nair | India, United Kingdom, Germany, Japan |
| Long Day's Journey into Night | | David Wellington | Canada |
| Michael Collins | | Neil Jordan | Ireland, United Kingdom, United States |
| Mother | | Albert Brooks | United States |
| Ridicule | | Patrice Leconte | France |
| Shadow Play | Portraits chinois | Martine Dugowson | France |
| Shine | | Scott Hicks | Australia |
| Swann | | Anna Benson Gyles | Canada |
| That Thing You Do! | | Tom Hanks | United States |
| The Van | | Stephen Frears | Ireland, United Kingdom, United States |

=== Special Presentations ===
| English title | Original title | Director(s) | Production country |
|---|---|---|---|
| Albino Alligator | | Kevin Spacey | United States |
| Bastard Out of Carolina | | Anjelica Huston | United States |
| Beyond the Clouds | Al di là delle nuvole | Michelangelo Antonioni | Italy, France, Germany |
| Big Night | | Campbell Scott, Stanley Tucci | United States |
| Breaking the Waves | | Lars von Trier | Denmark, Sweden, France, Netherlands |
| Deep Crimson | Profundo Carmesí | Arturo Ripstein | Mexico |
| Drifting Clouds | Kauas pilvet karkaavat | Aki Kaurismäki | Finland |
| For Ever Mozart | | Jean-Luc Godard | France, Switzerland |
| The Funeral | | Abel Ferrara | United States |
| Goodbye South, Goodbye | | Hou Hsiao-hsien | Taiwan |
| Gray's Anatomy | | Steven Soderbergh | United Kingdom, United States |
| If These Walls Could Talk | | Cher, Nancy Savoca | United States |
| Inside | | Arthur Penn | United States |
| The Leading Man | | John Duigan | United Kingdom |
| Looking for Richard | | Al Pacino | United States |
| Losing Chase | | Kevin Bacon | United States |
| Lust and Revenge | | Paul Cox | Australia |
| Microcosmos | Microcosmos: Le peuple de l'herbe | Marie Pérennou, Claude Nuridsany | France, Switzerland, Italy, United Kingdom |
| The Ogre | Der Unhold | Volker Schlöndorff | France, Germany, United Kingdom |
| The Pillow Book | | Peter Greenaway | Netherlands, United Kingdom, France, Luxembourg |
| Schizopolis | | Steven Soderbergh | United States |
| The Secret Agent | | Christopher Hampton | United Kingdom |
| The Substance of Fire | | Daniel J. Sullivan | United States |
| A Summer's Tale | Conte d'été | Eric Rohmer | France |
| Taxi | | Carlos Saura | Spain |
| Tieta of Agreste | Tieta do Agreste | Carlos Diegues | Brazil |
| Twelfth Night | | Trevor Nunn | United Kingdom, United States, Ireland |
| Unhook the Stars | | Nick Cassavetes | United States |
| The War at Home | | Emilio Estevez | United States |

=== Contemporary World Cinema ===
| English title | Original title | Director(s) | Production country |
|---|---|---|---|
| The Come-On | El Anzuelo | Ernesto Rimoch | Mexico |
| Corisco and Dada | | Rosemberg Cariry | Brazil |
| How Angels Are Born | Como Nascem os Anjos | Murilo Salles | Brazil |
| Melodrama | | Rolando Díaz | Cuba |
| My Last Man | Mi último hombre | Tatiana Gaviola | Chile |
| Oedipus Mayor | | Jorge Alí Triana | Colombia |

=== Discovery ===
| English title | Original title | Director(s) | Production country |
|---|---|---|---|
| The Daytrippers | | Greg Mottola | United States |
| Driven | | Michael Shoob | United States |
| Landscapes of Memory | O Sertão das Memórias | José Araújo | Brazil |
| The Riddle | | Evan Brenner | Russia, United States |
| The Salt in the Wound | El Dedo en la Llaga | Alberto Lecchi | Argentina |
| Sotto Voce | | Mario Levin | Argentina |
| A Starry Sky | Um Céu de Estrelas | Tata Amaral | Brazil |

=== Perspective Canada: Features ===
| English title | Original title | Director(s) | Production country |
|---|---|---|---|
| Cat Swallows Parakeet and Speaks! | | Ileana Pietrobruno | Canada |
| The Cockroach that Ate Cincinnati | | Michael McNamara | Canada |
| The Escort | L'Escorte | Denis Langlois | Canada |
| Fire | | Deepa Mehta | Canada |
| The Human Plant | La Plante humaine | Pierre Hébert | Canada |
| Hustler White | | Bruce LaBruce | Canada |
| Kissed | | Lynne Stopkewich | Canada |
| Lilies | | John Greyson | Canada |
| Lulu | | Srinivas Krishna | Canada |
| Not Me! | Sous-sol | Pierre Gang | Canada |
| Power | | Magnus Isacsson | Canada |
| Project Grizzly | | Peter Lynch | Canada |
| Shoemaker | | Colleen Murphy | Canada |

=== Perspective Canada: Shorts ===
| English title | Original title | Director(s) | Production country |
|---|---|---|---|
| Can I Get a Witness? | | Kris Lefcoe | Canada |
| Letters from Home | | Mike Hoolboom | Canada |
| Lodela | | Philippe Baylaucq | Canada |
| Moscow Summer | | Robin Schlaht | Canada |
| Sin Cycle | | Jack Cocker, Ben Famiglietti | Canada |
| Soft Like Me | | Jeffrey Erbach | Canada |
| Trouble | | Paul diStefano | Canada |

=== Planet Africa ===
| English title | Original title | Director(s) | Production country |
|---|---|---|---|
| Aristotle's Plot | Le Complot d'Aristotle | Jean-Pierre Bekolo | Zimbabwe, France |
| Everyone's Child | | Tsitsi Dangarembga | Zimbabwe |
| John Henrik Clarke: A Great and Mighty Walk | | St. Clair Bourne | United States |
| Macadam Tribe | Macadam Tribu | Zeka Laplaine | France, Zaire, Mali |
| A Summer in La Goulette | Un été à La Goulette | Férid Boughedir | Tunisia |
| The Watermelon Woman | | Cheryl Dunye | United States |
| W.E.B. Du Bois: A Biography in Four Voices | | Louis Massiah | United States |
| When the Stars Meet the Sea | Quand les Étoiles rencontrent la mer | Raymond Rajaonarivelo | Madagascar |

=== Midnight Madness ===
| English title | Original title | Director(s) | Production country |
|---|---|---|---|
| All of Them Witches | Sobrenatural | Daniel Gruener | Mexico |
| Attack of Legion | Gamera Tsū: Region Shūrai | Shusuke Kaneko | Japan |
| Curdled | | Reb Braddock | United States |
| Killer Tongue | La lengua asesina | Alberto Sciamma | Spain |
| Organ | Orugan | Kei Fujiwara | Japan |
| Ratchet | | John Johnson | United States |
| Road Movie | | Peter Care | United States |
| Screwed | | Alexander Crawford | United States |
| The Stendhal Syndrome | La Sindrome di Stendhal | Dario Argento | Italy |

=== Vietnam Perspective ===
A special program highlighting films from Vietnam.

| English title | Original title | Director(s) | Production country |
|---|---|---|---|
| Black Cactus | Xuong rong den | Lê Dân | Vietnam |
| Gone, Gone Forever Gone | Bụi Hồng | Hồ Quang Minh | Vietnam |
| Nostalgia for the Countryside | Thương nhớ đồng quê | Đặng Nhật Minh | Vietnam |
| The Retired General | Tướng về hưu | Nguyễn Khắc Lợi | Vietnam |
| When the Tenth Month Comes | Bao giờ cho đến tháng Mười | Đặng Nhật Minh | Vietnam |

=== Dialogues ===
| English title | Original title | Director(s) | Selected by |
|---|---|---|---|
| The Battle of Algiers | La battaglia di Algeri | Gillo Pontecorvo | Mira Nair |
| Blinkity Blank | | Norman McLaren | Jean-Luc Godard |
| Cries and Whispers | Viskningar och rop | Ingmar Bergman | Bille August |
| The Criminal Life of Archibaldo de la Cruz | Ensayo de un crimen | Luis Buñuel | Atom Egoyan |
| Jules and Jim | Jules et Jim | François Truffaut | Arthur Penn |
| Last Year at Marienbad | L'Année dernière à Marienbad | Alain Resnais | Peter Greenaway |
| Sweet Sweetback's Baadasssss Song | | Melvin Van Peebles | Claire Denis |
| Talking to Strangers | | Rob Tregenza | Jean-Luc Godard |
| A Woman Under the Influence | | John Cassavetes | Gena Rowlands |

=== Unverified program ===
- The Arena of Murder by Amos Gitai
- Beautiful Thing by Hettie MacDonald
- La bouche de Jean-Pierre by Lucile Hadžihalilović
- Bound by Lilly Wachowski & Lana Wachowski
- Box of Moonlight by Tom DiCillo
- Color of a Brisk and Leaping Day by Christopher Münch
- Floating Life by Clara Law
- Forgotten Silver by Peter Jackson & Costa Botes
- Gabbeh by Mohsen Makhmalbaf
- Grace of My Heart by Allison Anders
- Kolya by Jan Svěrák
- Life by Lawrence Johnston
- Little Angel by Helke Misselwitz
- Ponette by Jacques Doillon
- Prisoner of the Mountains by Sergei Bodrov
- The Quiet Room by Rolf de Heer
- Ripe by Mo Ogrodnik
- Some Mother's Son by Terry George
- The Square Circle (Daayraa)) by Amol Palekar
- Swingers by Doug Liman
- A Tickle in the Heart by Stefan Schwietert
- To Speak the Unspeakable: The Message of Elie Wiesel (Mondani a mondhatatlant: Elie Wiesel üzenete) by Judit Elek
- Trees Lounge by Steve Buscemi
- Trinity and Beyond by Peter Kuran
- Vesna Goes Fast (Vesna va veloce) by Carlo Mazzacurati
- Waiting for Guffman by Christopher Guest
- The Whole Wide World by Dan Ireland
