= Enigmatico =

1995 Canadian documentary film

- Directed by: David Mortin; Patricia Fogliato
- Produced by: David Mortin; Patricia Fogliato
- Cinematography: Rudolf Blahacek
- Edited by: David Mortin; Patricia Fogliato
- Music by: Ernie Tollar
- Production company: Enigmatico Films
- Distributed by: National Film Board of Canada
- Release date: 1995
- Running time: 51 minutes
- Country: Canada
- Language: English

Enigmatico is a Canadian short documentary film, directed by and released in 1995. The film explores Italian-Canadian culture through the experiences of various Italian-Canadian artistic and cultural figures, including Louis Quilico, Nino Ricci, Marco Micone, Filippo Salvatore, Antonio D'Alfonso, Mary di Michele, Carmelo Arnoldin, Vince Mancuso, Gianna Patriarca, Vincenzo Pietropaolo, Maristella Roca and Quartetto Gelato.

The film premiered in February 1995 at Cinema in Citta, a special mini-festival of Italian Canadian films at the National Film Board of Canada's John Spotton Theatre, and later received its television premiere on TVOntario in June 1995. Other films in the Cinema in Citta program included Caffè Italia, Montréal, Brown Bread Sandwiches, Blast 'Em and The Saracen Woman (La Sarrasine).

The film was a Genie Award nominee for Best Short Documentary at the 16th Genie Awards in 1993.
