= The Champagne Safari =

- Directed by: George Ungar
- Written by: Harold Crooks; John Kramer; Steve Lucas
- Produced by: George Ungar; John Walker
- Cinematography: Joan Hutton; Douglas Kiefer; Mathieu Roberts; Kirk Tougas; John Walker; Floyd Crosby
- Edited by: John Kramer
- Music by: Normand Roger
- Production company: National Film Board
- Release date: 1995 (TIFF)
- Running time: 100 minutes
- Country: Canada
- Language: English

The Champagne Safari is a 1995 Canadian documentary film directed by George Ungar. A portrait of industrialist Charles Bedaux, it focuses primarily on his controversial Bedaux expedition through northern Alberta and British Columbia in 1934, including Floyd Crosby's original footage of the expedition that had long been believed lost until being found in Paris in the 1980s.

The film was narrated by Colm Feore and Jim Morris, and included David Hemblen as the voice of Bedaux.

The film was in development by 1988, originally under the working title Dangerous Alliances: The Bedaux Story. It premiered in the Perspective Canada program at the 1995 Toronto International Film Festival, and was broadcast on TVOntario's documentary series The View from Here in December 1995.

The film won the Genie Award for Best Feature Length Documentary at the 16th Genie Awards.
