= Sheldon Currie =

Canadian author and critic

Sheldon John Currie CM (born 1934) is a Canadian author, critic and professor emeritus at St. Francis Xavier University. His books include The Glace Bay Miners' Museum, The Company Store and Down the Coaltown Road. A movie, Margaret's Museum, was based on The Glace Bay Miners' Museum. Currie was born in Reserve Mines, Cape Breton as one of five children.
