= Simon Baker (Canadian actor) =

Canadian actor

Simon R. Baker
- Born: March 30, 1986 (age 40); North Vancouver-Capilano, British Columbia, Canada
- Occupation: Actor
- Years active: 1994–present

Simon Richard Baker III (born March 30, 1986) is an Aboriginal Canadian actor of Cree, Haida, and Squamish descent. He has appeared in Strange Empire (2014), Murdoch Mysteries (2017), Outlander (2022), and Hey, Viktor! (2023).

== Early life ==
Baker hails from North Vancouver-Capilano, British Columbia, and is of Cree, Haida, and Squamish descent. He is a graduate of the Canadian Film Centre Actors Conservatory.

== Career ==
Baker began his filming career at the age nine in the movie Once in a Blue Moon. He played Charlie Muskrat in North of 60.

In 2023, he worked with FortisBC to present a series of documentaries called The New Energy on First Nation peoples on how indigenous communities have engaged in economic, energy and cultural resourcefulness, to move forward while still preserving their culture and traditions.

== Filmography ==
- Once in a Blue Moon (1995)
- Back to Turtle Island (1995)
- The Sweet Hereafter (1997) – Bear Otto
- Smoke Signals (1998) – Young Thomas Builds the Fire
- Big Bear (1998) – Horsechild
- Shanghai Noon (2000) – Little Feather
- Canada: A People's History (2000) – Vision Quest Boy
- Before We Ruled the Earth (2001) – Moak ("Buffalo Tracks")
- Spooky House (2002) – Prescott
- Now & Forever (2002) – Young John Myron
- Dream Storm (2001) – Charlie Muskrat (TV)
- Tribe of Joseph (2002) – Taan
- Another Country (2002) – Charlie Muskrat (TV)
- Dreamkeeper (2003) – Second Brother (TV)
- On the Corner (2003) – Randy Henry
- The Missing (2003) – Honesco
- Distant Drumming (2004) – Charlie Muskrat
- I, Robot (2004) – Farber Posse
- Buffalo Dreams (2005) – Thomas Blackhorse
- Into the West (2005) – Young loved by the Buffalo
- Buckaroo: The Movie (2005) – Jerome
- Crying 4 U (2007) – Joey
- The Stone Child (2008) – Roger
- Journey to the Center of the Earth (2008) – Wakinta Rescuer
- Strange Empire (2014) – Wematin
- Murdoch Mysteries (2017) – Akaanáa
- Outlander (2022) – Still Water
- The Faraway Place Short (2022) – Urus
- The New Energy (2023) – Himself
- Hey, Viktor! (2023) – Simon
- The Birds Who Fear Death (2024) – Ryan
