= Geneviève Brouillette =

Canadian actress

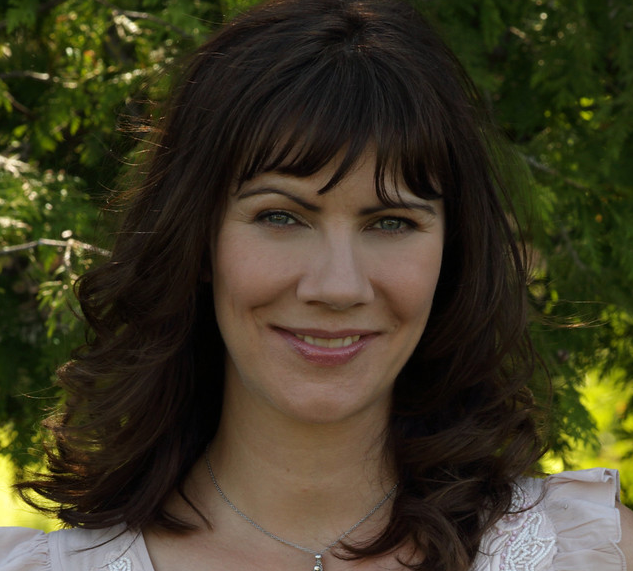
Brouillette in 2014

Geneviève Brouillette (born August 23, 1969 in Saint-Hyacinthe, Quebec) is a French Canadian television and film actress from Saint-Hyacinthe, Quebec.

Since 1998 she has gradually appeared in film and she appeared in A Sunday in Kigali in 2006.

On the small screen, Geneviève Brouillette has portrayed several characters, including the model Clara in the TV series Diva and Geneviève in Un gars, une fille, a free-spirited character whom Sylvie loved to hate.

In cinema, her career was marked by the role of the prostitute Gabrielle Angers in the Quebec thriller Liste noire (Black List), directed by Jean-Marc Vallée. She also played Florence in Nuit de noces, a comedy by Émile Gaudreault and a box-office hit in the summer of 2000, in which she played a newlywed opposite François Morency. In 2003, she appeared alongside Philippe Noiret in the film Père et Fils by Michel Boujenah, in André Forcier's Les États-Unis d'Albert, and as Madame la Consule in the poignant film Un dimanche à Kigali. Geneviève Brouillette also received the Prix Gémeaux for Best Supporting Actress (Television Series, Comedy) in 2003 for her performance in Rumeurs and was nominated for the same role in 2005.

== Filmography ==
- 1983: Entre chien et loup
- 1991: Montreal Stories
- 1993: Blanche: Marie-Ange
- 1995: 4 et demi...: Daphné Saint-Amour
- 1995: Black List (Liste noire): Gabrielle Angers
- 1996: Jasmine: Antonia Valiquette
- 1996: Urgences: Beatrice
- 1997: Un gars, une fille: Geneviève
- 1997: Diva: Clara Baly
- 1998: You Can Thank Me Later: Nurse
- 1998: The Countess of Baton Rouge (La Comtesse de Bâton Rouge): Paula Paul de Nerval
- 2000: Le Monde de Charlotte: Marcia
- 2001: Wedding Night (Nuit de noces): Florence
- 2002: Rumeurs: Hélène Charbonneau
- 2003: Père et fils: Hélène
- 2005: The United States of Albert (Les États-Unis d'Albert)
- 2005: Miss Météo
- 2006: A Sunday in Kigali (Un dimanche à Kigali): Consul
- 2011: Funkytown
- 2012: L'Affaire Dumont
- 2020: The Sticky Side of Baklava (La Face cachée du baklava)
