= René Homier-Roy =

Canadian journalist and television presenter (1940–2025)

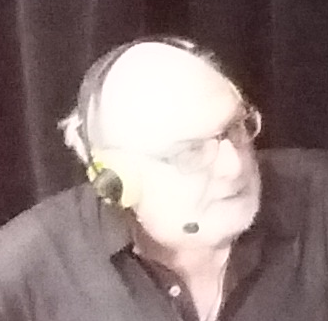
- Homier-Roy in 2015
- Born: 5 April 1940; Montreal, Quebec, Canada
- Died: 14 September 2025 (aged 85)
- Education: McGill University; University of Ottawa; Université de Montréal
- Occupations: Journalist, television presenter

René Homier-Roy (5 April 1940 – 14 September 2025) was a Canadian journalist and television presenter.

== Life and career ==
Born in Montreal on 5 April 1940, Homier-Roy was born to parents Émilien Roy and Rolande Homier. He studied architecture at McGill University and political science at the University of Ottawa and the Université de Montréal. From 1969 to 1973, he worked for La Presse before founding the magazine Nous in 1973. He then worked as a freelancer, contributing to Châtelaine, TV Hebdo, and L'actualité. From 1989 to 1993, he presented La Bande des six alongside Marie-France Bazzo, Dany Laferrière, Nathalie Petrowski, and Georges-Hébert Germain. In 1995, he became a film critic for TQS.

In July 2012, Homier-Roy came out as a gay man following the death of his partner, Pierre Morin. In April 2013, he announced that he would be retiring from television at the end of the season of Radio-Canada's C'est bien meilleur le matin.

Homier-Roy died on 14 September 2025, at the age of 85.
