= Magic in the Water =

1995 film by Rick Stevenson

- Theatrical release poster
- Directed by: Rick Stevenson
- Screenplay by: Rick Stevenson; Icel Dobell Massey
- Story by: Ninian Dunnett; Rick Stevenson; Icel Dobell Massey
- Produced by: William Stevenson; Matthew O'Connor
- Starring: Mark Harmon; Joshua Jackson; Harley Jane Kozak; Sarah Wayne
- Cinematography: Thomas Burstyn
- Edited by: Allan Lee
- Music by: David Schwartz
- Production company: Triumph Films
- Distributed by: TriStar Pictures
- Release date: August 30, 1995
- Running time: 101 minutes
- Countries: United States; Canada
- Languages: English; Dutch
- Box office: $2.6 million

Magic in the Water is a 1995 family adventure fantasy film directed by Rick Stevenson and written by Icel Dobell Massey and Stevenson from a story by Stevenson, Dobell Massey and Ninian Dunnett. It stars Mark Harmon, Joshua Jackson, Harley Jane Kozak and Sarah Wayne. The film follows two siblings and their preoccupied father who takes them on a vacation to a remote Canadian lake in British Columbia, where the siblings discover the lake is said to be inhabited by a mysterious lake monster.

The film was distributed by TriStar Pictures and produced by Triumph Films. It was released to generally negative reviews.

== Plot ==
Ashley Black is depressed because her father Jack spends all his time focusing on his job instead of her and her older brother Joshua. She constantly records his radio show and listens to it. One day, her father takes them to a small town of Glenorky, with a lake that is popular with tourists due to a local legend about a mythical aquatic monster named Orky. They rent a cabin next to an elderly First Nations man who uses a wheelchair. Jack meets a local psychiatrist, Dr. Wanda Bell, who is trying to aid a support group of men who claim that they have been possessed by Orky's spirit. When Ashley runs away, Jack also has the same experience while looking for her. When Ashley climbs on a rickety ladder of a tree house to sleep for the night, but the ladder's rungs start to break, causing Ashley to fall, but Jack (possessed by Orky) attempts to rescue her in time, only to be knocked out unconscious and ends up at the hospital the next day. As a result, Jack suddenly becomes more devoted to his children, but he becomes increasingly ill during the meantime.

Ashley and Joshua find out that the reason that Orky is possessing the townspeople is to try and tell them that he is dying because an evil businessman is dumping toxic waste into the lake. Ashley and Joshua help the old man in the cabin next to theirs find a totem pole in the woods. With the help of Hiro, the son of Japanese monster seekers, they sneak into a factory and try to expose the businessman's illegal dumping by sabotaging a mechanical "Orky" from being revealed as a hoax. Unfortunately, the mechanical Orky begins to sink to the bottom of the lake near the dump site, which the businessman's henchmen attempts to rig the dump site, so people won't find the evidence. However, an unseen creature spooks the polluters away, and Ashley, Joshua, and Hiro get their first glimpse of Orky. The businessman and his polluters are held accountable for their actions.

In an underground cave where Orky lives, Ashley, Joshua, and Hira reunite with Jack and discovers Orky in person. However, Orky, suddenly dies from the poisonous waste, leaving the family despondent. They are rescued from the hole in the cave, until the old man summons a lightning bolt which enters the hole and covers the sand on top of it. The next day, Jack encourages Ashley to believe in Orky again, so she and Hiro stay on the dock overnight and leave some cookies out. When she realizes that the cookies have been eaten, Ashley screams with joy, which suggests that Orky is still alive, or resurrected.

== Cast ==
- Mark Harmon as Jack Black
- Joshua Jackson as Joshua Black, Jack's son
- Harley Jane Kozak as Dr. Wanda Bell, Jack's love interest
- Sarah Wayne as Ashley Black, Jack's daughter
- Frank Sotonoma Salsedo as Uncle Kipper
- Willie Nark-Orn as Hiro, Ashley's best friend
- Ben Cardinal as Joe Pickled Tout
- Morris Panych as Mack Miller
- Adrien Dorval as Wright Hardy
- Mark Acheson as Lefty Hardy
- Anthony Towe as Taka
- John Procaccino as Frank
- Tom Cavanagh as Simon

== Reception ==
Magic in the Water received generally negative from critics. On Rotten Tomatoes, it has an approval rating of 21% based on 24 reviews.

Critic Leonard Maltin wrote in his book that "All the magic must be in the water; there's certainly none on the screen. Routine family film feels like recycled Spielberg." Roger Ebert criticized the film's special effects, describing the creature Orky as an "ashen Barney". He also notes that Orky barely appears in the film at all.

At the 16th Genie Awards, the film won for cinematography and sound.

== See also ==
- Loch Ness
- Mee-Shee: The Water Giant
- The Water Horse: Legend of the Deep
