= Maurice Dean Wint =

British and Canadian actor (born 1964)

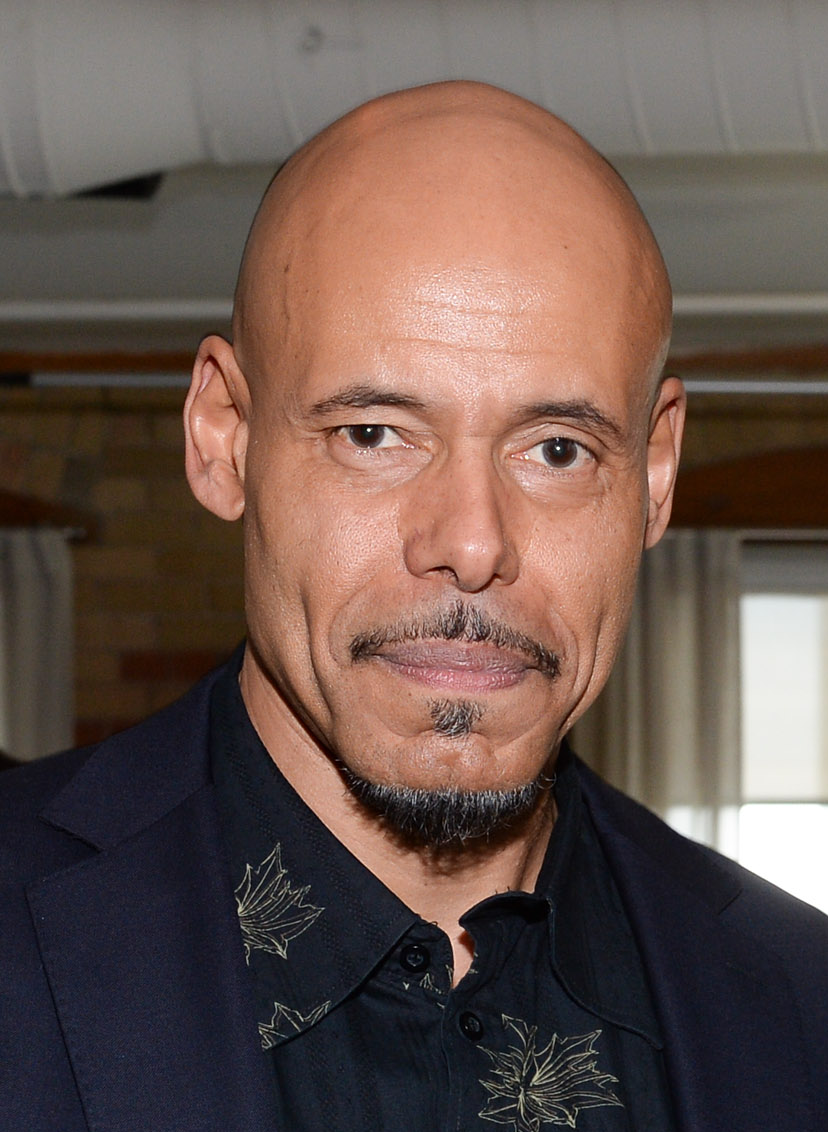
- Wint in 2017
- Born: 1 May 1964 (age 62); Leicestershire, England
- Citizenship: United Kingdom; Canada
- Education: York University
- Occupation: Actor
- Years active: 1987–present
- Spouse: Colette Stevenson

Maurice Dean Wint (born 1 May 1964) is a British-Canadian actor who has starred in both films and television series.

== Life and career ==
Wint was born in Leicestershire, England, and moved to Canada in 1967 with his family. He began his acting career performing in Toronto stage productions and graduated with a Bachelor of Fine Arts in Drama from York University.

Wint made his first appearance on television in the Canadian police crime series Night Heat in 1987.

In 1995, Wint starred in two critically acclaimed films that screened at the Toronto International Film Festival: Rude and Curtis's Charm. Rude received an honorable mention from the jury for the Best Canadian Film award at TIFF, and also screened at the 1995 Cannes Film Festival, while Curtis's Charm won a special jury citation for Best Canadian Feature Film.

One of his most famous roles came two years later as Quentin in the 1997 cult favorite science fiction horror film Cube.

His other notable work includes Sgt. Luther Robinson in the 2001 film Hedwig and the Angry Inch, and numerous roles in various Canadian television series such as Tekwar, RoboCop: Prime Directives, Psi Factor, Hudson & Rex, Shoot the Messenger, and Diggstown.

In 2022, Wint was a Canadian Screen Award nominee for Best Lead Performance in a Web Program or Series at the 10th Canadian Screen Awards for the web series For the Record.

In 2023, he starred in the popular television series SurrealEstate.

In addition to performing on the screen and stage, Wint also works regularly as a voice actor.

He was married to the actress Colette Stevenson.

== Accolades ==
For his television work, Wint earned two Gemini Award nominations, and for his theatre work, he has won a Dora Award in 2011 for his performance in Courageous at the Tarragon Theatre.

== Filmography ==
=== Film ===
Year	Title	Role
1991	The Reckoning	Curt
1992	The Swordsman	Swordplay Fencer
1993	Trial & Error	Mike Everett
1994	Spenser: Pale Kings and Princes	Esteva
1994	TekWar	Lt. Winger
1995	Rude	General
1995	Curtis's Charm	Curtis
1997	Cube	Quentin
1998	The Sweetest Gift	Booker
2000	The Best Girl	Father
2001	Hedwig and the Angry Inch	Sgt. Luther Robinson
2001	The Little Bear Movie	Cub's Father (voice)
2001	On Their Knees	Gimp Bartender
2001	Jane Doe	Niles Armstrong
2002	Evelyn: The Cutest Evil Dead Girl	Narrator
2003	Nothing	Narrator
2003	It All Happens Incredibly Fast	The Stranger
2005	Burnt Toast	Prosecution
2008	The Circuit	Davis
2010	Tangled	Paulo
2014	My Daughter Must Live	Wagner
2018	Her Stolen Past	Don
2018	Honey Bee	Det. Walker
2020	The Kid Detective	Constable Cleary
2021	Six Guns for Hire	The Gunslinger
2022	Brother	Samuel

=== Television ===
Selected television credits:

- Friday the 13th: The Series (1987–1990) as Gil (1 episode)
- Street Legal (1991) as Joe Minor (2 episodes)
- TekWar (1994–1996) as Lt Winger (9 episodes)
- PSI Factor: Chronicles of the Paranormal (1996–1999) as Dr. Curtis Rollins (12 episodes)
- Freaky Stories (1997) as Narrator - voice (1 episode)
- Earth: Final Conflict (1998) as Capt. Lucas Johnson (2 episodes)
- The Outer Limits (1998–1999) as Capt. Roger Kimbro / Jesha (2 episodes)
- Traders (1998–1999) as Fatty Size (4 episodes)
- Twice in a Lifetime (1999) as Dr. Sam Heistings, M.D. (1 episode)
- Power Stone (1999) as Pride Falcon / Gunrock - voice (8 episodes)
- Twitch City (2000) as Taylor (1 episode)
- RoboCop: Prime Directives (2001) as John T. Cable/RoboCable (4 episodes)
- The Zack Files (2001) as Lucky the Talisman - voice (1 episode)
- Blue Murder (2001–2002) as Cpl. Nathaniel Sweet/Sgt. Derek Tait (14 episodes)
- Tom Stone (2003) as Maj. Lakewood (1 episode)
- Moville Mysteries (2003) as Blind Louie - voice (1 episode)
- King (2003-2004) as Hugh the Yu-Yu - voice (3 episodes)
- Delilah & Julius (2005) as Dynimo / Agent Robinson - voice (2 episodes)
- ReGenesis (2004–2006) as Connor McGuinn (4 episodes)
- Sons of Butcher (2006) as Father Fish - voice (1 episode)
- Bruno and the Banana Bunch (2006) as Narrator - voice
- The Border (2009) as Leonard Drake (1 episode)
- Murdoch Mysteries (2009) as John Warton (1 episode)
- Bloodletting & Miraculous Cures (2010) as Anatomy Lab Professor (1 episode)
- Spliced (2010) as Narrator / Dreamworm - voice (2 episode)
- Haven (2010–2012; 2015) as Agent Byron Howard (8 episodes)
- Razzberry Jazzberry Jam (2008–2011) as RC the Double Bass - voice (7 episodes)
- The Listener (2011) as Officer Dewhurst (1 episode)
- Heartland (2011) as Martin (1 episode)
- Flashpoint (2012) as Detective Rene Meyer (1 episode)
- Transporter: The Series (2014) as Wilson (1 episode)
- Shoot the Messenger (2016) as Phil Hardcastle (8 episodes)
- Suits (2017) as Rick Dunn (1 episode)
- Murdoch Mysteries (2017) as Raymond Hatch (1 episode)
- Trailer Park Boys: The Animated Series (2019) as Teddy - voice (1 episode)
- Diggstown (2019-2022) as Austin Diggs (14 episodes)
- SurrealEstate (2021–2025) as August Ripley (main role)
- The Last of Us (2025) as Seraphite Priest (1 episode)

=== Video games ===
Year	Title	Role	Notes
1998	Marvel vs. Capcom: Clash of Super Heroes	Onslaught	
2000	Spawn: In the Demon's Hand	Spawn, Brimstone	
2011	Warriors: Legends of Troy	Rhesos	
