= Sonia Vigneault =

French-Canadian actress

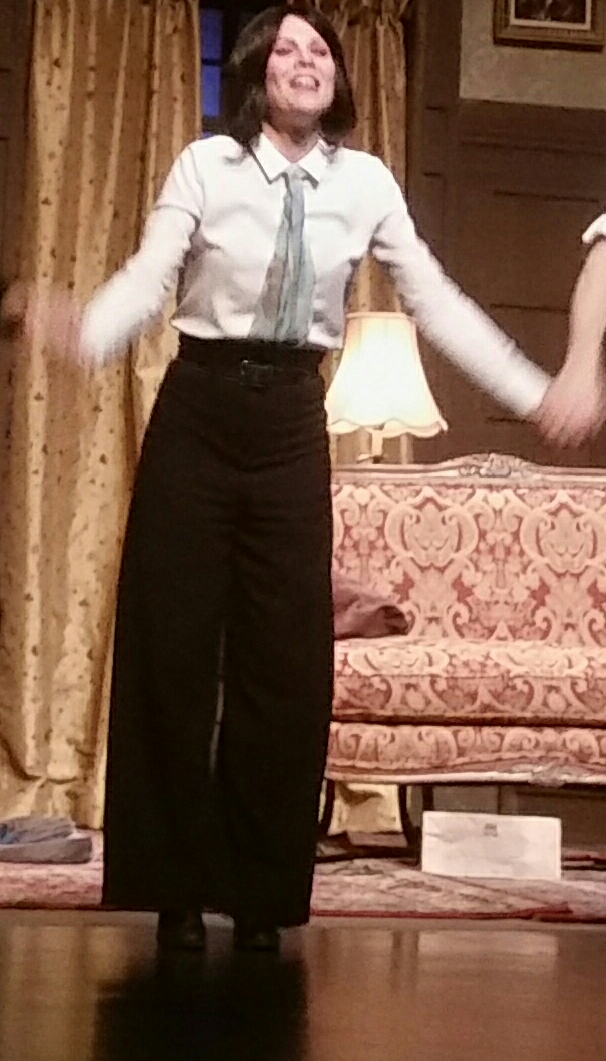
Sonia Vigneault dans

Sonia Vigneault is a French-Canadian actress, based in Montreal. She has starred in several television programs and movies, including Mogadon 7, Bouscotte, Zigrail and Providence.
