= The Michelle Apartments =

- Directed by: John Pozer
- Written by: Ross Weber
- Produced by: Stavros C. Stavrides
- Starring: Henry Czerny; Mary Beth Rubens; Daniel Kash; Peter Outerbridge; Nancy Beatty; Maria Vacratsis
- Cinematography: Peter Wunstorf
- Edited by: David Ostry
- Music by: Mark Korven
- Production company: Alliance Films
- Distributed by: Cineplex Odeon
- Release date: September 7, 1995 (TIFF)
- Running time: 91 minutes
- Country: Canada
- Language: English

The Michelle Apartments is a 1995 Canadian black comedy film directed by John Pozer and written by Ross Weber.

The film stars Henry Czerny as Alex Hartwell, a government auditor sent to the small town of Walton to review the books of a chemical company. When his hotel room is mistakenly given to another client, he is forced to take a room in the Michelle Apartments, where he is drawn into a romantic attraction to his neighbour Madeline (Mary Beth Rubens), whose husband Dean (Daniel Kash) is in prison. When Dean is released and comes home to find Madeline and Alex kissing, events spiral into a murderous chaos.

The cast also includes Peter Outerbridge, Nancy Beatty and Maria Vacratsis.

The film premiered at the 1995 Toronto International Film Festival.

== Critical response ==
For The Globe and Mail, Rick Groen called the film a northern gothic spin on Something Wild, and wrote that "the menace pulls up considerably short of skin-crawling suspense, while the sex lacks any real steam (unless you count a mild flirtation in the laundry room). These gaps may well be deliberate - Pozer's idea of comic dissonance - but the yuks just aren't there." Jay Stone of the Ottawa Citizen lambasted the film, writing that "This is independent cinema at its worst: self-indulgent, incompetent, charmless, empty. Needless to say, taxpayers helped fund it through the Ontario Film Development Corp. and Telefilm Canada. If this is the best we can do, maybe it's time to pull the plug and let Disney take over altogether." Brendan Kelly of Variety said the film "covers 'Twin Peaks'-like turf but just doesn't have enough comic smarts".

Peter Birnie of the Montreal Gazette reviewed the film more favourably, writing that "The Michelle Apartments is unnecessarily busy, especially in cafe scenes cute enough to bounce into a Bounty ad, but there's still strong impetus to Pozer's strange vision. Lynne Stopkewich designs a town of Orwellian disproportions, Peter Wunstorf photographs it all in shades of gaudy menace and Mark Korven's music makes this address arch enough to be fun."

== Awards ==
The film received two Genie Award nominations at the 16th Genie Awards, for Best Sound Editing (Paul Shikata, Tim Roberts, Andy Malcolm, Paul Germann, Steven Munro) and Best Original Score (Korven).
