= The Sound of a Voice (opera) =

2003 chamber opera by Philip Glass

- operatic adaptation by Philip Glass
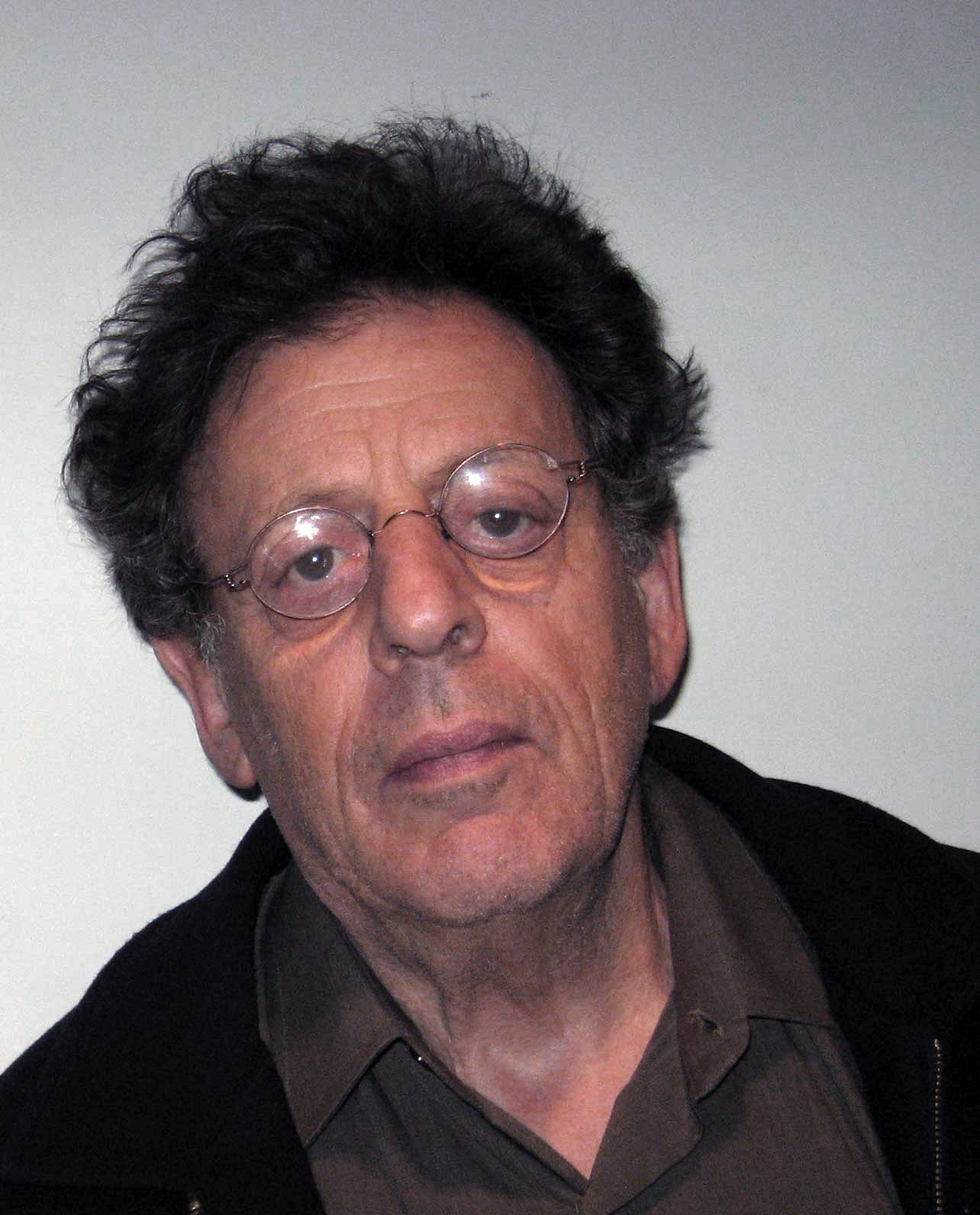
- Glass in 2007
- Librettist: David Henry Hwang
- Language: English
- Based on: Hwang's The Sound of a Voice
- Premiere: May 24, 2003; American Repertory Theater

The Sound of a Voice is a 2003 operatic adaptation of the play The Sound of a Voice by American playwright David Henry Hwang. The music is written by American composer Philip Glass and the libretto is written by Hwang. The opera is made up of two short operas: The Sound of a Voice and Hotel of Dreams. The opera is notable for being specifically written for the theatre and not an opera house. It had its premiere on May 24, 2003, at the American Repertory Theater. It was directed by Robert Woodruff and featured Eugene Perry.

The opera received its UK premiere at Hackney House, directed by Andrea Ferran, as part of the 2012 Cultural Olympiad. The production later transferred to the Arcola Theatre and Southbank Centre.
