= Curtis's Charm =

- Directed by: John L'Ecuyer
- Written by: John L'Ecuyer
- Based on: "Curtis's Charm" by Jim Carroll
- Produced by: Sandra Cunningham; Wayne A. Powell
- Starring: Maurice Dean Wint; Callum Keith Rennie; Barbara Barnes-Hopkins; Aron Tager; Rachael Crawford
- Cinematography: Harald Bachmann
- Edited by: Craig Webster
- Music by: Mark Korven
- Production company: Rabid Dog Films
- Release date: September 11, 1995 (TIFF)
- Running time: 74 minutes
- Country: Canada
- Language: English

Curtis's Charm is a 1995 Canadian comedy-drama film written and directed by John L'Ecuyer in his directorial debut. The film won a special jury citation for Best Canadian Feature Film at the 1995 Toronto International Film Festival.

Based on a short story by Jim Carroll, the film stars Maurice Dean Wint as Curtis, a paranoid drug addict who believes his mother-in-law has cast a voodoo spell on him, which has resulted in his being stalked by a killer squirrel. With the help of his friend Jim (Callum Keith Rennie), he tries to devise a talisman to protect him from the curse.

== Cast ==
- Maurice Dean Wint as Curtis
- Callum Keith Rennie as Jim
- Rachael Crawford as Cookie
- Barbara Barnes-Hopkins as Voodoo Ma
- Aron Tager as Park Worker
- Hugh Dillon as Spitting White Trash Thug

== Production ==
Filming began in April 1995, and took place over five weeks. It was shot on black and white 16 mm film.

== Release ==
Curtis's Charm premiered at the Toronto International Film Festival on September 11, 1995, where it won a special jury citation for Best Canadian Feature Film.

== Accolades ==
The film garnered two Genie Award nominations at the 17th Genie Awards in 1996:

- Best Adapted Screenplay: L'Ecuyer (nominated)
- Best Original Score: Mark Korven (won)
