= Black List (1995 film) =

1995 Canadian thriller film by Jean-Marc Vallée

- Directed by: Jean-Marc Vallée
- Written by: Sylvain Guy
- Produced by: Marcel Giroux
- Starring: Michel Côté; Geneviève Brouillette; Sylvie Bourque
- Cinematography: Pierre Gill
- Edited by: Jean-Marc Vallée
- Music by: Serge Arcuri; Luc Aubry
- Release date: 6 September 1995
- Running time: 86 minutes
- Country: Canada
- Language: French

Black List (French: Liste noire) is a 1995 Canadian thriller film. It was directed by Jean-Marc Vallée (in his feature directorial debut), written by Sylvain Guy and produced by Marcel Giroux. Black List stars Michel Côté, Geneviève Brouillette, Sylvie Bourque, André Champagne and Aubert Pallascio.

== Plot ==
Following the trial of a judge who was found with prostitute Gabrielle Angers (Geneviève Brouillette), Gabrielle gives a list of her clients to a new judge, Jacques Savard (Michel Côté), which contains the names of some very influential judges and politicians. Dead bodies and death threats follow. Jacques' own life seems to be in danger.

== Release ==
The film earned $1 million during its theatrical run in Quebec and $800,000 in the United States.

== Reception ==
Black List was the highest-grossing film in Quebec in 1995. It received nine nominations at the 16th Genie Awards, which were held on January 14, 1996.

Guy subsequently wrote and directed The List, an English-language remake of Black List which was released in 2000.

== Accolades ==
Award	Category	Recipients and nominees	Outcome
16th Genie Awards	Best Motion Picture	Marcel Giroux	Nominated
16th Genie Awards	Best Actor	Aubert Pallascio	Nominated
16th Genie Awards	Best Director	Jean-Marc Vallée	Nominated
16th Genie Awards	Best Screenplay	Sylvain Guy	Nominated
16th Genie Awards	Best Cinematography	Pierre Gill	Nominated
16th Genie Awards	Best Editing	Jean-Marc Vallée	Nominated
16th Genie Awards	Best Original Score	Luc Aubry, Serge Arcuri	Nominated
16th Genie Awards	Best Sound Editing	Diane Boucher, François Dupire, Martin Pinsonnault, Louis Dupire, Alice Wright	Nominated
16th Genie Awards	Best Overall Sound	Gavin Fernandes, Luc Boudrias, Daniel Masse, Michel Descombes	Nominated

== Works cited ==
- Turner, D. John, ed. (1987). Canadian Feature Film Index: 1913-1985. Canadian Film Institute. ISBN 0660533642.
- Marshall, Bill (2001). Quebec National Cinema. McGill–Queen's University Press. ISBN 0-7735-2103-8.
