= Natsuko Ohama =

Canadian vocal coach

Natsuko Ohama is a Canadian vocal coach, actress, and director. She is a founding member of Shakespeare & Company, Company of Women, and Los Angeles Women's Shakespeare Company (LAWSC).

== Early life and education ==
Ohama studied acting at University of Alberta for three years. She was part of The Working Theatre, an actor-teacher ensemble and training program created and taught by Joseph Chaikin, Peter Kass, and Kristin Linklater.

== Early career ==
Ohama's early acting career was primarily in New York and in other areas of the East Coast and Canada. In 1981, she played Junko Teraji in Flowers and Household Gods at La MaMa Experimental Theatre Club in New York. In 1984 at Shakespeare & Company, she played Titania in A Midsummer Night's Dream and Juliet in Romeo and Juliet, both directed by Tina Packer.

Ohama worked repeatedly with Pan Asian Repertory Theatre in New York. Some of her work there includes Teahouse (1983), Face Box (1984), Once is Never Enough(1985), Lady MacDuff in Shogun Macbeth (1986), Nancy Wing in Yellow Fever (1988), Madame De Sade in Madame De Sade (1988), and Masha in Three Sisters(1988).

She acted in plays including The Memento (Marie) at Yale Rep, directed by Dennis Scott (1987), The Love Suicides at Amijima (Narrator and Osan), directed by Jorge Cacheiro (1987) for New York Theatre Workshop, and Straight as a Line (Mum), directed by Jon Rivera (2000) for Primary Stages in New York City.

== Mid-career ==
Ohama co-founded the Los Angeles Women's’ Shakespeare Company (LAWSC). She and Lisa Wolpe co-directed a production of Hamlet in 1995 and alternated the role as well. Ohama played Friar Lawrence in Romeo and Juliet in 1993, Don John in Much Ado About Nothing in 1999, Prospero in The Tempest in 2004, and Polonius in Hamlet in 2013, in a production that she again co-directed with Wolpe.

At the Mark Taper Forum, Ohama played June in Sansei (1989), Yanina in Widows (1991), the Duchess of York and Gloucester opposite Kelsey Grammer in the lead in Richard II (1992), and Sylvia in The Poison Tree (2000), all directed by Robert Egan. She also had roles in the Taper's New Work Festival throughout the 1990s.

At East West Players, Ohama played Lily in Ikebana (1996), Chiz in Sisters Matsumoto (2002), and Mom in Mixed Messages (2004).

== Later work ==
In 2018, Ohama performed at Oregon Shakespeare Festival as Nurse Wong in Snow in Midsummer.

In 2007, she played Imelda Marcos in Dogeaters at the Kirk Douglas Theater and Mark Taper Forum; she had played the role in 2004 for SIPA. She also played Angustias in The House of Bernarda Alba for National Asian American Theatre Company (NATTCO) in New York, directed by Chay Yew and had played the role in 2000 at INTAR Theatre.

At the Getty Villa in Malibu, she played Theonoe) in Helen, directed by Jon Rivera in 2012.

In 2022, she starred in Out of Time at The Public Theater, and in 2023, she was in Deep Blue Sound at Clubbed Thumb.

== Other theatre work ==
Along with co-directing with Lisa Wolpe for LAWSC, Ohama also directed several plays including co-directing A Man Cannot Jump Over his Own Shadow at La Mama ETC in 1987.

As a playwright, Ohama wrote Morgan O Yuki: The Geisha of the Gilded Age which was commissioned and produced at the Ventford Theatre in Lenox, Massachusetts, in 2006 and remounted in 2013.

In 2018, Ohama was the dramaturg for Virginia Grise’s translation of All's Well That Ends Well for the Play On! initiative of Shakespearean play translations.

== Voice work ==
Ohama has taught master classes and workshops for decades, and she has been the vocal coach on numerous productions. She is a designated Linklater teacher.

=== Film ===
Year	Title	Role
1979	Title Shot	Terry
1988	The Laser Man	
1990	Flatliners	Professor
1991	Shanghai 1920	
1994	Speed	Mrs. Kamino
1995	Skin Deep	Alex Koyama
1997	Touch Me	Nurse
1997	Loved	Harriet
1998	Montana	Mrs. Koo
2003	Bad Santa	Pedicurist
2003	Sound of a Voice	Witch
2006	Dead Man's Chest	Cannibal Woman
2007	Rise: Blood Hunter	Sadie's Mother
2024	Claude (short)	Mom

=== Television ===
Year	Title	Role	Notes
1989	Doogie Howser, M.D.	Dr. Matsamura	1 episode
1990	Moe's World		TV Movie
1990	Hiroshima: Out of the Ashes	Mrs. Kawamoto	1 episode
1990	Blind Faith		Miniseries, 2 episodes
1991	Santa Barbara	Chinese Woman	2 episodes
1991	American Playhouse	Hatsu Hosoume	1 episode
1993	The Bold and the Beautiful	Miss Yamato	1 episode
1993	Silent Cries	Nurse Royama	1 episode
1993	Beyond Reality		1 episode
1994− 1995	Forever Knight	Capt. Amanda Cohen	Recurring role, 26 episodes
1996	The Outer Limits	Dr. Stephanie Codada	1 episode
2001	MythQuest	Noriko	1 episode
2001	E/R	Judge	1 episode
2003	Strong Medicine	Lenore	1 episode
2003	The West Wing	Dr. Gwendolyn Chen	1 episode
2003-2005	The King of Queens	May	2 episodes
2005	Life on a Stick	Markie	2 episodes
2005	Alias	Noodle Vendor	1 episode
2006	What About Brian	Mrs. Chin	1 episode
2007	In Case of Emergency	Madam	5 episodes
2007	Lincoln Heights	Pin-Mei	1 episode
2009	Nip/Tuck	Mrs. Park	1 episode
2011	The Mentalist	Elderly Lady	1 episode
2018	Curing Assholes	Director	Miniseries, 1 episode
2022	Bosch: Legacy	Sneezy's Mother	1 episode
2022	Stuck in Development	Dr. Klarty	1 episode
2023	Little Brother	Mary	1 episode
2026	Wonder Man	Trevor's Plane Seatmate	1 episode

== Teaching and honors ==
Since 2006, Ohama has taught at University of Southern California. She previously taught voice and text at California Institute of the Arts and the National Arts Center of Canada.

She is a senior artist at Pan Asian Repertory Theatre in New York.

== Awards ==
Ohama received the Playwrights Arena Award for Outstanding Contribution to the Los Angeles Theatre Community in 2018. She received a nomination for Drama Desk Award for Outstanding Actress in a Play for Sound & Beauty at The Public Theater in 1993–94.
