= Skin Deep (1995 film) =

- Directed by: Midi Onodera
- Written by: Midi Onodera; Barbara O’Kelly
- Produced by: Midi Onodera; Mehernaz Lentin
- Starring: Natsuko Ohama; Melanie Nicholls-King; Keram Malicki-Sánchez
- Cinematography: Robert MacDonald
- Edited by: Sarah Peddie
- Music by: Kathryn Moses
- Production company: Studio D
- Release date: 1995
- Running time: 85 minutes
- Country: Canada
- Language: English

Skin Deep is a 1995 Canadian film directed by filmmaker Midi Onodera and starring Natsuko Ohama, Melanie Nicholls-King, and Keram Malicki-Sánchez.

== Plot ==
Skin Deep tells the story of an award-winning director, Alex Koyama (Natsuko Ohama), who is in the process of making a film about the tattoo industry, and the love and obsession that can arise in the "skin art" culture. Conflict develops between Koyama and her lesbian lover / assistant, Montana (Melanie Nicholls-King) when Koyama hires a new production assistant, Chris (Keram Malicki-Sánchez), who is transgender and quickly becomes obsessed with Koyama.

== Production ==
Skin Deep was written, directed, and co-produced by Onodera. It was produced in cooperation with the National Film Board of Canada, with funding from

- the Canada Council
- the Ontario Arts Council
- Canadian Heritage: Multiculturalism Program
- National Association of Japanese Canadians
- Racial Equity Fund – OFDC & LIFT
- the Toronto Lesbian & Gay Appeal

== Reception ==
Skin Deep was awarded the Best Feature Film: Audience Award at the 1995 Hamburg International Lesbian & Gay Film Festival.

== See also ==
- List of LGBT films directed by women
