= Margaret's Museum =

1995 film by Mort Ransen

- Directed by: Mort Ransen
- Screenplay by: Gerald Wexler; Mort Ransen
- Based on: The Glace Bay Miners' Museum by Sheldon Currie
- Produced by: Marilyn A. Belec; Steve Clark-Hall; Claudio Luca; Mike Mahoney; Mort Ransen; Christopher Zimmer
- Starring: Helena Bonham Carter; Clive Russell; Kate Nelligan
- Cinematography: Vic Sarin
- Edited by: Rita Roy
- Music by: Milan Kymlicka
- Production companies: National Film Board of Canada; British Screen Productions; Ciné Télé Action; Glace Bay Pictures; Malofilm
- Distributed by: Astra Cinema
- Release date: 13 September 1995
- Running time: 118 minutes
- Countries: Canada; United Kingdom
- Languages: English; Scottish Gaelic

Margaret's Museum is a 1995 Canadian-British drama film directed by Mort Ransen and based on Sheldon Currie's novel The Glace Bay Miners' Museum. It stars Helena Bonham Carter, Clive Russell, and Kate Nelligan. The film won six Genie Awards, including acting awards for Bonham Carter and Nelligan.

== Plot ==
Set in the 1940s in Cape Breton Island, Nova Scotia, the film tells the story of a young girl living in a coal mining town where the death of men from accidents in "the pit" (the mines) has become almost routine. Margaret MacNeil has already lost her father and an older brother and for her, life alone would be preferable to marrying a mine worker—that is until the charming Neil Currie shows up. Against the wishes of her hard-bitten mother they marry, but, before long, financial woes lead to his doing what every other uneducated young man does in the town: take a job underground. His death in the mine, along with her younger brother, drives Margaret to a mental breakdown and, in her surreal world, she decides to create a "special" museum to the memories of all those who have died as a result of the horrific mining conditions.

== Cast ==
- Helena Bonham Carter as Margaret MacNeil
- Clive Russell as Neil Currie
- Craig Olejnik as Jimmy MacNeil
- Kate Nelligan as Catherine MacNeil
- Kenneth Welsh as Angus MacNeil
- Andrea Morris as Marilyn

== Production notes ==
Part of Margaret's Museum was filmed in the UK. It carried significance in the local area of Newtongrange, Scotland as the screen debut of local TV celebrity David MacBeath, who appeared as an extra in the film.

== Critical reception ==
Roger Ebert of the Chicago Sun-Times gave the film 3 ½ stars out 4. He praised the cast and wrote Margaret's Museum "is one of those small, nearly perfect movies that you know, seeing it, is absolutely one of a kind."

== Awards and nominations ==
Year	Ceremony	Recipient	Category	Result
1995	San Sebastián International Film Festival		Best Film	Won
1995	Vancouver International Film Festival		Most Popular Canadian Film	Won
1998	Fantasporto Awards	Helena Bonham Carter	Best Actress	Won
1996	Genie Awards		Best Motion Picture	Nominated
1996	Genie Awards	Mort Ransen	Best Achievement in Direction	Nominated
1996	Genie Awards	Clive Russell	Best Performance by an Actor in a Leading Role	Nominated
1996	Genie Awards	Helena Bonham Carter	Best Performance by an Actress in a Leading Role	Won
1996	Genie Awards	Kenneth Welsh	Best Performance by an Actor in a Supporting Role	Won
1996	Genie Awards	Kate Nelligan	Best Performance by an Actress in a Supporting Role	Won
1996	Genie Awards	Nicoletta Massone	Best Achievement in Costume Design	Won
1996	Genie Awards	William Fleming; David McHenry	Best Achievement in Art Direction/Production Design	Nominated
1996	Genie Awards	Vic Sarin	Best Achievement in Cinematography	Nominated
1996	Genie Awards	Milan Kymlicka	Best Achievement in Music – Original Score	Won
1996	Genie Awards	Mort Ransen; Gerald Wexler	Best Screenplay	Won

In 2001, an industry poll conducted by Playback named Margaret's Museum the 14th best Canadian film of the preceding 15 years.
