= Midi Onodera =

Canadian filmmaker (born 1961)

- Born: October 26, 1961 (age 64); Toronto, Ontario
- Known for: Filmmaker and video artist
- Website: www.midionodera.com

Midi Onodera is a Japanese-Canadian filmmaker. Onodera's works feature a collage of formats, from 16mm to Hi8 video and digital video to 'low end' digital toy formats, and address individual, collective, national and transnational identities.

== Early life ==
Midi Onodera grew up in an all-white mainly Jewish neighbourhood. Her grandmother came to Canada over 80 years ago, and speaks a rare combination of Japanese from the Meiji Period and English. In her last years of college she was enrolled full time in independent study, which allowed her full access to equipment available at the school. She was inspired to start her career as a filmmaker after receiving a negative criticism from her professor in her final critique who stated that she was going against the traditions of painting by writing on the canvas and telling stories.

== Education ==
Year	School
1979–1983	Ontario College of Art and Design, A.O.C.A.D.
1989	Robert McKee Writing Workshop
1994	Canadian Film Centre, Fall Lab
1998	Ryerson University, Photoshop Program
2001	Canadian Film Centre, New Media Design Programme
2007–2012	Ontario College of Art and Design, BFA program

== Career ==
Onodera was born in Toronto, Ontario. Her work is short and feature-length films and videos, and is exhibited internationally. She created over 25 independent short films as well as a theatrical feature film and numerous short videos. Beginning in 2006, Midi created almost 500 short videos for various projects. She has published two essays on mobile cinema for Jump Cut.

Feminist film scholar Judith Mayne writes that Onodera's film Ten Cents a Dance (Parallax) (1985) "is less concerned with affirmative representations of lesbian experience than with explorations of the simultaneous ambivalence and pressure of lesbianism with regard to the polarities of agency and gender." Mayne notes that this film "almost caused a riot" at the Frameline Film Festival in San Francisco.

Film scholar Catherine Russell has analyzed Onodera's "movie-a-day" project, which consisted of 365 short videos shot primarily on a "VcamNow" toy digital camera. Russell described the videos as being "like a surprise package or candy to unwrap, taste, and dissolve in your mouth – or in your hand as the case may be." She argues that "the project articulates another spatial and temporal world, which is that of digital media – a fragmentary, networked, omnipresent world in which the subject is infinitely disperse."

Performance artists Tanya Mars, called her "a thoughtful, daring filmmaker at a time when there was very little diversity in Canadian art".

Midi Onodera has also been a panellist, jury member, guest speaker, and lecturer for over 50 different film organisations, institutions and Universities around the world. Some of her most notable appearances are, a Guest Speaker for a Canadian Cinema class at Meiji Gaukin University in Tokyo, Japan in 2008, a jury member for the 2002 Toronto Arts Council and a panellist for various discussions for the Winnipeg Film Group in 2015.

She currently works for MAC Cosmetics as a media consultant, director and producer.

== Filmography ==
- Untitled (1979)
- Contemplation (1979)
- Reality-Illusion (1979)
- A Film (1980)
- Filter Queen (1980)
- The Bird That Chirped On Bathurst (1981)
- Home Movies (1981)
- Food Trilogy (1981)
  - What's For Lunch Charley?
  - One Burger, Hold the Pickle
  - Aprés Diner
- Endocrine (1982)
- One If By Land, Two If By Sea (1982)
- Idiot's Delight (1983)
- Home Was Never Like This (1983)
- Ville Quelle Ville (1984)
- Ten Cents a Dance: Parallax (1985)
- Made In Japan (1985)
- After Car Crash, Woman Kills Two (1985)
- The Dead Zone (1985)
- The Displaced View (1988)
- Then/Now (1988)
- General Idea – Artist's Profile (1989)
- David Cronenberg – Artist's Profile (1990)
- Heartbreak Hoteru (1990)
- A Performance by Jack Smith (1992)
- Skin Deep (1995)
- the basement girl (2000)
- Slightseer (2001)
- Nobody Knows (2002)
- Alphagirls (2002)
- I have no memory of my direction (2005)
- 365 Short Videos (2006)
- First Bloom, shortlisted at Filminute 2007 (2007)
- A Movie a Week (2009)
- The Coyotes Must See the Moon... (2017)
- Down the Drain (2017)
- Nuts (2017)

== Awards ==
Year	Award	Festival	Film
2018	Governor General's Award in Visual Media and Arts	Canada Council for the Arts	
2015	Lifetime Achievement Award	Toronto Urban Film Festival	
2008	Honorable Mention	Toronto Reel Asian International Film Festival	A Movie A Day
2006	Honorable Mention	Ann Arbor Film Festival	I Have No Memory of My Direction
2006	Honorable Mention	Mobifest	If These Walls Could Talk
2001	Best Lesbian Short Film	Girlfriends magazine's Sapphos 2001 Movie Awards	The Basement Girl
1995	Best Feature Film: Audience Award	Hamburg International Lesbian & Gay Film Festival	Skin Deep
1995	Best Short Film: Special Judges' Award	Hamburg International Lesbian & Gay Film Festival	Ten Cents a Dance (Parallax)
1989	Best Documentary (nominated)	Gemini Awards	The Displaced View
1989	Special Citation	Gemini Awards	The Displaced View
1988	Honorable Mention, Golden Gate Award	San Francisco International Film Festival	The Displaced View

== See also ==
- List of female film and television directors
- List of lesbian filmmakers
- List of LGBT-related films directed by women
