= List of Canadian films of 2000 =

This is a list of Canadian films which were released in 2000:

Title	Director	Cast	Genre	Notes
Apartment Hunting	Bill Robertson	Kari Matchett, Rachel Hayward, Arnold Pinnock, Tracy Wright	Romantic comedy	
The Art of War	Christian Duguay	Wesley Snipes, Anne Archer, Maury Chaykin, Donald Sutherland, Marie Matiko	Action	Golden Reel Award; made with U.S. financing
Backroads	Shirley Cheechoo	Renae Morriseau, Max Martini, Sheila Tousey	Drama	
Between the Moon and Montevideo	Attila Bertalan	Attila Bertalan, Pascale Bussières	Science fiction	
Blacktop	T. J. Scott	Meat Loaf, Kristin Davis	Thriller	Made for TV
The Bottle (La bouteille)	Alain DesRochers	Réal Bossé, François Papineau, Jean Lapointe	Comedy-drama	
Bully Dance	Janet Perlman		National Film Board animated short	
Camera	David Cronenberg	David Cronenberg	Short film	
Casper's Haunted Christmas	Owen Hurley	voices Brendan Ryan Barrett, Kathleen Barr, Ian James Corlett	Animated feature	Made for DVD release
Cinéma Vérité: Defining the Moment	Peter Wintonick	Narrated by Jacques Godbout	National Film Board documentary	
Clean Rite Cowboy	Michael Downing	John Robinson, Christie MacFadyen, Gloria Slade, Tracy Wright	Short drama	
Clutch	Chris Grismer	David Hewlett, Tanya Allen, Gordon Michael Woolvett, Peter Spence	Crime comedy, drama	
Children of My Heart	Keith Ross Leckie	Geneviève Désilets, Geneviève Bujold, Michael Moriarty	Drama	Adaptation of novel by Gabrielle Roy
The Claim	Michael Winterbottom	Peter Mullan, Milla Jovovich, Wes Bentley, Nastassja Kinski, Sarah Polley	Western, Romance	Canada-U.K.-France co-production
Cord	Sidney J. Furie	Daryl Hannah, Jennifer Tilly, Bruce Greenwood, Vincent Gallo	Thriller	
Crackie	Sherry White	Mary Walsh, Joel Thomas Hynes	Drama	
Death, Deceit and Destiny Aboard the Orient Express	Mark Roper	Richard Grieco, Christoph Waltz, Romina Mondello	Thriller	Made for DVD release; Canada-Bulgaria co-production made with U.S. financing
Deeply	Sheri Elwood	Julia Brendler, Kirsten Dunst, Lynn Redgrave, Julia Brendler, Trent Ford, Brent Carver	Drama	Canada-German co-production
Desire	Colleen Murphy	Katja Riemann, Zachary Bennett, Elizabeth Shepherd, Martin Donovan	Drama	
Eisenstein	Renny Bartlett	Simon McBurney, Raymond Coulthard, Jacqueline McKenzie	Biopic of the Russian film director Sergei Eisenstein	Canada-German co-production
Ernest	Keith Behrman	David Reale, Frank Moore	Short comedy	
The Fairy Faith	John Walker		Documentary	
Family Pack (Que faisaient les femmes pendant que l'homme marchait sur la lune?)	Chris Vander Stappen	Marie Bunel, Hélène Vincent, Mimie Mathy, Tsilla Chelton, Macha Grenon, Christian Crahay, Emmanuel Bilodeau	Drama	Belgian, French, Swiss and Canadian coproduction
Foxy Lady, Wild Cherry	Inez Buchli	Natasha Greenblatt, Nina Schock, Todd Duckworth, J. D. Nicholsen	Short drama	
Franklin and the Green Knight	John van Bruggen	voices Noah Reid, Elizabeth Brown, Richard Newman	Animated feature	Made for DVD release
From the Big Bang to Tuesday Morning (Du big bang à mardi matin)	Claude Cloutier		National Film Board animated short	
Ginger Snaps	John Fawcett	Emily Perkins, Katharine Isabelle, Kris Lemche, Mimi Rogers, Danielle Hampton	Horror	Best Film, International Horror Guild
A Girl Is a Girl	Reginald Harkema	Andrew McIntyre, Paige Morrison	Drama	
Guantanamera Boxe	Richard Jean-Baptiste, Yann Langevin		Documentary	
The Heart of the World	Guy Maddin	Leslie Bais, Caelum Vatnsdal, Shaun Balbar, Greg Klymkiw	Short	
Heaven (Le petit ciel)	Jean-Sébastien Lord	Jocelyn Blanchard, Garance Clavel, Julien Poulin	Comedy-drama	
Heavy Metal 2000	Michel Lemire & Michael Coldewey	voices Michael Ironside, Billy Idol, Julie Strain, Sonja Ball	Animated feature	Canada-Germany co-production; sequel to 1981 film Heavy Metal
Here's to Life!	Arne Olsen	Eric McCormack, James Whitmore, Kim Hunter, Ossie Davis	Comedy-drama	
Hochelaga	Michel Jetté	Dominic Darceuil, David Boutin, Ronald Houle	Crime drama	Prix Jutra – Supporting Actor (Boutin)
The Holier It Gets	Jennifer Baichwal		Documentary	
If Only I	Donigan Cumming		Documentary	
Inséparables	Normand Bergeron	Stéphane Crête, Évelyne Rompré	Short drama	
Johnny Greyeyes	Jorge Manzano	Gail Maurice, Columpa Bobb	Prison drama	
The Law of Enclosures	John Greyson	Sarah Polley, Brendan Fletcher, Diane Ladd	Drama based on the novel by Dale Peck	Genie Award – Actor (Fletcher)
Left Behind: The Movie	Vic Sarin	Kirk Cameron, Brad Johnson, Gordon Currie, Colin Fox	Religious drama	
The Left-Hand Side of the Fridge (La Moitié gauche du frigo)	Philippe Falardeau	Paul Ahmarani, Stéphane Demers	Faux-documentary	Claude Jutra Award; Prix Jutra – Actor (Ahmarani); TIFF – Best Canadian First Feature
Life After Love (La Vie après l'amour)	Gabriel Pelletier	Michel Côté, Sylvie Léonard, Patrick Huard	Comedy	
Life Under Mike	James Motluk	Jack Layton, John Kenneth Galbraith	Documentary	Media Human Rights Award
Love Come Down	Clement Virgo	Larenz Tate, Deborah Cox, Martin Cummins, Rainbow Sun Francks, Sarah Polley, Barbara Williams	Family drama	Genie Awards – Supporting Actor (Cummins), Sound
Low Self-Esteem Girl	Blaine Thurier	Corrina Hammond, Rob McBeth, Dan Bejar, Carl Newman	Comedy-drama	
Maelström	Denis Villeneuve	Marie-Josee Croze, Stéphanie Morgenstern, voice Pierre Lebeau	Drama	
Man of Grease	Ezra Soiferman	Tony Koulakis	Documentary	
Marine Life	Anne Wheeler	Cybill Shepherd, Peter Outerbridge, Alexandra Purvis, Michael Hogan	Drama	Made with U.S. financing
Mr. Rice's Secret	Nicholas Kendall	David Bowie, Bill Switzer, Teryl Rothery, Garwin Sanford	Drama	
Murder Seen	Rob W. King	Nicole Eggert	Crime drama	Made for TV
My Left Breast	Gerry Rogers	Gerry Rogers, Peg Norman	Documentary	
MVP: Most Valuable Primate	Robert Vince	Kevin Zegers, Jamie Renée Smith, Oliver Muirhead, Rick Ducommun	Family film	Made with U.S. financing
No More Monkeys Jumpin' on the Bed	Ross Weber	Nancy Sivak, Tom Scholte, Frida Betrani, Babz Chula	Drama	
Nuremberg	Yves Simoneau	Alec Baldwin, Brian Cox, Christopher Plummer, Jill Hennessy, Matt Craven, Colm Feore, Christopher Heyerdahl, Michael Ironside, Max von Sydow	TV miniseries, docudrama	About the Nuremberg war-crimes trials following the Second World War.
Once Upon a Christmas	Tibor Takács	Kathy Ireland, John Dye	Family film	Made for TV
The Orphan Muses (Les Muses orphelines)	Robert Favreau	Marina Orsini, Céline Bonnier, Fanny Mallette. Louise Portal	Drama	Prix Jutra – Musical Score
Out of the Fire	Shelley Saywell	Faye Schulman	Documentary	
Pandora's Beauty (La Beauté de Pandore)	Charles Binamé	Pascale Bussières	Drama	
The Perfect Son	Leonard Farlinger	Colm Feore, David Cubitt, Chandra West	Drama	
Possible Worlds	Robert Lepage	Tilda Swinton, Tom McCamus, Sean McCann, Daniel Brooks	Drama based on a play by Robert Lepage	Genie Award – Editing, Art Direction
Protection	Bruce Spangler	Jillian Fargey, Nancy Sivak, William MacDonald	Drama	
Rats & Rabbits	Lewis Furey	Carole Laure, Nigel Bennett, Andrew Tarbet, Paul Ahmarani, Tom Barnett	Drama	Canada-France co-production
Red Deer	Anthony Couture	Awaovieyi Agie, Loreya Montayne, Amber Rothwell, Kurt Max Runte, James Hutson, Joe Procyk	Drama	
The Road to El Dorado	Eric "Bibo" Bergeron, Don Paul	Kevin Kline, Kenneth Branagh, Rosie Perez, Armand Assante, Edward James Olmos	Animated adventure comedy	Co-production with the US
Rocket Man	Daniel Cockburn		Short experimental film	
Rocks at Whiskey Trench	Alanis Obomsawin		Documentary	
Romain et Juliette	Frédéric Lapierre	Lionel Villeneuve, Hélène Loiselle, Gabriel Gascon, Louise Portal	Short drama	
Saint Jude	John L'Ecuyer	Liane Balaban, Nicholas Campbell, Kris Lemche, Victoria Sanchez, Bernie Coulson, Louise Portal	Drama	
Searching for Louis Archambault (À la recherche de Louis Archambault)	Werner Volkmer	Louis Archambault	Documentary	
Shooter	Mark Morgenstern	Stephanie Morgenstern	Short	
Sole Survivor	Mikael Salomon	Billy Zane, Gloria Reuben, Isabella Hofmann, Mitchell Kosterman	TV miniseries	Based on the novel by Dean Koontz
The Spreading Ground	Derek Vanlint	Dennis Hopper	Crime drama	Entered into the 22nd Moscow International Film Festival
Stardom	Denys Arcand	Jessica Paré, Dan Aykroyd, Robert Lepage, Charles Berling, Frank Langella, Camilla Rutherford	Drama, satire	Genie Award – Costumes; Canada-France co-production
Subconscious Cruelty	Karim Hussain	Brea Asher	Horror	Straight to DVD
Suspicious River	Lynne Stopkewich	Molly Parker, Callum Keith Rennie	Drama	
The Three Madeleines (Les fantômes des trois Madeleines)	Guylaine Dionne	Sylvie Drapeau, France Arbour, Isadora Galwey, Isabelle Blais	Drama	
Three Stories from the End of Everything	Semi Chellas	Soo Garay, John Robinson, Lucas Denton, Kristen Ross	Short drama	
Too Much Sex	Andrew Ainsworth	Janet Kidder, Diane Flacks	Sex comedy	
Traitor or Patriot (Traître ou Patriote)	Jacques Godbout		National Film Board documentary	Legacy of director's great-uncle, Adélard Godbout
Two Thousand and None	Arto Paragamian	John Turturro	Dark comedy	
The Uncles	James Allodi	Chris Owens, Kelly Harms, Tara Rosling	Dark comedy	
Vinyl	Alan Zweig	Alan Zweig, Harvey Pekar	Documentary	World of record collecting
Violet	Rosemary House	Mary Walsh, Andrew Younghusband, Susan Kent, Peter MacNeill	Comedy	
waydowntown	Gary Burns	Fab Filippo, Don McKellar	Black comedy	Best Canadian feature at TIFF; TFCA – Best Canadian Film
We All Fall Down	Martin Cummins	Helen Shaver, Martin Cummins, Nicholas Campbell, René Auberjonois	Drama	Genie Award – Supporting Actress (Shaver)
The Widow of Saint-Pierre	Patrice Leconte	Juliette Binoche, Daniel Auteuil, Emir Kusturica, Michel Duchaussoy	Historical drama, romance	Canada-France co-production
XChange	Allan Moyle	Stephen Baldwin, Kim Coates, Kyle MacLachlan, Pascale Bussières, Janet Kidder	Science fiction	Straight to DVD

== See also ==
- 2000 in Canada
- 2000 in Canadian television
