= 2000 Toronto International Film Festival =

Annual Canadian film festival

- Festival poster
- Opening film: Stardom
- Location: Toronto, Ontario, Canada
- Hosted by: Toronto International Film Festival Group
- No. of films: 330 films and 25 shorts
- Festival date: September 7, 2000–September 16, 2000
- Language: English
- Website: web.archive.org/web/20010203223900/http://e.bell.ca/filmfest/2000/index.asp
- 2001 1999

The 2000 Toronto International Film Festival, the 25th annual festival, ran from September 7 to September 16, 2000. Along with special events to commemorate the anniversary, there were a total of 330 films screened. There was a special screening of Sergei Eisenstein's Alexander Nevsky featuring musical accompaniment by the Toronto Symphony Orchestra with the Toronto Mendelssohn Choir. Also, 25 digital video shorts were made by attending filmmakers.

== Awards ==
Award	Film	Director
People's Choice Award	Crouching Tiger, Hidden Dragon	Ang Lee
Discovery Award (tie)	George Washington	David Gordon Green
Discovery Award (tie)	101 Reykjavík	Baltasar Kormákur
Best Canadian Feature Film	Waydowntown	Gary Burns
Best Canadian Feature Film - Special Jury Citation	Maelström	Denis Villeneuve
Best Canadian Feature Film - Special Jury Citation	Ginger Snaps	Karen Walton (writer)
Best Canadian First Feature Film	The Left-Hand Side of the Fridge	Philippe Falardeau
Best Canadian First Feature Film - Special Jury Citation	Red Deer	Anthony Couture
Best Canadian Short Film	The Hat (Le Chapeau)	Michèle Cournoyer
Best Canadian Short Film - Special Mention	Ernest	Keith Behrman
FIPRESCI International Critics' Award	Bangkok Dangerous	Pang Fat & Oxide Pang Chun

== Programme ==
=== Gala Presentations ===
- Almost Famous by Cameron Crowe
- Best In Show by Christopher Guest
- Bread and Tulips by Silvio Soldini
- The Contender by Rod Lurie
- Crouching Tiger, Hidden Dragon by Ang Lee
- The Dish by Rob Sitch
- Dr. T and the Women by Robert Altman
- The House of Mirth by Terence Davies
- How to Kill Your Neighbor's Dog by Michael Kalesniko
- In the Mood for Love by Wong Kar-wai
- The Luzhin Defence by Marleen Gorris
- Men of Honor by George Tillman Jr.
- Pandaemonium by Julien Temple
- Sexy Beast by Jonathan Glazer
- Stardom by Denys Arcand
- La Veuve de Saint-Pierre by Patrice Leconte
- The Weight of Water by Kathryn Bigelow

=== Special Presentations ===
- Beautiful by Sally Field
- Before Night Falls by Julian Schnabel
- Chinese Coffee by Al Pacino
- Dancing at the Blue Iguana by Michael Radford
- Duets by Bruce Paltrow
- Faithless by Liv Ullmann
- Greenfingers by Joel Hershman
- Innocence by Paul Cox
- ivansxtc. (To Live and Die in Hollywood) by Bernard Rose
- Liam by Stephen Frears
- Lumumba by Raoul Peck
- Pollock by Ed Harris
- Possible Worlds by Robert Lepage
- Princes et princesses by Michel Ocelot
- The Princess and the Warrior by Tom Tykwer
- Shadow of the Vampire by E. Elias Merhige
- A Shot at Glory by Michael Corrente
- Sous le sable by François Ozon
- State and Main by David Mamet
- Tigerland by Joel Schumacher
- The Yards by James Gray
- You Can Count on Me by Kenneth Lonergan

=== Masters ===
- Bread and Roses by Ken Loach
- Brother by Takeshi Kitano
- La Captive by Chantal Akerman
- Chunhyang by Im Kwontaek
- Code Inconnu by Michael Haneke
- Comédie de l'innocence by Raoul Ruiz
- Gohatto by Nagisa Oshima
- The Legends of Rita by Volker Schlöndorff
- Merci pour le chocolat by Claude Chabrol
- My Generation by Barbara Kopple
- Such is Life by Arturo Ripstein
- Turbulence by Ruy Guerra
- Werckmeister Harmonies by Béla Tarr
- The Wrestlers by Buddhadeb Dasgupta
- Yi Yi (A One and a Two) by Edward Yang

=== Perspective Canada ===
- Abe's Manhood by Aubrey Nealon
- After Eden by John Price
- Atomic Saké by Louise Archambault
- The Basement Girl by Midi Onodera
- Bowie: One in a Million by Janis Cole
- Clean Rite Cowboy by Michael Downing
- De l'art et la manière chez Denys Arcand by Georges Dufaux
- Deeply by Sheri Elwood
- Desire by Colleen Murphy
- Dinky Menace by Robert Kennedy
- Ernest by Keith Behrman
- FILM(lode) by Deco Dawson
- Foxy Lady, Wild Cherry by Ines Buchli
- Ginger Snaps by John Fawcett
- The Hat (Le Chapeau) by Michèle Cournoyer
- Hindsight by Susan Shipton
- Landscaping by Paul Carrière
- The Law of Enclosures by John Greyson
- The Left-Hand Side of the Fridge by Philippe Falardeau
- Like a Dream that Vanishes by Barbara Sternberg
- The Lost Bundefjord Expedition by Matt Holm
- Love Come Down by Clement Virgo
- Low Self-Esteem Girl by Blaine Thurier
- Maelström by Denis Villeneuve
- Marine Life by Anne Wheeler
- Monday with the Martins by Jeffery Erbach
- Moon Palace by David Weaver
- New Neighbours by Anita McGee
- Parsley Days by Andrea Dorfman
- Passengers by Francine Zuckerman
- The Perfect Son by Leonard Farlinger
- Poe by Gregory Nixon
- Red Deer by Anthony Couture
- Rocks at Whiskey Trench by Alanis Obomsawin
- Saint Jude by John L'Ecuyer
- Sea in the Blood by Richard Fung
- Subrosa by Helen Lee
- Suspicious River by Lynne Stopkewich
- Take-Out by Jean-François Monette
- Three Stories from the End of Everything by Semi Chellas
- Traces on the Rock of Elsewhere (Traces dans le rocher du lointain) by Majdi El-Omari
- Two Thousand and None by Arto Paragamian
- The Uncles by James Allodi
- Via Crucis by Serge Denoncourt
- The Walnut Tree by Elida Schogt
- Waydowntown by Gary Burns
- We All Fall Down by Martin Cummins
- What About Me: The Rise of the Nihilist Spasm Band by Zev Asher
- When Morning Comes by Charles Officer

=== Contemporary World Cinema ===
- Aberdeen by Hans Petter Moland
- Amores Perros by Alejandro González Iñárritu
- Angels of the Universe by Fridrik Thór Fridriksson
- April Captains by Maria de Medeiros
- Attraction by Russell DeGrazier
- Better Than Sex by Jonathan Teplitzky
- Billy Elliot by Stephen Daldry
- Blackboards by Samira Makhmalbaf
- Born Romantic by David Kane
- Brave New Land by Lúcia Murat
- Burnt Money by Marcelo Piñeyro
- Chasing Sleep by Michael Walker
- The Circle by Jafar Panahi
- Clouds of May by Nuri Bilge Ceylan
- Collision Course by Roberval Duarte
- Daily Bread by Ane Muñoz Mitxelena
- The Debt by Krzysztof Krauze
- Les Destinées Sentimentales by Olivier Assayas
- Djomeh by Hassan Yektapanah
- Dog Food by Carlos Siguion-Reyna
- Durian Durian by Fruit Chan
- Eistenstein by Renny Bartlett
- Eureka by Shinji Aoyama
- Face by Junji Sakamoto
- Farewell by Jan Schütte
- Fast Food, Fast Women by Amos Kollek
- The Film Biker by Mel Chionglo
- Flower of Manila by Joel Lamangan
- Freedom by Sharunas Bartas
- Friends Have Reasons by Gerardo Herrero
- Girlfight by Karyn Kusama
- The Goddess of 1967 by Clara Law
- Gojoe by Sogo Ishii
- Harry, un ami qui vous veut du bien by Dominik Moll
- Hey Ram by Kamal Haasan
- Holdup by Florian Flicker
- Hunters in the Snow by Michael Kreihsl
- The Isle by Kim Ki-duk
- Juliet in Love by Wilson Yip
- Kaza-hana by Shinji Somai
- Kimono by Hal Hartley
- The King is Alive by Kristian Levring
- Kippur by Amos Gitaï
- Krámpack by Cesc Gay
- À la verticale de l'été by Tran Anh Hung
- Landscape by Martin Sulík
- The Last Resort by Paul Pawlikowski
- Little Cheung by Fruit Chan
- Lockdown by John Luessenhop
- Manila by Romuald Karmakar
- Me, You, Them by Andrucha Waddington
- The Mechanism by Đorđe Milosavljević
- Memento by Christopher Nolan
- La moitié du ciel by Alain Mazars
- The Monkey's Mask by Samantha Lang
- The Nine Lives of Tomas Katz by Ben Hopkins
- No Place to Go by Oskar Roehler
- Nuts for Love by Alberto Lecchi
- Peppermint by Costas Kapakas
- Petite chérie by Anne Villacèque
- Placido Rizzotto by Pasquale Scimeca
- Platform by Jia Zhangke
- The Price of Milk by Harry Sinclair
- Requiem for a Dream by Darren Aronofsky
- Risk by Alan White
- A Rumor of Angels by Peter O'Fallon
- Sade by Benoît Jacquot
- Samia by Philippe Faucon
- Seance by Kiyoshi Kurosawa
- Seven Songs From the Tundra by Anastasia Lapsui and Markku Lehmuskallio
- Shadow Magic by Ann Hu
- Signs & Wonders by Jonathan Nossiter
- Smell of Camphor, Fragrance of Jasmine by Bahman Farmanara
- Songs from the Second Floor by Roy Andersson
- The Stranger by Götz Spielmann
- Suzhou River by Lou Ye
- Swedish Beauty by Daniel Fridell
- Teeth by Gabriele Salvatores
- Thomas est amoureux by Pierre-Paul Renders
- A Time for Drunken Horses by Bahman Ghobadi
- To Die (Or Not) by Ventura Pons
- The Truth About Tully by Hilary Birmingham
- Two Family House by Raymond De Felitta
- Urbania by Jon Shear
- Vengo by Tony Gatlif
- La ville est tranquille by Robert Guédiguian
- Virgin Stripped Bare by Her Bachelors by Hong Sang-soo
- Une vraie jeune fille by Catherine Breillat
- Waiting for the Messiah by Daniel Burman
- Waiting List by Juan Carlos Tabío
- Walk the Talk by Shirley Barrett
- The Wedding by Pavel Lungin
- When Brendan Met Trudy by Kieron J. Walsh
- When the Sky Falls by John Mackenzie
- Wild Blue: Notes for Several Voices by Thierry Knauff
- With Closed Eyes by Mansur Madavi

=== Discovery ===
- 10 Minutes by Juan Carlos Rulfo
- 101 Reykjavík by Baltasar Kormákur
- 19 by Kazushi Watanabe
- Aïe by Sophie Fillières
- alaska.de by Esther Gronenborn
- Baise-moi by Virginie Despentes and Coralie Trinh Thi
- Bangkok Dangerous by Oxide Pang and Danny Pang
- Bunny by Mia Trachinger
- Chill Out by Andreas Struck
- Chopper by Andrew Dominik
- City Loop by Belinda Chayko
- Compassionate Sex by Laura Mañá
- The Day I Became A Woman by Marziyeh Meshkini
- Dust to Dust by Juan Carlos de Llaca
- Les filles ne savent pas nager by Anne-Sophie Birot
- George Washington by David Gordon Green
- The Girl by Sande Zeig
- In God We Trust by Jason Reitman
- Interstate 84 by Ross Partridge
- The Iron Ladies by Yongyoot Thongkongtoon
- Loners by David Ondrícek
- The Low Down by Jamie Thraves
- The Most Fertile Man in Ireland by Dudi Appleton
- Night Kiss by Boris Rodriguez Arroyo
- The Red One: Triumph by Oleg Pogodin and Vladimir Alenikov
- Scarlet Diva by Asia Argento
- Scoutman by Masato Ishioka
- Vulgar by Bryan Johnson
- The Young Unknowns by Catherine Jelski

=== Planet Africa ===
- Adanggaman by Roger Gnoan M'Bala
- Ali Zaoua by Nabil Ayouch
- Are You Cinderella? by Charles Hall
- Auguy by Munga Tunda Djo
- Bàttu by Cheick Oumar Sissoko
- Bye Bye Africa by Mahamat Saleh Haroun
- Christmas With Granny by Dumisani Phakathi
- The Elevator by Alrick Riley
- En Face by Zina Modiano and Mehdi Ben Attia
- Hijack Stories by Oliver Schmitz
- El Medina by Yousry Nasrallah
- One Week by Carl Seaton
- Passage du milieu by Guy Deslauriers
- La saison des hommes by Moufida Tlatli
- La Squale by Fabrice Genestal
- The Station by Aaron Woolfolk
- Tourbillons by Alain Gomis
- Vacances Au Pays by Jean-Marie Teno

=== Real to Reel ===
- Asylum by Chris Petit and Iain Sinclair
- Breathe In/Breathe Out by Beth Billingsly
- Calle 54 by Fernando Trueba
- Crazy by Heddy Honigmann
- Erik Bruhn: I'm the Same- Only More by Lennart Pasborg
- Fighter by Amir Bar-Lev
- The First and the Last... by Momir Matovic
- Gaea Girls by Kim Longinotto and Jano Williams
- Les glaneurs et la glaneuse by Agnès Varda
- Into the Arms of Strangers: Stories of the Kindertransport by Mark Jonathan Harris
- Jour de nuit by Dieter Fahrer and Bernhard Nick
- One Day in the Life of Andrei Arsenevich by Chris Marker
- Kalamandalam Gopi by Adoor Gopalakrishnan
- Keep the River On Your Right: A Modern Cannibal Tale by Laurie Gwen Shapiro and David Shapiro
- The Long Holiday by Johan van der Keuken
- The Man Who Bought Mustique by Joseph Bullman
- The Natural History of the Chicken by Mark Lewis
- Paragraph 175 by Rob Epstein and Jeffery Friedman
- The Prince is Back by Marina Goldovskaya
- La règle du je by Françoise Romand
- Soldiers in the Army of God by Marc Levin and Daphne Pinkerson
- The Turandot Project by Allan Miller
- Unchain by Toyoda Toshiaki

=== Dialogues: Talking with Pictures ===
- The Bicycle Thief by Vittorio de Sica
- Blue Velvet by David Lynch
- Do The Right Thing by Spike Lee
- Performance by Nicolas Roeg and Donald Cammell
- Raven's End by Bo Widerberg
- The Sacrifice by Andrei Tarkovsky

=== 25th Anniversary Special Events ===
- 25 x 25 (twenty-five digital video shorts made by attending filmmakers)
- Alexander Nevsky by Sergei Eisenstein

The Bloomberg Tribute to Stephen Frears

- Dangerous Liaisons by Stephen Frears
- The Grifters by Stephen Frears
- The Hit by Stephen Frears
- My Beautiful Laundrette by Stephen Frears
- Prick Up Your Ears by Stephen Frears
- Sammy and Rosie Get Laid by Stephen Frears

=== Year 1 ===
- The Context by Francesco Rosi
- Cousin, cousine by Jean-Charles Tacchella
- Dersu Uzala by Akira Kurosawa
- The Devil's Playground by Fred Schepisi
- L'eau chaude l'eau frette by André Forcier
- Grey Gardens by Albert Maysles and David Maysles
- Harlan County, USA by Barbara Kopple
- Kings of the Road by Wim Wenders

=== Beckett on Film ===
- Act Without Words 1 by Karel Reisz
- Catastrophe by David Mamet
- Endgame by Conor McPherson
- Happy Days by Patricia Rozema
- Krapp's Last Tape by Atom Egoyan
- Not I by Neil Jordan
- Play by Anthony Minghella
- Rockaby by Sir Richard Eyre
- Rough For Theatre 1 by Kieron J. Walsh
- What Where by Damien O'Donnell

=== Preludes ===
Preludes was a special one-off program of ten short films by Canadian film directors, commissioned by TIFF to celebrate its 25th anniversary. The Preludes films were also subsequently screened on the web separately from their screenings at TIFF, on a platform funded by Bell Canada.

- Camera by David Cronenberg
- The Line by Atom Egoyan
- Congratulations by Mike Jones
- See You in Toronto by Jean Pierre Lefebvre
- The Heart of the World by Guy Maddin
- A Word from the Management by Don McKellar
- 24fps by Jeremy Podeswa
- This Might Be Good by Patricia Rozema
- Prelude by Michael Snow
- Legs Apart by Anne Wheeler

=== Spotlight: Robert Beavers ===
- Amor by Robert Beavers
- From the Notebook of... by Robert Beavers
- The Painting by Robert Beavers
- Ruskin by Robert Beavers
- Sotiros by Robert Beavers
- The Stoas by Robert Beavers
- Wingseed by Robert Beavers
- Work Done by Robert Beavers

=== Canadian Open Vault ===
- Tit-Coq by Gratien Gélinas and René Delacroix

=== Midnight Madness ===
- 6ixtynin9 by Pen-ek Ratanaruang
- The American Nightmare by Adam Simon
- The City of Lost Souls by Miike Takashi
- The Foul King by Kim Jeewoon
- The Irrefutable Truth about Demons by Glenn Standring
- The Mission by Johnnie To Kei-Fung
- Quartered at Dawn by Norbert Keil
- Tell Me Something by Chang Yoon-hyun
- Time and Tide by Tsui Hark
- Wild Zero by Tetsuro Takeuchi
