= Red Deer (disambiguation) =

The red deer (Cervus elaphus) is a large mammal endemic to Europe, Western Asia and North Africa.

Red Deer may also refer to:

== Animals ==
Central Asian red deer, now oft considered a distinct species

== Places in Canada ==
- Red Deer, Alberta, a city
  - Red Deer (federal electoral district), a federal constituency
  - Red Deer (provincial electoral district), defunct constituency
  - Red Deer County, a larger municipal district
  - Red Deer Polytechnic, a college
- Red Deer River, in Alberta and Saskatchewan (from which the city is named)
- Red Deer River (Manitoba), in Manitoba and Saskatchewan
- Red Deer Hill, Saskatchewan

== Other uses ==
- HMCS Red Deer, a minesweeper in the Royal Canadian Navy
- Red Deer Rebels, an ice hockey team in Red Deer, Alberta, Canada
- Red Deer (film), a Canadian drama film

== See also ==
- Red Deer Lake (disambiguation), several lakes
- Red Deer Cave people, early hominids
