= Christmas List =

Christmas List may refer to:

- Christmas list
- The Christmas List, a 1997 TV movie
