= Let the Daylight Into the Swamp =

- Film poster
- Directed by: Jeffrey St. Jules
- Written by: Jeffrey St. Jules
- Produced by: Anita Lee
- Starring: Colombe Demers; Pierre Simpson; Sean McCann; Diana Leblanc
- Narrated by: Matthew Rankin
- Cinematography: John M. Tran
- Edited by: Lawrence Jackman; Stephen Philipson
- Music by: Darren Fung
- Production company: National Film Board of Canada
- Release date: September 12, 2012 (TIFF)
- Running time: 37 minutes
- Country: Canada

Let the Daylight Into the Swamp is a 2012 Canadian short docudrama film, directed by Jeffrey St. Jules. Exploring the breakup of his grandparents Donal and Hélène soon after his father's birth, the film is narrated by Matthew Rankin, and dramatizes the original events as acted by a cast that includes Pierre Simpson and Colombe Demers as his grandparents in their youth, and Sean McCann and Diana Leblanc as his grandparents in older age.

The film premiered at the 2012 Toronto International Film Festival. It was a Canadian Screen Award nominee for Best Short Documentary at the 1st Canadian Screen Awards in 2013, and won the Golden Sheaf Award - Best of Festival and Best Experimental at the Yorkton Film Festival.
