= Peter Behrens (writer) =

Canadian-American screenwriter and novelist (born 1954)

- Born: October 7, 1954 (age 71); Montreal, Quebec
- Occupations: Novelist, short stories
- Writing career
- Notable work: The Law of Dreams

Peter Behrens (born 1954) is a Canadian-American novelist, screenwriter and short story writer. His debut novel, The Law of Dreams, won the 2006 Governor General's Award for English fiction, and was shortlisted for the Rogers Writers' Trust Fiction Prize, the Commonwealth Writers' Prize, the CBA Libris Award for Fiction Book of the Year, and the Amazon.ca First Novel Award.

== Profile ==
Behrens was born and raised in Montreal, Quebec, where he studied at Lower Canada College, Concordia University and McGill University. He was a Fellow of the Fine Arts Work Center in Provincetown, Massachusetts, and held a Stegner Fellowship at Stanford University. His earliest short fiction can be found in Best Canadian Stories 1978 and Best Canadian Stories 1979, and in his debut short story collection, Night Driving (1987). He subsequently worked in Hollywood as a screenwriter; though he continued to publish short stories and essays in Canadian and American magazines, he did not publish another book until The Law of Dreams, his novel of a young man driven into exile during Ireland's Great Famine. The novel was rejected by 25 publishers in the United States before being accepted by Steerforth Press. The Law of Dreams was published by House of Anansi in Canada and was published in nine languages around the world, with the US trade paperback edition published by Random House

He followed up with the novels The O'Briens (2011) and Carry Me (2016). While researching Carry Me, Behrens held a fellowship at the Netherlands Institute for Advanced Study (NIAS). Carry Me won the 2017 Vine Award for Canadian Jewish Literature.

Behrens was a 2015–16 fellow of Harvard University's Radcliffe Institute for Advanced Study. In fall 2017 he was the Mordecai Richer Writer in Residence at his alma mater, Concordia University (Montreal). In 2013 Behrens was Distinguished Visiting Writer at Wichita State University. He is an adjunct professor at Queen's University of Charlotte where he teaches in the MFA Creative Writing Program. Behrens has guest-lectured at UCLA School of Theater, Film and Television and Concordia University's School of Cinema, and taught screenwriting at Simon Fraser University's Praxis Screenwriters' Workshop.

Behrens began his screenwriting career working in collaboration with the producer Jerome Hellman. Behrens has several film and television credits as writer and story consultant. He is a member of the Writers Guild of America (West) and the Writers Guild of Canada. He has guest-lectured at UCLA School of Theater, Film and Television and taught at Simon Fraser University (Vancouver), the University of Southern Maine, Colorado College, and Wichita State University.

His essays and reviews have appeared in the New York Times, Washington Post, Wall Street Journal, The Globe and Mail, The Walrus, and The Atlantic and been broadcast on National Public Radio's All Things Considered.

== Bibliography ==
=== Novels ===
- The Law of Dreams (2006) – House of Anansi Press (Canada); Steerforth Press/Random House (US)
- The O'Briens (2011) – House of Anansi (Canada); Pantheon Books (US)
- Carry Me (2016) – House of Anansi (Canada); Pantheon Books (US)

=== Short stories ===
- Night Driving: Stories (1987) – Macmillan of Canada
- Travelling Light (2013) – Astoria

=== Screenplays ===
- Cadillac Girls - 1993
- Kayla - 1998
- In God's Country - 2007
