= The Middle Passage (film) =

1999 docudrama

- French: Passage du milieu
- Directed by: Guy Deslauriers
- Screenplay by: Patrick Chamoiseau
- Story by: Claude Chonville
- Produced by: Yasmina Ho-You-Fat
- Starring: Maka Kotto
- Cinematography: Jacques Boumendil
- Edited by: Aïlo Auguste
- Music by: Amos Coulanges
- Distributed by: Les films du Raffia
- Release dates: September 9, 2000 (Toronto International Film Festival); February 14, 2001
- Running time: 85 minutes
- Countries: Martinique, Senegal, France
- Language: French

The Middle Passage (French: Passage du milieu) is a 2000 docudrama film directed by Guy Deslauriers about the trans-Atlantic voyage of black slaves from the West Coast of Africa to the Caribbean, a part of the triangular slave trade route called the Middle Passage. It portrays the transportation of slaves from Senegal to the sugar plantations of Martinique and the miserable and often fatal conditions on board the slave ship. The script is by Patrick Chamoiseau based on a scenario by Claude Chonville. It was a Martinique-Senegal-France co-production and was screened at the 2000 Toronto International Film Festival.

The film has no dialogue, only a voice-over, spoken by Maka Kotto. Visually, it presents disconnected, slow-motion views of the slaves to evoke both their suffering and the resistance it produced, the source of the blues and of West Indian identity. When it was generally released in February 2001, the reviewer for La Libération said that it successfully occupied a territory "somewhere between the fiction of phantoms and the documentary of fantasies". The reviewer for Le Monde judged it "a brave but ultimately unsuccessful attempt" to fill the "[cinematic] void" on this subject.

== See also ==
- List of films featuring slavery
