= Eerie, Indiana: The Other Dimension =

American tv-series

- Genre: Horror; Mystery
- Written by: Jim Henshaw; Terry Saltsman
- Directed by: John Bell; René Bonnière
- Starring: Bill Switzer; Daniel Clark
- Composer: The Einstein Bros.
- Countries of origin: Canada; United States
- Original language: English
- No. of seasons: 1
- No. of episodes: 15

Production
- Executive producer: Julian Marks
- Production locations: Toronto, Ontario, Canada
- Running time: 30 minutes (with commercials)
- Production companies: Power Pictures; Hearst Entertainment

Original release
- Network: Fox Kids
- Release: February 7 – May 30, 1998

Related
- Eerie, Indiana

Eerie, Indiana: The Other Dimension is an American horror science-fiction television series. It is a spin-off of Eerie, Indiana. The series stars Bill Switzer and Daniel Clark as the main protagonists. It aired on the Fox Kids Network in 1998.

== Plot ==
The series revolves around best friends Mitchell Taylor and Stanley Hope. Like earlier Eerie, Indiana residents Marshall Teller and Simon Holmes, they are constantly encountering strange and out-of-this-world phenomena in their hometown of Eerie, Indiana, depicted as the "weirdest place on Earth."

Weird things happen but only Mitchell and Stanley seem to notice, and in an effort to prove to people what they have known for a while now, Mitchell and Stanley begin collecting evidence of the strange phenomena they encounter.

I do solemnly swear that everything I am about to tell you is true. A spill of weirdness from another dimension turned my hometown into the center of weirdness for the entire universe. You don't believe me! Just watch.

— Mitchell Taylor

== Cast ==
- Bill Switzer as Mitchell Taylor
- Daniel Clark as Stanley Hope
- Deborah Odell as Mrs. Taylor
- Lindy Booth as Carrie Taylor
- Bruce Hunter as Edward Taylor
- Neil Crone as Mr. Crawford

== Development ==
In 1997, the earlier show Eerie, Indiana, generated a new fan base when Fox's children's programming block Fox Kids aired the series, gaining something of a cult following despite its short run. The renewed popularity of the series encouraged Fox to produce this spin-off.

Rick Karo from Hearst Entertainment, one of the production companies behind the show, opined that Eerie Indiana "is one of the great Cinderella stories in television; it has gone from almost working in prime time over five years ago to a hit series on Saturday mornings." The series was shot on location in Canada, with Toronto standing in for the town of Eerie.

== Episodes ==
No.	Title	Original release date
1	"Switching Channels"	February 7, 1998
Mitchell Taylor and his best friend, Stanley live in Eerie, Indiana, the most normal place on Earth. However, the town soon begins to live up to its name when two similar-looking boys (Marshall and Simon from the original series) begin communicating with them through the Taylor's new satellite TV installation, which is actually a mad cable installer's attempt at opening portals to strange, new dimensions whose residents begin appearing in Eerie.
2	"The Goody-Two Shoes People"	February 14, 1998
Mitchell and Stanley join Eerie's "Junior Executives Club" in order to fund their research on the weird, unexplained phenomena in their town...and learn that their teacher, Mr. Stepford, is abducting the members and turning them into robot clones so parents can finally have perfect kids.
3	"Standard Deviation"	February 21, 1998
A woman from the Mad Bureau of Statistics cites Mitchell's family for not being "normal" and fixes to make them and Eerie, Indiana the most normal family and town in America...unless Mitchell and Stanley can reunite her with her Latino lover/tango partner who was abducted by aliens years ago.
4	"Time Flies"	February 28, 1998
Mr. Tempis, a slick-talking salesman (Tony Rosato) and his scientist partner, Mr. Fugit, sell Mr. Crawford a coffee machine that causes time in Eerie to speed up...and Mr. Tempis to steal the unused time and sell it to others.
5	"The Phantom"	March 7, 1998
Mitchell and Stanley go ghost-hunting for a school phantom, only to discover that the "phantom" is actually a boy named Oliver whose lack of self-confidence is turning him invisible and if Mitchell and Stanley can't create a bold, new personality for Oliver, he'll end up in a dimension for lost and forgotten things.
6	"The Young And The Twitchy"	March 14, 1998
When dashing soap opera star, Stag Carnalli, visits Eerie and stays with Mitchell's family, his presence turns all life in Eerie into a torrid daytime drama, filled with love triangles, improbable plot twists, and bad organ music. Can Mitchell save his family before he gets caught up in the drama?
7	"Last Laugh"	March 21, 1998
Howie "The Lip" Lippman, a gag-writing genius, helps Stanley become a master insult comic to get back at Eerie's local bully group, The Bad Apples, but Mitchell discovers that Stanley's comic mentor has cursed anyone who studies with him into going insane from being addicted to laughs and adulation, and the only way to save Stanley's mind is to get Bob the Janitor (who used to be a comedian named Freddie "The Headcase" Foster) out of retirement.
8	"The Newsroom"	April 4, 1998
Mitchell and Stanley go down to Eerie's local newspaper office to complain about false advertisement when they receive a tin-can telephone in the mail, and discover that the editor created a typewriter that makes bad news come true...including news of an impending nuclear plant disaster.
9	"Little Buddy Beep Beep"	April 11, 1998
Eerie's kids become obsessed with a new Tamagotchi-style electronic toy where those who take the best care of it win a golden version of the toy...and Mitchell (after accidentally winning the prize while taking care of Stanley's toy) discovers why the winners are never seen again after they go to collect their prize.
10	"Perfect"	April 18, 1998
Dolly Smith, a former beauty queen and current makeup saleswoman, recruits Mitchell's sister, Carrie, into being the new face of her cosmetics line and day spa, and Mitchell and Stanley must rescue Carrie from losing her emotions, her brains, and her freedom when the beauty regimen calls for more permanent solutions.
11	"Nightmare On Eerie Street"	April 25, 1998
The legendary Sandman (depicted as a late-night radio DJ) can't sleep, so he decides to keep all of Eerie awake with nightmares.
12	"Mr. Lucky"	May 2, 1998
Mitchell gains continuous good luck after breaking a wishbone with an Irish man at the World O'Stuff, but when the winning streak causes his family to hate him, Mitchell sues the stranger who cursed him.
13	"Send In The Clones"	May 9, 1998
Thanks to a science project mishap involving plant food and an appendix in a jar, Mitchell accidentally creates a hippie kid who turns out to be his father, Eddie, as a 13-year-old.
14	"I'm Okay, You're Really Weird"	May 16, 1998
Eerie's resident psychotherapist, Ziggy Lloyd, is turning all of Eerie's adults into immature, impulsive goofballs with his latest book and aromatherapy sessions, and the only way to stop Eerie from becoming more of a circus sideshow than it already is, is to find Ziggy's mother.
15	"The Jackalope"	May 30, 1998
Mitchell and Stanley fight to protect a mythical animal from being hunted to extinction by a ruthless poacher.

== Reception ==
Alex Strachan from The Vancouver Sun wrote that "judging from the first episode of The Other Dimension, the new producers have rung in the new with much of the old; the story, about an otherworldly satellite dish that literally hypnotizes viewers with its 2,000-channel television universe, is zany and charming at the same time; Switzer has a low-key, sweet naturalness to him, and the writing can be tart and clever; it's always hard to judge from one episode, but if the series follows through on its early promise, it will provide a welcome alternative to the junk that passes as Saturday-morning kids' TV."

Common Sense Media stated "though it lacks some of its predecessor's pizzazz, The Other Dimension is still an entertaining blend of comedy and mock horror that's nicely suited for families; while there are some surprises and potentially worrisome concepts like ghosts and brainwashing, most kids will recognize the satire that keeps it from being truly scary."

Stephen Harber from Den of Geek wrote the series is "neither a remake or a reboot, the show was more of a spinoff; and because the two new main characters were supposed to be versions of Marshall and Simon, the new lead actors were dressed to resemble Marshall and Simon as much as possible without actually being them; although this show gave Eerie a new lease on life, it promptly disappeared after its initial run on Fox Kids in 1998 and has since become more of a TV urban legend."

John Allemang from The Globe and Mail observed that "this Canadian-made show is kid's sci-fi played for laughs, and it works surprising well; parents who look in will appreciate the witty swipes at so-called normality — a statistics department inspector, for example, who is deeply troubled that Eerie's most average family doesn't own the correct proportion of generic cereals."
