= Michael Riley =

Canadian actor (born 1962)

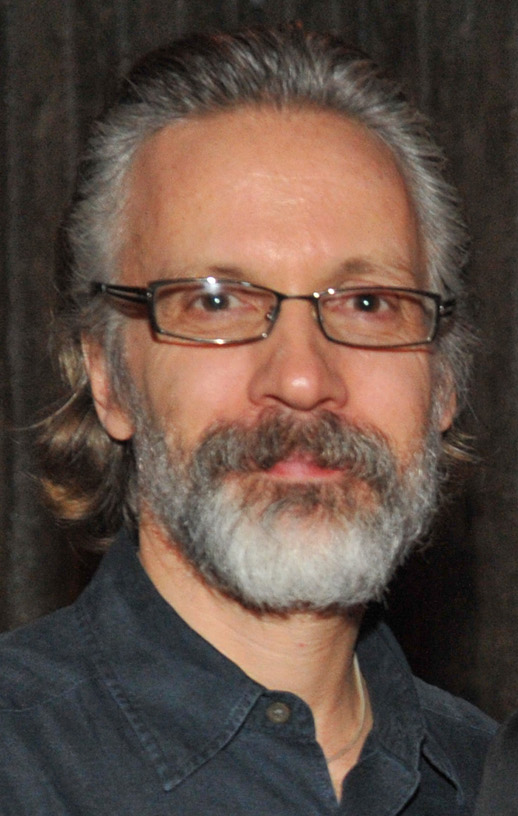
- Riley in June 2012
- Born: February 4, 1962 (age 64); London, Ontario, Canada
- Occupation: Actor
- Years active: 1985–present
- Spouse: Laura Riley (m. 1994)

Michael Riley (born February 4, 1962) is a Canadian actor.

From 1998 to 2000, he portrayed Brett Parker in Power Play. Riley has appeared in more than 40 films and television productions, including This Is Wonderland, for which he received a Gemini Award, and the Emmy-nominated BBC / Discovery Channel co-production Supervolcano. He is also known for his role as Dr. Tom in the CBC Television series Being Erica (2009–2011).

== Biography ==
Riley was born in London, Ontario, and graduated from the National Theatre School of Canada in Montreal, Quebec in 1984.

As a stage actor, Riley received a Dora Mavor Moore Award nomination for his performance as Arkady in George F. Walker’s Nothing Sacred (1988). He appeared in the miniseries Race to Mars and the series St. Urbain's Horseman. He starred in the CBC series This Is Wonderland, and has guest-starred for CBS on series such as CSI: Crime Scene Investigation and Flashpoint.

Riley has earned five Gemini Awards and an additional six Best Actor Gemini nominations, among other industry accolades. His more recent film appearances include Normal (directed by Carl Bessai) and Mr. Nobody (directed by Jaco Van Dormael). He has also provided the voice for the title character in the animated series Ace Lightning.

== Filmography ==
=== Film ===
Year	Title	Role	Notes
1987	No Man's Land	Horton	
1989	The Private Capital	—	
1991	Diplomatic Immunity	Les Oberfell	
1991	Perfectly Normal	Renzo Parachi	
1992	To Catch a Killer	Lt. Joseph "Joe/Polock" Kozenczak	
1993	Because Why	Alex	
1993	Lifeline to Victory	Paul Devereaux	
1993	Mustard Bath	Matthew Linden	
1993	The Making of '...And God Spoke'	Clive Walton	
1994	Race to Freedom: The Underground Railroad	Boss	
1995	Butterbox Babies	Russell Cameron	
1995	French Kiss	M. Campbell	
1995	Strauss: The King of 3/4 Time	Johann Strauss Jr.	
1995	The Possession of Michael D.	Dr. Nick Galler	
1996	Heck's Way Home	Rick Neufeld	
1996	The Grace of God	Chip	
1996	The Prince	Roy Timmons	
1996	Voice from the Grave	Adam Schuster	
1997	Amistad	British Officer	
1997	Every 9 Seconds	Ray	
1997	Pale Saints	Dody	
1998	Heart of the Sun	Father Ed	
1998	Ice 19	—	
2004	Supervolcano	Rick Lieberman	
2004	Cube Zero	Jax	
2020	Like a House on Fire	Jack	Co-starring Sarah Sutherland

=== Television ===
Year	Title	Role	Notes
1985	The Edison Twins	Winston / Gregory	2 episodes
1988	Chasing Rainbows	Christopher Blaine	
1993	Street Legal	Adam Ruskin	2 episodes
1995	Due South	Walter Sparks	1 episode
1998–2000	Power Play	Brett Parker	26 episodes
1999–2000	The Outer Limits	Gerard / Jon Tarkman	2 episodes
2001	The Way We Live Now	Hamilton K. Fisker	3 episodes
2003	CSI: Crime Scene Investigation	—	"Lady Heather's Box" (1 episode)
2004–2006	This Is Wonderland	Elliot Sacks	39 episodes
2009	Flashpoint	Pat Cosgrove	1 episode
2009–2011	Being Erica	Dr. Tom	Main role
2012	Willed to Kill	Dr. Aaron Kade	TV movie
2018	Insomnia	Dr. Engels	1 episode
2022–2024	Transplant	William Hunter	3 episodes
2023	Ruby and the Well	Thomas Angus "Tom" O'Reilly	1 episode
2025	Doc	Grant	1 episode
