= Jeffrey St. Jules =

Canadian film director and screenwriter

- Born: Fall River, Nova Scotia, Canada
- Occupations: Film director, screenwriter
- Years active: 2000s-present
- Known for: Bang Bang Baby

Jeffrey St. Jules is a Canadian film director and screenwriter, who won the Claude Jutra Award in 2015 for his debut feature film Bang Bang Baby. The film also won the award for Best Canadian First Feature Film at the 2014 Toronto International Film Festival.

== Career ==
Originally from Fall River, Nova Scotia, St. Jules studied creative writing and film at Concordia University. Prior to making Bang Bang Baby, St. Jules wrote and directed a number of short films, including The Sadness of Johnson Joe Jangles, The Tragic Story of Nling, The Long Autumn, Let the Daylight Into the Swamp and a music video for Apostle of Hustle's "National Anthem of Nowhere".

He won the Jackson-Triggs Award for Best Emerging Canadian Filmmaker at the CFC Worldwide Short Film Festival in 2005 for Joe Jangles, and in the same year became the first Canadian film director ever admitted to the Cannes Film Festival's residency program for emerging filmmakers. The Tragic Story of Nling was a Genie Award nominee for Best Live Action Short Drama at the 28th Genie Awards. Let the Daylight into the Swamp, an experimental documentary film about his grandparents, was a shortlisted nominee for Best Short Documentary at the 1st Canadian Screen Awards.

His second full-length feature film, Cinema of Sleep, was released in 2021. St. Jules received a nomination for the Directors Guild of Canada's DGC Award for Best Direction in a Feature Film.

== Filmography ==
- The Sadness of Johnson Joe Jangles - 2004
- The Tragic Story of Nling - 2006
- Let the Daylight Into the Swamp - 2012
- Bang Bang Baby - 2014
- The Rarebit Fiend - 2015
- Cinema of Sleep - 2021
- The Silent Planet - 2024
