= Toronto Film Critics Association Awards 2001 =

Annual Canadian film awards ceremony

5th TFCA Awards

December 20, 2001

Best Film:
Memento

The 5th Toronto Film Critics Association Awards, honoring the best in film for 2001, were held on 20 December 2001.

== Winners ==
- Best Actor:
  - Ed Harris – Pollock

Runners-Up: John Cameron Mitchell – Hedwig and the Angry Inch and Jack Nicholson – The Pledge

- Best Actress:
  - Thora Birch – Ghost World

Runners-Up: Gillian Anderson – The House of Mirth and Tilda Swinton – The Deep End

- Best Canadian Film:
  - Last Wedding

Runners-Up: Ginger Snaps and The Uncles

- Best Director:
  - David Lynch – Mulholland Dr.

Runners-Up: Jean-Pierre Jeunet – Amélie and Peter Jackson – The Lord of the Rings: The Fellowship of the Ring

- Best Film:
  - Memento

Runners-Up: Amélie and Mulholland Dr.

- Best First Feature:
  - Sexy Beast

Runners-Up: Amores Perros and In the Bedroom

- Best Screenplay:
  - Memento – Christopher Nolan

Runners-Up: Ghost World – Terry Zwigoff and Daniel Clowes and The Royal Tenenbaums – Wes Anderson and Owen Wilson

- Best Supporting Actor:
  - Ben Kingsley – Sexy Beast

Runners-Up: Steve Buscemi – Ghost World and Ian McKellen – The Lord of the Rings: The Fellowship of the Ring

- Best Supporting Actress:
  - Scarlett Johansson – Ghost World

Runners-Up: Laura Linney – The House of Mirth and Gwyneth Paltrow – The Royal Tenenbaums

- Clyde Gilmour Award:
  - James Quandt
