= The Silent Planet =

- Film poster
- Directed by: Jeffrey St. Jules
- Written by: Jeffrey St. Jules
- Produced by: Andrew Bronfman; Mark O'Neill
- Starring: Elias Koteas; Briana Middleton
- Cinematography: Paul Sarossy
- Edited by: Tiffany Beaudin; Jeffrey St. Jules
- Music by: Darren Fung
- Production companies: Good Movies; JoBro Productions; Panoramic Pictures; Vigilante Productions
- Distributed by: Quiver Distribution
- Release date: July 24, 2024 (Fantasia)
- Running time: 95 minutes
- Country: Canada
- Language: English

The Silent Planet (full on-screen title: The Silent Planet or The Sad Dreams of Earthlings) is a Canadian science fiction film, directed by Jeffrey St. Jules and released in 2024.

== Plot ==
The film opens with a quotation from the Oiean Book of Escape: “… and they ascended into that silence at the very top of the world / where all they could hear was their self.” In the future, Earth has become partially occupied by a pacifistic migrant extraterrestrial species, the Oieans; despite their innocuous nature, their growing numbers cause global social unrest among humans, who engage in conflicts against them. At this time, humans charged with the crimes of murder, terrorism or treason may be sent to uninhabited planets to serve life imprisonment completely alone there.

An aging man (Elias Koteas) who has long been isolated as the sole prisoner in a penal colony on Solitary Penal Planet #384, where he spends his days forced to mine an alien ore with glowing veins, which is sent to an orbiting satellite. Having no means to communicate with anyone and fighting to remain sane, he reminisces about his life on Earth in his free time and recalls his wife Mona, writing letters that will never reach her and watching AI-generated sitcoms on a V8, his personal AI TV device. He strongly fears when a purple alien gas approaches, since it induces and augments negative thoughts and he suspects it has some sentience. When his life monitor implant warns him that he is terminally ill and he removes it, this prompts another prisoner to be sent.

He initially suspects the new prisoner (Briana Middleton) has been sent to kill him, and sneaks into her habitat ship while she's supposedly asleep and takes her journal. After some confrontation, Theodore and later Niyya introduce themselves to each other and eventually start working together in the mines. Later on, he invites her to have dinner at his place; they talk and share some of their life stories (Niyya came from City 12 in upper North America and was raised by Oieans in the Black Sea) and even drink whisky and smoke some medicinal cannabis he had brought. They reveal their crimes to each other: Theodore says he was framed for murder, while Niyya explains she was charged with terrorism, as she tried to assassinate the prime minister; Theodore also adds he's unsure to what extent he can recollect his memories correctly. At the end of their encounter, he says he's pretty sure his actual name was Nathan Flanagan – the name of the military officer who shot the Oieans who raised Niyya and she considered her family.

Under the negative influence of the purple alien gas, Niyya grows increasingly suspicious of Theodore and starts to blame him for the murdering of her Oiean family. She hides from him in the old habitat ship of an unnamed third prisoner (who was exiled there prior to both of them and eventually hanged himself), and then hits him with a shovel. Theodore finally remembers it was he who killed his wife Mona, seeing himself stabbing her with his knife, and cries; Niyya leaves him. Meanwhile, the derelict habitat ship is shown to feature dreadful pictures graffitied in blood covering the walls, with distorted human bodies and faces in intense pain and the words "Filth! They all deserved to die!" – indicating the unnamed third prisoner's very negative thoughts got mixtured up with Theodore's and Niyya's as they were being affected by the gas.

Retreating to her own habitat ship, Niyya rereads her journal, written mostly in Oiean script but with some occasional English, which includes the name "Nathan Flanagan". At that moment, the gas temporarily engulfs her ship and she feels overwhelmed by negative thoughts that she realizes are not her own; she cries. She goes back to Theodore and asks him if he thought his name was "Nathan Flanagan" because he read it in her journal, and he concedes it could be so. He then offers to have her life monitor implant removed and inserted on him instead, so that once he finally dies from his injuries and poor health, she will be considered dead and thus freed from working in the mines.

Shortly after, Theodore passes away; Niyya covers his body with a blanket and closes his habitat ship, leaving it. She then heads for the top of a small nearby mountain, where she sits and stares into the horizon.

== Cast ==
- Elias Koteas as Theodore "Theo", a lone elderly man serving a life sentence on Solitary Penal Planet #384
  - Justin Nurse as young Theodore
- Briana Middleton as Niyya, a young woman serving a life sentence on that same prison-planet
  - Chelsea Gould as young Niyya
- Courtney Ch'ng Lancaster as Mona, Theodore's wife back on Earth (in flashbacks and visions)
- Alex Paxton-Beesley as the voice of Janie, Niyya's unhelpful local AI companion
- Bridget Wareham as Alana, a woman mentioned in Niyya's diary, seeming to be her ally, friend, and/or girlfriend (in flashbacks)
- Rhiannon Morgan as Niyya's human mother (in flashbacks)
- Reuben Fredrick Gear as Theo, a fictional character in Theodore's AI TV named and modeled after his younger self, and as Mona's lover (in visions)
- Mark Power as Corporal Nathan Flanagan, the military officer who had killed Niyya's Oiean family (in flashbacks)

Catherine Fitch, Jonathan Watton, Bob Jet, and Lisa Norton are credited as "loop group performers" (possibly as part of the collective of voices in the purple alien gas).

== Production ==
The film was shot in Newfoundland and Labrador, Canada, in 2023. Filming took place in Gros Morne National Park, which features grassy knolls and mountains.

== Release ==
It premiered at the 28th Fantasia International Film Festival, where it was first runner-up for the Audience Award for Best Canadian Feature.

== Accolades ==
The Silent Planet received nominations at the 2024 Directors Guild of Canada (DGC) Craft Awards.

Awards and nominations for The Silent Planet
Year	Award	Category	Recipient(s)	Result
2024	DGC Craft Award	Outstanding Achievement in Production Design – Feature Film (Limited Budget)	Andrew Berry	Nominated
2024	DGC Craft Award	Outstanding Achievement in Sound Editing – Feature Film	Jeremy Laing, Bryson Cassidy	Nominated
