= Saint Jude (film) =

2000 film by John L'Ecuyer

- Directed by: John L'Ecuyer
- Written by: Heather O'Neill; Esta Spalding
- Produced by: Nicole Robert; Sandra Cunningham
- Starring: Liane Balaban; Nicholas Campbell; Kris Lemche
- Cinematography: Stephen Reizes
- Edited by: Nick Hector
- Music by: Mark Korven
- Production companies: Lux Films; East Side Film Company
- Distributed by: Behaviour Distribution; Seville Films
- Release date: September 14, 2000 (TIFF)
- Running time: 90 minutes
- Country: Canada
- Languages: English; French

Saint Jude is a 2000 Canadian drama film directed by John L'Ecuyer. The film stars Liane Balaban as Jude, a teenage girl from a dysfunctional family who hangs out on the streets of Montreal as a prostitute and drug addict.

The cast includes Nicholas Campbell as Jude's father, Victoria Sanchez as her sister Maureen, Kris Lemche as Maureen's HIV+ drug addict boyfriend Gabe and Bernie Coulson as Big Al, as well as Raymond Cloutier, Louise Portal, Victor Soumis, Simon Peacock, Tom Watt, Daniela Akerblom, Robert Morin, David DiSalvio, Arizona O'Neill, Mary Morter, Gerald L'Ecuyer, Griffith Brewer and Sasha Dominique in supporting roles.

The screenplay was written by Heather O'Neill and Esta Spalding, based in part on O'Neill's short story "Big Al". It was shot in Montreal in spring 1999.

The film premiered in the Perspective Canada program at the 2000 Toronto International Film Festival.

== Cast ==
- Liane Balaban as Jude
- Nicholas Campbell as Dad
- Raymond Cloutier as Clarence
- Bernie Coulson as Al "Big Al"
- Kris Lemche as Gabe
- Louise Portal as Georgie's Mother
- Victoria Sanchez as Maureen
- Victor Soumis as Georgie
- Simon Peacock as Lenny
- Tom Watt as Pat
- Robert Morin as Drug Dealer
- David DiSalvo as Jude's Trick
- Mary Morter as Clarence's Mother
- Gerald L'Ecuyer as "Bibi"
- Swede Swensson as "Mink"

== Critical response ==
Liam Lacey of The Globe and Mail analyzed L'Ecuyer's choice to cast Balaban, in only her second film role following the wholesome coming-of-age drama New Waterford Girl just one year earlier, writing that "there are a couple of needless fashion-shoot closeups of her mouth and eyes, but mostly, the choice of the glamorous-looking teenager is not just about casting pretty, but casting counterintuitively. Most actresses in Hollywood have donned the miniskirt and push-up bra to play street sexy. It's a more complex idea to suggest that someone who's good-looking and bright might find the street life temptingly easy."

For the Toronto Star, Geoff Pevere wrote that "For all its considerable kinetic energy and dramatic charm - Balaban is appropriately charismatic, and both Coulson and Campbell leave deep impressions - Saint-Jude is a movie that never quite slips the bonds of its own conceptions. Which is to say that the script's poetic conceits never quite take occupancy of the streets they describe. "You're like Vegas," Jude tells the dissolute junkie/angel/ impatient Gabriel (Lemche). "You glow in the dark." He disagrees. "Things that glow in the dark are very selfish," he says. "They only make themselves look good." This is fine writing for the purposes of song or theatre, where verse does not fall on the ears with such clattering force. But it's pretty heavy stuff to keep aloft in the more naturalistic flow of a dramatic movie, and particularly a movie with its feet planted so firmly on the concrete."
