= Linda Svendsen =

Canadian screenwriter and author (born c. 1954)

Linda Svendsen (born Vancouver, 1954) is a Canadian screenwriter and author.

== Biography ==
She has lived in her birth city for most of her life.

Her works include many critically acclaimed short stories. Her stories were anthologized and published in magazines such as Atlantic Monthly and Saturday Night. She won first prize in the American Short Story Contest in 1980, and was a three-time finalist for the O. Henry Awards.

In 1992, she published a book called Marine Life, which was also translated into German which was a finalist for the 1993 Ethel Wilson Fiction Prize. In 2000, Marine Life was adapted into a film starring Cybill Shepherd and Peter Outerbridge.

Svendsen wrote the television film adaptation of The Diviners, as well as the miniseries Human Cargo and the television film At the End of the Day: The Sue Rodriguez Story. She won a Gemini Award for the Human Cargo screenplay. She also teaches creative writing at the University of British Columbia.
