= Daniela Akerblom =

Canadian actress

- Born: 1969 (age 56–57); Montreal, Quebec
- Citizenship: Canadian
- Education: Trafalgar School for Girls, 1986; Vanier, 1988; Concordia University, 1990
- Occupations: film, television, and stage actress collage artist
- Partner: John L'Ecuyer

Daniela Akerblom (born 1969) is a Canadian actress who has appeared on television, in films, and on stage. She was born in Montreal, Quebec, and studied at Concordia University. She also works as a collage artist. She speaks three languages fluently.

== Early life ==
Akerblom attended Trafalgar School for Girls, graduating in 1986. Of her time at the school, she stated that she learned how to put faith in herself and her abilities. She was listed as attending the CEGEP at Vanier in 1986.

== Acting career ==
After attending Concordia University from 1988 - 1990, Akerblom traveled to Paris. In 1991, Trafalgar reported that she was working in French film and television.

She spent several years there before returning to Montreal after being chosen by the students of Trafalgar to speak on 17 November 1994. At the time, she worked for Agence Artistique Pleiades both on screen and as a voice actress.

She has been a member of the Union des Artistes as a stage actor since at least 1987.

== Filmography ==
- 1986: Sword of Gideon: Girl
- 1986: He Shoots, He Scores (Lance et compte) : Geneviève
- 1987: La Maison Deschênes [fr]: Élise Laurin
- 1989: Cruising Bar: Monique
- 1989: Le Destin du docteur Calvet : Sandy Leclerc
- 1991: Salut les musclés
- 1991: Sous le signe du poisson: Olsa
- 1992: Primary Motive: Announcer
- 1995: Vanished: Brigitte Saunders
- 1997: Snowboard Academy : Jessica
- 1997: An American Affair : Phyllis
- 1997: Omertà II - La loi du silence : Lyne Levert
- 1999: Kayla: Miss Washburn
- 1999: Babel : Receptionist
- 2000: Saint Jude : Drunk Girl in Club
- 22 February 2000: Les Prédateurs, episode: "Double": Danielle
- 2001: km/h : Femme allemande
- 2004: On the Verge of a Fever (Le Goût des jeunes filles): reporter
- 2010: Mirador : Femme de Ralf

== Stage performances ==
June – August 1997: Flight of the Bumblebee at the Théâtre Saint-Saveur

== Non-performance artwork ==
Akerblom has also created collages that have been featured in See Magazine (August 1996) as well as at the Reel Film Festival (November 2001). Several of her works were featured in a profile article in Kolaj (November 2017).

== Personal life ==
In 2009, she was listed as the life partner of John L'Ecuyer in the Canadian Who's Who.
