= The Tragic Story of Nling =

- Directed by: Jeffrey St. Jules
- Written by: Jeffrey St. Jules
- Produced by: Larissa Giroux
- Starring: Tom Barnett; John Neville; Steven McCarthy
- Cinematography: D. Gregor Hagey
- Edited by: Randy Zimmer
- Music by: Darren Fung
- Production company: Intrepid Film Arts
- Release date: September 2006 (TIFF)
- Running time: 14 minutes
- Country: Canada

The Tragic Story of Nling is a Canadian short film, directed by Jeffrey St. Jules and released in 2006. The film is set in a fictional city called Capillia, which disposed of its poor citizens by isolating them in a walled compound called Nling, and tells the story of a man (Tom Barnett) and a donkey (voiced by John Neville), who attempt to escape from Nling after becoming its last surviving residents.

St. Jules made the film by shooting live footage, then printing the film out on paper and scanning it to create a jittery animation-like effect.

The film premiered at the 2006 Toronto International Film Festival.

The film was a Canadian Screen Award nominee for Best Live Action Short Drama at the 28th Genie Awards.
