= Cinema of Sleep =

2021 Canadian psychological thriller film

- Directed by: Jeffrey St. Jules
- Written by: Jeffrey St. Jules
- Produced by: Sami Tesfazghi; Ian Dimerman; Brendon Sawatzky
- Starring: Dayo Ade; Getenesh Berhe; Jonas Chernick
- Cinematography: Jordan Oram
- Edited by: Dev Singh
- Music by: Darren Fung
- Production company: Inferno Pictures
- Release date: April 1, 2021 (SBIFF)
- Running time: 105 minutes
- Country: Canada
- Language: English

Cinema of Sleep is a 2021 Canadian psychological thriller film, directed by Jeffrey St. Jules. The film stars Dayo Ade as Anthony, a Nigerian refugee staying in a motel room while he waits for his asylum claim to be processed, who wakes up from a strange dream in which he is watching a film of himself being arrested for murdering a woman, only to find the woman from his dream (Getenesh Berhe) actually dead in bed next to him.

The cast also includes Jonas Chernick as Frank, the occupant of the neighbouring motel room, David Lawrence Brown as Detective Smith, and Oluniké Adeliyi as Omoni.

The film entered production in Winnipeg, Manitoba, in 2019. In addition to being set against the backdrop of contemporary political issues around immigration, the film also incorporates a number of allusions to classic films.

The film premiered at the Santa Barbara International Film Festival on April 1, 2021. The film was subsequently screened in the Borsos Competition program at the 2021 Whistler Film Festival, where it won the award for Best Canadian Film and Ade won the award for Best Performance in a Canadian Film.

St. Jules received a nomination for the Directors Guild of Canada's DGC Award for Best Direction in a Feature Film.

The film received two Canadian Screen Award nominations at the 10th Canadian Screen Awards in 2022, for Best Editing (Dev Singh) and Best Original Score (Darren Fung).
