= Three Stories from the End of Everything =

2000 Canadian short film

- Directed by: Semi Chellas
- Written by: Semi Chellas; Judith Wambera
- Produced by: John Buchan
- Starring: Soo Garay; John Robinson; Lucas Denton; Kristen Ross
- Cinematography: Steve Cosens
- Edited by: David Wharnsby
- Music by: Ron Sures
- Release date: September 9, 2000 (TIFF)
- Running time: 19 minutes
- Country: Canada
- Language: English

Three Stories from the End of Everything is a Canadian short drama film, directed by Semi Chellas and released in 2000. The film centres on three characters who are coping with unrequited or lost love.

Its cast included Soo Garay, John Robinson, Lucas Denton and Kristen Ross.

The film premiered on September 9, 2000, at the 2000 Toronto International Film Festival.

It received a Genie Award nomination for Best Live Action Short Drama at the 22nd Genie Awards in 2002. In advance of the Genie Award ceremony on February 7, it was screened at the Bloor Cinema on January 27, as the opening film to a screening of Treed Murray.
