= Flower & Garnet =

- Directed by: Keith Behrman
- Written by: Keith Behrman
- Produced by: Trish Dolman
- Starring: Callum Keith Rennie; Jane McGregor; Colin Roberts; Dov Tiefenbach
- Cinematography: Steve Cosens
- Edited by: Michael John Bateman
- Music by: Peter Allen
- Release date: 26 August 2002 (Montréal Film Festival)
- Running time: 103 minutes
- Country: Canada
- Language: English

Flower & Garnet is a Canadian drama film, written and directed by Keith Behrman and released in 2002.

== Plot ==
A father finds difficulties in expressing his love to his children. Garnet (played by Colin Roberts) and Flower (Jane McGregor) have grown up in an environment of stifled grief. Since their mother died, Ed (Callum Keith Rennie), their father, mostly just lives without a goal. Eight-year-old Garnet struggles to comprehend the world around him, while sixteen-year-old Flower seeks love with her new boyfriend. Forced to become a real parent to Garnet, Ed buys Garnet a gun and shows, for the first time, his real affection for the boy.

== Awards ==
Behrman won the Claude Jutra Award for the best feature film by a first-time film director at the 23rd Genie Awards. The film was named to the Toronto International Film Festival's annual year-end Canada's Top Ten list for 2002, and won the Vancouver Film Critics Circle Award for Best Canadian Film.

At the 2002 Whistler Film Festival, the film won the Audience Award.

Roberts received a Genie Award nomination for Best Actor, while Rennie won the Vancouver Film Critics Circle Award for Best Actor in a Canadian Film.

Composer Peter Allen won a Leo Award for his film score in 2003.
