= The Grace of God =

- Directed by: Gerald L'Ecuyer
- Produced by: Stacey Donen; Susan Sultan
- Starring: Michael Riley; Steve Cumyn; David Cronenberg
- Cinematography: Jonathan Freeman
- Edited by: Anna Pafomow
- Music by: Christopher J. Byrne
- Production companies: Dexter Film Company; Psychosomatic Productions
- Release date: 1998
- Running time: 92 minutes
- Country: Canada
- Language: English

The Grace of God is a Canadian docudrama film, directed by Gerald L'Ecuyer and released in 1998. Centering on L'Ecuyer's identity as a gay man, the film unfolds as a series of vignettes depicting various key moments in his life, acted by a cast that includes Michael Riley, Steve Cumyn, Robbie Pennant, Alanna Cavanagh, David Bolt and David Cronenberg.

The film won the award for Best Canadian Film at the 1998 Inside Out Film and Video Festival.
