= The Sadness of Johnson Joe Jangles =

- Directed by: Jeffrey St. Jules
- Written by: Jeffrey St. Jules
- Produced by: Andy Marshall
- Starring: Zachary Bennett; Gregory White; Soo Garay
- Cinematography: Jonathan Bensimon
- Edited by: Randy Zimmer
- Music by: Darren Fung
- Production company: Canadian Film Centre
- Distributed by: Flow Distribution
- Release date: June 7, 2004
- Running time: 19 minutes
- Country: Canada
- Language: English

The Sadness of Johnson Joe Jangles is a Canadian experimental short drama film, directed by Jeffrey St. Jules and released in 2004. The film stars Zachary Bennett as the titular Johnson Joe Jangles, a gay cowboy who aspires to start a family with his husband Pete (Gregory White), only for their dreams to be tested when Clay Fantasia (Soo Garay) offers them jobs in a lawless frontier town where even the basic laws of nature don't apply.

The cast also includes Keir Gilchrist, Shayne Taylor and Cherisse Woonsam.

Made as St. Jules' student project for the Canadian Film Centre, the film incorporates both surreal fantasy and musical elements, with its visual style influenced by both Caravaggio and David LaChapelle.

The film premiered on June 7, 2004, at a screening series of short films by that year's CFC graduates. It was later screened at the 2004 Montreal World Film Festival, and the 2004 Toronto International Film Festival.

At the 2005 CFC Worldwide Short Film Festival, St. Jules won the Jackson-Triggs Award for Best Emerging Canadian Filmmaker.
