= Bang Bang Baby =

2014 Canadian musical sci-fi film

- Film poster
- Directed by: Jeffrey St. Jules
- Written by: Jeffrey St. Jules
- Produced by: Don Allan; Daniel Bekerman; Jonathan Bronfman
- Starring: Jane Levy; Justin Chatwin; Peter Stormare
- Cinematography: Bobby Shore
- Edited by: Matt Lyon
- Music by: Darren Fung
- Production companies: Telefilm Canada; Scythia Films; JoBro Productions
- Distributed by: Search Engine Films (Canada)
- Release dates: September 8, 2014 (TIFF); August 21, 2015 (Canada)
- Running time: 90 minutes
- Country: Canada
- Language: English

Bang Bang Baby is a Canadian musical science-fiction film written and directed by Jeffrey St. Jules, which premiered in 2014 at Toronto International Film Festival.

== Plot ==
Stepphy, a teenager living in the small town of Lonely Arms, dreams of becoming a famous singer. Her alcoholic father, George, refuses to let her enter a singing competition in New York City. When she is sexually assaulted by a local man, she begins having dissociative delusions that lead her to believe that her fate may change when her idol, Bobby Shore, shows up in town after his car breaks down. Meanwhile, a dangerous leak at the local chemical plant is beginning to turn the local townsfolk into mutants. Which results in a quarantine of the entire town.

Her delusions persist which leads her to believe that her body is mutating when she falls pregnant with her assailant's baby, and she believes she is marrying her idol Bobby. All while experiencing periodic flashbacks to the night of her assault.

After the wedding when "Bobby" attempts to initiate their wedding night, she has a flashback to her assault, and strikes "Bobby" which prompts him to flee the small town, and her delusion of their relationship to shatter into the reality that she finds herself married to the man who assaulted her, and very pregnant with his child.

Soon after she goes into labour, and gives birth to a mutated baby that is able to speak from birth. The government begins making rounds offering the town's citizens bottles of poisonous liquid in order to take their own lives rather than live with the mutations being caused by the purple mist from the factory accident.

Stepphy awakes one morning to the sounds of her baby calling her, and decides to take her own life with the poisonous liquid. She takes the bottle, and goes to the room where her daughter is calling for her, and confronts the baby asking her why she can speak. The baby replies that she doesn't know why she hears her talking, but that she just doesn't want her mommy to leave her alone.

The babies words finally shatter the remainder of her delusions, and she is able to see her baby as the normal crying infant that she is, that is not capable of speech, and plans to take her daughter, and leave. Her husband intercepts her, and tries to take the baby, and feed her the contents of the poisonous bottle, prompting Stepphy to strike him in the head with a lamp. Causing him to collapse, bleeding from the head.

She goes downstairs leaving him to die presumably, and tells her father that they have to leave. Her father refuses to go with her, but tells her that she, and her daughter should go, and leave him there.

She leaves with her daughter, and starts a new life in New York. Next we see her a few years later, auditioning before a talent agent in the city, before picking up her now five year old daughter from the park.

== Cast ==
- Jane Levy as Stepphy Holiday
- Justin Chatwin as Bobby Shore
- Peter Stormare as George Holiday
- Kristian Bruun as Helmut
- David Reale as Fabian
- Chloe Rose as Fifi
- Boyd Banks as Gord
- Seán Cullen as Jack Avery
- Stephen Joffe as Bennett

== Production ==
In March 2014, it was announced Jane Levy, Justin Chatwin and Peter Stormare will star in the film, with Jeffrey St. Jules directing from a screenplay he wrote. Principal photography began on February 12, 2014 in Toronto.

== Awards ==
The film won the award for Best Canadian First Feature Film at the 2014 Toronto International Film Festival, and was named the winner of the 2014 Claude Jutra Award. The TIFF jury remarked, "For its ingenious mixing of genres, sophisticated blend of tones and ability to create its own strange, tragicomic and original world without sacrificing any richness in regards to story, character and emotion, the jury recognizes as Best Canadian First Feature Film Bang Bang Baby by Jeffrey St. Jules." The award carries a cash prize of $15,000.

The film garnered two Canadian Screen Award nominations at the 3rd Canadian Screen Awards, for Best Supporting Actor (Chatwin) and Best Overall Sound (Christopher Guglick, Dave Mercel, Steve Moore, Justin Sawyer and Alex Turner).

== Release ==
Bang Bang Baby premiered in 2014 at the Toronto International Film Festival on September 8. The film was also screened at Santa Barbara International Film Festival on February 5, 2015 and Omaha Film Festival on March 11. The film opened in select theaters in Canada on August 21, 2015 distributed by Search Engine Films. On November 10, 2015 the film was released in U.S through video on demand by Random Media.

== Critical reception ==
Bang Bang Baby received mixed reviews from critics. On Rotten Tomatoes the film has a rating of 67%, based on 9 reviews, with an average rating of 6.6/10. Bruce Demara of Toronto Star gave the film a negative review writing: "St. Jules clearly has talent. What he needs is a story that maintains its consistent level of zany wit from beginning to end.". Glenn Sumi of Now Toronto, on the other hand, gave the film a positive review writing: "St. Jules's script takes too many detours, and many plot points aren't carried through. Sometimes the meta film jokes feel strained. But he gets strong performances from the cast, who all channel 60s archetypes while maintaining their individuality."
