= Because Why =

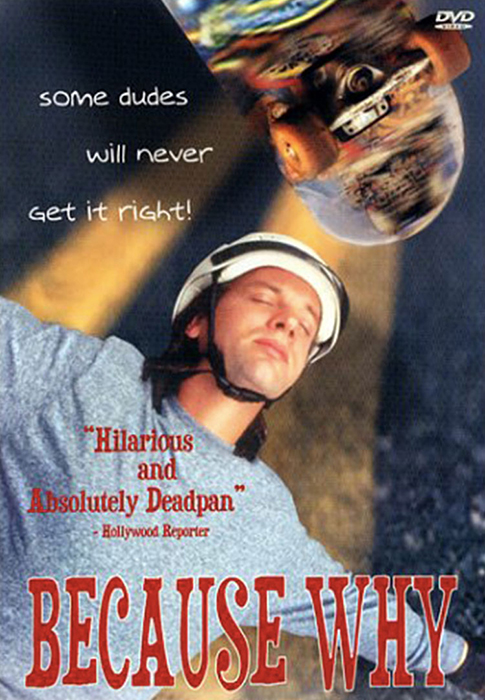
- Poster of the movie
- Directed by: Arto Paragamian
- Written by: Arto Paragamian
- Produced by: Claude Gagnon
- Starring: Michael Riley; Martine Rochon; Doru Bandol; Heather Mathieson
- Cinematography: Norayr Kasper
- Edited by: André Turpin
- Music by: Nana Vasconcelos
- Production companies: Aska Film, Cinoque Films
- Release date: September 1993 (Canada)
- Running time: 104 minutes
- Country: Canada
- Language: English

Because Why is a 1993 Canadian independent film, directed by Arto Paragamian and starring Michael Riley. Very low-keyed, with doses of comedy, the film won the Audience Award at the 1994 Mannheim International Film Festival.

== Plot ==
After several years of travelling abroad Alex returns to his hometown. All he has is a backpack, a skateboard and a slip of paper with an ex-girlfriend's address. When this address turns out to be an empty lot, Alex feels lost. He then moves into a neighbourhood which features an odd array of characters.
