= Dev Singh =

Canadian film editor

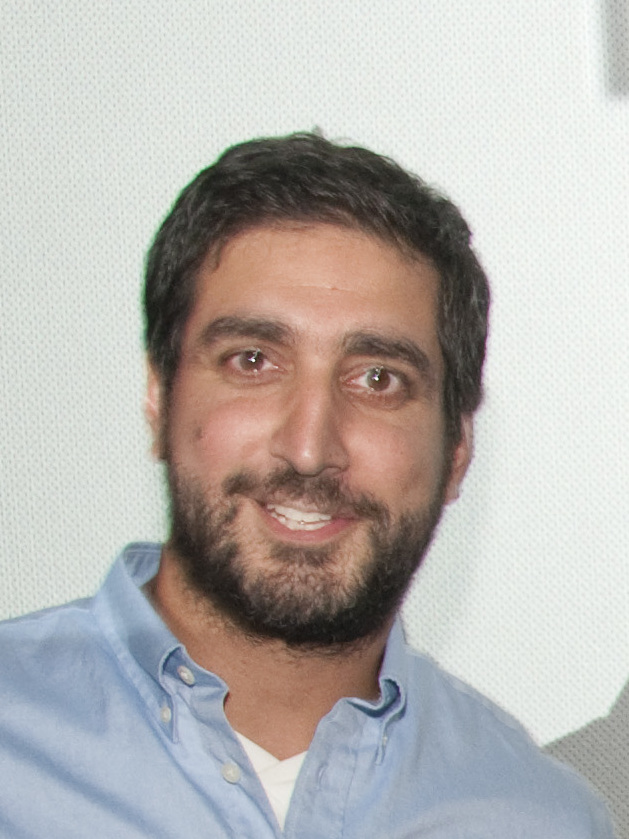
Dev Sing at the 2011 SDF premier

Dev Singh is a Canadian film editor. He is most noted for his work on the film Cinema of Sleep, for which he was a Canadian Screen Award nominee for Best Editing at the 10th Canadian Screen Awards in 2022.

His other credits have included the films Picture Day, Backcountry, Lavender, Milton's Secret, Spiral, Resident Evil: Welcome to Raccoon City and The Switch.
