= Cadillac Girls =

- Directed by: Nicholas Kendall
- Written by: Peter Behrens
- Produced by: Nicholas Kendall; Christopher Zimmer; Christian Bruyère
- Starring: Jennifer Dale; Mia Kirshner; Adam Beach; Gregory Harrison
- Cinematography: Glen MacPherson
- Edited by: Lara Mazur
- Music by: Simon Kendall
- Production companies: Telefilm Canada; National Film Board of Canada
- Distributed by: Cineplex Odeon Films
- Release dates: May 28, 1993 (Seattle); January 21, 1994 (Canada)
- Running time: 96 minutes
- Country: Canada
- Language: English

Cadillac Girls is a 1993 Canadian drama film directed by Nicholas Kendall and starring Jennifer Dale, Mia Kirshner, Adam Beach, and Gregory Harrison.

== Plot ==
Sally (Jennifer Dale) is a college professor and single mother in San Francisco who moves with her troubled and delinquent daughter Page (Mia Kirshner) back to her hometown of Ingonish, Nova Scotia after her father's death. Page takes quite favourably to smalltown life and begins dating Will (Adam Beach), while Sally begins a new relationship with poet Sam (Gregory Harrison), but all of their new happiness leaves Sally struggling to decide what to do when she is offered her dream job with Harvard University.

== Awards ==
At the 14th Genie Awards, musician and composer Simon Kendall won the award for Best Original Score for his work on the film.
