= Kayla (film) =

- Directed by: Nicholas Kendall
- Written by: Peter Behrens
- Based on: Three Dog Winter by Elizabeth van Steenwyk
- Produced by: Claudio Luca; Colin Neale
- Starring: Tod Fennell; Bronwen Booth; Henry Czerny; Meredith Henderson
- Cinematography: John Berrie
- Edited by: Jean-Marie B. Drot
- Music by: Milan Kymlicka
- Production company: Taurus Films
- Distributed by: Questar Entertainment
- Release date: February 28, 1998 (FIFEM)
- Running time: 96 minutes
- Country: Canada
- Language: English

Kayla is a Canadian family drama film, directed by Nicholas Kendall and released in 1998.

Set in the 1920s, the film stars Tod Fennell as Sam Mackenzie, a 12-year-boy who is living with his widowed mother Althea (Bronwen Booth) and her new husband Asa (Henry Czerny) in the Estrie region of Quebec following the death of his father, a former polar explorer and sled dog racer. However, Sam has never accepted that his father is dead, and continues to believe that he will someday return to take Sam back to his old home. One day he encounters and befriends a wild dog who resembles one of his father's sled dogs; naming her Kayla, he decides to start training to compete in a sled dog race, through which he begins to learn how he can accept and embrace Asa as a stepfather without dishonoring his own father's memory.

The cast also includes Meredith Henderson as Jaynie Nightingale, a friend and classmate of Sam's who is herself grieving the recent death of her mother, and Brian Dooley as Jaynie's father August, as well as Ricky Mabe, Daniela Akerblom, Vlasta Vrana, Carl Marotte, William Ford, David Deveau, Anthony Etesonne-Bedard, William Barwick, Graig O'Reilly, David Elkin, Erik Duhamel, Marika Lhoumeau and Chris Michaels in supporting roles.

== Production ==
The film was shot in February 1997 in Quebec. It was adapted from the novel Three Dog Winter by Elizabeth van Steenwyk.

== Distribution ==
The film premiered at the 1998 Montreal International Children's Film Festival.

== Critical response ==
Kathryn Greenaway of the Montreal Gazette praised the film as charming, well-made and well-acted, singling out Czerny's performance as a highlight.

Marke Andrews of the Vancouver Sun wrote that the film had the potential to become a classic as beloved as the Tales for All series.

Charles-Henri Ramond of Films du Québec noted the film's significant similarities to the 1986 film Toby McTeague.

== Awards ==
At FIFEM, the film was the winner of the People's Choice Award for most popular film in the festival programme.

Stéphane Roy and Nicoletta Massone received a Jutra Award nomination for Best Art Direction at the 1st Jutra Awards in 1999.
