= Cosmos (1996 film) =

- Film poster
- Directed by: Jennifer Alleyn; Manon Briand; Marie-Julie Dallaire; Arto Paragamian; André Turpin; Denis Villeneuve
- Produced by: Roger Frappier
- Cinematography: André Turpin
- Production company: Max Films Productions
- Distributed by: Magouric Distribution
- Release date: 15 November 1996
- Running time: 100 minutes
- Country: Canada
- Budget: $1,000,000

Cosmos is a Canadian drama anthology film, released in 1996. Written and directed by Jennifer Alleyn, Manon Briand, Marie-Julie Dallaire, Arto Paragamian, André Turpin and Denis Villeneuve, the film is an anthology of six black and white short films, one by each of the credited directors, linked by the common character of Cosmos (Igor Ovadis), a Greek immigrant working as a cab driver in Montreal.

The film, made by a collective of then-emerging young directors, was considered an unofficial sequel to Montreal Stories (Montréal vu par...), a 1991 anthology film by six more established filmmakers.

== Segments ==
- "Jules et Fanny" (André Turpin) — Fanny (Marie-France Lambert), a lawyer, reunites with Jules (Alexis Martin), her ex-boyfriend who is fascinated by her new breast implants.
- "Cosmos et agriculture" (Arto Paragamian) — Cosmos and Janvier (Marc Jeanty) chase down two men who have stolen a cab.
- "Le Technétium" (Denis Villeneuve) — A filmmaker (David La Haye) nervously travels to a scheduled television interview with Nadja (Audrey Benoît).
- "Aurore et Crépuscule" (Jennifer Alleyn) — After being stood up by her boyfriend on her 20th birthday, Aurore (Sarah-Jeanne Salvy) meets an older man (Gabriel Gascon) who takes her out to play pool.
- "Boost" (Manon Briand) — Yannie (Marie-Hélène Montpetit) spends the day with Joël (Pascal Contamine), a gay friend anxiously awaiting the results of his HIV test.
- "L'Individu" (Marie–Julie Dallaire) — A serial killer (Sébastien Joannette) tracks his planned next victim.

== Cast ==
- Jules et Fanny
  - Marie-France Lambert
  - Alexis Martin
  - Stéphane Crête
  - Martin Neufeld
  - Marjolaine Huard
- Cosmos et agriculture
  - Igor Ovadis
  - Marc Jeanty
- Le Technétium
  - David La Haye
  - Audrey Benoit
  - Carl Alacchi
- Aurore et Crépuscule
  - Sarah-Jeanne Salvy
  - Gabriel Gascon
  - Normand Daneau
- Boost
  - Marie-Helene Montpetit
  - Pascal Contamine
  - France Castel
- L'Individu
  - Sebastien Joannette
  - Eve Gadouas
  - André Forcier
  - Patricia Groleau
  - Mireille Naggar
  - Élise Guilbault

== Background ==
All six directors studied together at Concordia University film department and Turpin had worked with all his collaborators before, as director of cinematography. Each of the directors also make cameo appearances in the others segments. Igor Ovadis, who plays Cosmos, like his character, is also an immigrant. Turpin said his piece is based on an actual encounter, when he "ran into an old girlfriend at a party and she told me had her breasts enlarged", and he asked to see them, and she said no, so he based his short on the incident.

== Reception ==
Anita Gates wrote in The New York Times, that the movie is "a skillful, satisfying black-and-white film with classic art-house style." She also complimented Turpin for his cinematography. She observed that "its questions are often answered symbolically rather than directly." She also notes that when "Yannie is waiting outside the AIDS clinic for Joël, they start playing with the windshield wipers, even though the car battery failed earlier in the day. Whether or not the car goes dead again seems powerfully significant."

Film critic Brendan Kelly wrote in his review for Variety Magazine that the film "manages to avoid many of the pitfalls of the multi-director genre thanks to the film's hip feel and look". He goes on to say that "as usual with this kind of effort, the quality of the six segments varies widely, going from mediocre to fairly inspired, with the strongest sections courtesy of Andre Turpin, Denis Villeneuve and Arto Paragamian." He also praised Turpin for his cinematography, writing "once again he shows verve and skill behind the camera, creating a vivid, innovative portrait of inner–city Montreal."

== Awards and nominations ==
The film was Canada's submission to the 70th Academy Awards for Best Foreign Language Film, but did not make the shortlist. It was also a shortlisted nominee for Best Motion Picture at the 18th Genie Awards, but lost to The Sweet Hereafter. In 1997, the film was selected to screen at the Cannes Film Festival Directors' Fortnight, and cinematographer Andre Turpin won best feature-length photography at Rendez-vous Québec Cinéma the same year.

== See also ==
- List of submissions to the 70th Academy Awards for Best Foreign Language Film
- List of Canadian submissions for the Academy Award for Best Foreign Language Film
