= The Law of Dreams =

2006 historical fiction novel by Peter Behrens

- Author: Peter Behrens
- Language: English
- Genre: Literary fiction, historical fiction
- Publisher: House of Anansi Press; Steerforth Press
- Publication date: August 22, 2006
- Publication place: Canada
- Pages: 408 pp
- ISBN: 978-0-88784-207-8 (Anansi); ISBN 978-1-58642-117-5 (Steerforth)
- OCLC: 69186676

The Law of Dreams is a historical fiction novel about the Great Famine of Ireland by Canadian author Peter Behrens. Published in 2006 by House of Anansi Press, it was the recipient of that year's Governor General's Award for English language fiction.

== Plot overview ==
The novel follows the young Fergus O'Brien, who lives and works with his tenant family on a potato farm in Ireland. When the Great Famine begins in 1847, a mold spreads through the potato farms of the country, ruining the crop. Even after ten weeks of the famine, Fergus's father refuses to leave the farm in County Clare, and eventually the family, save Fergus, is burned alive in their shack as they lie in bed, weak with hunger. Fergus is sent to a workhouse, where he comes to realize that he must leave soon before he dies of either fever or hunger. After escaping, he travels across the country, to Liverpool and Wales, joining a gang of thieves, working on the railways, and dreaming of the unknown land of America where he eventually emigrates.

== Reception ==
The Law of Dreams was widely acclaimed by critics, who called it an "ambitious epic", "impressive, swiftly paced saga", "fearsome story," and "absorbing, unsparing and beautifully written account". Ron Charles, a senior editor of The Washington Post's Book World section, named it his favourite of 2006 and compared Behrens' style to "pure magic".

Although one reviewer criticized the novel for "veer[ing] dangerously close to melodrama", another praised Behrens for "teach[ing] us again ... that the past was indeed ... a very real place". The character of Fergus was called "thin and unconvincing as a narrator" by one critic, but another praised the narration as "a mingling of Behrens's rich narrative voice and scraps of startling wisdom that seem to emanate directly from Fergus's mind". The author's style was also commended for its "strange, hard poetry" and "stark style admirably suited to conveying the horrors of starvation and despair."

=== Awards ===
The Law of Dreams was the recipient of the 2006 Governor General's Award for English-language fiction, along with a CAN$15,000 prize, awarded by the Canada Council for the Arts. The jury praised the book as an "artfully-woven tale of mythic scope" and called Fergus a "complex and morally-heroic character".

In 2007, the novel was also nominated for the Amazon.ca/Books in Canada First Novel Award, the Rogers Writers' Trust Fiction Prize, and the Commonwealth Writers' Prize for Best Book from Canada and the Caribbean.
