= Simon Kendall =

Canadian rock musician and film composer

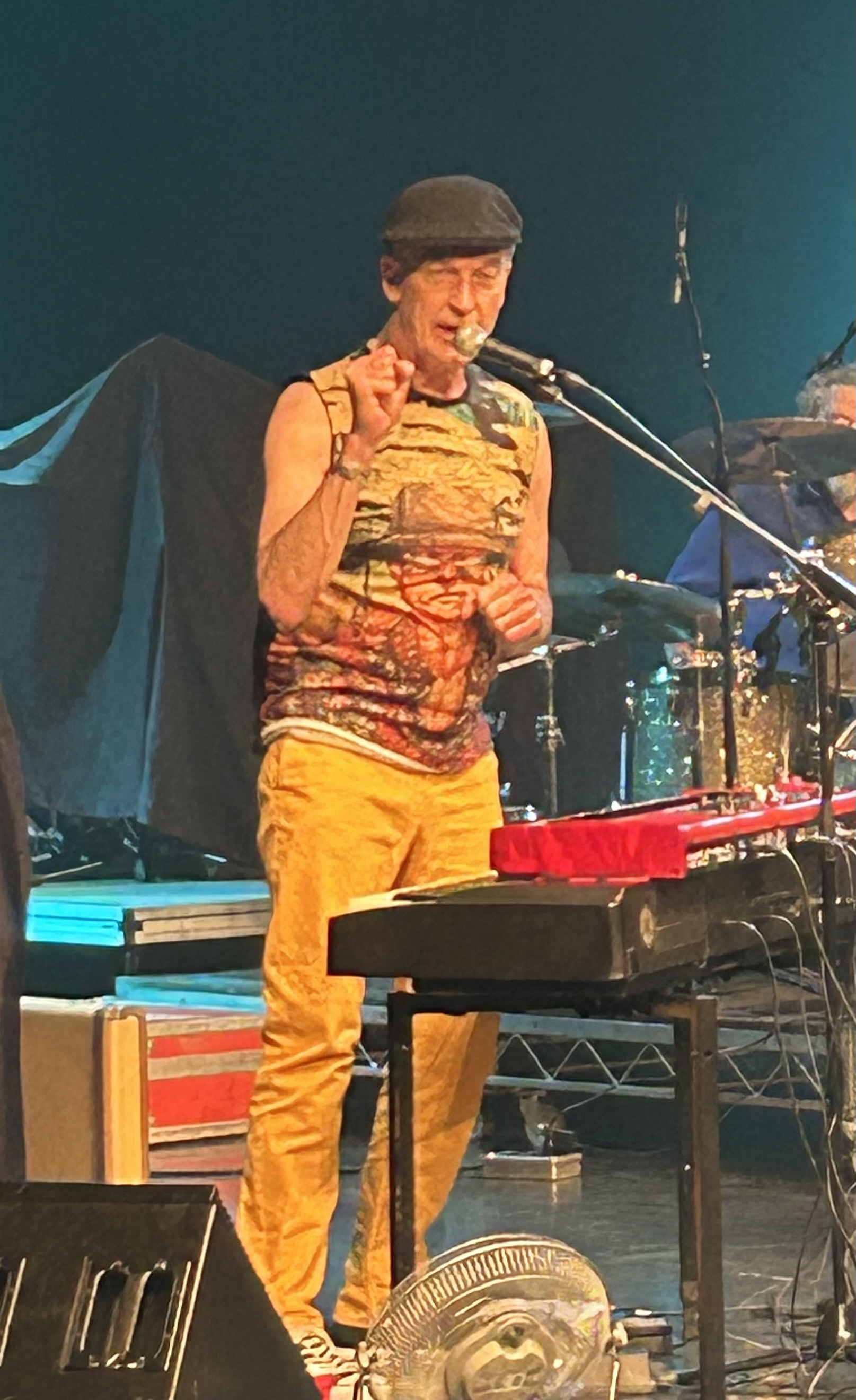
Kendall performing at a Doug and the Slugs concert on March 27, 2026 at Great Canadian Casino, Coquitlam, BC

Simon Kendall is a Canadian rock musician and film composer. The longtime keyboardist for Doug and the Slugs, he won the Genie Award for Best Original Score at the 14th Genie Awards in 1993 for the film Cadillac Girls, and was shortlisted for Best Original Song at the 22nd Genie Awards in 2001 for "Parting Glass", a song which he cowrote with Tom Landa and Geoffrey Kelly for the film Lunch with Charles.

He has frequently composed music for the films of his brother, director Nicholas Kendall, including Do It with Joy, Cadillac Girls and Mr. Rice's Secret.

In 2005, Kendall joined with Rob Baker, Craig Northey, Doug Elliott and Pat Steward in the supergroup project Stripper's Union. He has also been a frequent session musician for Colin James, and with The Stellar Band of Neighbours, an occasional touring band whose members include Wyckham Porteous, Steven Drake, Kevin Kane and Johnny Fay.
