= Clean Rite Cowboy =

2000 Canadian short film

- Directed by: Michael Downing
- Written by: Michael Downing
- Produced by: Joel Awerbuck; Michael Downing
- Starring: John Robinson; Christie MacFadyen
- Cinematography: Barry Stone
- Edited by: David Stein
- Music by: Greg Keelor
- Production company: Paradox Pictures
- Release date: September 13, 2000 (TIFF)
- Running time: 21 minutes
- Country: Canada
- Language: English

Clean Rite Cowboy is a 2000 Canadian short drama film, directed by Michael Downing. The film stars John Robinson as Henry, an unhappily married man with a dead-end job as a carpet cleaner, who knocks on a client's door one day only to have his high school girlfriend Diane (Christie MacFadyen) open the door.

The film's cast also includes Gloria Slade as his wife Mona, Luca Perlman as their son Paul, and Tracy Wright and Judy Marshak in supporting roles.

The film premiered on September 9, 2000, at the 2000 Toronto International Film Festival.

It received a Genie Award nomination for Best Live Action Short Drama at the 21st Genie Awards in 2001.
