= Bill Switzer =

Canadian actor

- Occupation: Actor
- Years active: 1996–2004

Bill Switzer is a Canadian former actor. He is known for his work on the animated television series Mummies Alive!. He had a leading role in Eerie, Indiana: The Other Dimension and he also performed in Sabrina: The Animated Series. While he voiced several roles in anime, he was also Philthy from MythQuest and the voice of Harvey Kinkle in Sabrina: The Animated Series and Sam Guthrie / Cannonball in X-Men: Evolution. He also voiced Billy's former friend Nick in the second season of Billy the Cat, replacing Lee Tockar.

== Career ==
Switzer attended his first audition and won his first role, in a Shari Lewis special, when he was a teenager. He voices the lead character; Presley Carnavon in the television show Mummies Alive!

Switzer was nominated for a Young Artist Award for The Christmas List (1997).

Switzer was noticed for his starring role in Mr. Rice's Secret (2000), in which he played a young cancer patient. He was in almost every scene of the film. Elvis Mitchell of the New York Times wrote, "In the leading role, Mr. Switzer is fine as Owen, especially given that he has to spend a great deal of time talking to himself". The Vancouver Province wrote, "[T]here's an appealing freshness to the young cast of this Vancouver-filmed movie, especially Switzer in the lead role".

He had a leading role in the television show Eerie, Indiana: The Other Dimension.

Switzer was reported to be directing a short film at age 17.

== Personal life ==
Switzer, who lived in Tsawwassen at the time Mr. Rice's Secret was in production, was reported to be a good swimmer and baseball player in his youth. He learned to ride a horse for his guest role in The Adventures of Shirley Holmes.

== Selected filmography ==
=== Film ===
- Mail to the Chief – Kenny Witkowski
- Cheats – Garret
- The Dinosaur Hunter – Daniel
- When Danger Follows You Home – Andrew Werden
- Locked in Silence – John
- The Right Connections – Gary Fleming
- The Christmas List – Danny Skyler
- A Call to Remember – Sandy Halper
- The Life – Jason
- Mr. Rice's Secret – Owen Walters
- Death Note – Sasaki (voice)

=== Television ===
- The Adventures of Shirley Holmes – Matt
- Cold Squad – Stewart
- Dead Man's Gun – JoJo
- The Dead Zone – Doug Hirsh
- Eerie, Indiana: The Other Dimension – Mitchell Taylor
- First Wave – Nick Patterson
- MythQuest – Philthy
- Scorn – David
- The Sentinel – Edward Lazar

=== Anime roles ===
- Mobile Suit Gundam SEED – Sai Argyle
- Mobile Suit Gundam: Char's Counterattack – Hathaway Noah
- Zoids: New Century Zero – Jamie Hemeros, Lineback
- Cardcaptors – Eli Moon
- MegaMan NT Warrior – Chaud Blaze
- Infinite Ryvius – Ikumi Oze
- Ranma ½ – Harumaki's Grandson
- Master Keaton – Shinsuke Yunase
- Dragon Drive – Ichiro Sumishiba
- Trouble Chocolate – Boy with Card, Raisin
- Boys Over Flowers – Junpei Oribe

=== Voice Work ===
- Billy the Cat – Nick (Season 2)
- Extreme Dinosaurs – Additional voices
- Greatest Heroes and Legends of the Bible – Various characters
- Mama, Do You Love Me? – Sam and Rascal
- Milo's Bug Quest
- Mummies Alive! – Presley Carnavon
- Rainbow Fish – Stingo
- Sabrina: The Animated Series – Harvey Kinkle
- Silverwing – Shade
- X-Men: Evolution – Sam Guthrie / Cannonball

=== Video games ===
- Mobile Suit Gundam: Encounters in Space – Kou Uraki
- Mobile Suit Gundam SEED: Never Ending Tomorrow – Sai Argyle
- Sabrina: The Animated Series: Magical Adventure – Harvey Kinkle
