= Mr. Rice's Secret =

- Directed by: Nicholas Kendall
- Written by: J. H. Wyman
- Produced by: Colleen Hardwick Nystedt
- Starring: David Bowie; Bill Switzer; Teryl Rothery; Garwin Sanford; Zach Lipovsky; Jason Anderson; Richard de Klerk
- Edited by: Ron E. Yoshida
- Music by: Simon Kendall; Al Rodger
- Production company: Panorama
- Distributed by: Panorama
- Release date: 1999
- Running time: 113 minutes
- Country: Canada
- Language: English
- Budget: $3.2 million

Mr. Rice's Secret is a 1999 Canadian family drama film directed by Nicholas Kendall, an instructor at Capilano University in Vancouver. It was written by J. H. Wyman and stars David Bowie as the title character, a mysterious man who leaves after death a series of clues to a 12-year-old boy with cancer, to help him appreciate life. The production was filmed in 1998 and released in 2000.

== Plot ==
Owen Walters is 12 and suffers from Hodgkin's disease. He has a group of friends who award points to each other for doing risky or strange acts. Owen's parents want him to befriend Simon, who has leukemia, but he rejects him as he considers Simon to be more ill than he, reminding him of his own mortality. He also rejects his best friend Funnel Head to win the approval of bullies.

Owen's mysterious neighbour Mr. Rice dies, and Owen secretly videotapes the funeral to show to his friends. They go to Rice's house to watch it on his video player, and scour through his belongings, finding a letter for Owen. He decodes it with a ring he received from Rice, and finds that it is a series of clues leading to a secret. The boys go looking for the clues, one of which involves exhuming Rice.

Rice appears in flashbacks over the film, including one where he tells Owen "All people, no matter who they are, they all wish they'd appreciated life more. It's what you do in life that's important, not how much time you have”. Owen finds the potion of life which allowed Rice to live for 400 years. However, he makes a recovery from his treatment, and instead gives the potion to Simon to save his life.

== Cast ==
- David Bowie as Mr Rice
- Bill Switzer as Owen
- Garwin Sanford as Stan
- Teryl Rothery as Marilyn
- Zachary Lipovsky
- Jason Anderson
- Tyler Thompson
- Richard De Klerk
- Campbell Lane
- Tyler Labine

== Production ==
Most of it was filmed in New Westminster, in the Lower Mainland of British Columbia.

Peter O'Toole was originally considered for the role of Rice, but negotiations fell through and the role went to Bowie, who enjoyed reading the script. Recording had begun before Bowie was cast, and the crew were amazed that he would be in the film. The filming location was kept secret so that Bowie would not be disturbed. Kendall recalled Bowie as a quiet and introverted man, who had remarked that he wanted a clone so that he could act alongside his musical and artistic interests.

Producer Colleen Hardwick, who had idolised Bowie as a schoolgirl, said she "about died" to hear him make the phonecall to accept the role. She too recalled how he mixed with all members of the cast and crew. Hardwick likened Rice's advice to Owen with how Bowie accepted his own imminent death from cancer in January 2016.

The film was originally known as Exhuming Mr. Rice. It was released on DVD in Region 1 in September 2001 and Region 2 that November.

== Reception ==
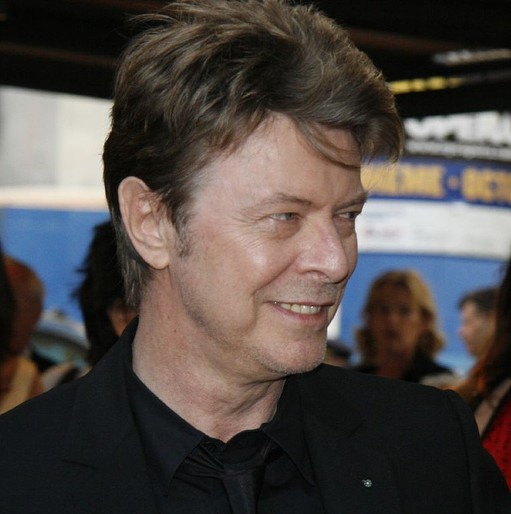
David Bowie was praised for his portrayal of Mr. Rice, although the lack of development of the character and the brevity of the role were criticised

The film received mixed reviews. The Review aggregator Rotten Tomatoes rates it as 50% from six reviews, with equal numbers of generally positive and negative reviews.

Robert Roten of the Laramie Movie Scope gave the film a B, for telling a story about cancer in a "very non-depressing and positive way". He found Owen to be a well-developed character and a realistic reflection of children struggling with cancer. Roten summed the film up as "very well-written, well-acted and well-directed" and also praised its "haunting, etheral Celtic-flavored music", but pointed out that fans of Bowie would be disappointed that he only appears for around ten minutes.

Writing for Film Journal International, Maria Garcia noted that there were plot holes that adults would notice, but in all the film was "didactic, yet not condescending, and inspirational without being corny. That's quite an achievement for any film, but especially for one that takes the high moral ground, as this one does".

James Kendrick of Q called the plot "clever" without being "preachy" about its theme. He was impressed by Switzer's role as a complex character. However, he pointed out that although Rice's appearances exclusively in flashbacks created an "aura" around the character, it should have been explained how he and Owen had become friends in the first place. Kendrick was repulsed by the scene of the children exhuming Rice, finding it too graphic to be legitimately considered as a metaphor for Owen confronting death eye-to-eye.

In The New York Times, Elvis Mitchell found Bowie to be the highlight of the film, noting how he brought a presence to small roles. However, Mitchell called the film "bland and ordinary", naming the exhumation scene as one of few exceptions.
