= The Christmas List =

- Written by: Marie Weiss
- Directed by: Charles Jarrott
- Starring: Mimi Rogers; Rob Stewart; Stella Stevens; Enuka Okuma; Marla Maples
- Country of origin: United States
- Original language: English

Production
- Producer: Lance H. Robbins
- Running time: 86 minutes
- Production companies: Saban Entertainment; International Family Entertainment, Inc.

Original release
- Network: The Family Channel
- Release: December 1, 1997

The Christmas List is a 1997 TV movie, shown first on The Family Channel, thereafter on ABC Family during its 25 Days of Christmas programming block. It stars Mimi Rogers.

== Plot ==
Melody Parris is a 35-year-old skilled perfume girl who is living a somewhat flavorless life in Seattle, with a pompous, pushy boyfriend named George and an overbearing mother who lives right next door to her, who is obsessed with her getting married.

It starts with another unsatisfactory day at work for Melody, but on the bus, her best friend Naomi tells her to make a Christmas list for selfish fun. She starts to but then receives a call from George, who is on a flight home from a business trip.

During a talk with her mother that evening, she asks her if they could try to make their Christmas "Dickens-Style"; however her mother is reluctant to do this. Another neighbor's daughter, Amber Mottola, is a supermodel, and her mother harps on how Melody's sister is married, and so Melody storms out, saying that she's sorry she's not anything that makes her mother proud, missing her mother saying that she is proud.

The next day at work, Melody is passed over for a promotion to the head of the perfume department at the department store where she works for a younger, less skilled co-worker, April May, whose main objective is to sell, not to serve. Melody finally decides to finish her Christmas list, and the next day, she takes it to work and (after some playfulness with Naomi) Naomi puts it in Santa's Mailbox at the department store. Then, things begin to change. She meets Danny Skylar, a boy who wants to buy a perfume that was similar to the smell of his late mother's, and when he can't pay the full amount, Melody loans him the rest, and he puts her name, along with his, on the entry form in a sweepstakes at the store to win a new Ford Mustang convertible.

Danny drags his father to attend the drawing for the Mustang, and his father is surprised when Danny and Melody win. Melody gets into trouble because store employees cannot enter drawings, but Danny explains the mix-up and pledges to give her the car until he can drive. Melody is attracted to Danny's father, Dr. David Skylar, and while she gives them the car, her boyfriend intervenes and they work out a schedule so that they can share the car, which offers opportunities for Melody and Dr. Skylar to start to share a close bond. That same night, a tree appears in Melody's apartment, and Melody's mother changes as well, becoming more maternal and says that the whole family is going to be celebrating Christmas Dickens-style.

When Danny goes to make another payment on the perfume, he asks Melody to go to lunch with him, and George comes as well. However, at lunch Melody and George argue, resulting in Melody pouring a bowl of creme brulee onto George's lap. A woman named Faith is dating Dr. Skylar and wants to eliminate any competition, so she fakes her engagement to Dr. Skylar, buying a fake ring and bragging to Melody. Upset, Melody gives the car to the Skylars to keep. When George proposes clumsily, Melody declines, and when they start to fight, Melody's mother recoils at George, and we find out she put the tree in Melody's apartment, and acted the way she did because she wanted for her daughter to know that she was proud of her. David finds out about Faith's treachery and dumps her. He and Danny drive to Melody's apartment building where David proposes and Melody accepts, much to Danny's delight and approval.

Throughout the movie, Melody starts getting other things on her list that she wanted, whether it be fuzzy slippers, or wanting her family to celebrate Christmas Dickens Style. But she slowly realizes that while getting everything she wants, repercussions are inevitable, and she realizes that what you want is not always what you need. As she starts to fill up the holes from the list, she begins a new life with David, Danny and even having a new baby.

== Cast ==
- Mimi Rogers as Melody Parris
- Rob Stewart as Dr. David Skyler
- Stella Stevens as Natalie Parris
- Bill Switzer as Danny Skyler
- Enuka Okuma as Naomi
- Jano Frandsen as George
- Madison Graie as April May
- Andrew Johnston as Mr. Garnett
- George Pilgrim
- Marla Maples as Faith
- Tony Griffin as Eric Katz
- Gary Hetherington as Daumier
- Tanja Reichert as Suzie (as Tanja Reichart)
- Anne Farquhar as Caroline
- Paul Raskin as Ted

== Production ==
While the film is set in Seattle, it was shot in Vancouver, Canada. Shooting occurred during late 1997, and wrapped on October 31. The film had a shorter than usual post-production, as it premiered on December 1, 1997, which was just 31 days after it had completed shooting.

== Music ==
The song at the beginning of the film is a vocal holiday rendition of "A Time For Tony", written in 1963 by Merv Griffin (the film's executive producer). "A Time For Tony" is better known by its alternate title "Think!", which has been used as the music for the final round of the game show Jeopardy! since the show's premiere in 1964 and also as the show's theme song beginning in 1984.

Towards the end of the film, two child characters are watching television, and the theme song for Ninja Turtles: The Next Mutation can be heard be playing. The show premiered in the fall of 1997, when The Christmas List was being shot, and was produced by Shavick Entertainment and Saban Entertainment, who were behind The Christmas List. The theme song is credited to Haim Saban and Shuki Levy from Saban Entertainment, which meant no royalties had to be paid to use the song, since Saban already owned the rights to it.

== Reception ==
Screen Rant noted, "Not many may have heard of this one, but the entire family can sit down together and watch it this year and beyond." The Irish Examiner wrote, "Audiences enjoyed seeing Mimi Rogers' character mysteriously get everything she wanted at Christmas. Even more than that they enjoyed seeing her deal with the unforeseen strings attached to each and every gift. "

The film was noted for its exploration of the Christmas-film topic "what a difference a year makes".
