= David Reale =

Canadian actor (born 1984)

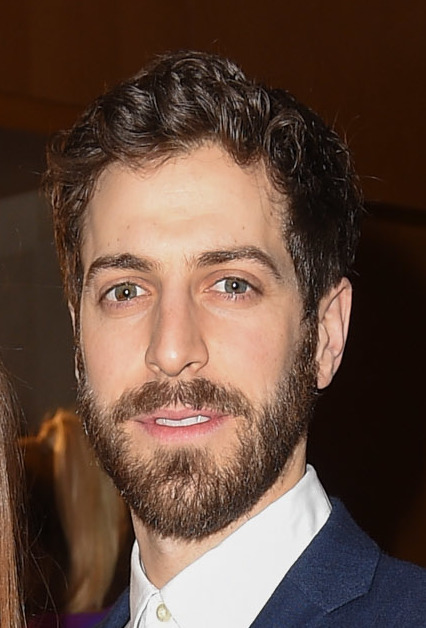
- Reale in 2017
- Occupation: Actor
- Years active: 1997–present

David Reale is a Canadian actor best known for his recurring role as Benjamin on the legal drama Suits (2011–2019). His work spans film, television, voice acting, and stage. He has appeared in films such as Mean Girls (2004) and Bang Bang Baby (2014). On television, he has had recurring roles in The Boys (2019-2024), American Gods (2021). In addition, he has had leading roles in Canadian series such as Less Than Kosher (2023) and My Dead Mom (2024). He has also performed in theatre, notably starring in a 2016 Canadian production of My Name Is Asher Lev.

== Early life ==
Reale was raised in Caledon, Ontario, and attended Robert F. Hall Catholic Secondary School. He is of Italian descent.

== Career ==
Reale's first notable appearance was as Glen Coco, a minor role in Mean Girls. His most notable television role is Benjamin on Suits.

Reale rose to fame as a child voice actor by voicing Kai Hiwatari on the English version of Beyblade, and also the voice actor of Tsubasa Otori from the spin-off series Beyblade: Metal Fusion. For a brief amount of time, he also voiced Ace Grit and Ren Krawler from the anime series Bakugan: New Vestroia and Bakugan: Gundalian Invaders respectively. Reale replaced Alex House as Ace's voice actor towards the end of New Vestroia, and he voiced Ren during the early parts of Gundalian Invaders, before being replaced by Peter Cugno for the remainder of the season.

He has had a number of Jewish roles.In 2016 he starred as the titular character in a Canadian stage adaptation of My Name Is Asher Lev. In 2023, he starred as Asher, a Rabbi's son in the Canadian web series, Less Than Kosher, which also screened as a film at a number of Jewish film festivals. In the 2024 comedy series, My Dead Mom, he sings in Hebrew.He has said that he declines Jewish roles when the production does not include Jewish involvement in its creative or casting teams.

He also teaches acting classes at George Brown Polytechnic in Toronto, based on the Meisner technique.

== Filmography ==
=== Film ===
Year	Title	Role	Notes
1999	Goya: Awakened in a Dream	Mariano Goya	Television film
1999	If You Believe	Bobby – 9 years old	Television film
2000	Alley Cats Strike	Baron McKay	Television film
2000	Ernest	Ernest	Short film
2002	Tru Confessions	Schoolyard boy	Television film
2002	Beyblade: Fierce Battle	Kai Hiwatari (voice)	
2004	Mean Girls	Glen Coco	Uncredited
2006	I Am an Apartment Building	Teenager	Television short film
2008	Communication Breakdown	Waiter	Short film
2008	One Week	Pete	
2009	Hard Boiled Eggs	—N/a	Short film
2009	Chloe	Student 1	
2009	Man v. Minivan	Graeme	Short film
2010	Red: Werewolf Hunter	Jake Sullivan	Television film
2011	388 Arletta Avenue	Co-worker #2	
2012	How to Keep Your Day Job	Male co-worker	Short film
2014	Ben's at Home	David	
2014	Big News from Grand Rock	Kyle	
2017	Molly's Game	Poker Player	
2019	Georgetown	Weatherford	
2021	The Desperate Hour	CJ	
2021	Angel Falls Christmas	Josh	
2021	V/H/S/94	Tim	Segment "The Empty Wake"
2023	Close to You	Paul	
2025	Nika and Madison	PC Boyd	
2025	Falsehood	Sid Bartlett	

=== Television ===
Year	Title	Role	Notes
2000	Real Kids, Real Adventures	Peter	Episode: "Sucked Underground: The John Collmer Story"
2002–2005	Beyblade	Kai Hiwatari (voice)	Main cast
2002, 2005	Strange Days at Blake Holsey High	Young Victor Pearson	2 episodes
2005	Queer as Folk	Hustler	2 episodes
2006	House Party	Eric	Unsold pilot
2010	Bloodletting & Miraculous Cures	Student in bar	Episode: "The Missing Years"
2010	Bakugan: New Vestroia	Ace Grit (voice)	5 episodes
2010	Bakugan: Gundalian Invaders	Ren Krawler (voice)	9 episodes
2010–2013	Beyblade: Metal Fusion	Tsubasa Otori (voice)	Main cast
2010	The Dating Guy	Derek (voice)	Episode: "Too Fast Too Dexler"
2011	Skins	Dave	3 episodes
2013–2014	Beyblade: Shogun Steel	Tsubasa Otori (voice)	Main cast
2017	Designated Survivor	Scotty Svenson	Episode: "Backfire"
2011–2019	Suits	Benjamin	Recurring cast
2019	Schitt's Creek	Robber	Episode: "Love Letters"
2019	Murdoch Mysteries	Mr. Clements	Episodes: "Manual for Murder", "One Minute to Murder" and "Annabella Cinderella"
2019–2026	The Boys	Evan Lambert	5 episodes
2021	American Gods	Dr. Fapp	5 episodes
2022	In the Dark	Patrick	Episode: "Hard Pill to Swallow"
2023	Less Than Kosher	Ash	7 episodes
2024	My Dead Mom	Jude	
2025	Murderbot	GrayCris Yellow	2 episodes
2025	Boston Blue	Tod Merrick	1 episode
2026	Saint-Pierre	John Webb	1 episode
2026	Memory of a Killer	Corey the neighbor	1 episode
2026	The Millwood Murders: Buried Truth	Robert Buchanan	TV movie

=== Video games ===
Year	Title	Role	Notes
2013	Tom Clancy's Splinter Cell: Blacklist	Charlie Cole	Voice and performance capture
