= Two Thousand and None =

2000 Canadian dark comedy drama film

- Movie poster
- Directed by: Arto Paragamian
- Written by: Arto Paragamian
- Produced by: Arnie Gelbart
- Starring: John Turturro; Oleg Kisseliov; Katherine Borowitz; Julian Richings
- Cinematography: Norayr Kasper
- Edited by: Alain Baril
- Music by: Milan Kymlicka
- Production company: Galafilm Productions
- Distributed by: Seville Pictures (Canada)
- Release date: September 2000 (TIFF)
- Running time: 94 minutes
- Country: Canada
- Language: English
- Budget: $4.8 million (CAD)

Two Thousand and None is a Canadian independent dark comedy drama film directed by Arto Paragamian and starring John Turturro, Oleg Kisseliov, Katherine Borowitz, and Julian Richings. Turturro plays a palaeontologist with only six weeks to live, the film premiered at the 2000 Taormina Film Festival, where it won the FIPRESCI award for "the confirmation of a new talent, its imaginative exploration of a difficult subject and the exceptional acting of John Turturro." It received mixed to negative reviews from critics.

== Plot ==
A recently divorced paleontologist, Benjamin Kasparian, visits his doctor, who informs him that he is suffering from an unusual brain disease called Talbot's Syndrome, and that he has less than six weeks to live. Initially philosophical about his fate, Kasparian decides to enjoy himself as much as he can until his imminent death, much to the disapproval of his ex-wife, Amanda, who watches him have an ill-advised affair with a younger woman, Daphne. Kasparian's best friend, his boss, and the museum's curator are all disapproving as well, unsure of why he is acting so strangely. Jeremiah, Kasparian's best friend, criticizes the curator for eating during a moment of grief, but Kasparian finds their reactions bizarre, as he sees his impending death as a chance to get the most out of life. Before long, he starts having evocative visions of his childhood in Armenia and decides, as his last mission in life, to dig up his parents in Canada and bury them in Armenia, where he believes his family belongs.

When his plan fails after an airport official catches him with human bones in his luggage, he steals his own cloned brain and buries it, along with the bones of his parents, in a makeshift grave after posing them humorously. After he begins struggling with memory lapses due to his condition, he wakes up outside the museum where he used to work, unaware of where he is. The museum's curator, shocked by Kasparian's childlike and frightened appearance, brings him indoors. Not long after this, he dies, and his spirit is last seen wandering, beginning a new journey with no particular destination. Amanda is unsure of how to move on from her ex-husband's death, as their relationship was complicated.

== Cast ==
- John Turturro as Benjamin Kasparian
- Oleg Kisseliov as Jeremiah
- Katherine Borowitz as Amanda
- Julian Richings as Curator
- Vanya Rose as Daphne
- Tony Calabretta as Airport Official
- Jayne Heitmeyer as Dr. Maeder

== Reception ==
Derek Elley of Variety was negative about Two Thousand and None, stating, "partly because of the precise, immaculately lit lensing, but mostly because of the bloodless performances and zingless dialogue, the film has an over-clinical feel that plays against the basic concept... Turturro isn’t capable of carrying this kind of black comedy without more help from his surrounding cast, who say their lines but don’t bring much more to the table. The final reel is simply ridiculous." Maurie Alioff of Take One was more positive about the film, noting its lack of oversentimentality about the subject of death, and praising the film's madcap humour: "in his black comedy, Paragamian gets closer in spirit to Woody Allen, even the Farrelly brothers, than Kubrick or Ingmar Bergman. At one point, after the doomed protagonist enjoys bathroom sex with a horny young lady, he hides behind the shower curtain when someone rushes in to use the toilet."
