= The Uncles =

- Directed by: James Allodi
- Written by: James Allodi
- Produced by: Nicholas de Pencier
- Starring: Chris Owens; Kelly Harms; Tara Rosling
- Cinematography: Steve Cosens
- Edited by: David Wharnsby; Christopher Donaldson
- Music by: Orest Hrynewich; Stephen Skratt
- Production company: Runaway Goat Productions
- Release date: September 11, 2000 (TIFF)
- Running time: 93 minutes
- Country: Canada
- Language: English

The Uncles is a 2000 Canadian drama film directed by James Allodi.

The film stars Chris Owens as John, an Italian Canadian restaurant manager in Toronto who is supporting his brother Marco (Kelly Harms), a college student, and sister Celia (Tara Rosling), who is disabled after a head injury. When Celia develops an obsession with kidnapping neighbourhood babies to indulge her maternal instincts, John and Marco hatch a plan to get her pregnant so that she'll have her own baby and stop stealing other people's. The film's cast also includes Dino Tavarone, Veronica Hurnick, Nicola Lipman, Deborah Grover, Alan Van Sprang, Tony Nappo and Carlos Díaz.

The film premiered at the 2000 Toronto International Film Festival. It was a finalist for the Best Canadian Film award at the Toronto Film Critics Association Awards 2001, and was named to TIFF's year-end Canada's Top Ten list.

Owens received a Genie Award nomination for Best Actor at the 22nd Genie Awards in 2002.
