= Darren Fung =

Canadian film and television composer

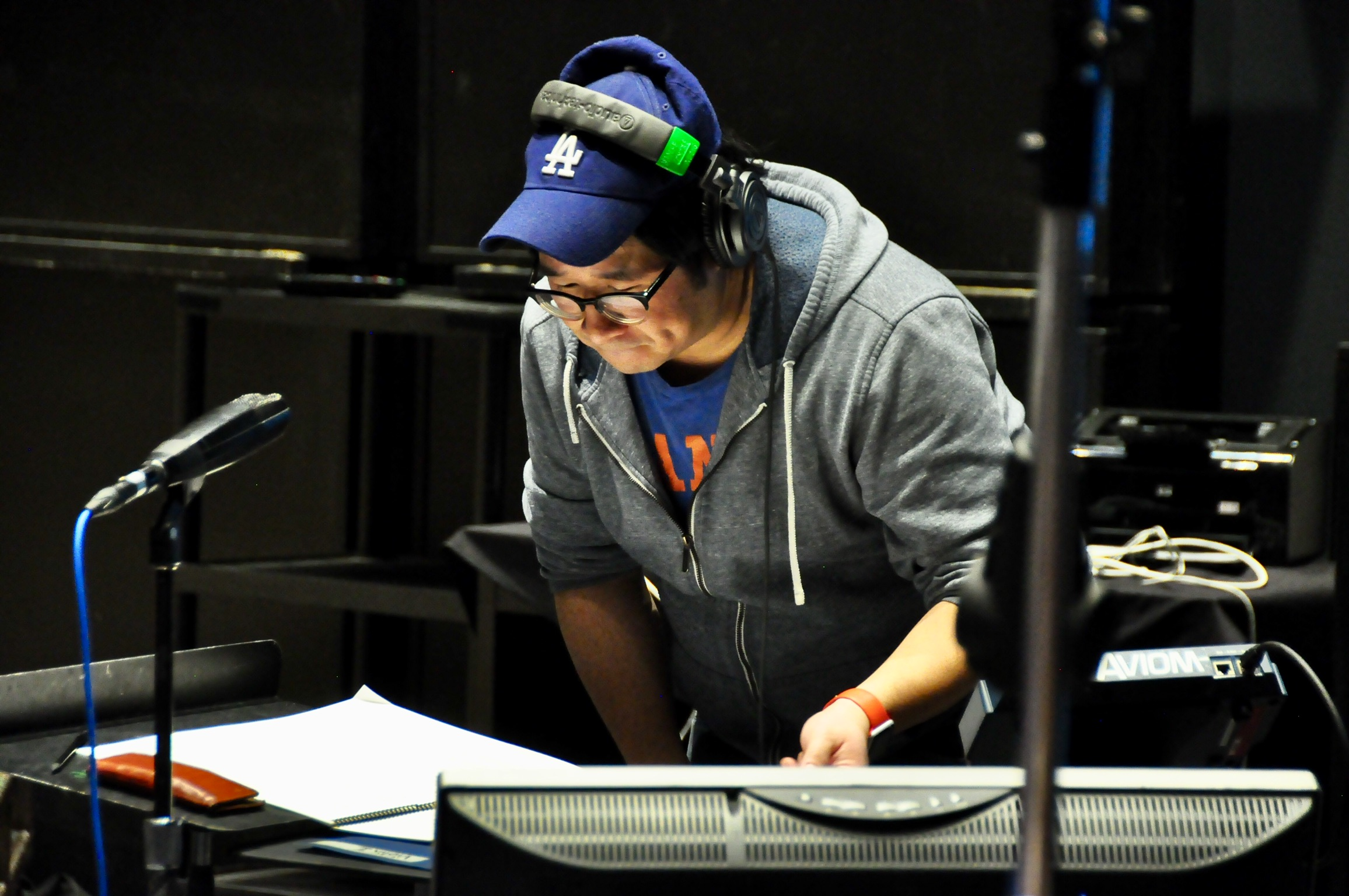
- Born: Edmonton, Alberta, Canada
- Occupation: Composer
- Years active: 2002–present

Darren Fung is a Canadian film and television composer based in Los Angeles. He is best known for scoring The Great Human Odyssey, Equus: Story of the Horse, Bang Bang Baby, and Canada AM.

== Life and career ==
Fung was born in Edmonton, Alberta and is a graduate of McGill University. He was responsible for rearranging and producing the Hockey Theme, often referred to as Canada's second national anthem, for NHL on TSN. His work on Niobe Thompson’s The Great Human Odyssey and Equus: Story of the Horse received critical acclaim and has been presented live in-concert with orchestras across Canada with Darren conducting.

As an arranger and orchestrator, Fung has written numerous orchestral arrangements for Canadian artists including iskwē and Shawnee Kish. He is a long-time board member of the Screen Composers Guild of Canada, and a mentor for the Canadian Film Centre’s Slaight Family Music Lab.

== Selected filmography ==
- 2004 – The Sadness of Johnson Joe Jangles
- 2006 – The Tragic Story of Nling
- 2007 – Just Buried
- 2011 – Lost Years: A People's Struggle for Justice
- 2014 – Danny
- 2014 – Bang Bang Baby
- 2015 – The Making of Une Libération
- 2016 – The Great Human Odyssey: Rise of a Species
- 2017 – Union Leader
- 2018 – Angelique's Isle
- 2018 – The Nature of Things: "Equus: Story of the Horse"
- 2019 – We Happy Few: Roger & James In They Came From Below
- 2020 – A Sugar & Spice Holiday
- 2021 – Bee's Diary
- 2021 – Cinema of Sleep
- 2024 – Calamity Jane
- 2024 – The Silent Planet

== Awards and nominations ==
Year	Result	Award	Category	Work	Ref.
2006	Won	Atlantic Film Festival	Best Original Score	Little Claus & Big Claus	
2013	Nominated	Canadian Screen Awards	Best Original Music for a Non-Fiction Program or Series	Lost Years: A People's Struggle for Justice	
2016	Nominated	International Film Music Critics Association	Best Original Score for a Documentary Film	The Great Human Odyssey: Rise of a Species	
2016	Won	Canadian Screen Awards	Best Original Score for a Documentary Film	The Great Human Odyssey: Rise of a Species	
2016	Nominated	Canadian Screen Awards	Best Original Music for a Non-Fiction Program Or Series	Danny	
2019	Won	Canadian Screen Awards	Best Original Music for a Non-Fiction Program Or Series	Equus: Story of the Horse	
2021	Won	Canadian Screen Awards	Best Original Music for a Non-Fiction Program Or Series	A Bee's Diary	
2022	Nominated	Canadian Screen Awards	Best Original Score	Cinema of Sleep	
