= Foxy Lady, Wild Cherry =

2000 Canadian short film directed by Inez Buchli

- Directed by: Inez Buchli
- Written by: Marlene Rodgers
- Produced by: Marlene Rodgers
- Starring: Natasha Greenblatt; Nina Schock; Todd Duckworth; J. D. Nicholsen
- Cinematography: Marcus Elliott
- Edited by: Jeff Warren
- Music by: Tim Clement
- Distributed by: Nightvision Films
- Release date: September 14, 2000 (TIFF)
- Running time: 21 minutes
- Country: Canada

Foxy Lady, Wild Cherry is a Canadian short drama film, directed by Inez Buchli and released in 2000. The film stars Natasha Greenblatt and Nina Schock as Leah and Karen, two teenage girls who are at the home of Leah's father Dan (Todd Duckworth), and decide to experiment with their burgeoning sexuality by playing a flirtatious game with Dan's friend Ray (J. D. Nicholsen).

The film premiered at the 2000 Toronto International Film Festival.

It was a Genie Award nominee for Best Live Action Short Drama at the 21st Genie Awards in 2001.
