= Soo Garay =

Canadian actress

- Born: Toronto, Ontario, Canada
- Other name: Sue Garay
- Years active: 1994–present
- Spouse: David Hewlett (m. 2000; div. 2004)
- Mother: Valéria Gyenge

Soo Garay is a Canadian actress born in Toronto, Ontario, Canada. She is probably best known for playing Dr. Claire Davison on the TV series Psi Factor: Chronicles of the Paranormal.

== Biography ==
Garay is the daughter of Valéria Gyenge, an athlete who won an Olympic gold medal for Hungary in 1952. Her father is János Garai, former Hungarian water polo player. and her grandfather was fencer János Garay.

=== Career ===
Soo Garay started her career on stage, and has become an accomplished theater actor. Some of her more notable credits include the national tour of Athol Fugard's My Children! My Africa!, Florence Gibson's Belle, Sarah Stanley's version of Romeo and Juliet, a 1993 outdoor production that received strong critical acclaim across the world.

== Personal life ==
Soo Garay was married to Stargate Atlantis star, British-born Canadian actor David Hewlett in November 2000. They divorced in February 2004. She speaks Hungarian fluently.

== Filmography ==
=== Film ===
| Year | Title | Role |
|---|---|---|
| 1988 | The Understudy: Graveyard Shift II | Script Girl |
| 1989 | A Whisper to a Scream | Mimi |
| 1990 | Outcast | Mother |
| 1996 | Hidden in America | Phoebe |
| 1996 | Devil's Food (1996) | Female Reporter |
| 1997 | A Prayer in the Dark | Rachel |
| 1998 | Shot Through the Heart | Amela |
| 1998 | Evidence of Blood | Maria |
| 1998 | Blues Brothers 2000 | Indiana State Trooper |
| 1999 | The Fall | Jo |
| 2000 | Ricky 6 | Sarah Portelance |
| 2000 | The Color of Friendship | Amanda |
| 2000 | Three Stories from the End of Everything | |
| 2001 | WW 3 | Patty |
| 2001 | A Colder Kind of Death | Sylvie Hargrave |
| 2003 | Foolproof | Hamish Receptionist |
| 2003 | Nothing | Little Girl's Mother |
| 2003 | Friday Night | Susan |
| 2004 | The Sadness of Johnson Joe Jangles | Clay Fantasia |
| 2005 | Martha: Behind Bars | Regina |
| 2005 | Hotel Babylon | Katia |
| 2006 | Aruba | Mom |
| 2008 | Adoration | Anna/Daughter |
| 2008 | Magic Flute Diaries | Journalist #1 |

=== Television ===
| Year | Title | Role | Notes |
|---|---|---|---|
| 1988 | Szomszédok | Valerie | 3 episodes |
| 1996–2000 | Psi Factor: Chronicles of the Paranormal | Dr. Claire Davison | 38 episodes |
| 1999 | Storm of the Century | Melinda Hatcher | |
| 1999 | La Femme Nikita | Valerie | episode, "Third Party Ripoff" |
| 2001–2003 | A Taste of Shakespeare | Lady Macbeth / Regan | 2 episodes |
| 2002–2004 | Puppets Who Kill | Thelma / Head of the PTA / Madame Zelda | 5 episodes |
| 2004 | Queer as Folk | Anna Sokowski | 2 episodes |
| 2005 | 1-800-Missing | | 2 episodes |
