= Steve Cosens =

Canadian cinematographer

Steve Cosens is a Canadian cinematographer. He is most noted as a two-time Genie Award nominee for Best Cinematography, receiving nominations at the 27th Genie Awards in 2007 for Snow Cake and at the 30th Genie Awards in 2010 for Nurse.Fighter.Boy, and a winner of the Canadian Screen Award for Best Photography in a Drama Series at the 6th Canadian Screen Awards in 2018 for Cardinal.

His other credits have included the films Ernest, The Uncles, The Art of Woo, Flower & Garnet, Seven Times Lucky, The Tracey Fragments, Citizen Gangster, Preggoland, Born to Be Blue, Mean Dreams, Blaze and Mafia Inc., and the television series The Zack Files, Show Me Yours and Durham County.
