= The Perfect Son =

- Directed by: Leonard Farlinger
- Written by: Leonard Farlinger
- Produced by: Jennifer Jonas
- Starring: Colm Feore; David Cubitt; Chandra West
- Cinematography: Barry Stone
- Edited by: Glenn Berman
- Music by: Ron Sures
- Production company: New Real Films
- Distributed by: Equinox Entertainment
- Release date: September 14, 2000 (TIFF)
- Running time: 92 minutes
- Country: Canada
- Language: English

The Perfect Son is a 2000 Canadian drama film written and directed by Leonard Farlinger. The film centres on Ryan (Colm Feore) and Theo (David Cubitt) Taylor, estranged brothers reunited by their father's death. Growing up, Ryan was the "perfect son" and Theo was the "black sheep" who struggled with drug addiction. When Ryan reveals that he is dying of AIDS, however, the brothers attempt to repair their relationship while Theo simultaneously tries to win back his ex-girlfriend Sarah (Chandra West).

The film premiered on September 14, 2000 in the Perspectives Canada stream at the Toronto International Film Festival.

== Production ==
The film was Farlinger's feature directorial debut. He wrote the script based on his own relationship with his older brother Brian Farlinger, who died of AIDS in 1995. He stated that he chose to cast Feore and Cubitt in part because their significantly different performance styles as actors helped to illuminate the film's themes of familial conflict.

The film was shot in Toronto in 1999, as the first film produced by Jennifer Jonas's New Real Films.

== Critical response ==
Peter Howell of the Toronto Star wrote that the movie was weak, but salvaged by Feore's and Cubitt's performances, while Katrina Onstad of the National Post called the film frustratingly slow-moving, but wrote that "just when I'd given up on this film -- I felt drowsy -- the final act of The Perfect Son kicked in, honest and emotional (a woman I was sitting near full- body sobbed)."

Marke Andrews of the Vancouver Sun reviewed the film more favourably, writing that although the film was not without problems, Farlinger and the lead actors had successfully rescued it from turning into the dreadful TV movie that a film with this premise could have become.

== Awards and nominations ==
Both Feore and Cubitt received Genie Award nominations for Best Actor at the 21st Genie Awards, although neither won.
