= Gerald L'Ecuyer =

Canadian film and television director (born 1959)

Gerald L'Ecuyer (born 1959) is a Canadian film and television director.

L'Ecuyer was born in Montreal. He studied at Marianopolis College in Montreal, before going to New York City, where he studied at the New School and worked for Andy Warhol's Interview. He returned to Montreal and studied cinema at Concordia University. He had a small role in David Lynch's television series Twin Peaks. He was a host of Imprint, a literary series on TVOntario. After years of working in Toronto and a brief second stint in New York, L'Ecuyer has returned to live in Montreal (2013) and works as an actor, director and writer. His credits include the films The Grace of God and Gerald L'Ecuyer: A Filmmaker's Journey, and the television series It's Me...Gerald. In these last two productions, L'Ecuyer, who is gay, plays a fictionalized version of himself: a young, gay, Canadian director.

He is the older brother of John L'Ecuyer, also a noted Canadian film and television director.
