= Marine Life (film) =

- Directed by: Anne Wheeler
- Written by: Robert Forsyth; Lori Lansens
- Based on: Marine Life by Linda Svendsen
- Produced by: Arvi Liimatainen; Jeanne Stromberg
- Starring: Cybill Shepherd; Peter Outerbridge; Alexandra Purvis
- Cinematography: David Pelletier
- Edited by: Alison Grace
- Music by: George Blondheim
- Production companies: Crescent Entertainment; Marine Life Productions
- Distributed by: Alliance Atlantis
- Release date: September 15, 2000 (TIFF)
- Running time: 95 minutes
- Country: Canada
- Language: English

Marine Life is a Canadian drama film, directed by Anne Wheeler and released in 2000. Based on the short story collection of the same name by Linda Svendsen, the film stars Cybill Shepherd as June, a jazz singer coping with feelings of failure in her career and her complicated relationships with her teenage daughter Adele (Alexandra Purvis) and her boyfriend Robert (Peter Outerbridge).

Shepherd agreed to take the role in part because she had been a fan of Wheeler's previous film Better Than Chocolate. The film's cast also includes Gabrielle Miller, Michael Hogan and Tyler Labine.

The film premiered at the 2000 Toronto International Film Festival.

The film received two Genie Award nominations at the 22nd Genie Awards in 2002, for Best Actor (Outerbridge) and Best Sound Editing (Gael MacLean, Jim Harrington, Patrick Haskill, Michael Keeping and Gina Mueller).
