= Red Deer Lake =

Red Deer Lake may refer to:

- Red Deer Lake (Alberta) located in Alberta, Canada.
- Red Deer Lake (Medicine Hat, Alberta) located at 50° 17' 43" N 110° 24' 31" W near Medicine Hat in Alberta, Canada.
- Red Deer Lake (Priddis, Alberta) located at 50° 52' 21" N 114° 9' 35" W near Priddis in Alberta, Canada.
- Red Deer Lake (Manitoba) located in Manitoba, Canada.
- Red Deer Lake (Kenora, Ontario) located at 50° 01' 29" N 94° 09' 42" W near Kenora in Ontario, Canada.
- Red Deer Lake (Sudbury, Ontario) located at 47° 12' 30" N 81° 36' 02" W near Sudbury in Ontario, Canada.
- Red Deer Lake (Matheson, Ontario) located at 48° 40' 13" N 80° 01' 56" W near Matheson in Ontario, Canada.
- Red Deer Lake (Wahnapitae, Ontario), Canada located at 46° 24' 20" N 80° 43' 11" W near Wahnapitae in Ontario, Canada.
