= Ernest (film) =

- Directed by: Keith Behrman
- Written by: Keith Behrman
- Produced by: Natalie Hoban
- Starring: David Reale; Frank Moore
- Cinematography: Steve Cosens
- Edited by: Marlo Miazga
- Music by: Colin Aguiar
- Production company: Canadian Film Centre
- Distributed by: Taxi Entertainment
- Release date: September 12, 2000 (TIFF)
- Running time: 22 minutes
- Country: Canada
- Language: English

Ernest is a Canadian comedy short film, directed by Keith Behrman and released in 2000. A satire of conservative rhetoric about "common sense", the film stars David Reale as Ernest, a young man who is forced by his father (Frank Moore) to keep financial statements detailing every penny he spends out of his allowance, and is driven to steal a basketball to balance the books when his father demands an audit.

The cast also includes Holly Dennison, Dan Chameroy, John Dewey, Rick Braggins, Veronica Miles, Lauren Miles, Shimmy Silverman, Courtenay Betts, Andrea Burgie, Tim Dorsch and Nelson Moutinho in supporting roles.

The film premiered at the 2000 Toronto International Film Festival, where it received an honorable mention from the Best Canadian Short Film jury.
