= Nicholas Kendall (director) =

British-born Canadian film and television director (born 1949)

Nicholas Kendall (born April 25, 1949) is a Canadian film and television director from Vancouver, British Columbia.

Born in Manchester, England, he moved to Canada with his family, including brother Simon Kendall, in childhood.

He began his career making documentary films, releasing Do It with Joy in 1977, The Lost Pharaoh: The Search for Akhenaten in 1980, and Rape: Face to Face in 1983. He founded the film production company Meta Communications Group, but sold it to International Movie Group in 1989.

He directed the television film Paper Route, and episodes of the television series The Beachcombers, Danger Bay, Neon Rider and The Adventures of the Black Stallion, before his narrative feature film debut, Cadillac Girls, was released in 1993. The film was a nominee for the Claude Jutra Award in 1993, and Kendall's brother Simon won the Genie Award for Best Original Score at the 14th Genie Awards.

He subsequently also directed the films Kayla (1998), Mr. Rice's Secret (2000) and Goose on the Loose (2006), but concentrated primarily on television directing.

He has also been a film studies instructor at Capilano University.

== Filmography ==
=== Films ===
- Do It with Joy - 1977
- Cadillac Girls - 1993
- Kayla - 1998
- Mr. Rice's Secret - 2000
- Goose on the Loose - 2006

=== Television ===
- The Lost Pharaoh: The Search for Akhenaten - 1980
- Rape: Face to Face - 1983
- The Beachcombers - 1989, one episode
- Danger Bay - 1990, two episodes
- The Adventures of the Black Stallion - 1991–92, four episodes
- Neon Rider - 1993, one episode
- Liberty Street - 1995, one episode
- ReBoot - 1995, one episode
- Kerrisdale High - 1994–95, two episodes
- Beast Wars: Transformers - 1996, one episode
- The New Addams Family - 1999, four episodes
- Caitlin's Way - 2000, one episode
- Mentors - 2000, one episode
- Just Deal - 2000, one episode
- MythQuest - 2001, two episodes
- Beyond Belief: Fact or Fiction - 2002, eight episodes
- FBI: Negotiator - 2005, television film
