= Arto Paragamian =

Canadian film director and writer

- Born: Montreal, Quebec, Canada
- Occupations: Film director, screenwriter
- Years active: 1993–present

Arto Paragamian is a Canadian film director and writer, known for his films Because Why (1993), Cosmos (1996) and Two Thousand and None (2000).

As a student at the Mel Hoppenheim School of Cinema at Concordia University, Paragamian won the Norman McLaren Award (at the time the top Canadian student film prize) at the Canadian Student Film Festival for two consecutive years with A Fish Story (1987), and Across the Street (1988).
