= Keith Behrman =

Canadian film director

Keith Behrman (born April 1, 1963, in Shaunavon, Saskatchewan) is a Canadian film and television director and writer, who won the Claude Jutra Award in 2003 for his debut film Flower & Garnet.

Behrman also won the Vancouver International Film Festival's Telefilm Canada Award for best emerging Western Canadian feature film director in 2002, and the film was named to the Toronto International Film Festival's annual Canada's Top Ten list for 2002.

His second feature film, Giant Little Ones, premiered in 2018.

Behrman also wrote and directed the short films Thomas, White Cloud, Blue Mountain, Ernest and Cape Breton Highlands, and has directed episodes of the television series Da Vinci's Inquest, Godiva's, This Is Wonderland, and The Stagers.
