= Red Deer (film) =

- Directed by: Anthony Couture
- Written by: Anthony Couture
- Produced by: Anthony Couture; Derek Mack
- Starring: Awaovieyi Agie; Loreya Montayne; Amber Rothwell; Kurt Max Runte; James Hutson; Joe Procyk
- Cinematography: Kevin Hall
- Edited by: Gus Halliway
- Music by: Damon Henry; Andrew Herfst; Ida Nilsen; Tygh Runyan; Stefan Udell
- Production company: Four by Four Films
- Release date: September 13, 2000 (TIFF)
- Running time: 84 minutes
- Country: Canada
- Language: English

Red Deer is a Canadian drama film, directed by Anthony Couture and released in 2000. Set in Red Deer, Alberta, the film centres on two visitors to the city and their interactions with a group of local residents.

Otavie (Awaovieyi Agie) and Carol (Loreya Montayne) both check into a motel around the same time. Otavie befriends Sarah (Amber Rothwell), but becomes suspected of a crime by her father Jerry (Kurt Max Runte) and boyfriend David (James Hutson) when she unexpectedly runs away; Carol takes a job as a phone sex operator, and develops something of a relationship with Nigel (Joe Procyk), the lonely owner of a local bookstore.

Couture, a native of Red Deer, made the film as his masters thesis while studying filmmaking at the University of British Columbia.

The film premiered at the 2000 Toronto International Film Festival, where it received an honorable mention from the Best Canadian First Feature Film jury.
