= Michael Downing (director) =

Canadian film director and screenwriter

Michael Downing is a Canadian film director and screenwriter. He is most noted as director of two Genie Award nominees for Best Live Action Short Drama, receiving nods for Clean Rite Cowboy at the 21st Genie Awards in 2001 and for Why Don't You Dance? at the 24th Genie Awards in 2004.

A former dancer and a graduate of the film program at Ryerson University, Downing began his film career making dance films for the National Ballet of Canada. He subsequently received a scholarship to study at the American Film Institute; during his studies there, he and Philip Svoboda won a bronze medal from the Student Academy Awards in 2003 for their short film Fine.

He now works predominantly as a director of television commercials, although he has two films, The Threeway and a feature version of Clean Rite Cowboy, in development.
