= 2004 Toronto International Film Festival =

Annual Canadian film festival

- Festival poster
- Opening film: Being Julia
- Closing film: 5x2
- Location: Toronto, Ontario, Canada
- Hosted by: Toronto International Film Festival Group
- No. of films: 328 films
- Festival date: September 9, 2004–September 18, 2004
- Language: English
- Website: tiff.net
- 2005 2003

The 29th Toronto International Film Festival ran from September 9 through September 18. The festival screened 328 films of which 253 were features and 75 were shorts (148 of the films screened were in a language other than English).

== Awards ==
Award	Film	Director
People's Choice Award	Hotel Rwanda	Terry George
Discovery Award	Omagh	Pete Travis
Best Canadian Feature Film	It's All Gone Pete Tong	Michael Dowse
Best Canadian Feature Film – Special Jury Citation	Scared Sacred	Velcrow Ripper
Best Canadian First Feature Film	White Skin	Daniel Roby
Best Canadian Short Film	Man. Feel. Pain.	Dylan Akio Smith
FIPRESCI International Critics' Award	In My Father's Den	Brad McGann

No first or second runners-up were officially named for the People's Choice Award; however, festival director Piers Handling did provide the media with a list of numerous other films that had been in the running, including Crash, Gunner Palace, I, Claudia, Up and Down, 3-Iron, Ma Mère, The Holy Girl, Red Dust, Brides, Saving Face and Sideways.

== Programme ==
=== Canada First ===
- CQ2 (Seek You Too) (Carole Laure)
- I, Claudia (Chris Abraham)
- Ill Fated (Mark A. Lewis)
- It's All Gone Pete Tong (Michael Dowse)
- Jimmywork (Simon Sauvé)
- Phil the Alien (Rob Stefaniuk)
- Saint Ralph (Michael McGowan)
- Seven Times Lucky (Gary Yates)
- Tideline (Littoral) (Wajdi Mouawad)
- White Skin (Daniel Roby)

=== Canadian Open Vault ===
- The Rowdyman (Peter Carter)

=== Canadian Retrospective ===
- Attiuk — René Bonnière
- Land Without Trees, or the Mouchouânipi (Le Pays de la terre sans arbre ou le Mouchouânipi) — Pierre Perrault
- Pour la suite du monde — Pierre Perrault, Michel Brault
- The River Schooners (Les Voitures d'eau) — Pierre Perrault
- The Shimmering Beast (La bête lumineuse) — Pierre Perrault
- The Times That Are (Le Règne du jour) — Pierre Perrault
- Wake Up, mes bons amis (Un Pays sans bon sens!) — Pierre Perrault
- Whalehead (Tête-à-la-Baleine) — René Bonnière
- Winter Crossing at l'Isle-aux-Coudres (La Traversée d'hiver à l'Île aux Coudres) — Réne Bonnière

=== Contemporary World Cinema ===
- 3-Iron (Kim Ki-duk)
- After the Day Before (Attila Janisch)
- Almost Brothers (Lúcia Murat)
- The Alzheimer Case (Erik Van Looy)
- Antares (Götz Spielmann)
- As Follows (Federico Veiroj)
- BOMBÓN – El Perro (Carlos Sorín)
- Breaking News (Johnnie To)
- Brodeuses (Eléonore Faucher)
- Brothers (Susanne Bier)
- Cool (Theo van Gogh)
- Crónicas (Sebastián Cordero)
- Days and Hours (Pjer Žalica)
- Dead Man's Shoes (Shane Meadows)
- Dear Frankie (Shona Auerbach)
- Duck Season (Fernando Eimbcke)
- Earth and Ashes (Atiq Rahimi)
- L'Équipier (Philippe Lioret)
- La Femme de Gilles (Frédéric Fonteyne)
- Ferpect Crime (Álex de la Iglesia)
- Hidden Flaws (Paula van der Oest)
- The Holy Girl (Lucrecia Martel)
- Hotel (Jessica Hausner)
- The Keys to the House (Gianni Amelio)
- Ils se marièrent et eurent beaucoup d'enfants (Yvan Attal)
- Inconscientes (Joaquín Oristrell)
- Innocent Voices (Luis Mandoki)
- Lila dit ça (Ziad Doueiri)
- The Limb Salesman (Anais Granofsky)
- Little Sky (María Victoria Menis)
- Ma Mère (Christophe Honoré)
- Male Fantasy (Blaine Thurier)
- Mon père est ingénieur (Robert Guédiguian)
- My Summer of Love (Paweł Pawlikowski)
- Mysterious Skin (Gregg Araki)
- Niceland (Fridrik Thor Fridriksson)
- Nobody Knows (Hirokazu Koreeda)
- Oldboy (Park Chan-wook)
- Our Own (Dmitry Meskhiyev)
- Plastic Flowers (Liu Bingjian)
- Quill (Yoichi Sai)
- Real Life (Panos Koutras)
- Rois et reine (Arnaud Desplechin)
- Rolling Family (Pablo Trapero)
- Shiza (Gulshat Omarova)
- Siblings (David Weaver)
- Somersault (Cate Shortland)
- Spider Forest (Song Il-gon)
- Stray Dogs (Marzieh Meshkini)
- The Tuner (Kira Muratova)
- Turtles Can Fly (Bahman Ghobadi)
- Two Great Sheep (Liu Hao)
- Up and Down (Jan Hřebejk)
- Walk on Water (Eytan Fox)
- Whisky (Juan Pablo Rebella, Pablo Stoll)
- Wilby Wonderful (Daniel MacIvor)
- The Woodsman (Nicole Kassell)
- The World (Jia Zhangke)

=== Dialogues: Talking with Pictures ===
- The Brood (David Cronenberg)
- Diary of a Country Priest (Robert Bresson)
- Heaven's Gate (Michael Cimino)
- La Noire De... (Ousmane Sembène)
- Sweet Smell of Success (Alexander Mackendrick)
- This Sporting Life (Lindsay Anderson)
- Withnail and I (Bruce Robinson)

=== Discovery ===
- Astronauts (Santi Amodeo)
- Automne (Ra'up McGee)
- Boats out of Watermelon Rinds (Ahmet Uluçay)
- The Buffalo Boy (Minh Nguyen-Vô)
- Le Cou de la girafe (Safy Nebbou)
- Crying? (Alexander Voulgaris)
- Electric Shadows (Xiao Jiang)
- The Forest for the Trees (Maren Ade)
- Hari Om (Bharatbala)
- Harvest Time (Marina Razbezhkina)
- In My Father's Den (Brad McGann)
- Innocence (Lucile Hadžihalilović)
- Mirage (Svetozar Ristovski)
- Off Beat (Hendrik Hölzemann)
- Omagh (Pete Travis)
- On the Outs (Lori Silverbush, Michael Skolnik)
- The Overture (Itthi-sunthorn Wichailak)
- Oyster Farmer (Anna Reeves)
- Private (Saverio Costanzo)
- Producing Adults (Aleksi Salmenperä)
- Les Revenants (Robin Campillo)
- Saving Face (Alice Wu)
- Summer Storm (Marco Kreuzpaintner)
- Symmetry (Konrad Niewolski)
- Uno (Aksel Hennie)
- Vento di Terra (Vincenzo Marra)
- A Way of Life (Amma Asante)
- Whisky Romeo Zulu (Enrique Piñeyro)

=== Masters ===
- 10 on Ten (Abbas Kiarostami)
- 10e Chambre, instants d'audiences (Raymond Depardon)
- À tout de suite (Benoît Jacquot)
- Bad Education (Pedro Almodóvar)
- Brides (Pantelis Voulgaris)
- Café Lumière (Hou Hsiao-hsien)
- Chased by Dreams (Buddhadeb Dasgupta)
- Cinévardaphoto (Agnès Varda)
- Demain on déménage (Chantal Akerman)
- Eros (Wong Kar-wai, Steven Soderbergh, Michelangelo Antonioni)
- Five (Abbas Kiarostami)
- Human Touch (Paul Cox)
- Land of Plenty (Wim Wenders)
- Low Life (Im Kwon-taek)
- Midwinter Night's Dream (Goran Paskaljević)
- Moolaadé (Ousmane Sembène)
- The Ninth Day (Volker Schlöndorff)
- Notre Musique (Jean-Luc Godard)
- Salvador Allende (Patricio Guzmán)
- Sucker Free City (Spike Lee)
- Trilogy: The Weeping Meadow (Theodoros Angelopoulos)

=== Midnight Madness ===
- Calvaire (Fabrice du Welz)
- Creep (Christopher Smith)
- Dead Birds (Alex Turner)
- Ghost in the Shell 2: Innocence (Mamoru Oshii)
- Kontroll (Nimród Antal)
- The Machinist (Brad Anderson)
- Rahtree: Flower of the Night (Yuthlert Sippapak)
- The Raspberry Reich (Bruce LaBruce)
- Saw (James Wan)
- Zebraman (Takashi Miike)

=== National Cinema Program ===
- Cape of Good Hope (Mark Bamford)
- Drum (Zola Maseko)
- Forgiveness (Ian Gabriel)
- Max and Mona (Teddy Mattera)
- Mozart - The Music of the Violin (Mickey Madoda Dube)
- A South African Love Story - Walter and Albertina Sisulu (Toni Strasburg)
- Zulu Love Letter (Ramadan Suleman)

=== Planet Africa ===
- Aïcha (Newton I. Aduaka)
- above & beneath (René Alberta)
- Bullet Boy (Saul Dibb)
- Gardiens de la Mémoire (Eric Kabera)
- Le Grand Voyage (Ismaël Ferroukhi)
- The Hero (Zézé Gamboa)
- Kounandi (Apolline Traoré)
- La Nuit de la vérité (Fanta Régina Nacro)
- Off Duty (Buboo Kakati)
- On the Verge of a Fever (Le Goût des jeunes filles) (John L'Ecuyer)
- One Flight Stand (Saladin Patterson)
- A Spoonful of Sugar (Andrea Williams)
- Time Out (Xelinda Yancy)

=== Real to Reel ===
- Andrew and Jeremy Get Married (Don Boyd)
- Be Here to Love Me: A Film About Townes Van Zandt (Margaret Brown)
- Casuistry: The Art of Killing a Cat (Zev Asher)
- Darwin's Nightmare (Hubert Sauper)
- Double Dare (Amanda Micheli)
- Le Fantôme d'Henri Langlois (Jacques Richard)
- Final Cut: The Making and Unmaking of Heaven's Gate (Michael Epstein)
- Going Upriver: The Long War of John Kerry (George T. Butler)
- Gunner Palace (Michael Tucker, Petra Epperlein)
- I Died in Childhood... (Georgy Paradjanov)
- Kings of the Sky (Deborah Stratman)
- The Last Victory (John Appel)
- Letters to Ali (Clara Law)
- Lightning in a Bottle (Antoine Fuqua)
- Mondovino (Jonathan Nossiter)
- Scared Sacred (Velcrow Ripper)
- Shake Hands with the Devil: The Journey of Roméo Dallaire (Peter Raymont)
- Small Mall (Róbert Ingi Douglas)
- Tell Them Who You Are (Mark S. Wexler)
- Three of Hearts: A Postmodern Family (Susan Kaplan)
- Touch the Sound (Thomas Riedelsheimer)
- Unforgivable Blackness: The Rise and Fall of Jack Johnson (Ken Burns)
- A Whale of a Tale (Peter Lynch)
- White Tower (Su Qing, Mina)
- Writer of O (Pola Rapaport)
- The Year of the Yao (James D. Stern, Adam Del Deo)
- Z Channel: A Magnificent Obsession (Xan Cassavetes)

=== Short Cuts Canada ===
- The Accordion (Accordéon) (Michèle Cournoyer)
- Almost Forgot My Bones (Katrin Bowen)
- Between Science and Garbage (Pierre Hébert, Bob Ostertag)
- Birdlings Two (Davina Pardo)
- Black Ink on Blue Sky (Encre noire sur fond d'azur) (Félix Dufour-Laperrière)
- Boyclops (Jay Dahl)
- The Bridge (Le Pont) (Guy Édoin)
- Build (Greg Atkins)
- choke. (David Hyde)
- Corps étrangers (Simon Lavoie)
- Desastre (Jay Field)
- Deux Enfants qui fument (Sarah Fortin)
- Elephant Shoe (Christopher Behnisch)
- Elliot Smelliot (Anita Doron)
- Filth (Wrik Mead)
- The Finite (Alexi Manis)
- Girl Cleans Sink (Sook-Yin Lee)
- Groomed (Joseph Raso)
- The Hill (Deborah Chow)
- Hogtown Blues (Hugh Gibson)
- Hotel Saudade (Cameron Bailey)
- The Human Kazoo (Fabrizio Filippo)
- Man. Feel. Pain. (Dylan Akio Smith)
- mary/me (Kelly Egan)
- Milo 55160 (David Ostry)
- More Sensitive (Gail Noonan)
- Mothers, Fathers and Other Strangers (Carl Knutson)
- My Old Man (Alex Levine)
- Pigeon (Anthony Green)
- Rodéo (Mélanie Dion)
- Ryan (Chris Landreth)
- The Sadness of Johnson Joe Jangles (Jeffrey St. Jules)
- Sissy Boy Slap Party (Guy Maddin)
- Sombra Dolorosa (Guy Maddin)
- Stronger (Debra Felstead)
- Superhero Wannabe (Patricia Harris Seeley)
- A Tale of Bad Luck (Brad Peyton)
- Trouser Accidents (Semi Chellas)
- white out (Matt Sinclair-Foreman)

=== Special Presentations ===
- 5x2 (Cinq fois deux) (François Ozon)
- The Assassination of Richard Nixon (Niels Mueller)
- Bluebird (Mijke de Jong)
- Childstar (Don McKellar)
- Les Choristes (Christophe Barratier)
- Crash (Paul Haggis)
- A Dirty Shame (John Waters)
- Enduring Love (Roger Michell)
- The General (Buster Keaton, Clyde Bruckman)
- Haven (Frank E. Flowers)
- Head in the Clouds (John Duigan)
- Hotel Rwanda (Terry George)
- Isn't This a Time! A Tribute Concert for Harold Leventhal (Jim Brown)
- Keane (Lodge Kerrigan)
- Kung Fu Hustle (Stephen Chow)
- Ladies in Lavender (Charles Dance)
- The Libertine (Laurence Dunmore)
- The Merchant of Venice (Michael Radford)
- Millions (Danny Boyle)
- Noel (Chazz Palminteri)
- P.S. (Dylan Kidd)
- Palindromes (Todd Solondz)
- Promised Land (Amos Gitaï)
- The Sea Inside (Alejandro Amenábar)
- Shadows of Time (Florian Gallenberger)
- Sideways (Alexander Payne)
- Silver City (John Sayles)
- Steamboy (Katsuhiro Otomo)
- Throw Down (Johnnie To)
- When Will I Be Loved (James Toback)
- Yes (Sally Potter)
- Yesterday (Darrell James Roodt)

=== Special events ===
- Celebrating Brian Linehan — Live tribute event at the Winter Garden Theatre to Canadian entertainment journalist and interviewer Brian Linehan, following his death earlier in 2004. Hosted by Roger Ebert, with celebrity guests including Martin Short.

=== Viacom Galas ===
- Arsène Lupin (Jean-Paul Salomé)
- Being Julia (István Szabó)
- Beyond the Sea (Kevin Spacey)
- Clean (Olivier Assayas)
- Der Untergang (Downfall) (Oliver Hirschbiegel)
- Five Children and It (John Stephenson)
- A Good Woman (Mike Barker)
- House of Flying Daggers (Zhang Yimou)
- I Heart Huckabees (David O. Russell)
- Imaginary Heroes (Dan Harris)
- An Italian Romance (Carlo Mazzacurati)
- Jiminy Glick in Lalawood (Vadim Jean)
- Kinsey (Bill Condon)
- Modigliani (Mick Davis)
- The Motorcycle Diaries (Walter Salles)
- Ray (Taylor Hackford)
- Red Dust (Tom Hooper)
- Return to Sender (Bille August)
- Shark Tale (Vicky Jenson, Bibo Bergeron, Rob Letterman)
- Stage Beauty (Richard Eyre)

=== Visions ===
- 9 Songs (Michael Winterbottom)
- A Hole in My Heart (Lukas Moodysson)
- Acapulco Gold (André Forcier)
- Anatomie de l'enfer (Catherine Breillat)
- Art Project: Role Play
- Blood (Jerry Ciccoritti)
- Días de Santiago (Josué Méndez)
- Evolution of a Filipino Family (Lav Diaz)
- The Heart Is Deceitful Above All Things (Asia Argento)
- I Like It a Lot (Jay Rosenblatt)
- L'Intrus (Claire Denis)
- A Letter to True (Bruce Weber)
- The Love Crimes of Gillian Guess (Bruce McDonald)
- Los Muertos (Lisandro Alonso)
- Primer (Shane Carruth)
- Tarnation (Jonathan Caouette)
- Thème (Je Françoise Romand)
- Trauma (Marc Evans)
- Tropical Malady (Apichatpong Weerasethakul)
- Undertow (David Gordon Green)
- Vital (Shinya Tsukamoto)
- ZERO the inside story (Elida Schogt)
- SMARTERCHILD (SPLEAK)

=== Wavelengths ===
- ( ) (Morgan Fisher)
- --- ------ (a.k.a. Short Line Long Line) (Thom Andersen, Malcolm Brodwick)
- Anaconda Targets (Dominic Angerame)
- Ber-Lin 99/00 (André Lehmann)
- Bouquets 26-27 (Rose Lowder)
- Chateau/Poyet (Larry Jordan)
- Concerning Flight: Five Illuminations in Miniature (Charlotte Pryce)
- Daylight Moon (A Quartet) (Lewis Klahr)
- Enid's Idyll (Larry Jordan)
- Le Fantôme de l'opératrice (Caroline Martel)
- Flushing Meadows (Joseph Cornell)
- Free To Go (Interlude) (Andrew Noren)
- Golden Gate Bridge Exposure: Poised for Parabolas (Lynn Marie Kirby)
- It's Not My Memory of It - Three Recollected Documents (Julia Meltzer, David Thorne)
- Line Describing a Cone (Anthony McCall)
- Mirror (Matthias Müller, Christoph Girardet)
- Mouths of Ash (Juan Manuel Echavarría)
- The Observatory (Alexi Manis)
- Phantom (Matthias Müller)
- Play (Matthias Müller, Christoph Girardet)
- Rose Hobart (Joseph Cornell)
- Skagafjördur (Peter Hutton)
- St. Ignatius Church Exposure: Lenten Light Conversions (Lynn Marie Kirby)
- Terrace 49 (Janie Geiser)
- Williamsburg, Brooklyn (Jonas Mekas)

== Canada's Top Ten ==
The festival's year-end Canada's Top Ten list was announced in December.

- Childstar — Don McKellar
- The Five of Us (Elles étaient cinq) — Ghyslaine Côté
- I, Claudia — Chris Abraham
- It's All Gone Pete Tong — Michael Dowse
- Ryan — Chris Landreth
- Saint Ralph — Michael McGowan
- Scared Sacred — Velcrow Ripper
- Shake Hands with the Devil: The Journey of Roméo Dallaire — Peter Raymont
- What Remains of Us (Ce qu'il reste de nous) — François Prévost, Hugo Latulippe
- White Skin (La Peau blanche) — Daniel Roby

== Top 10 Canadian Films of All Time ==
In 2004 a new Top 10 Canadian Films of All Time list was made, an exercise previously carried out in 1984 and 1993.

Rank	Title	Year	Director
1	Mon oncle Antoine	1971	Claude Jutra
2	Jesus of Montreal	1989	Denys Arcand
3	Goin' Down the Road	1970	Don Shebib
4	The Sweet Hereafter	1997	Atom Egoyan
5	Atanarjuat: The Fast Runner	2002	Zacharias Kunuk
6	Dead Ringers	1988	David Cronenberg
7	Good Riddance (Les Bons débarras)	1980	Francis Mankiewicz
8	Orders (Les Ordres)	1974	Michel Brault
9	The Decline of the American Empire	1986	Denys Arcand
10	The Barbarian Invasions	2003	Denys Arcand
