= Joseph Cornell filmography =

American artist Joseph Cornell (1903–1972) is best known for his boxes which constitute a singular contribution to the Surrealist canon and to the art of assemblage. However, he also pursued experimental film-making as an amateur beginning in the 1930s. Cornell was the principal pioneer of collage films in a purely artistic sense and, although the introduction of his films into the public forum was relatively late compared to when they were made, his work as a filmmaker has been widely influential.

== History ==
Joseph Cornell began to collect films on 16mm in the 1920s, mainly to entertain his mother and disabled brother at the family home in Queens, where Cornell lived for two thirds of his life. To vary the program and to surprise his family, Cornell began to alter his films slightly by adding shots, or changing the endings to films with which they were familiar. This led, in time, to his first and most elaborate film collage, Rose Hobart (1936), coincidentally concurrent with his first box, Soap Bubble Set (1936), later sold to the Museum of Modern Art in New York. Recently discovered correspondence between Cornell and Iris Barry of MoMA's film library reveals that he was already conversant with language relevant to the then emerging field of film preservation and was also occasionally collecting films in 35mm nitrate.

The first screening of Rose Hobart at the Museum's Julien Levy Gallery in 1936 led to a violent conflict with Surrealist painter Salvador Dalí, who accused Cornell of stealing his ideas. Cornell, who was naturally shy, was deeply affected by this incident and seldom showed his films afterward. Apart from a special screening held at a Christmas party at the New York Public Library in 1957, these were usually given in connection with regular art gallery showings of his boxes; even today they are most often seen in connection with exhibits of static visual work, although Cornell disclaimed any relationship between these two aspects of his endeavors.

After a long break from film-making starting at about the beginning of World War II, Cornell resumed work in this area in the mid-1950s. Rather than using found footage, Cornell began to work with collaborators, cameras and some actors, making films with Rudy Burckhardt, the young Stan Brakhage and finally Larry Jordan, who completed six of Cornell's earlier films at the artist's request, in addition to making a new version of A Fable for Fountains (1957) retitled A Legend for Fountains (1965). About 1961, Cornell stopped his film-making activity and production of new boxes, devoting himself to repairing boxes already made, a return to 2-D collage, completing films already made and the production of one more film.

In 1969, Cornell donated his film collection, consisting of some 150 reels, to the Anthology Film Archives in New York. Although the collection consisted mainly of entertainment films distributed to the home market in the 1920s and 1930s, a few additional reels were discovered that appeared to constitute previously unknown projects, but Cornell's declining health in his last years and his subsequent death in 1972 prevented him from being asked about specific intentions in regard to most of them. He did leave extensive notes relating to some of these films; and these have been used to help complete certain titles. In some cases, titles—such as Thimble Theater—were devised to identify films that had none. Cornell may have worked on as many as 30 or more films, but it is difficult to tell in some cases whether a reel's contents constitutes an actual assemblage or is merely a collection of trims; scholars generally agree that the 27 titles listed below constitute actual projects. The provenance of The Children's Jury is more difficult to establish, and therefore it is regarded as "attributed" to Cornell.

The first detailed appreciation of Cornell's film-making activity in print was an article by Jonas Mekas, "The Invisible Cathedrals of Joseph Cornell," published in the Village Voice in 1970. Screenings of Cornell's films on a regular and semi-regular basis began from that time. Anthology Film Archives maintains two programs of Cornell's films as part of its rotating Essential Cinema series; they have been widely seen in film series and as part of traveling exhibitions and collected onto the DVDs shown below. TCM's airing of Rose Hobart in 2008 represented the first major showing of a Joseph Cornell film on television.

== Dating ==
Cornell did not date his films, and dating them accurately has proven a persistent problem; as much of it involved found film that was already old -- Rose Hobart, for example, was derived from a "junk" 16mm print of the 1931 feature East of Borneo—there is little internal evidence as to when he may have been involved in a particular project. Rose Hobart is dated by virtue of its Julian Levy Gallery screening, but that does not exclude the possibility that Cornell may have made changes in it, or any other film that he made, some time later. Scholarly consensus shows that Cornell made his films in two basic batches; the collage films were made between 1936 and roughly the beginning of World War II or slightly after, and the second, "photographic" phase between 1954 and 1965. In the list below, the convention of "1940s" developed by Anthology Film Archives in observed for the earlier films, though with the understanding that the late 1930s is more likely. In recent times, a date of 1938 is associated specifically with the films in The Children's Trilogy.

== Style and influence ==
Cornell's style is remarkably consistent among his collage and photographic films, and although he discouraged drawing a parallel between them and his visual art the harmony in approach is obvious. Surrealist juxtapositions between shots abound, much as disparate objects exist side by side within his boxes, and the result is often amusing even if one cannot divine why. In contrast to the rapid fire montage of later filmmakers in the collage medium, such as Bruce Conner and Stan Vanderbeek, Cornell's pace is slow, even "cool," and helped to keep his films different and fresh even as they were not widely seen until after 1970. Cornell made his films primarily to entertain himself and his family; not showing them publicly left Cornell free to develop his own methods independently of trends observed among other experimental filmmakers of his time. Cornell was a direct influence on Brakhage and Jordan, Ken Jacobs and Jack Smith. Avant-garde filmmakers of a later era, such as Jeanne Liotta—who has authored an extensive essay on Cornell—Lewis Klahr, Janie Geiser, Stephanie Barber and Brian Frye claim Cornell as a major influence on their work.

Several of Cornell's titles share footage, and some represent alternative views of the same project. Cloche a Travers les Feuilles is a shorter, variant version of Nymphlight with the Debussy piece of that name added as a soundtrack. The footage in The Children's Trilogy is all of a related kind, and repetition is an important technique in this cycle, with a shot of a child falling asleep repeated several times in The Children's Party. Gnir Rednow is an alternate reading of Stan Brakhage's The Wonder Ring (1955) which Cornell "commissioned" with the gift of two bus tokens; it is so close to Brakhage's film some suggested that it was no more than The Wonder Ring played backwards, but analysis reveals that the two films share no common shots, and that Cornell worked only with the trims.

Few of Cornell's films have dedicated soundtracks; the standard soundtrack to Rose Hobart consists of an album of Latin music which Cornell once used, and even that was an arbitrary replacement for the 78 rpm records he utilized in the 1930s. While the soundtrack for Rose Hobart has a distancing and dissonant effect in combination with the film, the Beethoven symphony Cornell chose for Carousel -- Animal Opera deepens its sense of tragedy. Unfortunately, he didn't leave many notes in regard to what kinds of sound that he wanted to use with his films, and never made a synchronized track to any of them himself. Lawrence Jordan was able to complete the soundtrack to Jack's Dream around 1970, working from instructions from Cornell himself, and some accompaniments were commissioned by Anthology's Bruce Posner for the Unseen Cinema DVD set and its touring version as well. But the vast majority of Cornell's films are shown without sound.

== Complete filmography ==
All films made originally in 16mm. Format is title, date, running time, color/b&w and silent/sound (when known), name of collaborator.

- Rose Hobart (1936) 19m, color, sound
- The Children's Jury (ca. 1938) attributed to Joseph Cornell
- The Children's Trilogy:
- Cotillion (1940s-1969) 8m b&w, silent
- The Midnight Party (1940s-1969) 3m b&w, silent
- The Children's Party (1940s-1969) 8m b&w, silent
- Carousel—Animal Opera (1940s) 6m, b&w, sound added by Larry Jordan
- Thimble Theater (1940s)
- Jack's Dream (1940s-ca. 1972) b&w, sound added by Larry Jordan
- Bookstalls (1940s) 6m b&w, silent
- Vaudeville De-Luxe (1940s) 12m, b&w, silent
- By Night With Torch and Spear (1940s- ca. 1972) 8m, b&w, silent
- New York—Rome—Barcelona—Brussels (1940s) 10m, b&w, silent
- Cinderella's Dream (no date) 3m, color, silent
- The Aviary (1955) 11m, b&w, silent
- Centuries of June (1955) 11m, color, silent, Stan Brakhage
- Joanne, Union Square (1955) 7m, b&w, silent
- Joanne, Xmas (ca. 1955) 2m, color, silent
- Gnir Rednow (1955-1960 or 1970) 5m, color, silent, Stan Brakhage
- A Fable for Fountains (1955-1957) b&w, sound, Rudy Burckhardt
- Nymphlight (1957) 7m, color, silent
- Cloches à travers les Feuilles - Claude Debussy (1957) 4m, color, sound
- Angel (1957) 3m, color, silent
- Cappuccino (1957)
- Children (1957) 8m, b&w, silent
- Boy's Games (1957) 5m, b&w, silent
- Mulberry Street (1957-1965) 9m, b&w, silent Rudy Burckhardt
- A Legend for Fountains (1957, 1965) Rudy Burckhardt, Larry Jordan
- Flushing Meadows (1965) 8m, Larry Jordan

=== Cornell-related subjects ===
- The Wonder Ring (1955) 6m, color, silent directed by Stan Brakhage
- What Mozart Saw on Mulberry Street (1956) 6m, b&w, sound directed by Rudy Burckhardt
- Cornell, 1965 (1979) 9m, color, directed by Larry Jordan

=== Larry Jordan compilations ===
- Three by Cornell: Cotillion, Children's Party, Midnight Party

available in 16mm through Canyon Cinema

- Three More by Cornell: Carrousel, Jack's Dream, Thimble Theatre

available in 16mm through Canyon Cinema

=== Cornell films on DVD ===
- The Magical Worlds of Joseph Cornell
- Unseen Cinema: Early American Avant Garde Film 1894-1941 contains: The Children’s Jury, Thimble Theater, Carousel: Animal Opera, Jack’s Dream, The Children’s Party, Cotillion and The Midnight Party.
- Treasures from American Film Archives: Encore Edition

== See also ==
- Rose Hobart (film)
- Flushing Meadows (film)
- Salvador Dalí
- Experimental film
- Collage
- Stan Brakhage
- Found footage
- Larry Jordan
