= Georges Renavent =

American actor and film director (1892–1969)

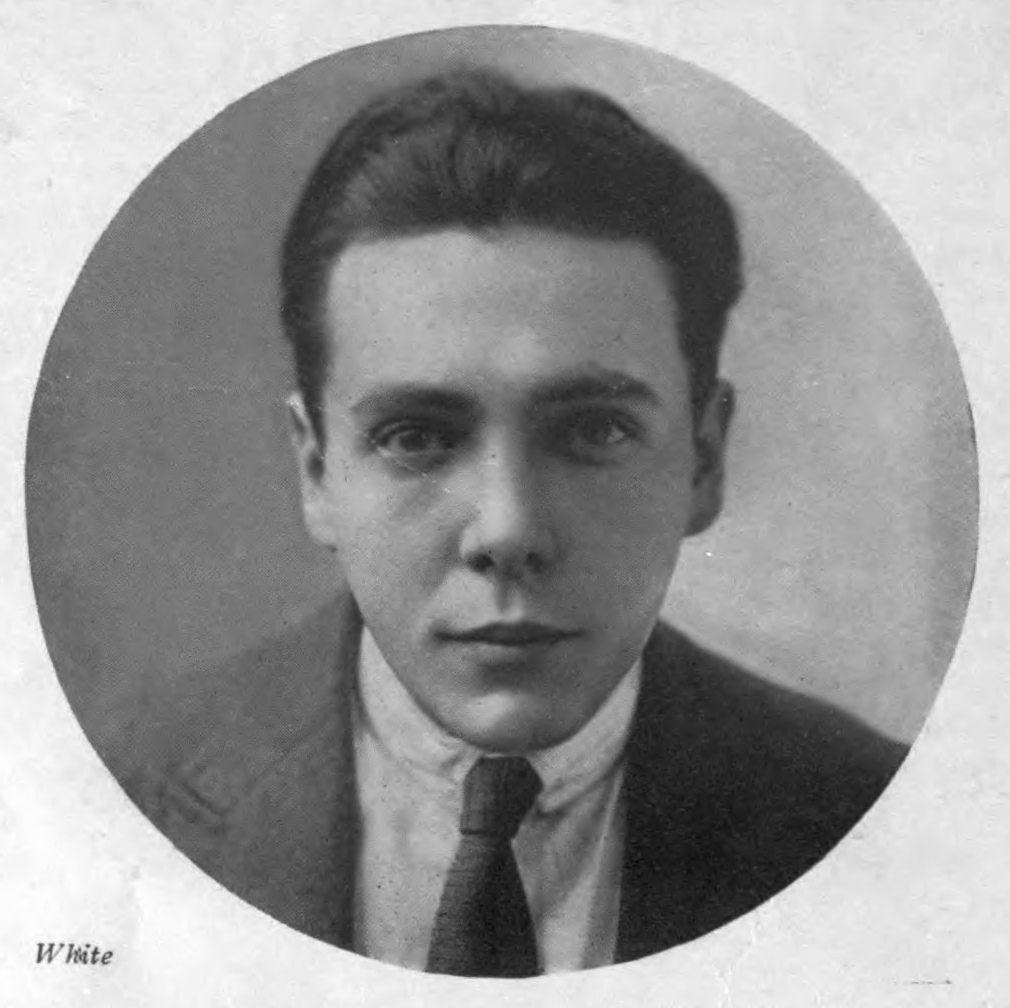
- Renavent in 1919
- Born: Georges de Chaux; April 23, 1892; Paris, France
- Died: January 2, 1969 (aged 76); Guadalajara, Mexico
- Resting place: Panteón Municipal de Zapopan Centro, Jalisco, Mexico
- Occupation: Actor
- Years active: 1915–1952
- Spouses: Gabrielle Perrier (m. 191?; died 1927); Gladys Dulcina Tilbury (m. 1927; div. 1938); Selena Royle (m. 1948)
- Children: 2

Georges Renavent (born Georges DeChaux, April 23, 1892 – January 2, 1969) was a French-American actor in film, Broadway plays and operator of an American Grand Guignol. He was born in Paris, France. In 1914, he immigrated to the United States, crossing the frontier between Canada and Vermont.

He was married to Selena Royle, an actress and daughter of Edwin Milton Royle, author of The Squaw Man, which was adapted for film and starred Cecil B. DeMille.

They left the United States to live in Mexico after Selena was entangled in the McCarthy era Communism investigations and Hollywood blacklist. While in Mexico, both Selena and Georges continued to be active in the arts and put out various cookbooks, including Pheasants for Peasants, A Gringa's Guide to Mexican Cooking, and Guadalajara As I Know, Live It, Love It.

== Acting career ==
His first American film appearance was in The Seven Sisters (1915). Fourteen years later, Renavent played an impressive starring role as the Kinkajou in the musical spectacular, Rio Rita (1929).

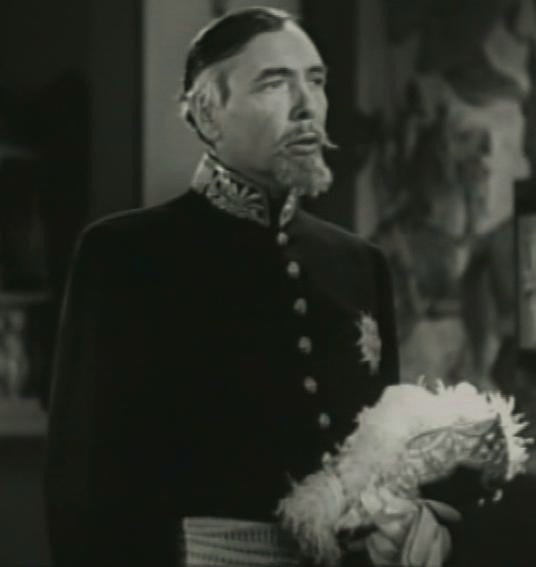
Renavent in The Son of Monte Cristo (1940)

Rio Rita was based on a 1927 stage musical by Florenz Ziegfeld, which originally united Wheeler and Woolsey as a team and made them famous. In 1929, Radio Pictures, later known as RKO Radio Pictures, purchased the film rights to this musical. The last portion of the film was photographed in Technicolor.

Renavent also starred in East of Borneo (1931), which was one of the most frequently telecast films of the 1950s and 1960s. East of Borneo starred Rose Hobart as Linda, the wife of African missionary Dr. Clark (Charles Bickford). whom she finds he's been living in luxury as court physician of the Prince of Marudu (Renavent). East of Borneo went on to achieve latter-day fame when avant-garde filmmaker Joseph Cornell spliced together all of the leading lady's close-ups, and came up with a surrealistic exercise titled Rose Hobart (1936).

In 1936, Renavent played opposite Boris Karloff and Bela Lugosi in The Invisible Ray (1936). He appeared in Hal Roach's Turnabout (1940). His final film was made in 1952, when he played Ortega in Mara Maru, with Errol Flynn.

== Broadway career ==
Renavent also ran his own American Grand Guignol and was involved in many Broadway plays in New York and LA, where he was involved in the Renavent Theater in 1936.

== Death ==
Renavent died in Guadalajara, Mexico in 1969.

== Selected filmography ==
- The Seven Sisters (1915) – Toni
- American – That's All (1917) – Lounge Lizard
- The Light (1919) – Auchat
- Erstwhile Susan (1919) – Emanual Dreary
- Rio Rita (1929) – General Ravinoff
- Slightly Scarlet (1930) – Inspector (uncredited)
- Le spectre vert (1930) – Dr. Ballon
- Scotland Yard (1930) – Dr. Dean
- Once a Sinner (1931) – Salon Manager (uncredited)
- The Magnificent Lie (1931) – French Military Doctor (uncredited)
- East of Borneo (1931) – Hashim—Prince of Marudu
- Arsène Lupin (1932) – Duval (uncredited)
- Whistlin' Dan (1932) – Capt. Serge Karloff
- Le bluffeur (1932) – Mr. Banks
- L'amour guide (1933) – Marco
- Private Detective 62 (1933) – Captain La Farge (uncredited)
- Ever in My Heart (1933) – Party Guest (uncredited)
- Queen Christina (1933) – Chanut, the French Ambassador
- Bombay Mail (1934) – Dr. Maurice Lenoir
- Moulin Rouge (1934) – Frenchman
- Fashions of 1934 (1934) – Paris Couturier (uncredited)
- The House of Rothschild (1934) – Count Talleyrand
- Stingaree (1934) – Coutouriere (uncredited)
- Stamboul Quest (1934) – Hotel Manager (uncredited)
- The Merry Widow (1934) – Adamovitch (uncredited)
- The White Cockatoo (1935) – Pierre
- Folies Bergère (1935) – Premier of France
- The Flame Within (1935) – Apartment House Manager (uncredited)
- Front Page Woman (1935) – Robert Chinard
- Anna Karenina (1935) – Attaché (uncredited)
- The Last Outpost (1935) – Turkish major (uncredited)
- Whipsaw (1935) – Monetta
- Captain Blood (1935) – French Captain (uncredited)
- The Invisible Ray (1936) – Chief of the Surete
- The Sky Parade (1936) – Baron Ankrovith (uncredited)
- China Clipper (1936) – Pan American Union Speaker (uncredited)
- The Charge of the Light Brigade (1936) – Gen. Canrobert (uncredited)
- Love Letters of a Star (1936) – Harrington
- Lloyd's of London (1936) – French Lieutenant
- She's Dangerous (1937) – Eduardo the Headwaiter (uncredited)
- History Is Made at Night (1937) – Insp. Millard (uncredited)
- Seventh Heaven (1937) – Sergeant Gendarme
- The King and the Chorus Girl (1937) – Yacht Captain (uncredited)
- Thin Ice (1937) – Head Porter (uncredited)
- Cafe Metropole (1937) – Captain
- Love Under Fire (1937) – Captain Contreras
- Fit for a King (1937) – Paul (uncredited)
- The Sheik Steps Out (1937) – Count Mario
- Wife, Doctor and Nurse (1937) – Nick
- Fight for Your Lady (1937) – Joris
- Charlie Chan at Monte Carlo (1937) – Renault
- Love and Hisses (1937) – Count Pierre Raoul Guerin
- Jezebel (1938) – De Lautruc
- Fools for Scandal (1938) – Le Petit Harlem Headwaiter (uncredited)
- Judge Hardy's Children (1938) – Mr. Cortot (uncredited)
- A Trip to Paris (1938) – Captain of Intelligence (uncredited)
- The Adventures of Robin Hood (1938) – Saxon peasant (uncredited)
- Blind Alibi (1938) – Art Dealer (uncredited)
- Gold Diggers in Paris (1938) – Gendarme
- The Young in Heart (1938) – Detective Sergeant (uncredited)
- I'll Give a Million (1938) – Gendarme
- Four's a Crowd (1938) – Enrico (uncredited)
- Suez (1938) – Bank President
- Sharpshooters (1938) – Police Chief (uncredited)
- Artists and Models Abroad (1938) – Prefect of Police
- Topper Takes a Trip (1938) – Magistrate
- Mr. Moto's Last Warning (1939) – Adm. Jacques Delacour (uncredited)
- The Three Musketeers (1939) – Captain Fageon
- The Adventures of Jane Arden (1939) – Frenchman (scenes deleted)
- Chasing Danger (1939) – French Colonel (uncredited)
- Indianapolis Speedway (1939) – Headwaiter (uncredited)
- Lady of the Tropics (1939) – Hotel Manager (uncredited)
- Pack Up Your Troubles (1939) – Col. Giraud
- Everything Happens at Night (1939) – Gendarme on Dock (uncredited)
- The House Across the Bay (1940) – French Official
- Turnabout (1940) – Mr. Ram
- Brother Orchid (1940) – Cable Office Clerk (uncredited)
- A Dispatch from Reuters (1940) – French Official (uncredited)
- Christmas in July (1940) – Office Door Sign-Painter (uncredited)
- The Son of Monte Cristo (1940) – Marquis de Chatante
- Comrade X (1940) – Laszlo
- Back Street (1941) – Doctor (voice, uncredited)
- That Hamilton Woman (1941) – Hotel Manager (uncredited)
- The Great Lie (1941) – Maitre d'Hotel (uncredited)
- That Night in Rio (1941) – Ambassador
- Road to Zanzibar (1941) – Saunders – Hotel Owner (uncredited)
- They Dare Not Love (1941) – Belgian Captain (uncredited)
- The Night of January 16th (1941) – Anton Haraba – Man With Briefcase (uncredited)
- Paris Calling (1941) – Butler
- Sullivan's Travels (1941) – Old Tramp
- Spy Smasher (1942) – Gov. LeComte [Ch. 3]
- Perils of Nyoka (1942) – Maghreb – Vultura's High Priest [Chs.1-4,7,9,15]
- I Married an Angel (1942) – Pierre Durant (uncredited)
- Now, Voyager (1942) – M. Henri (uncredited)
- Silver Queen (1942) – Andres
- Casablanca (1942) – Conspirator (uncredited)
- The Hard Way (1943) – Embassy Club Headwaiter (uncredited)
- Mission to Moscow (1943) – President Paul van Zeeland (uncredited)
- Background to Danger (1943) – Customs Official with Ana (uncredited)
- Appointment in Berlin (1943) – Van der Wyn (uncredited)
- Secret Service in Darkest Africa (1943) – Armand
- Wintertime (1943) – Bodreau (uncredited)
- Around the World (1943) – French Captain (uncredited)
- The Desert Song (1943) – Radek (uncredited)
- Passage to Marseille (1944) – Guard (uncredited)
- Action in Arabia (1944) – Prefect of Police (uncredited)
- The Tiger Woman (1944) – The Commandant of Police [Chs. 2-7-8 – 12] (uncredited)
- The Mask of Dimitrios (1944) – Fisherman (uncredited)
- The Desert Hawk (1944) – Emil of Telif
- Till We Meet Again (1944) – Gabriel (uncredited)
- Our Hearts Were Young and Gay (1944) – Monsieur Darnet (uncredited)
- Storm Over Lisbon (1944) – Secret Service Officer (uncredited)
- Experiment Perilous (1944) – Voice Instructor (uncredited)
- Those Endearing Young Charms (1945) – Hotel St. Mark Maitre'd (uncredited)
- Captain Eddie (1945) – French General (uncredited)
- Rhapsody in Blue (1945) – Guest (uncredited)
- You Came Along (1945) – Headwater (uncredited)
- Scotland Yard Investigator (1945) – Anton Miran (uncredited)
- This Love of Ours (1945) – Dr. Lebreton (uncredited)
- Cornered (1945) – Second Prefect (uncredited)
- Yolanda and the Thief (1945) – Train Passenger with Mink Eyebrows (uncredited)
- Saratoga Trunk (1945) – Ship Captain (uncredited)
- Tarzan and the Leopard Woman (1946) – Ivory Merchant (uncredited)
- The Hoodlum Saint (1946) – Jeweler (uncredited)
- The Catman of Paris (1946) – Guillard
- Our Hearts Were Growing Up (1946) – Maitre d' (uncredited)
- The Searching Wind (1946) – Ambassador de Frontigny (uncredited)
- Of Human Bondage (1946) – Artist (uncredited)
- The Return of Monte Cristo (1946) – Immigration Officer (uncredited)
- Ladies' Man (1947) – Mr. Jones, Hotel Manager
- The Perfect Marriage (1947) – Waiter Captain (uncredited)
- Tarzan and the Huntress (1947) – Man Weighing King (uncredited)
- The Trespasser (1947) – Waiter (uncredited)
- The Perils of Pauline (1947) – French Doctor #2 (uncredited)
- The Foxes of Harrow (1947) – Priest (uncredited)
- It's a Great Feeling (1949) – Andre Bernet (uncredited)
- Rope of Sand (1949) – Jacques the Headwaiter (uncredited)
- Fortunes of Captain Blood (1950) – Count Harrouch (uncredited)
- Secrets of Monte Carlo (1951) – Inspector Marcel Remy
- Strangers on a Train (1951) – Monsieur Darville (uncredited)
- The Law and the Lady (1951) – French Manager (uncredited)
- Mara Maru (1952) – Ortega
- Son of Ali Baba (1952) – Shah of Persia (uncredited)
- Because You're Mine (1952) – General Pierre Montal (uncredited)

== Partial Theatre credits ==
- Goin' Home
- Diplomacy
- The Last Torture
- Antonia
- Grounds for Divorce
- The Crooked Square
- The Texas Nightingale
- The Pigeon
- Genius and the Crowd
- Mis' Nelly of N'Orleans
- Flo-Flo
- Somebody's Luggage
- Twentieth Century Players
