= Films from the South =

Annual film festival

Films from the South (Norwegian: Film fra sør) is an international movie festival held annually in Oslo, Norway. Movies from Africa, Asia, and Latin-America are shown. The festival has its origin in the student film club of University of Oslo, and has become one of Norway's most favourite festivals. It has approximately 20,000 visitors each year. The festival functions as a rendezvous to ethnic Norwegians and people with multicultural backgrounds.

The main award is the Silver Mirror for best feature film. Other awards include the audience award, the FIPRESCI-award and the DOK:SØR award for best documentary.

== Awards ==
=== Silver Mirror ===
Until 2003 known as 'The Oslo Films from the South Award'.

Year	Title	Director	Country of origin
1997	Labyrinth of Dreams	Gakuryū Ishii	Japan
1998	Innocence	Zeki Demirkubuz	Turkey
1999	Life Is to Whistle	Fernando Pérez	Cuba
2000	Amores perros	Alejandro González Iñárritu	Mexico
2001	Baran	Majid Majidi	Iran
2002	A House with a View of the Sea	Alberto Aruelo	Venezuela
2003	James' Journey to Jerusalem	Ra'anan Alexandrowicz	Israel
2004	Head-On	Fatih Akın	Turkey / Germany
2005	Electric Shadows	Xiao Jiang	China
2006	Water	Deepa Mehta	Canada
2007	Caramel	Nadine Labaki	Lebanon
2008	Buddha Collapsed Out of Shame	Hana Makhmalbaf	Iran
2009	City of Life and Death	Lu Chuan	China
2010	The Housemaid	Im Sang-soo	South Korea
2011	Las Acacias	Pablo Giorgelli	Argentina
2012	Wolf Children	Mamoru Hosoda	Japan
2013	The Dance of Reality	Alejandro Jodorowsky	Chile
2014	Gett: The Trial of Viviane Amsalem	Ronit Elkabetz and Shlomi Elkabetz	Israel
2015	Ixcanul	Jayro Bustamante	Guatemala / France
2016	After the Storm (2016 film)	Hirokazu Koreeda	Japan
2017	Araby	João Dumans and Affonso Uchoa	Brazil
2018	Burning	Lee Chang-dong	South Korea
2019	—N/a	Park Chan-wook	South Korea

=== Other awards ===
Year	FIPRESCI	DOK:SØR	Audience	Honorary	Oslo Cinema launching price
1997			La nave de los sueños		
1998			Martin (Hache)		
1999			The Lighthouse		
2000	The Day I Became a Woman		El mismo amor, la misma lluvia		
2001	La libertad		Nine Queens		
2002	Whispering Sands		Son of the Bride		
2003	James' Journey to Jerusalem		Valentín		
2004	Earth and Ashes		Avellaneda's Moon		
2005	Paradise now		Hana & Alice		
2006	Climates		Elsa & Fred		
2007	Khadak		The Year My Parents Went on Vacation		
2008	24 City	War Child	Waltz with Bashir	Raoul Peck	Waltz with Bashir
2009	A moment in June	Rough Aunties	For a Moment, Freedom	Hirokazu Kore-eda	Still Walking
2010	A Brand New Life	Benda Bilili!	Castaway on the Moon	Dag Asbjørnsen	Women Without Men
2011	On the Edge	Tahrir 2011: The good, the Bad & the Politician	Where Do We Go Now?		
2012	Neighbouring Sounds	Searching for Sugar Man	Wolf Children		
2013		The Last Station	The Past	Apichatpong Weerasethakul	
2014		Concerning Violence	Wild Tales	Alejandro Jodorowsky	
2015		Those Who Feel the Fire Burning	Dheepan	Abderrahmane Sissako	
2016		Fire at Sea	My Neighbour Totoro	Mahamat Saleh Haroun	
