= Panteón Zapopan Centro =

Cemetery in Zapopan, Jalisco, Mexico

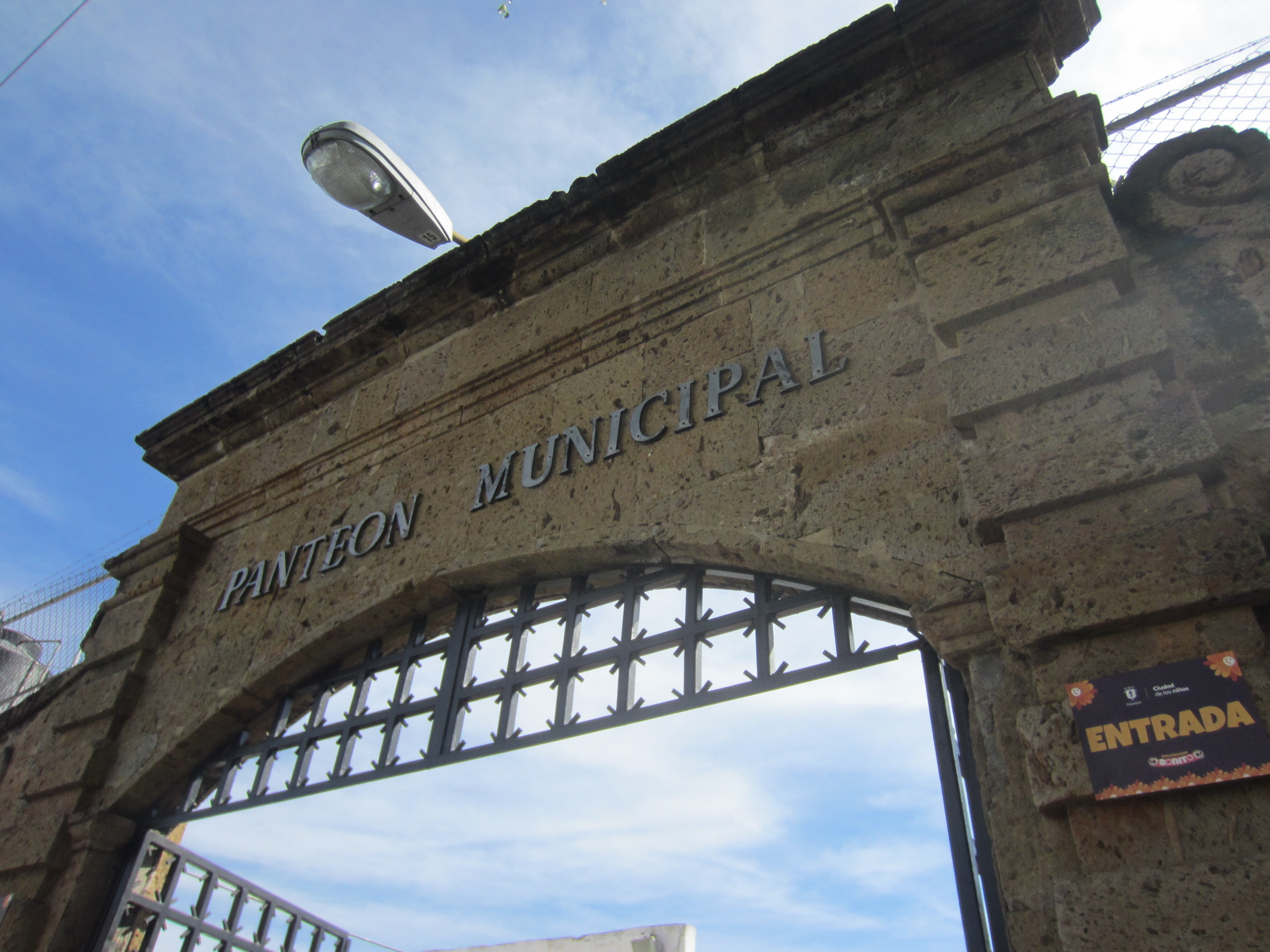
- Entrance gate, 2021

Details
- Location: Zapopan, Jalisco
- Country: Mexico
- Coordinates: 20.7267°N 103.3878°W

Panteón Zapopan Centro is a cemetery in Zapopan, in the Mexican state of Jalisco.

It is the resting place of actor Georges Renavent (1894–1969), who died in Guadalajara.

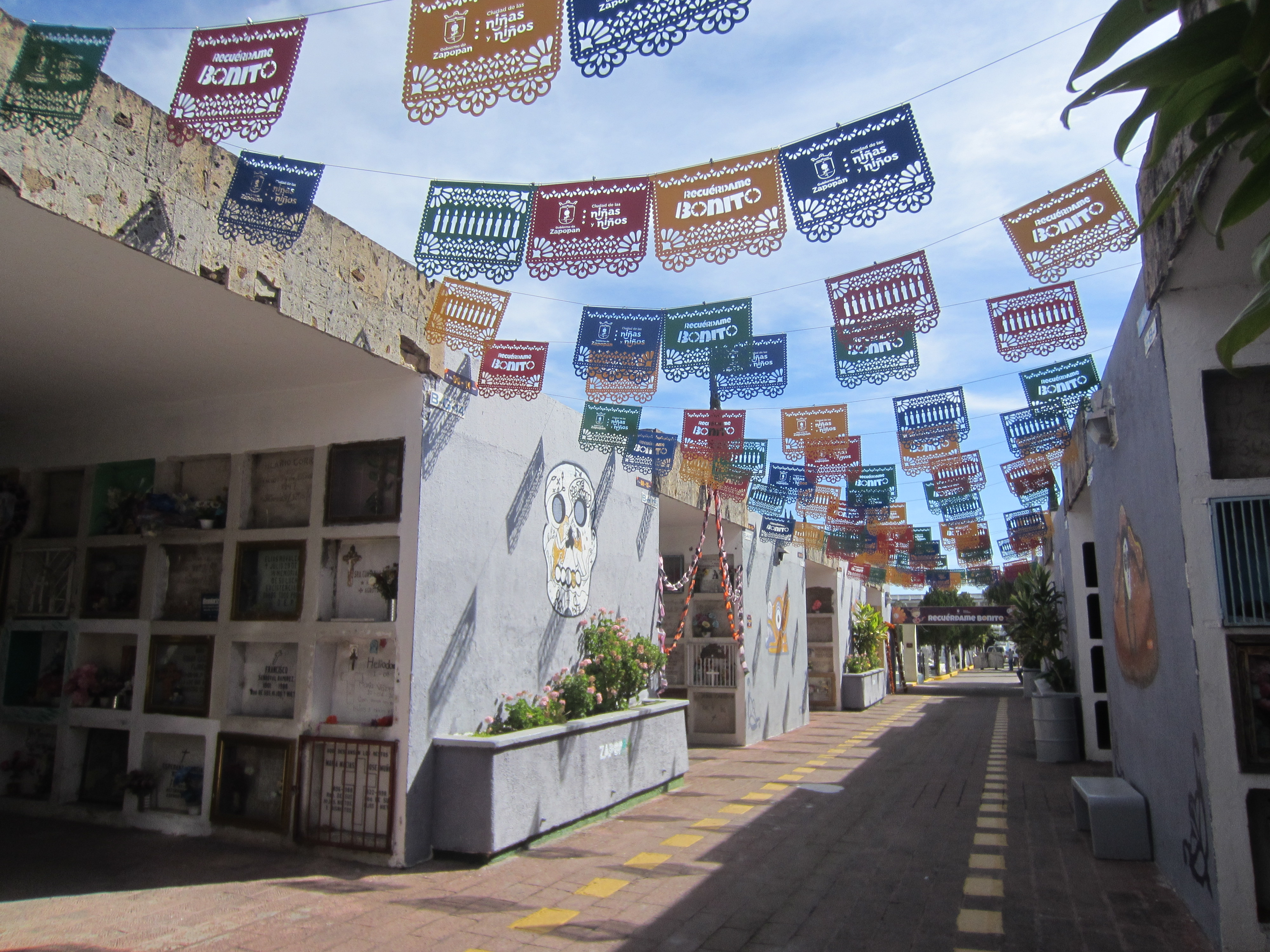

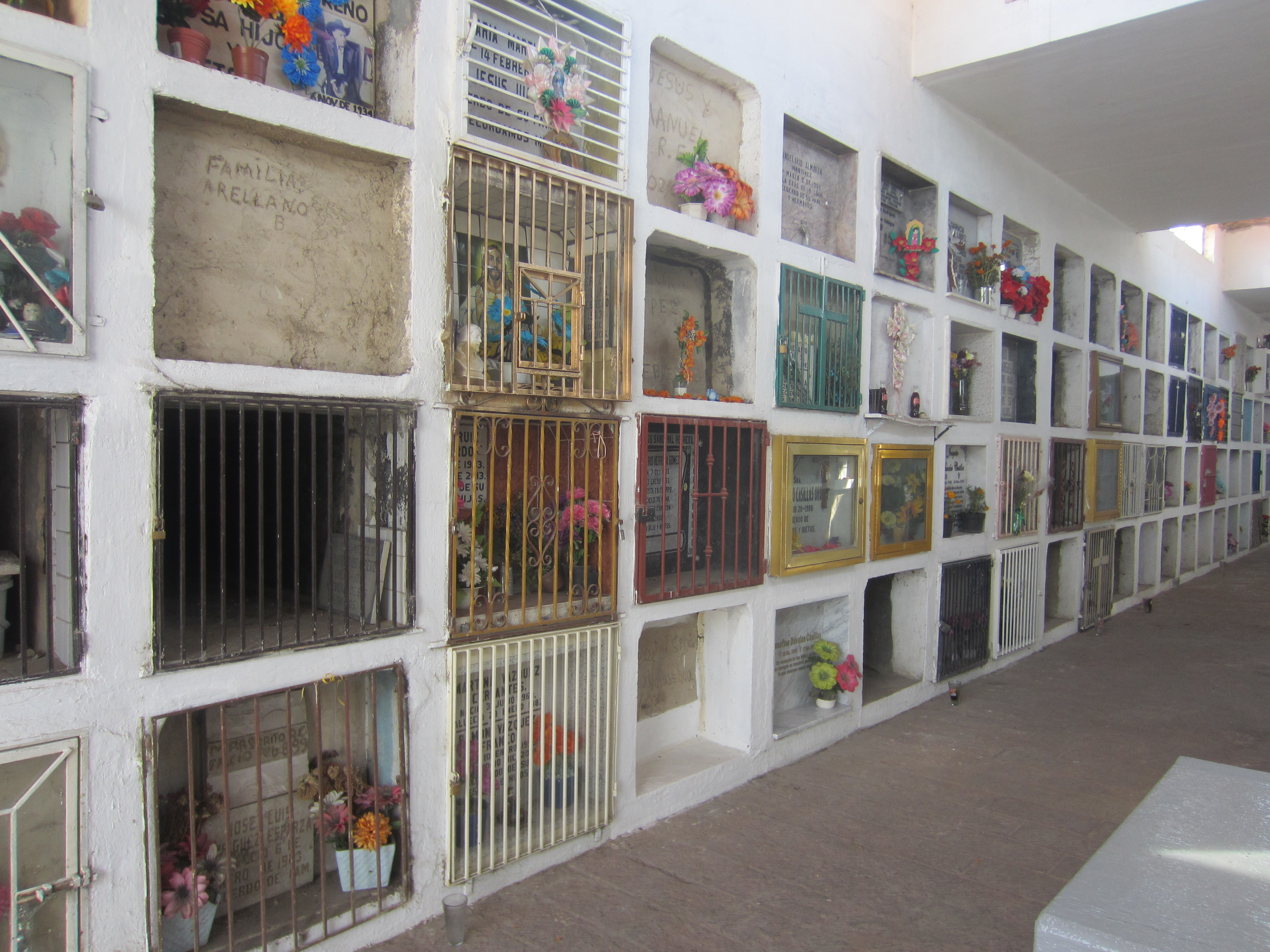

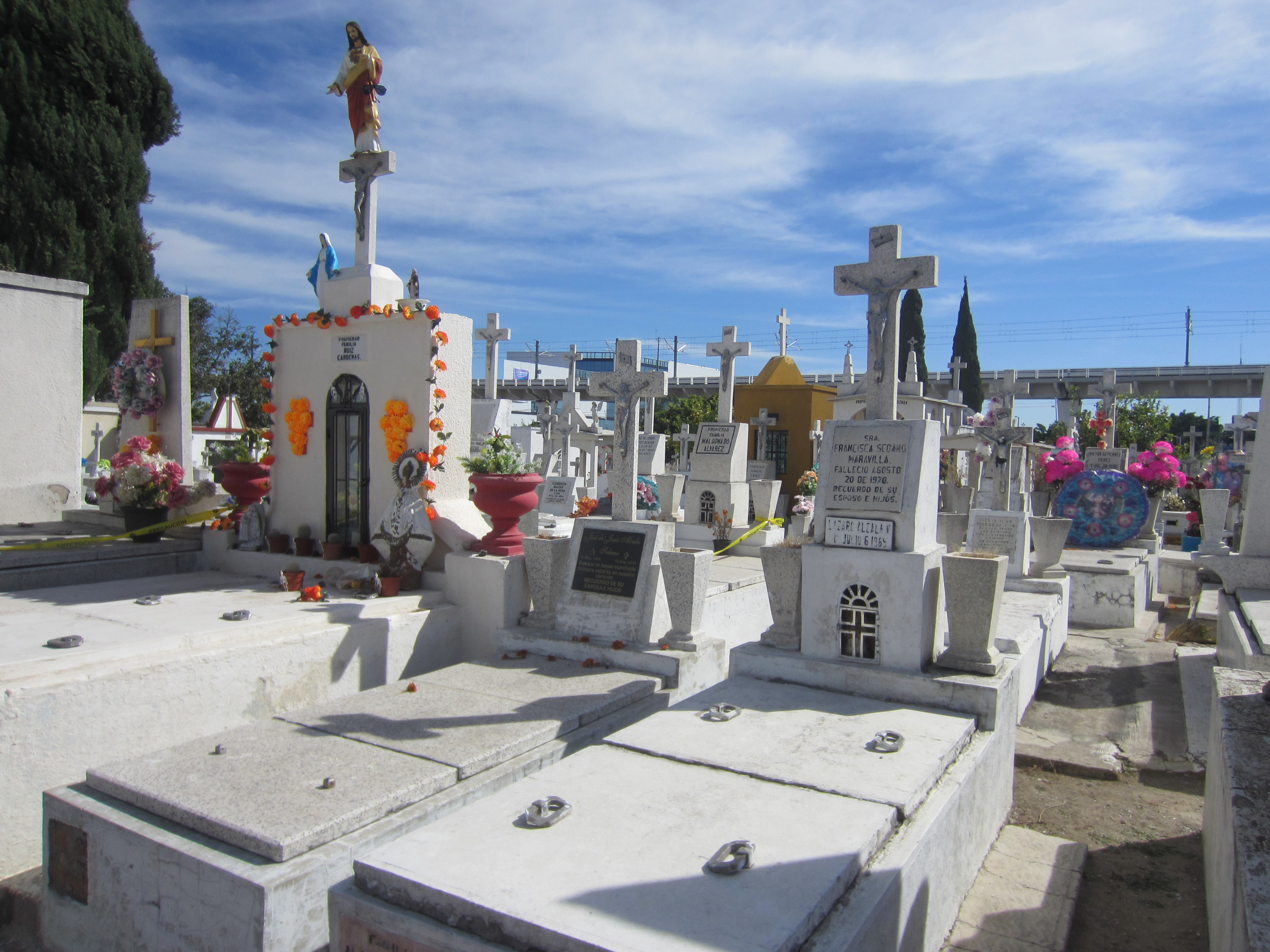
