= A Lady Surrenders =

1930 film directed by John M. Stahl

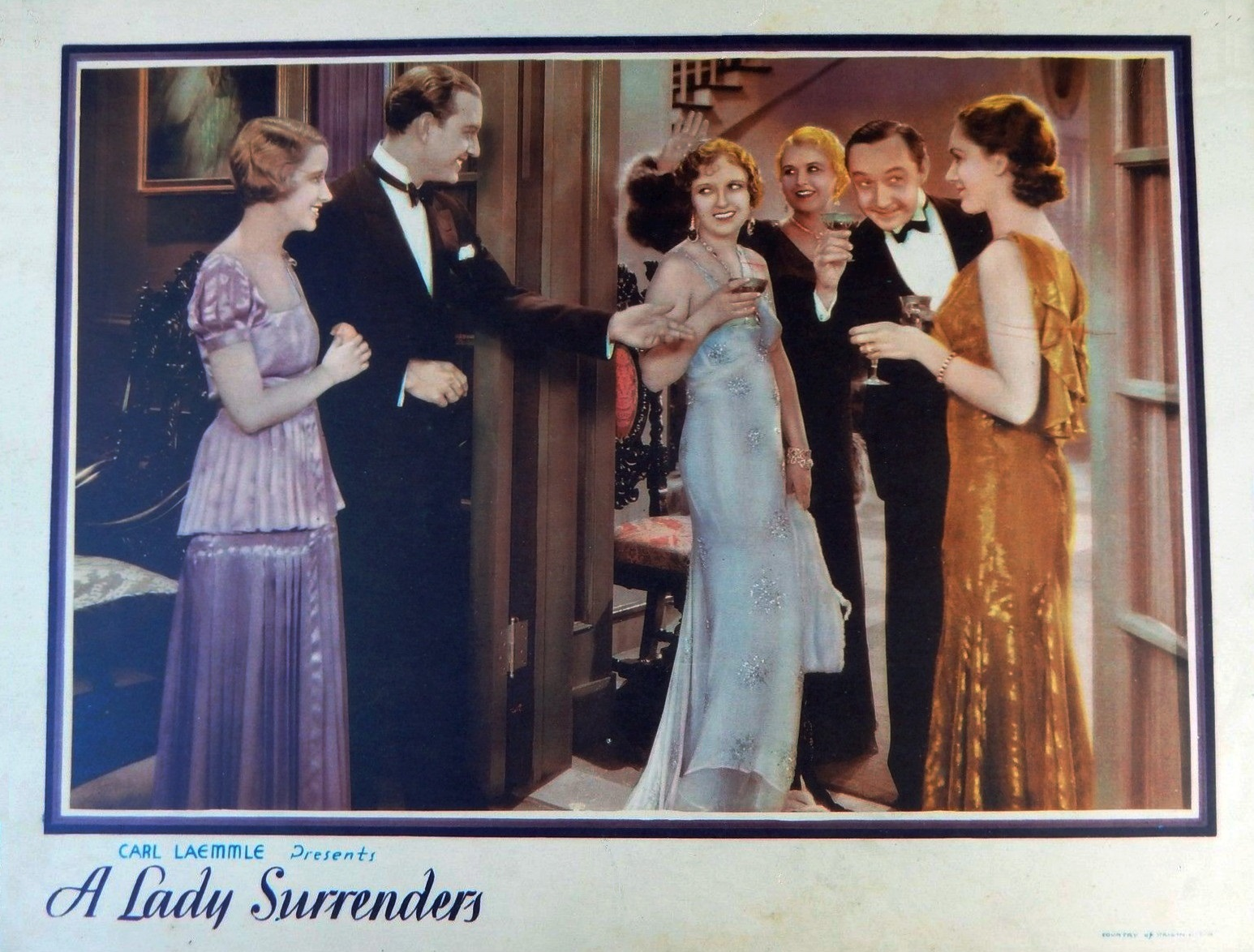
- Lobby card
- Directed by: John M. Stahl
- Written by: Gladys Lehman (adaptation); Arthur Richman (dialogue)
- Based on: Sincerity, a Story of Our Time by John Erskine
- Produced by: Carl Laemmle; Carl Laemmle, Jr.
- Starring: Genevieve Tobin; Conrad Nagel
- Cinematography: Jackson Rose
- Edited by: Maurice Pivar; William L. Cahn
- Distributed by: Universal Pictures
- Release date: November 6, 1930
- Running time: 95 minutes
- Country: United States
- Language: English

A Lady Surrenders is a 1930 American Pre-Code romantic drama film directed by John M. Stahl and starring Genevieve Tobin, Rose Hobart, Conrad Nagel, and Basil Rathbone. A copy exists in the Library of Congress.

== Plot summary ==
A man is left by his wife and assuming her to be gone forever, he remarries. Complications ensue when his original wife returns home.

== Cast ==
- Conrad Nagel as Winthrop Beauvel
- Rose Hobart as Isabel Beauvel
- Genevieve Tobin as Mary
- Basil Rathbone as Carl Vandry
- Edgar Norton as Butler
- Carmel Myers as Sonia
- Franklin Pangborn as Lawton
- Vivien Oakland as Mrs. Lynchfield
- Grace Cunard as Maid
- Virginia Hammond as Woman
