= Daniel Roby =

Canadian film director and cinematographer

Daniel Roby (born October 25, 1970, in Montreal, Quebec) is a Canadian film director and cinematographer. An alumnus of the film programs at Concordia University and the University of Southern California, he worked as a camera operator and cinematographer on numerous film and television projects before releasing his own directorial debut, White Skin (La Peau blanche), in 2004.

White Skin won the award for Best Canadian First Feature Film at the 2004 Toronto International Film Festival, and the Claude Jutra Award for best feature film by a first-time director at the 25th Genie Awards.

Roby's second film as a director, Funkytown, premiered at the Toronto International Film Festival in 2010 before going into general release in 2011. His third film, Louis Cyr, was released in 2013, going on to win nine Jutra Awards in 2014 including Best Film.

Throughout 2015, he directed three episodes of Versailles, Canal+'s $45-million budget production covering the life of Louis XIV.

His fourth film, Just a Breath Away (Dans la brume), was released in 2018. It received eight Canadian Screen Award nominations at the 7th Canadian Screen Awards in 2019, including Best Picture and a nod for Roby as Best Director.

Most Wanted, dramatizing an incident from the career of real-life journalist Victor Malarek, was released in 2020. In 2022 he directed the third season of TV series La Faille.

In 2023 he was announced as the director of Villeneuve: The Rise of a Legend (Villeneuve : l'ascension d'une légende), a forthcoming biopic of Canadian auto racing driver Gilles Villeneuve. Due to disagreements with producer Christian Larouche over the film's creative direction, he was dropped from the project in fall 2024, with Yan Lanouette Turgeon brought in to replace him, although the film is still based on Roby's screenplay.
