= Compromised (film) =

1931 film

- Theatrical poster
- Directed by: John G. Adolfi; Ben Silvey
- Written by: Play: Edith Fitzgerald; Adaptation: Florence Ryerson; Screenplay: Waldemar Young
- Starring: Rose Hobart; Ben Lyon; Claude Gillingwater
- Cinematography: Ernest Haller
- Music by: David Mendoza; Oscar Potoker
- Distributed by: First National Pictures: A Subsidiary of Warner Bros. Pictures
- Release date: December 5, 1931 (U.S.)
- Running time: 65 minutes
- Country: United States
- Language: English

Compromised is a 1931 American pre-Code drama film produced and released by First National Pictures, a subsidiary of Warner Bros. Pictures, and directed by John G. Adolfi. The film stars Rose Hobart, Ben Lyon, and Claude Gillingwater. It was based on a play by Edith Fitzgerald. This film is presumed lost.

== Cast ==
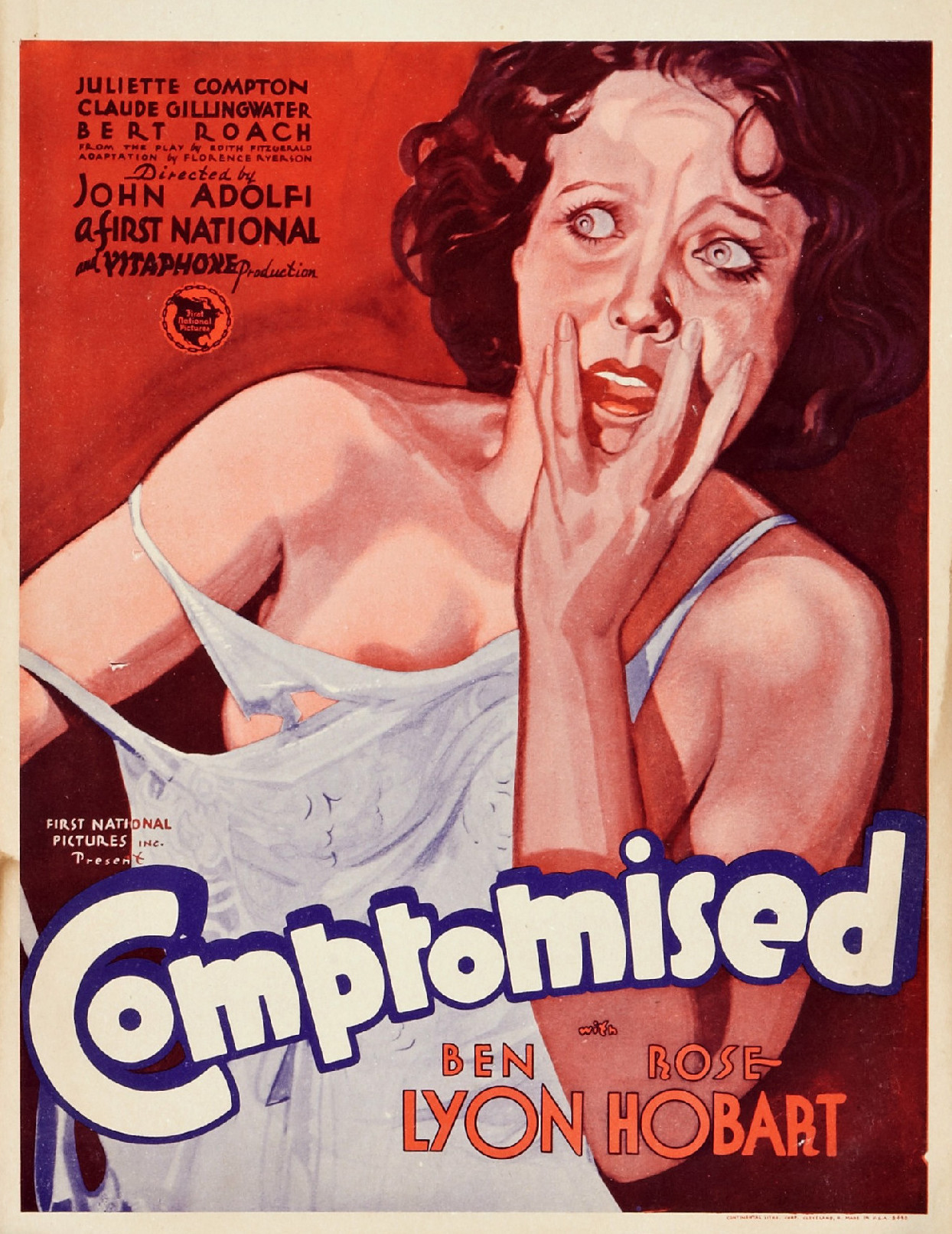
Window card

- Rose Hobart as Ann Brock
- Ben Lyon as Sidney Brock
- Claude Gillingwater as John Brock
- Florence Britton as Louise Brock
- Emma Dunn as Mrs. Squires
- Bert Roach as Tony
- Delmar Watson as Sandy
- Louise Mackintosh as Mrs. Munsey
- Juliette Compton as Connie Holt
- Edgar Norton as Tipton
- Adele Watson as Mrs. Bird
- Virginia Sale as Maggie

== Preservation ==
No film elements are known to survive. The soundtrack, which was recorded on Vitaphone disks, may survive in private hands.
