= PK.COM.CN =

- Traditional Chinese: 誰說青春不能錯
- Simplified Chinese: 谁说青春不能错
- Hanyu Pinyin: Shéi Shuō Qīng Chūn Bù Néng Cuò
- Jyutping: Seoi4 Syut3 Cing1 Ceon1 Bat1 Nang4 Co3
- Directed by: Xiao Jiang
- Written by: Xiao Jiang; He Changsheng (novel)
- Starring: Jaycee Chan; Bolin Chen; Niu Mengmeng
- Release date: 14 March 2007
- Country: China
- Language: Mandarin

PK.COM.CN is a 2007 Chinese film directed by Xiao Jiang. It stars Jaycee Chan, Bolin Chen, and Niu Mengmeng. The plot was adapted from an online novel, Lost in Time (在时), by He Xiaotian (何小天). in this film: Jaycee Chan and Bolin Chen reunite after starring in the Twin Effects II.

The film has an unusual style, incorporating music, dance, and art. It was screened at the Hollywood China Film Festival in 2007 and at the 2008 Shanghai International Film Festival.

== Background ==
In 2005, PK.COM.CN was co-produced as an "interactive movie", a project involving Beijing Forbidden City Movie Company, Xintong Media, Sina Net, and M-Zone. Key aspects of the film were decided through voting by "cyber citizens", such as the lead actors and director, and even certain details about the plot and ending.

== Plot ==
PK.COM.CN tells the story of Zhang Wenli (Jaycee Chan), a young doctor with overbearing parents who is invited to a reunion of his medical school class. At the reunion he has flashbacks to his best friends from medical school - his popular and charismatic roommate, Ji Yinchuan (Bolin Chen), and a mysterious and rebellious girl, A Fei (Niu Mengmeng).

== Cast ==
- Jaycee Chan
- Bolin Chen
- Niu Mengmeng
- Zhang Bo
- Law Kar-ying
- Li Qinqin
