= East of Borneo =

1931 film

- Directed by: George Melford
- Written by: Edwin H. Knopf; Dale Van Every
- Produced by: Carl Laemmle Jr.; Paul Kohner; George Melford
- Starring: Rose Hobart; Charles Bickford; Georges Renavent; Lupita Tovar; Noble Johnson; Tetsu Komai
- Cinematography: George Robinson
- Edited by: Arthur Tavares
- Production company: Universal Pictures
- Distributed by: Universal Pictures
- Release date: August 1, 1931
- Running time: 77 minutes
- Country: United States
- Language: English

East of Borneo is a 1931 American Pre-Code adventure film directed by George Melford, co-written by Edwin H. Knopf and Dale Van Every, starring Rose Hobart, Charles Bickford, Georges Renavent, Lupita Tovar, and Noble Johnson, and released by Universal Studios.

In 1936, artist Joseph Cornell edited this feature film into his short experimental film Rose Hobart which runs about 19 minutes.

== Plot ==
Linda Randolph looks for her husband on the island of Marado just east of Borneo. Although Linda is warned that Marado's jungles are "entirely too dangerous" for a white woman, she persists through dangerous raft rides and wild crocodiles. She discovers that her husband is now the personal physician of the island's enigmatic prince. The prince lusts for Linda, and a love triangle ensues.

== Cast ==
- Rose Hobart as Linda Randolph
- Charles Bickford as Dr. Allan Randolph
- Georges Renavent as Hashim, Prince of Marudu
- Lupita Tovar as Neila
- Noble Johnson as Osman
- Tetsu Komai as Hrang the Raftsman

== Production ==
The film was shot largely at Universal Studios. Despite being essentially a B-picture, East of Borneo featured elaborate sets. Props and set dressing used in the film were reportedly valued at $100,000; this figure includes a large $25,000 Buddha statue, a very rare small white Buddha and a long mother-of-pearl inlaid bench, silver dinner utensils, and Oriental rugs and drapery.

== Other ==
The film was used in the creation of Rose Hobart, a 1936 experimental collage film created by the artist Joseph Cornell, who cut and re-edited East of Borneo into one of America's most famous surrealist short films. Cornell was fascinated by the star of East of Borneo, an actress named Rose Hobart, and named his short film after her. The piece consists of snippets from East of Borneo combined with shots from a documentary film of an eclipse.
