= White Skin (film) =

- French: La Peau blanche
- Directed by: Daniel Roby
- Written by: Joël Champetier; Daniel Roby
- Produced by: Daniel Roby
- Starring: Marc Paquet; Marianne Farley
- Cinematography: Éric Cayla
- Edited by: Yvann Thibaudeau
- Release date: September 17, 2004 (Toronto Film Festival)
- Running time: 92 minutes
- Country: Canada
- Language: French

White Skin (French: La Peau blanche) is a 2004 Canadian horror film directed by Daniel Roby and starring Marc Paquet and Marianne Farley. It was released on video in the United States under the title Cannibal. The film won the award for Best Canadian First Feature Film at the 2004 Toronto International Film Festival, and the Claude Jutra Award for best feature film by a first-time director at the 25th Genie Awards.

== Premise ==
Two men discover that one's girlfriend is a succubus that needs to feed on human flesh.

== Cast ==
- Marc Paquet – Thierry Richard
- Marianne Farley – Claire Lefrançois
- Frédéric Pierre – Henri Dieudonné
- Jessica Malka – Marquise Lefrançois
- Julie LeBreton – Isabel Lefrançois
- Lise Roy – Diane Lefrançois
- Jou Jou Turenne – Marie-Pierre Janvier
- Raymond Cloutier – Professor Théoret
- Marcel Sabourin – Dr. Paul-Émile Gagnon
- Jude Antoine Jarda – Eddy
- Anna Beaupré Moulounda – Sandra
- Isabelle Guérard – Manon the prostitute
- Fayolle Jean – Haiti spokesman
