= Pigeon (film) =

- Directed by: Anthony Green
- Produced by: Karen Wookey
- Release date: 2004 (Toronto)
- Country: Canada

Pigeon is a short film by Canadian director Anthony Green. It was produced by Emmy and Gemini nominated Canadian producer Karen Wookey. Jay Firestone was executive producer of the film.

== History ==
Pigeon was Anthony Green's first film, made at age 21, while a student at NYU Film School. He learned the story from his religious leader, Eli Rubenstein, of Congregation Habonim Toronto, when he was searching for a short film story to use for his final film project at NYU.

== Synopsis ==
Pigeon is based on the true story of Susi Penzias, aunt of Nobel Prize winning Arno Allan Penzias (who fled Munich, Germany on the Kindertransport in 1939) and great aunt of Rabbi Shifra Weiss-Penzias.

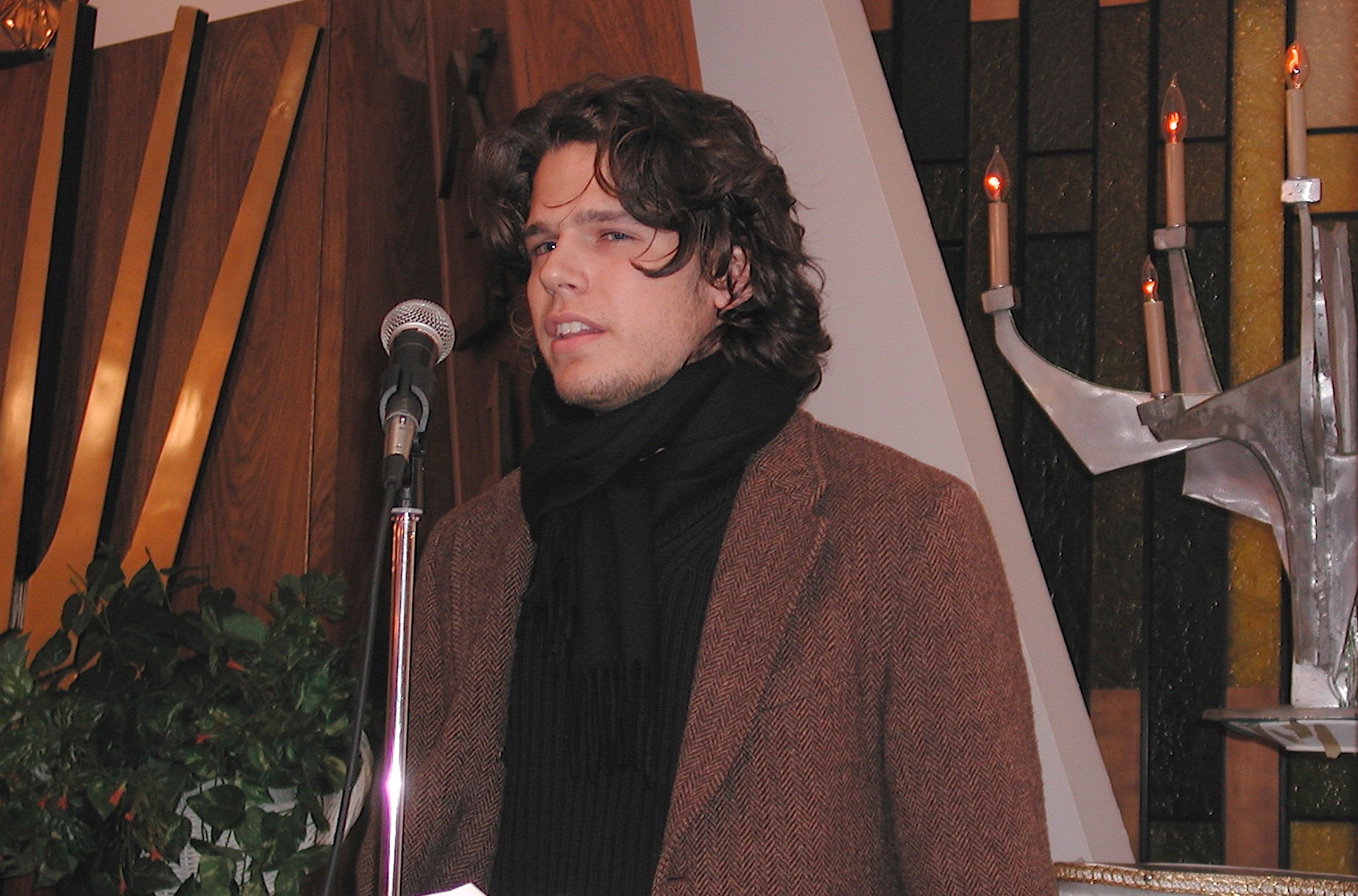
Anthony Green Speaking at the special Screening of "Pigeon", Jan. 9, 2005 at Congregation Habonim in Toronto

The film stars Academy Award nominee Michael Lerner and Canadian actors Wendy Crewson and Joseph Marrese.

Set in Remies, France in 1941 during World War II, the film describes a chance encounter on a train between a Jewish man trying to escape Nazi persecution and a woman - a complete stranger - sitting next to him on the train.

== Awards ==
The film, an official selection of the 2004 Toronto International Film Festival, was grand-prize winner at the 2005 NYU New York Jewish Student Film Festival, and best short film at the 2008 Seattle Jewish Film Festival.

Pigeon has played at over two dozen film festivals and won numerous awards. In Ken Dancyger and Pat Cooper's book Writing the Short Film, Pigeon is employed as a model for educating students about the Holocaust.

The film has been used by many educational institutions teaching young people about the Holocaust, as an example of resistance against the Nazis during World War II.

== Subsequent work ==
Subsequent to Pigeon, Green directed the short film SCREENING, for his thesis at NYU. The sixteen-minute short film, which explores the topic of racial profiling in post-9/11 America, premiered at the Toronto International Film Festival in 2006, and won over 20 prestigious awards including Student Academy Award for Best Narrative Picture, as well as six Golden Sheaf Awards including Best Drama and Best Director. He also directed Salt of the Earth, a 70-minute documentary on the Rolling Stones' Bigger Bang Tour, which became one of the best-selling music DVDs of all time.
