= The Red Book (film) =

- Directed by: Janie Geiser
- Release date: 1994
- Running time: 11 minutes
- Country: United States

The Red Book is a 1994 American experimental animated short film by experimental filmmaker and theater/installation artist Janie Geiser.

== Summary ==
Geiser describes The Red Book as "an elliptical, pictographic animated film that uses flat, painted figures and collage elements in both two- and three-dimensional settings to explore the realms of memory, language and identity from the point of view of a woman amnesiac."

== Legacy ==
In 2009, it was selected for preservation in the National Film Registry by the Library of Congress for being "culturally, historically or aesthetically significant."
