= Electric Shadows =

- Traditional Chinese: 夢影童年
- Simplified Chinese: 梦影童年
- Hanyu Pinyin: Mèng Yǐng Tóngnián
- Directed by: Xiao Jiang
- Written by: Xiao Jiang; Cheng Qingsong
- Produced by: Derek Yee; Huang Jianxin
- Starring: Xia Yu; Li Haibin; Zhang Yijing; Qi Zhongyang; Wang Zhengjia
- Cinematography: Chen Hong; Yang Lien
- Edited by: Lei Qin
- Music by: Zhao Linzhao
- Distributed by: Fortissimo Films
- Release dates: September 11, 2004 (Toronto); January 19, 2006 (Hong Kong)
- Running time: 93 minutes
- Country: China
- Language: Mandarin

Electric Shadows is a 2004 Chinese film directed by Xiao Jiang. The English title of the film is the literal translation for the Chinese term for movies or "dian ying" (電影).

Electric Shadows is the debut film of director Xiao Jiang, one of the few active female directors in China. Xiao and Cheng Qingsong wrote the screenplay. The film was produced by mainland China's Beijing Dadi Century and Hong Kong's Happy Pictures Culture Communication Company.

The film begins when a young woman mysteriously attacks a stranger and then asks him to care for her fish while she is being arrested. When he enters her apartment he discovers an apparent shrine to the 1930s actress Zhou Xuan and that they share a love of the cinema and more. The film's reverent attitude towards the power of film and particularly classic film has brought it comparison to, or at least reference to Italy's Cinema Paradiso.

== Plot ==
Mao Xiaobing (Xia Yu), a water bottle delivery boy in Beijing, loves to watch movies. One day, however, while riding his bike, he is attacked by Ling-Ling (Qi Zhongyang), a disturbed young woman, that lands him in the hospital. Ling-Ling is promptly arrested, but refuses to say why she attacked Mao Xiaobing, asking him only to feed her fish. Upon entering her apartment, however, Mao Xiaobing finds that Ling-Ling has created a veritable shrine to the 1930s film star, Zhou Xuan. When he stumbles upon her diary and begins reading, the film flashes back to Ling-Ling's mother as a young woman in Ningxia.

Her mother had been working in radio when she became pregnant and subsequently abandoned by her lover. Branded a counter-revolutionary, she travels to the countryside where she befriends Pan, a movie-projectionist where the two eventually marry. Ling-Ling meanwhile, thinks that her real father is a movie star of Zhou Xuan's era. Mao Xiaobing had been hit by his father, and so Ling-Ling's mother took care of him for some days. When Ling-Ling's mother and Pan marry, Mao Xiaobing had been sent away to live with relatives by his father because Mao had been a troublemaker. Ling-Ling later recalls the time they were apart as miserable, saying also that the arrival of her younger brother was "disgusting." Despite that, it is later revealed that Ling-Ling learns to accept her younger brother, but the acceptance is short lived. Mao Xiaobing later realizes that she has been watching over her parents, and after tracking down the old couple, he asks why Ling-Ling is now deaf. Recalling the events, Pan explains that Bing-Bing (Ling-Ling's younger brother) had lied to their mother to get Ling-Ling out of the house. Both of them then went up to the rooftop where she and Mao Xiaobing would watch the movies through his binoculars. After saying she would leave, Bing-Bing begs her not to leave, but then falls to the ground. Pan then hits Ling-Ling for her brother's death, leaving her deaf in both ears.

The event severely traumatizes Ling-Ling, and she runs away not too long after. Living alone for so long in the city, she looks around and finds both her parents have moved to the same place, not too far from where she lives now. She finds a puppy and decides to name it after Bing Bing, but she leaves the puppy with her parents to help ease their loneliness. When Mao Xiaobing had accidentally knocked over a pile of bricks, consequently killing the puppy, it triggered Ling-Ling's memories of losing her brother; hence she attacked Mao Xiaobing.

Finding out where the mental institution is, Mao Xiaobing pays Ling-Ling a visit. He reveals his identity by giving back her film strip, and she is reunited with her parents watching an old movie on the same screen she grew up watching.

== Cast ==
- Xia Yu as Mao Xiaobing;
- Qi Zhongyang as Ling-Ling;
- Jiang Yihon as Jiang Xuehua, Ling-Ling's mother;
- Guan Xiaotong as Ling-Ling as a young girl;
- Li Haibin as Pan, a friendly movie projectionist;
- Wang Zhengjia as Mao Xiaobing as a young boy
- Zhang Yijing as Ling-Ling as a teenager.

== Reception ==
The film was well received in the international press, garnering an 80% fresh rating from Rotten Tomatoes and a 70% "generally favorable reviews" rating from Metacritic. Many of the critics who found the film praiseworthy pointed to the film's earnestness. One critic praises that the film "Refreshingly... doesn't adopt a patronizing tone toward either the period or the movies, nor become embroiled in the politics." The Hollywood Reporter provides a similar analysis, and ends its review by stating that the film is "sweet and accomplished." On the other hand, the film's detractors often point to the same aspects that others found charming, and criticize the film's sentimentality and its melodrama. Stephen Holden of The New York Times while giving the film a generally favorable review, nevertheless also refers to the film as an "implausible Asian soap opera." In a less forgiving critic's words, however, the film was as "Ripe and mushy as an October peach."

The film was screened at the 2004 Toronto International Film Festival as well as at the Marrakech, Vancouver and Pusan festivals.

=== Awards and nominations ===
- International Film Festival of Marrakech, 2004
  - Special Jury Award
- Deauville Asian Film Festival, 2005
  - Lotus PremièreAward
- Film fra Sør Festivalen (Oslo), 2005
  - The Silver Mirror for best feature film

== DVD release ==
Electric Shadows was released in the United States and Canada on July 25, 2006 on Region 1 DVD by First Run Features. The film features the original Mandarin dialogue and English subtitles. The DVD's extras are sparse, with a photo gallery, director notes, and director Xiao Jiang's biography.
