= Flushing Meadows (film) =

- Directed by: Joseph Cornell
- Starring: Larry Jordan
- Release date: 1965
- Running time: 8 minutes
- Country: United States
- Language: Silent

Flushing Meadows is a 1965 American short film by Joseph Cornell with Larry Jordan. The film is 8 minutes long, in color, 16mm, and silent.

The film is an ode to the memory of Joyce Hunter, a Queens waitress Cornell met in 1962. Cornell apparently had an infatuation with Hunter even though she was found to have stolen items and attempted to fence them; Cornell never pressed charges against her.

Hunter was murdered in December 1964. The film was produced after her death and is largely a series of scenes from Flushing Cemetery, where Hunter was buried.

The film was first shown publicly at the Gramercy Theatre in New York City, on December 22, 2003. The short aired twice at the 2004 Toronto International Film Festival, in commemoration of the centennial of Cornell's birth.

== See also ==
- List of American films of 1965
