= Lynn Marie Kirby =

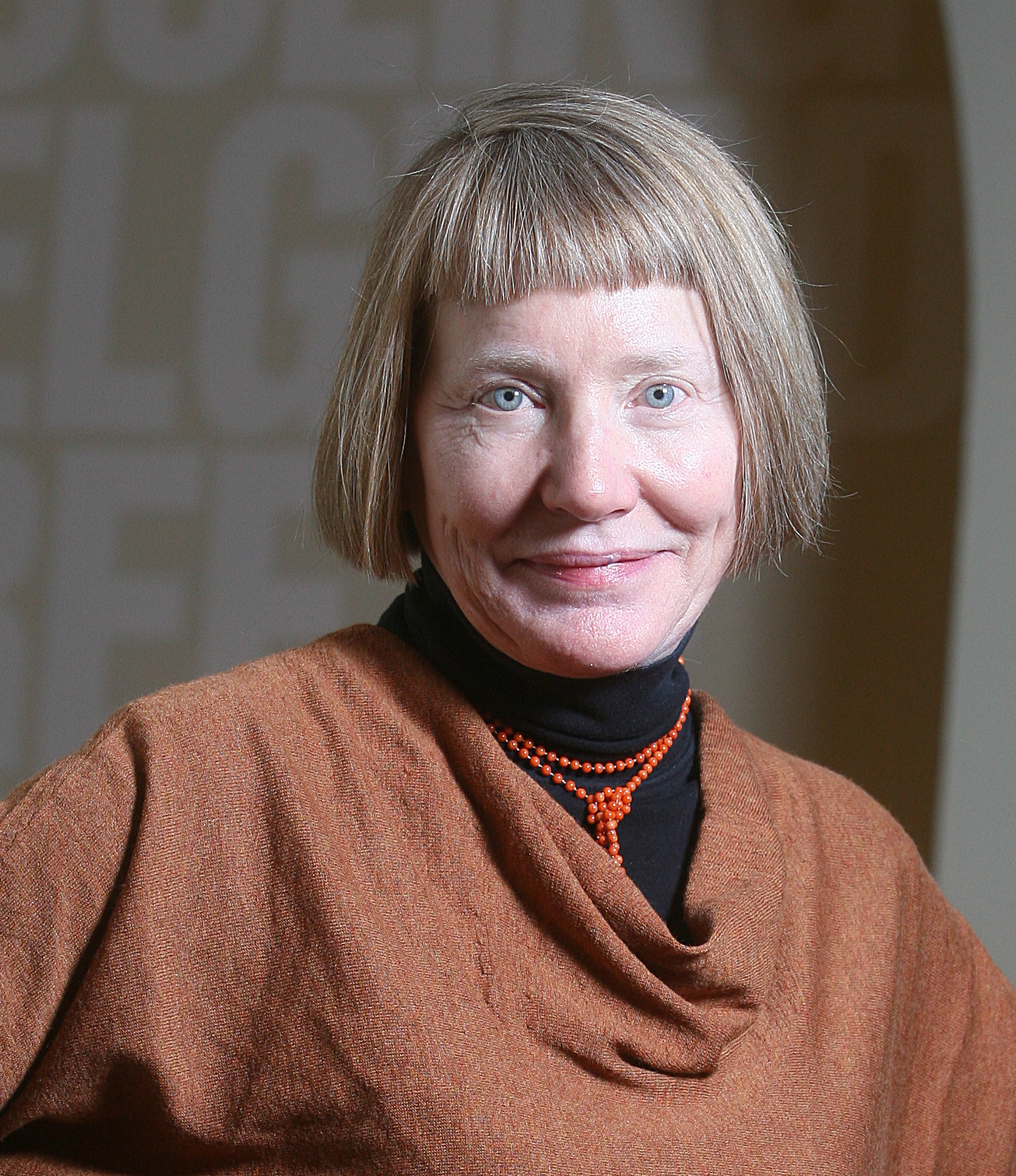
- Lynn Marie Kirby, 2014
- Born: Lynn Marie Kirby; 1952 (age 73–74); Washington D.C., United States
- Education: San Francisco Art Institute (BFA, MFA)
- Known for: Film, video, media installation, performance art
- Website: lynnmariekirby.com

Lynn Marie Kirby (born 1952) is an American visual artist, filmmaker and teacher. She lives in San Francisco, and is professor emerita at the California College of the Arts (CCA).

== Biography ==
Lynn Marie Kirby was born in 1952, in Washington, D.C., USA. She received her Bachelor of Fine Arts, and Master of Fine Arts degrees from the San Francisco Art Institute.

With a background in cinema and conceptual performance, Kirby works with shifting recording technologies, creating film/video hybrids, site interventions and mappings that become records of time, technologies and place. Kirby is engaged with attuning through different sensory systems. Her practice depends on improvisation and collaboration, accidents that make her jump, and forms of contemplation. She has collaborated with many artists, musicians, and writers, including Etel Adnan, Xiaofei Li, Anne Hege, Denise Newman, Alexis Joseph, the San Francisco Girls Chorus, Trinh T. Minh-ha, and Loreto Remsing.

Kirby's interest in the histories of place is closely connected to having grown up nomadically, living in Hong Kong, Libya, Belgium, Sweden and France. Kirby moved to the US to finish her undergraduate education at the San Francisco Art Institute’s conceptually driven sculpture program. While continuing to work in performance, video and installation, she began working in film and completed the MFA film program at the San Francisco Art Institute.

Kirby taught at the California College of the Arts where she was a professor of graduate and undergraduate fine arts, film and interdisciplinary studies, and where she is now a professor emerita. She is a member of Substantial Motion Research Network, an international network for scholars and practitioners interested in cross-cultural exploration of media art and philosophy.

== Exhibitions ==
Kirby has shown at galleries, museums and film festivals around the world. Many generous institutions, foundations, and people have supported her projects.
