= Lewis Klahr =

American animator and experimental filmmaker

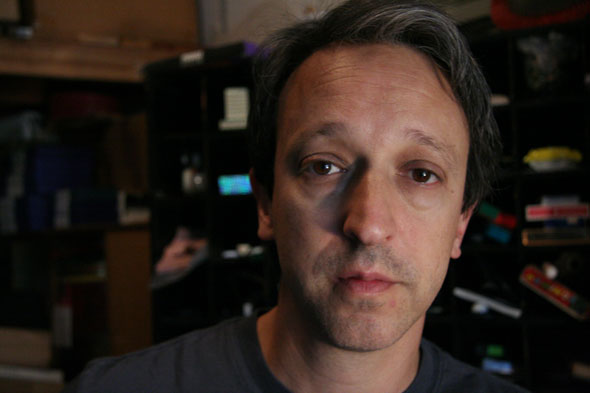
Lewis Klahr

Lewis Klahr (born 1956) is an American animator and experimental filmmaker known for his collage work since the 1970s.

== Biography ==
Klahr was born in 1956 and grew up in New York. He attended SUNY Purchase and SUNY Buffalo during the 1970s. Influenced by Kenneth Anger, Bruce Conner, Joseph Cornell, and Ken Jacobs, he made a collection of eight Super 8 films called Picture Books for Adults from 1983 to 1985. These were collage films, made mostly from found footage and rephotography. His second Super 8 series Tales of the Forgotten Future, made from 1988 to 1991, has twelve films arranged in four sections. The characters in these films are often depicted as outsiders searching for identity. The seven films in Klahr's 16 mm Engram Sepals cycle are perhaps his best known. They deal with addiction and debauchery in a materialistic consumer culture.

== Style ==
He uses an assortment of pop culture imagery from the 1950s to the 1970s to deconstruct the romantic promises of the past.

== Personal life ==
He is married to another experimental animator/filmmaker Janie Geiser.

== Selected filmography ==
- Her Fragrant Emulsion (1987)
- Hi-Fi Cadets (1989)
- The Pharaoh's Belt (1993)
- Altair (1995)
- Lulu (1996)
- Pony Glass (1998)
- The Pettifogger (2011)
- Sixty-Six (2015)
- Circumstantial Pleasures (2020)
- The Blue Rose of Forgetfulness (2022)
