= Juan Manuel Echavarría =

Juan Manuel Echavarria
- Born: 1947 (age 77–78); Medellín, Colombia
- Known for: Photography, video
- Notable work: Bocas de Cenza, Corte de Florero, Death and the River

Juan Manuel Echavarria Olano is a present-day Latin American artist from Colombia. Born in 1947 in Medellín, Colombia and now resides in Bogotá, Colombia and New York City.

== Studies ==
He studied at a university in the United States, and also spent time in Europe, specifically Greece, where he started to study mythology and poetry, and in his words, "became very dreamy". This showed up in his first book as he started his career as a writer publishing two novels, La Gran Catarata (1981) and Moros en la Costa (1991). He became fascinated with looking at history from different points of view, specifically looking at conquistadors confronted by cultures that were foreign. However, he soon became frustrated with writing as a creative outlet because his initial interest in literature stemmed from his love of the rich images it produced. Living and writing in New York, he told his artist friends that he was, "drowning in the world of writing". After realizing that he was more interested in imagery than writing, he turned to photography as a way to express the images and metaphors he wanted to portray.

== Photography ==
Echavarria started to produce photography and videos in 1995 that deal with the violence and civil conflicts that have plagued Colombia in the 20th century and still today. His pictures and documentations depict a nation that has become accustomed to the brutality associated with the conflicts between the national army, guerrilla groups, and paramilitaries which started in the 1950s and have continued through the drugs cartels of the 1980s into present day aggression. This seemingly endless and forgotten war becomes a reality to the viewer who is faced with photographs and videos showing death and destruction.

== Colombia: A History of Violence ==
In order to understand the contexts of Juan Manuel Echavarria's artwork, it is important to have a concept of Colombia's long history of violence that extends itself into the present day. Since Echavarria's birth in 1947, Colombia has not seen a year of peace. Over the last half century, Colombian violence has remained the largest conflict in the Western Hemisphere, killing hundreds of thousands of civilians, and displacing millions of people. The victims of the ongoing violence are mostly poor and vulnerable citizens. Echavarria captures the violence that has pervaded his countryside throughout most of the 20th century in his artworks. A brief history of the different movements and groups since Echavarria's birth are listed as a backdrop to understand the perspective of the artist who provides viewers with such disturbing images.

=== La Violencia (1946–1957) ===
"La Violencia" is the name of a period of devastation in Colombia that arose because of the crisis of the coffee republic, the weakness of the government, and the dispute over property. The assassination of a popular radical politician, Gaitan, set off the large urban riots called the Bogotázo. The Bogotázo stormed the Presidential Palace and rioted against hunger and foreign businesses. Soon the persecuted poor civilians became a powerful authority by turning into insurgent revolutionaries backed by militias. However, a lack of leadership gave conservatives who sought to rid the nation of these liberals the opportunity to deploy death squads to crush any hint of opposition. The repressive conservative regime would send armed militia into the countryside to kill resistors. Often these militias would use certain kinds of corte, or cuts, to create terror and to send messages. Tens of thousands of people were burned, disemboweled, and thrown into rivers that ran red with blood. This mass slaughter resulted in more than 300,000 people killed, many of whom were peasant men.

=== Drug Trade (1980s-Early 1990s) ===
The weakness of a central government has plagued Colombia throughout its history. In the early 1980s the story was no different. The escalating violence and a climate of insecurity fostered the growth of privatized armed groups that took matters into their own hands because of their lack of confidence in the state. Two main guerrilla groups (FARC and ELN), as well as paramilitary forces, fought the state. Political identities became blurred, ultimately producing no "good guys." Violent human rights atrocities continued and were being financed by the illegal drug industry. Colombia had a monopoly over the drug industry, specifically cocaine and heroin, in the Western Hemisphere which provided economic fuel for all of the different political and guerrilla parties. Drug traffickers used several methods to export these drugs into the United States, which prompted the United States to wage a war on drugs in the early 1990s.

=== Rise of Paramilitary Groups (Late 1990s) ===
Money from drug trafficking allowed paramilitaries to develop extensive military capabilities. In the late 1990s, paramilitaries consolidated into a single coordinating body called the United Self-Defense Forces of Colombia that had national spokesmen who claimed to share political ideas. The paramilitaries became a valid and recognized part of government that stood against liberal ideology. Soon the paramilitaries began to increase troops and enforce combat squads that often resulted in massacres targeting civilian populations. This violence was once again a terror-filled way to control resources such as land, drug production, and trafficking routes.

== Selected works and exhibitions ==
=== Los Desaparecidos (The Disappeared) ===
In 2005 at the North Dakota Museum of Art, twenty seven artists' work from South America was shown to capture the meaning of "to disappear" during the 20th century military dictatorships in Latin America. During the 1970s, people who were considered a threat to the state were often killed or "disappeared." This term, disappear, became a word describing the people who had been killed without a trace. The artists who participated in this show were all in some way affected by this kind of violence. The curator, Laurel Reuter, hoped to portray the artists’ and their native countries' plight against these atrocities.

Echavarria's contribution was his photography collection entitled "NN (no name)" which included pictures of discarded and mangled mannequins abandoned in an old textile factory. He associated the mannequin bodies with those of the many mass graves and massacres which he witnessed growing up in Colombia. The different parts of the manniquin bodies that had been bashed or cut were synonymous to the long history of Colombia's violence in which mutilation of corpses was common. The bodies of the victims were and are often thrown into the river, and corpses that are rescued are buried under an anonymous cross with the letters NN, or no name.

Echavarria directly compares these identity-less mannequins which have been abandoned and destroyed with the nameless and pointless deaths of thousands of his countrymen. Since the viewer sees the mannequin as an anonymous figure, Echavarria points out how many Colombians die each year as senseless victims of violence. They are not killed because of their name or title, but for terror or warnings. Just as the mannequins do not have names or faces, neither do the countless who die each year.

=== Bocas de Ceniza (Mouths of Ashes) ===
In a series of videos, Echavarria shows the faces of people who are directly affected by or who have survived the massacres of the paramilitary forces and guerrilla warfare. Each person sings a song that he or she has written to help in getting through the pain and to recover from the violence that has berated the Colombian countryside. Some of the individuals in the videos are people who have been displaced by the violence and are trying to reclaim their identities as Colombian citizens.

Echavarria reminds the viewer with these videos that the conflicts in Colombia are still current. By seeing actual victims of the violence and hearing their tales of survival, one is shocked at how these massacres and displacements have become a normal occurrence in Colombia. The title of these videos, Bocas de Ceniza, is what the conquistadors called the mouth of the Magdalena River because of the day of its discovery: Ash Wednesday. Today, bodies are found floating in this river and other rivers on a regular basis. In naming this series of videos after the river in which dead are found, Echavarria allows the viewer to see the connection between the individuals portrayed as survivors of the massacre and their unfortunate relatives and friends whom they mourn through their mouths of song.

=== Corte de Florero (Flower Vase Cut) ===
In this series of photographs, Echavarria highlights the brutal traditional practice of mutilation that has occurred in Colombia's past where corpses are gruesomely manipulated or cut in different ways to send a message to opposing political groups. In the photographs, Echavarria arranges bones into flower patterns in order to construct a metaphor that is an evocation of the cuts of death. He asks, "What makes us perform such rituals with death? Is it that when there is so much death around you, and you are mutilating your victim, that you feel yourself to be a godlike personality- a puppeteer?"

By allowing the viewer to see the bones arranged as flowers that mimic the stylized killings of the paramilitary, Echavarria provides the viewer with an opportunity to gain an insight into the outrageous violence in Colombia. Showing the bones arranged as flowers mimicking a scientific classification dehumanizes them. Echavarria demonstrates how it is necessary for one to dislocate his mind from knowing he is killing another human being in order to commit such an atrocious act.

=== Death and the River ===
In 2006, Echavarria visited a cemetery near the Magdalena River in Colombia. A colorful mausoleum stood apart from others not only because of the vibrant colors, but also because the graves are marked with the letters NN, or no name. Like his photographs of the mannequins discussed earlier, the tombs represent bodies that were pulled out of the river because they were victims of the violent massacres that ravage the countryside. The people who save the bodies perform a ritual where they agree to take care of the NN tombs and to pray for their souls. In return, they will receive favors from the dead.

Echevarria's documentation of the NN mausoleum shows photographs of the close-ups of NN tombs. These close-ups give the viewer a chance to identify with the person who lies inside by recognizing that someone has taken the time to rescue an anonymous body from a river, and then to adopt and care for his soul. As Echavarria states, "Their pact with the dead resists the perpetrators of violence and reconstructs the social fabric." In showing the humanity of some citizens of Colombia, Echavarria directly contrasts the violence and inhumanity of others.

== Past solo exhibitions ==
2008

Death and the River, Josee Bienvenu Gallery, New York

2007

Bocas de Ceniza, Santa Fe Art Institute, Santa Fe, New Mexico

2006

The Witness, Josee Bienvenu Gallery, New York

Bocas de Ceniza, Americas Society, New York

Mouths of Ash, Weatherspoon Art Museum, Greensboro, North Carolina

Mouths of Ash, Fotofest, Houston, Texas

2005

Mouths of Ash, North Dakota Museum of Art, Grand Forks, North Dakota

2004

Guerra y Pa y Otras Series, Universidad Los Andes, Bogotá, Colombia

2003

Dos Hermanos y Guerra and Pa, Rainer Maria Remarque Center, European Media Art Festival, Ossanabruck, Germany

La Maria y Otras Series, La Tertulia Museum, Cali, Colombia

2001

Bocas de Ceniza, Ministerio de Educacion y Cultura, AECI, Montevideo, Uruguay

2000

Bandeja de Bolivar, Up & Co, New York

Bocas de Ceniza, Museum of Modern Art, Buenos Aires, Argentina

1999

Corte de Florero, Emison Art Center, DePauw University, Indiana

Escuela Nueva, Up & Co, New York

1998

Corte de Florero, B&B International Gallery, New York
