= Janie Geiser =

American artist (born 1957)

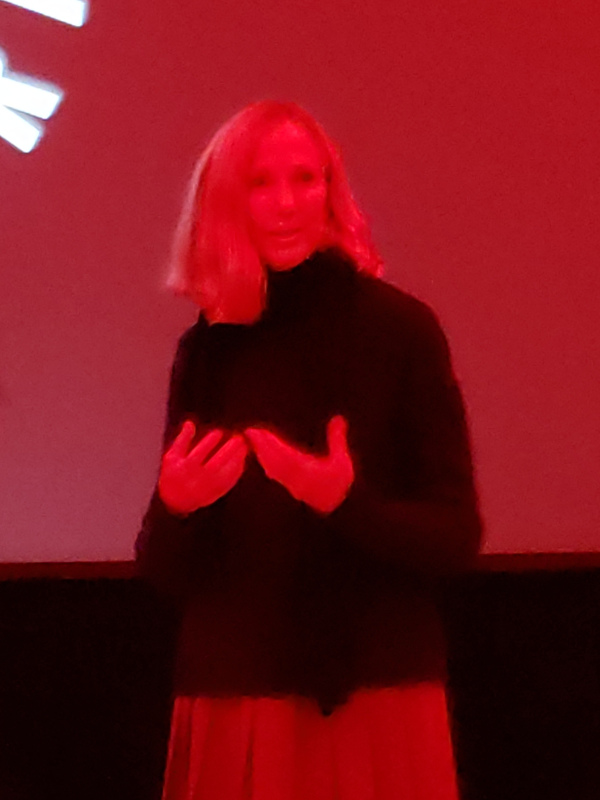
- Janie Geiser in November 2019
- Born: 1957 (age 68–69); Baton Rouge, Louisiana
- Education: University of Georgia
- Known for: Visual/Theater Artist, Experimental Filmmaker, Performance Art, Collage
- Notable work: The Fourth Watch, Terrace 49, The Red Book, The Secret Story, Colors, Immer Zu, Lost Motion, Clouded Sulphur
- Awards: 1989 Obie Award for Special Citation

Janie Geiser (born 1952 in Baton Rouge, Louisiana) is an American artist and experimental filmmaker. Her notable works include The Fourth Watch, Terrace 49, The Red Book, The Secret Story, Colors, Immer Zu, Lost Motion, and Clouded Sulphur.

== Biography ==
Janie Geiser was born in 1957 in Baton Rouge, Louisiana. She is the second oldest child among six total children. Janie Geiser attended the University of Georgia and graduated with a degree in visual art. While she is known as one of the pioneers of the renaissance of American avant-garde puppetry and object performance, she did not have any defining early experiences with puppetry. Upon completion her BFA degree, Geiser began creating work as a visual artist, exhibiting her drawings and paintings in Atlanta art galleries. By taking a job as the curator of a non-profit, multi-arts organization called Nexus, Geiser began to meet and collaborate with artists from many different fields, including music, dance, theater, and printmaking.

After her time at Nexus, Geiser took a part-time job in the 1980s as the curator of the Center for Puppetry Arts' puppet exhibits. It was at the Center for Puppetry Arts that she began to investigate both contemporary and historical puppetry, and she encountered a number of contemporary puppetry performers there, including Bruce Schwartz and Paul Zaloom. She created her first puppetry performance, Little Eddie, in the center's basement, and developed several works there under the name Jottay Theater, with puppeteers and musicians from Atlanta.

In 1986, Geiser moved to New York City where she founded "Janie Geiser and Co.", a collection of New York actors and puppeteers. She created a number of key works there, including Stories from Here (1986), developed with the Jottay Theater, including writer Neill Bogan and composer Chip Epsten. They were awarded an Obie for their production of Stories from Here at Dance Theater Workshop. Other shows included When the Wind Blows (1992), Evidence of Floods (1994–1996), Night Behind the Windows (1998) and more. She collaborated as a designer with other theater artists, including The Talking Band (The Three Lives of Lucie Cabrol, 1988), Dick Connette (Half a World Away, 1989), and Mac Wellman and Travis Preston (Infrared, 1990).

In 1990, Geiser also released the first of her three short puppet films, Royal Terror Theater. In the year 2000 Geiser received the Creative Capital Performing Arts Award. She also received the 2023 Stan Brakhage Vision Award at the Denver Film Festival.

Starting in 1992, Geiser began making short experimental films, a practice that continues through this day. Her performances often combine film and live performance. Her films have been screened at major museums including MOMA, the Whitney Museum, LACMA, SFMOMA, and others. Her films have screened at festivals including The New York Film Festival, London International Film Festival, Toronto International Film Festival, and others.

Around 2008 during the creation of her film, Ghost Algebra, Geiser experienced a strange health problem. She has a feeling of “electricity in her nerves”. Geiser visited all kinds of doctors, had an MRI, went to a neurologist, and what seemed to help the most was a combination of acupuncture and herbs. The cause of her health issue was never determined and symptoms still surfaces occasionally. This health issue served as an inspiration for her film, Ghost Algebra.

She is married to collage filmmaker Lewis Klahr.

== Major works / oeuvres ==
=== The Red Book (1994) ===
The Red Book is a collagic animated film in which Geiser describes The Red Book as “an elliptical, pictographic animated film that uses flat, painted figures and collage elements in both two- and three-dimensional settings to explore the realms of memory, language and identity from the point of view of a woman amnesiac.”

In 2009, it was selected to the United States National Film Registry.

=== Immer Zu (1997) ===
Immer Zu is an experimental animated short film written and directed by Geiser. The film is shot in black and white, and uses multiple mediums to achieve the animated effects, including two and three dimensional figures and sets, as well as shadow puppetry. The soundtrack was developed my combining music from several noir films.

Mark McElhatten writes in the program for the 1998 New York Film Festival: “The dark-meshed moires of the memory book in its pulp fiction edition forms obsidian riddles that cut time to ribbons. Life puts us in the critical condition of having to espionage with our own stolen recollection of events preserving them in a code often difficult to retrieve as it sinks into the limited access of the mental underworld.”

Online film magazine Film Threat called the film: “one of the few shorts at this year's festival, experimental or otherwise, which deserves more attention than it's getting. Geiser has made an extremely cryptic piece of highly original cut-out animation with a mystery and menace that recall David Lynch’s early shorts.”

=== The Fourth Watch (2000) ===
Like many of Geiser's films, the film was produced inside the filmmaker's own home. Geiser filmed the dollhouse in broad daylight giving the film a more natural light, but the shading from the leaves outside her window casts equivocal and dark shadows into the rooms. This film is composed of superimposed black and white film images from silent horror movies, which lay inside the interior of a 1940s tin dollhouse. The dollhouse was only a thrift store find but reminded the filmmaker of her own home. By shooting the dollhouse and rephotography sequences in-camera, an illusion of time is created by multiple characters crossing through the same space or gestures crossing through multiple rooms. Since Geiser used minimal markers when it came to making the video, much was left to be exposed to the elements. For example, some of the image flows over the border as if they were being produced by a projector on an unfitting screen. This condemns the film a non-traditional frame-by-frame shot, with figures illuminating towards off-screen spaces. The figures are fixated in one spot and are seemly haunted with carrying out their repeated actions.

=== Ultima Thule (2002) ===
Ultima Thule is a film that attempts to create a map of the terrain outside the borders of the known world, and the title is taken from the medieval name for this place. Geiser combines stop-motion animation, using objects such as dolls, toys, paper, and other found objects, along with re-photographed footage to tell the story of the survivors of a plane crash after it was swept into the sea during a storm. A young, mysterious girl becomes their guide to lead them to the next world. The mystery of the unknown is a major theme in the film, and the survivors are shown in a state of limbo, an ambiguous space between life and death. Footage used in the film is taken from Disney's Dumbo (1941) and Peter Pan (1953), along with clips from the Godzilla movie Ghidrah, the Three-Headed Monster (1964), all of which contain the narrative of wayward children and separation from their parents’ world. The way in which Geiser rephotographed the clips make them almost unrecognizable, and she does not cite the source material at any point during the film for both legal and aesthetic reasons.

=== Terrace 49 (2004) ===
The title of this piece was taken from the name of street in Los Angeles, suggesting to Geiser that it belongs to one of many terraces. The footage was derived from the 1960s cartoon series Fantastic Four, and was clipped during the moments of imminent doom—a telephone dangling from its hook, a truck approaching the cliffside, ropes quivering from unseen tension. Invisible Woman is the heroine of the series, yet her face is never exposed. Instead, she is seen when her body visibly turns “invisible”. Through different moments of Terrace 49, the filmmaker unveils the three modes of invisibility that describe Invisible Woman through the cartoon series. There are times that she is fully invisible, seen solely in the effects of the physical objects she touches; other moments when she is identified by a transparent outline of a figure; and lastly, when she is fully presented as a white and solid torso without any noticeable features. Halfway through the film, the ropes break and as one waits for the destruction, the truck is pulled into reverse and the disaster is inverted. Geiser is playing with the moment of suspense, when imagined death has arrived. She toggles the moment in between life and death, the space between the two realms.

=== The Spider’s Wheels (2006) ===
Geiser was inspired by the heroines in early film serials, known as the “serial queens,” along with the display of heightened feminine power in film throughout history and how they are reflected in political and cultural movements. The Spider’s Wheels is a cinematic diorama-installation combining projection, sculpture, and film. The piece is centered on the star of a fictitious serial about a female detective known as “The Spider.” Found footage of a contemporary actress playing a silent film star heroine is projected throughout the different areas of the installation. The projection areas include sculptural areas such as a Plexiglas box with metal flaps that serves as a silver screen, a wire mesh screen resembling a web that rises and falls in a three-minute cycle while the footage is projected onto it, and a staircase that leads to a door where the viewer must look through a peephole in order to view the scene.

== Automata ==
In 2004 Janie Geiser and Susan Simpson founded Automata, a non-profit organization in the Chinatown District of Los Angeles. Located at 504 Chung King Court, Automata is a center for “experimental puppet theater, experimental film, and other contemporary art practices centered on ideas of artifice and performing objects.” Automata has a specific interest in creating intimate shows for their viewers, emphasizing personal interactions with the crowd and allowing for dialogue and communication between the performers and the audience. At Automata, Geiser has teamed up with Erik Ehn, Trudi Cohen, Alma Sheppard-Matsuo, Severin Behnen, Jeanette Oi-Suk Yew, John Eckert and others.

== Archive ==
Geiser's film collection is held by the Academy Film Archive. The archive preserved her film The Secret Story in 2017.
