= Xiao Jiang =

Chinese film director

Xiao Jiang (Chinese: 小江; pinyin: Xiǎo Jiāng) (born 1972) is the stage name of female Chinese film director Jia Yan. Jia graduated from the Beijing Film Academy in 1995. Jia Yan worked primarily in television, directing three TV movies before joining the China Film Group as a screenwriter. In 2004, under the name of Xiao Jiang, she wrote and directed her debut film, Electric Shadows.

== Filmography ==
Year	English Title	Chinese Title	Notes
2004	Electric Shadows	梦影童年	Directorial debut
2007	PK.COM.CN	谁说青春不能错	
