= Rose Hobart =

American actress (1906–2000)

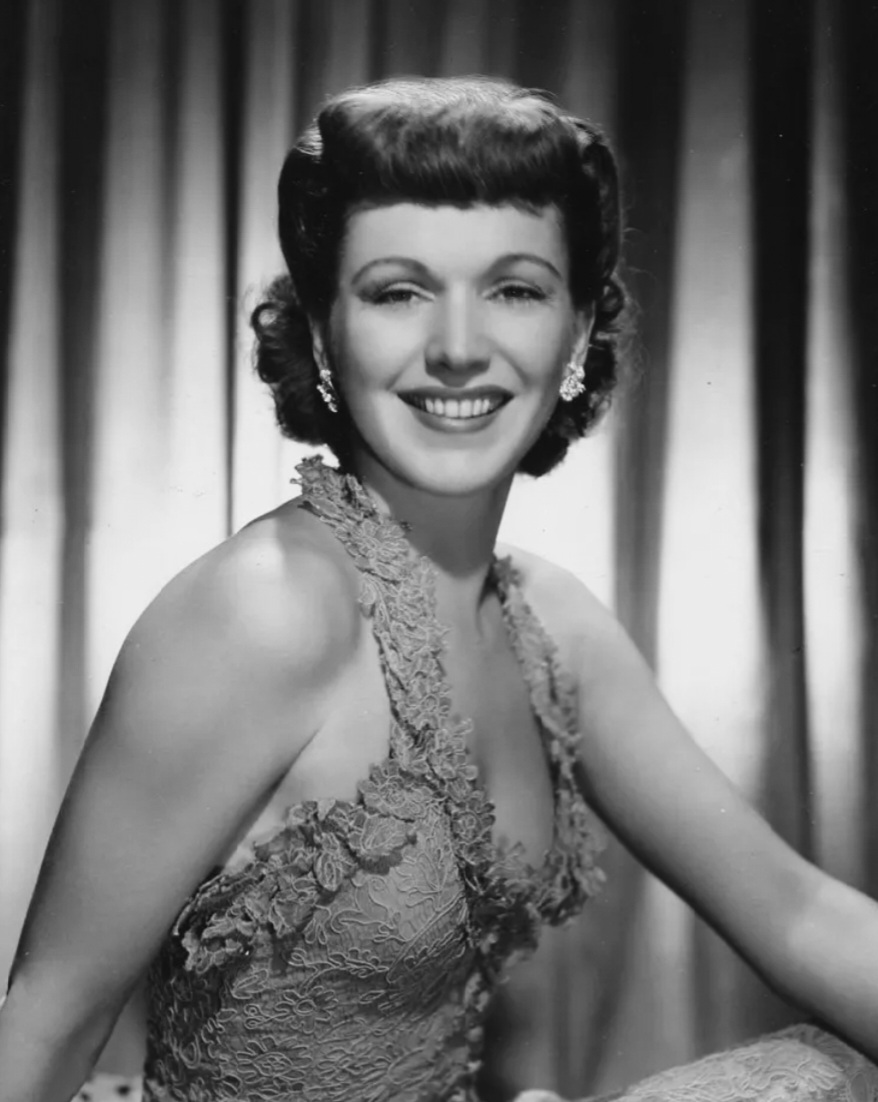
- Hobart in 1942
- Born: Rose Kefer; May 1, 1906; New York City, U.S.
- Died: August 29, 2000 (aged 94); Woodland Hills, California, U.S.
- Occupation: Actress
- Years active: 1923–1971
- Spouse(s): Benjamin Winter (m. 19??; div. 1929) William M. Grosvenor (m. 1932; div. 1941) Barton H. Bosworth (m. 1948; died 19??)
- Children: 1

Rose Hobart (born Rose Kefer; May 1, 1906 – August 29, 2000) was an American actress and a Screen Actors Guild official.

== Early years ==
Born in New York City, Hobart was the daughter of a cellist in the New York Symphony Orchestra, Paul Kefer, and an opera singer, Marguerite Kefer. Her parents' divorce when she was seven resulted in Hobart and her sister, Polly, going to France to live with their grandmother. When World War I began, they came back to the United States and went to boarding schools. By 1921, she was a student at Kingston High School in Kingston, New York.

== Career ==
When Hobart was 15, she debuted professionally in Cappy Ricks, a Chautauqua production. She was accepted for the 18-week tour because she told officials that she was 18. At that same age, she was cast in Ferenc Molnár's Liliom, which opened in Atlantic City, New Jersey. Hobart's Broadway stage debut was on September 17, 1923, at the Knickerbocker Theater, playing a young girl in Lullaby. In 1925, she played Charmian in Caesar and Cleopatra.

Hobart was an original member of Eva Le Gallienne's Civic Repertory Theatre. In 1928, she made her London debut, playing Nina Rolf in The Comic Artist. During her career in theater, she toured with Noël Coward in The Vortex and was cast opposite Helen Hayes in What Every Woman Knows.

Her performance as Grazia in Death Takes a Holiday won her a Hollywood contract. Hobart appeared in more than 40 motion pictures over a 20-year period. Under contract to Universal, Hobart starred in A Lady Surrenders (1930), East of Borneo (1931), and Scandal for Sale (1932). On loan to other studios, she appeared in Chances (1931) and Compromised (1931). In 1931, she co-starred with Fredric March and Miriam Hopkins in Rouben Mamoulian's original film version of Dr. Jekyll and Mr. Hyde (1931). She played the role of Muriel, Jekyll's fiancée.

In 1936, Surrealist artist Joseph Cornell, who bought a print of East of Borneo to screen at home, became smitten with the actress and cut out nearly all the parts that did not include her. He also showed the film at silent film speed and projected it through a blue-tinted lens. He named the resulting work Rose Hobart. Hobart often played the "other woman" in movies during the 1940s, with her last major film role in Bride of Vengeance (1949).

For the summer of 1938, Hobart appeared as the leading woman in the summer stock cast at the Elitch Theatre in Denver, Colorado, opposite Kent Smith as the leading man.

=== Politics ===
The House Un-American Activities Committee investigated Hobart in 1949, effectively ending her career. She believed that she first came to the attention of anti-Communist activists because of her commitment to improving working conditions for actors in Hollywood. In 1986, she recalled, "On my first three pictures, they worked me 18 hours a day and then complained because I was losing so much weight that they had to put stuff in my evening dress ... When I did East of Borneo (1931), that schlocky horror [film that] I did, we shot all night long. They started at 6 o'clock at night and finished at 5 in the morning. For two solid weeks, I was working with alligators, jaguars, and pythons out on the back lot. I thought, 'This is acting?' It was ridiculous. We were militant about the working conditions. We wanted an eight-hour day like everybody else."

Hobart also served on the board of the Screen Actors Guild and was an active participant in the Actors' Laboratory Theatre, a group which anti-Communists like Senator Joseph McCarthy claimed was subversive. In 1948, Hobart was subpoenaed to appear before the Tenney Committee on Un-American Activities. Although Hobart was not a member of the Communist Party, she refused to cooperate, instead reading a prepared statement that concluded, "In a democracy, no one should be forced or intimidated into a declaration of his principles. If one does yield to such pressure, he gives away his birthright. I am just mulish enough not to budge when anyone uses force on me." In 1950, Hobart was also listed in the anti-Communist blacklisting publication, Red Channels. Hobart never worked in film again, although she did work on stage, and later, as the blacklist eased in the 1960s, she took on television roles, including a part on Peyton Place.

=== Personal life ===
Hobart was married three times. Her first marriage, to Benjamin L. Winter, ended in divorce in 1929. On October 9, 1932, she married William Mason Grosvenor, Jr., an executive in a chemical engineering firm. They were divorced on February 17, 1941. She had one child, son Judson Bosworth, from her third marriage to architect Barton H. Bosworth.

=== Later years ===
In 1994, Hobart published her autobiography, A Steady Digression to a Fixed Point.

== Death ==
On August 29, 2000, Hobart died at the Motion Picture and Television Country House and Hospital in Woodland Hills, California, aged 94, from natural causes. She was survived by her only child, son Judson Bosworth (b. 1949).

== Filmography ==
=== Film ===
Year	Title	Role	Notes
1930	Liliom	Julie	
1930	A Lady Surrenders	Mabel 'Mike'	Isabel Beauvel
1931	Chances	Molly Prescott	
1931	East of Borneo	Linda Randolph	
1931	Compromised	Ann Brock	
1931	Dr. Jekyll and Mr. Hyde	Muriel Carew	
1932	Scandal for Sale	Claire Strong	
1933	The Shadow Laughs	Ruth Hackett	
1935	Convention Girl	Cynthia 'Babe' LaVal	
1939	Tower of London	Anne Neville	
1940	Wolf of New York	Peggy Nolan	
1940	Susan and God	Irene	
1940	A Night at Earl Carroll's	Ramona Lisa	
1941	Ziegfeld Girl	Mrs. Merton	
1941	Singapore Woman	Alice North	
1941	Lady Be Good	Mrs. Carter Wardley	
1941	I'll Sell My Life	Dale Layden (Mary Jones)	
1941	Nothing But the Truth	Mrs. Harriet Donnelly	
1941	No Hands on the Clock	Marion West	
1942	A Gentleman at Heart	Claire Barrington	
1942	Mr. and Mrs. North	Carol Brent	
1942	Who Is Hope Schuyler?	Alma Pearce	
1942	Gallant Lady	Rosemary Walsh	
1942	Dr. Gillespie's New Assistant	Mrs. Black	
1942	The Adventures of Smilin' Jack	Fraulein Von Teufel	
1943	Air Raid Wardens		(scenes deleted)
1943	Salute to the Marines	Mrs. Carson	(uncredited)
1943	Swing Shift Maisie	Lead Woman	(uncredited)
1943	The Mad Ghoul	Della	
1943	Crime Doctor's Strangest Case aka Strangest Case	Mrs. Diana Burns	
1944	Song of the Open Road	Mrs. Powell	
1944	The Soul of a Monster	Lilyan Gregg	
1945	The Brighton Strangler	Dorothy Kent	
1945	Conflict	Kathryn Mason	
1945	Isle of the Dead	Mrs. Mary St. Aubyn	(in long shot; uncredited)
1946	Claudia and David	Edith Dexter	
1946	The Cat Creeps	Connie Palmer	
1946	Canyon Passage	Marta Lestrade	
1947	The Farmer's Daughter	Virginia Thatcher	
1947	The Trouble With Women	Agnes Meeler	
1947	Cass Timberlane	Diantha Marl	
1948	Mickey	Lydia Matthews	(uncredited)
1949	Bride of Vengeance	Lady Eleonora	

=== Television ===
Year	Title	Role	Notes
1968	The Invaders	Housekeeper - Irma	1 episode
1968	Gunsmoke	Melanie Karcher	1 episode
1968–1969	The F.B.I.	Molly Ferguson / Maid	2 episodes
1971	Cannon	Nina's Mother	1 episode
1971	Night Gallery	Mrs. Hugo (segment "The Dear Departed")	1 episode; final appearance
