= Rose Hobart (film) =

- Directed by: Joseph Cornell
- Starring: Rose Hobart
- Release date: 1936
- Running time: 19 minutes
- Country: United States

Rose Hobart is a 1936 experimental collage film created by the artist Joseph Cornell, who cut and re-edited the Universal film East of Borneo (1931) into one of America's most famous surrealist short films. Cornell was fascinated by the star of East of Borneo, an actress named Rose Hobart, and named his short film after her. The piece consists of snippets from East of Borneo combined with shots from a documentary film of an eclipse.

== Creation ==
By chance, Cornell bought a 16mm print of East of Borneo at a junk shop. To make the 77-minute film less tedious for repeated viewings by himself and his brother, Cornell would occasionally cut some parts, rearrange others, or add pieces of nature films, until it was condensed to its final length of 19 minutes, mostly featuring shots of the lead actress, with whom Cornell had become obsessed.

== Screenings ==
When Cornell screened the film, he projected it through a piece of blue glass and slowed the speed of projection to that of a silent film. Cornell removed the original soundtrack and added "Porto Alegre" and "Belem Bayonne", two songs from Nestor Amaral's 1957 album Holiday in Brazil, a record that Cornell had also found at a junk shop.

The film was first shown in 1936 at Julien Levy's New York City gallery in a matinee program featuring short films from Cornell's collection. The program, which Levy called "Goofy Newsreels", took place around the same time as the first exhibition of surrealist art at the Museum of Modern Art.

Salvador Dalí was in the audience, but halfway through the film, he knocked over the projector in a rage. “My idea for a film is exactly that, and I was going to propose it to someone who would pay to have it made,” he said. "I never wrote it down or told anyone, but it is as if he had stolen it." Other versions of Dalí's accusation tend to the more poetic: "He stole it from my subconscious!" or even "He stole my dreams!"

After the Dalí incident, Cornell did not screen the film publicly again until 1963, when, at the behest of Jonas Mekas, it was shown at the Gramercy Arts Theatre in New York. When the first print was made from Cornell's original in 1969, Cornell chose a 'rose' tint instead of the normal blue.

== Critical reception and accolades ==
Rose Hobart is now part of Anthology Film Archives' Essential Cinema Repertory collection. In 2001, it was selected for preservation in the United States National Film Registry by the Library of Congress as being "culturally, historically, or aesthetically significant". It was also among J. Hoberman's ten votes in both the 2002 and 2012 Sight & Sound polls of the world's greatest films.

== Influence ==
Hilary Radner and Moya Luckett consider Blonde Cobra to be a camp portrayal of Rose Hobart.

== See also ==
- Treasures from American Film Archives
- A Movie
