= Joseph Cornell =

American artist and filmmaker (1903–1972)

- Cornell in 1971
- Born: December 24, 1903; Nyack, New York, US
- Died: December 29, 1972 (aged 69); New York City, US
- Education: Self-taught
- Known for: Assemblage, experimental film, sculpture

Joseph Cornell (December 24, 1903 – December 29, 1972) was an American visual artist and filmmaker, one of the pioneers and most celebrated exponents of assemblage. Influenced by the Surrealists, he was also an avant-garde experimental filmmaker. He was largely self-taught in his artistic efforts, and improvised his own original style incorporating cast-off and discarded artifacts. He lived most of his life in relative physical isolation, caring for his mother and his disabled brother at home, but remained aware of and in contact with other contemporary artists.

== Life ==
Joseph Cornell was born in Nyack, New York, to Joseph Cornell, a textiles industry executive, and Helen Ten Broeck Storms Cornell, who had trained as a nursery teacher. Both parents came from socially prominent families of Dutch ancestry, long-established in New York State. Cornell's father died April 30, 1917, leaving the family in straitened circumstances. Following the elder Cornell's death, his widow and children moved to the borough of Queens in New York City. Cornell attended Phillips Academy in Andover, Massachusetts, in the class of 1921. Although he reached the senior year, he did not graduate. Following this, he returned to live with his family.

Except for the three-and-a-half years he spent at Phillips, he lived for most of his life in a small, wood-frame house on Utopia Parkway in a working-class area of Flushing, along with his mother and his brother Robert, whom cerebral palsy had rendered physically disabled.

== Art practice ==
=== Sculpture and collage ===
Joseph Cornell Untitled (Dieppe) c. 1958, Museum of Modern Art, (New York City).

Cornell's most characteristic art works were boxed assemblages created from found objects. Many of his shadow boxes, such as the famous Medici Slot Machine boxes, are interactive and are meant to be handled.

Like Kurt Schwitters, Cornell could create poetry from the commonplace. Unlike Schwitters, however, he was fascinated not by refuse, garbage, and the discarded, but by fragments of once beautiful and precious objects he found on his frequent trips to the bookshops and thrift stores of New York. His boxes relied on the Surrealist use of irrational juxtaposition, and on the evocation of nostalgia, for their appeal.

Cornell often made series of boxed assemblages that reflected his various interests: the Soap Bubble Sets, the Medici Slot Machine series, the Pink Palace series, the Hotel series, the Observatory series, and the Space Object Boxes, among others. Also captivated with birds, Cornell created an Aviary series of boxes, in which colorful images of various birds were mounted on wood, cut out, and set against harsh white backgrounds.

In addition to creating boxes and flat collages and making short art films, Cornell also kept a filing system of over 160 visual-documentary "dossiers" on themes that interested him; the dossiers served as repositories from which Cornell drew material and inspiration for boxes like his "penny arcade" portrait of Lauren Bacall. He had no formal training in art, although he was extremely well-read and was conversant with the New York art scene from the 1940s through to the 1960s.

His methodology is described in a monograph by Charles Simic as:

Somewhere in the city of New York there are four or five still-unknown objects that belong together. Once together they'll make a work of art. That's Cornell's premise, his metaphysics, and his religion. ... Marcel Duchamp and John Cage use chance operation to get rid of the subjectivity of the artist. For Cornell it's the opposite. To submit to chance is to reveal the self and its obsessions.

In his later years, Cornell utilized the help of assistants to create his artworks. These assistants included both local art students and practicing artists such as Larry Jordan and Terry Shutté. He greatly enjoyed working with young artists and teaching them his methods and art practices.

=== Experimental film ===
Joseph Cornell's 1936 found-film montage Rose Hobart was made entirely from splicing together existing film stock that Cornell had found in New Jersey warehouses, mostly derived from a 1931 "B" film entitled East of Borneo. Cornell would play Nestor Amaral's record Holiday in Brazil during its rare screenings, as well as projecting the film through a deep blue glass or filter, giving the film a dreamlike effect. Focusing mainly on the gestures and expressions made by Rose Hobart (the original film's starlet), this dreamscape of Cornell's seems to exist in a kind of suspension until the film's most arresting sequence toward the end, when footage of a solar eclipse is juxtaposed with a white ball falling into a pool of water in slow motion.

Cornell premiered the film at the Julien Levy Gallery in December 1936 during the first Surrealist exhibition at the Museum of Modern Art (MoMA) in New York. Salvador Dalí, who was in New York to attend the MoMA opening, was present at its first screening. During the screening, Dalí became outraged at Cornell's movie, claiming he had just had the same idea of applying collage techniques to film. After the screening, Dalí remarked to Cornell that he should stick to making boxes and stop making films. Traumatized by this event, the shy, retiring Cornell showed his films rarely thereafter.

Joseph Cornell continued to experiment with film until his death in 1972. While his earlier films were often collages of found short films, his later ones montaged together footage he expressly commissioned from the professional filmmakers with whom he collaborated. These latter films were often set in some of Cornell's favorite neighborhoods and landmarks in New York City: Mulberry Street, Bryant Park, Union Square Park, and the Third Avenue Elevated Railway, among others.

In 1969 Cornell gave a collection of both his own films and the works of others to Anthology Film Archives in New York City.

==== Selected filmography ====
- Rose Hobart (1936)
- Children's Party (c. 1940)
- Cotillion (c. 1940)
- The Midnight Party (c. 1940)
- The Aviary (1955)
- Gnir Rednow (1956) (made with Stan Brakhage)
- Mulberry Street (1957)
- Boys' Games (1957)
- Centuries of June (1955) (made with Stan Brakhage)
- Nymphlight (1957)
- Flushing Meadows (c. 1965) (made with Larry Jordan)
- A Legend for Fountains (1957–1965)
- Bookstalls (1973)
- By Night with Torch and Spear (1979)

== Exhibitions ==
Cornell's first major museum retrospective, curated by legendary museum director Walter Hopps, was entitled An Exhibition of Works by Joseph Cornell. It opened at the Pasadena Art Museum (now the Norton Simon Museum) in December 1966, then traveled to the Solomon R. Guggenheim Museum in New York.

- In 1970, the Metropolitan Museum of Art in New York mounted the second major museum retrospective of his collages, curated by the well-known Henry Geldzahler.
- In 1972, A Joseph Cornell Exhibition for Children was held at a gallery at Cooper Union which was a show he arranged especially for children, with the boxes displayed at child height and with the opening party serving soft drinks and cake. Another retrospective was held at the Albright-Knox in 1972.
- His fourth major museum retrospective was in 1980 at MoMA, part of a series of exhibitions celebrating its 50th anniversary.
- His fifth major museum retrospective was in 2007 at SFMOMA, which traveled to the Smithsonian American Art Museum and the Peabody Essex Museum.
- His sixth major museum retrospective was in 2015 at the Royal Academy of Arts in London, which traveled to Kunsthistorisches Museum in Vienna.

In 2018, the Metropolitan Museum of Art exhibited Birds of a Feather: Joseph Cornell's Homage to Juan Gris. The exhibit focused on Cornell's series of Gris shadow boxes and featured Gris's The Man at the Café, Cornell's inspiration for the shadow boxes.

From December 16, 2025, to March 14, 2026, Gagosian and film director Wes Anderson displayed a recreation of Cornell's studio, The House of Utopia Parkway: Joseph Cornell's Studio Re-Created by Wes Anderson, in Gagosian's Paris gallery.

== Collections ==
- Museum of Modern Art, New York
- Guggenheim Museum, New York
- Smithsonian American Art Museum
- Menil Collection
- Art Institute of Chicago
- San Francisco Museum of Modern Art
- Whitney Museum of American Art
- Tate Museum, London
- Philadelphia Museum of Art
- Museo Reina Sofia, Madrid
- Los Angeles Museum of Contemporary Art
- Albright-Knox Art Gallery
- Los Angeles County Museum of Art, Los Angeles
- National Gallery of Art, Washington, DC
- Dallas Museum of Art, Dallas, Texas
- Pérez Art Museum Miami, Florida

== Art market ==
Sold from the estate of Edwin and Lindy Bergman, Chicago-based collectors and art patrons, Cornell's Untitled (Penny Arcade Portrait of Lauren Bacall) (1946) fetched $5.3 million at Christie's New York, setting an auction record for the artist. The jewel-like box, with images of Bacall on blue background, was inspired by To Have and Have Not, a film starring Bacall and Humphrey Bogart.

== Personal life ==
Cornell was wary of strangers. This led him to isolate himself and become a self-taught artist. Although he expressed attraction to unattainable women like Lauren Bacall, his shyness made romantic relationships almost impossible. In later life his bashfulness verged toward reclusiveness, and he rarely left the state of New York. However, he preferred talking with women, and often made their husbands wait in the next room when he discussed business with them. He also had numerous friendships with ballerinas, who found him unique, but too eccentric to be a romantic partner.

He devoted his life to caring for his younger brother Robert, who was disabled and lived with cerebral palsy, which was another factor in his lack of relationships. At some point in the 1920s, or possibly earlier, he read the writings of Mary Baker Eddy, including Science and Health with Key to the Scriptures. Cornell considered Eddy's works to be among the most important books ever published after the Bible, and he became a lifelong Christian Science adherent. Christian Science belief and practice informed Cornell's art deeply, as art historian Sandra Leonard Starr has shown.

He was also rather poor for most of his life, working during the 1920s as a wholesale fabric salesman to support his family. As a result of the American Great Depression, Cornell lost his textile industry job in 1931, and worked for a short time thereafter as a door-to-door appliance salesman. During this time, through her friendship with Ethel Traphagen, Cornell's mother secured him a part-time position designing textiles. In the 1940s, Cornell also worked in a plant nursery (which would figure in his famous dossier "GC44") and briefly in a defense plant, and designed covers and feature layouts for Harper's Bazaar, View, Dance Index, and other magazines. He only really began to sell his boxes for significant sums after his 1949 solo show at the Charles Egan Gallery.

Cornell eventually began a passionate, but platonic, relationship with Japanese artist Yayoi Kusama while she was living in New York in the mid-1960s. She was twenty-six years his junior; they would call each other daily, sketch each other, and he would send personalized collages to her. Their lengthy association lasted even after her return to Japan, ending only with his death in 1972.

== Death ==
Cornell's brother Robert died in 1965, and his mother in 1966. Joseph Cornell died of apparent heart failure on December 29, 1972, a few days after his sixty-ninth birthday. The executors of his estate were Richard Ader and Wayne Andrews, as represented by the art dealers Leo Castelli, Richard Feigen, and James Corcoran. Later, the Joseph and Robert Cornell Memorial Foundation was established, which administers the copyrights of Cornell's works and represents the interests of his heirs. Currently, the Foundation is administered by Trustees Richard Ader and Joseph Erdman.

== In popular culture ==
- Octavio Paz's poem "Objects and Apparitions" is an ekphrastic poem about viewing Joseph Cornell's shadow boxes. Paz says (in Elizabeth Bishop's translation), "Joseph Cornell: inside your boxes / my words became visible for a moment."
- Anne Tyler's Celestial Navigation (1974) is a fictional riff on being Joseph Cornell.
- The cyberpunk novelist William Gibson uses the finding of mysterious boxes similar to those by Joseph Cornell as a narrative element in his novel Count Zero (1984).
- The Dutch pop band The Nits released a song, "Soap Bubble Box", on their 1992 album Ting, about seeing some of Cornell's boxes in the Museum of Modern Art in New York City. The song was a minor hit in the Netherlands.
- Scholarship on Joseph Cornell’s art and life led to Michael Brayndick’s dissertation Joseph Cornell and the Dialectics of Human Time; and inspired Brayndick's 1999 play, How to Make a Rainbow, with workshop performances in: New York (1998), Connecticut (2000), and the UK (2003), and the world premiere production by On the Spot Theatre at the Greenhouse Theater Center in Chicago (2013).
- In 1992, poet Charles Simic published a prose collection inspired by and with images of the work of Joseph Cornell: Dime-Store Alchemy: The Art of Joseph Cornell (published by New York Review Books, originally published by Hopewell, N.J.: Ecco Press).
- Singer-songwriter Mary Chapin Carpenter imagines Cornell going about his creative life in the song "Ideas Are Like Stars", on her 1996 album A Place in the World.
- The English band The Clientele has a song titled "Joseph Cornell" on the group's 2001 album Suburban Light.
- The American novelist and short story writer Robert Coover published a series of stories entitled The Grand Hotels (of Joseph Cornell) in 2002. Akin to short fables, the stories refer to various themes and images in Cornell's Hotel series of boxes.
- Charles L. Mee's play Hotel Cassiopeia (2006) is based on the life of Joseph Cornell.
- Singer/songwriter Thomas Comerford released the album Archive + Spiral in 2011 which contains the song titled "Joseph Cornell". The song is described as less of an homage and more of a meditation on the mood the artist invokes.

== See also ==
- Haptic poetry
- Bricolage
