= 2001 Toronto International Film Festival =

Annual Canadian film festival

- Festival poster
- Opening film: Last Wedding
- Location: Toronto, Ontario, Canada
- Hosted by: Toronto International Film Festival Group
- No. of films: 326 films
- Festival date: September 6, 2001–September 15, 2001
- Language: English
- Website: tiff.net
- 2002 2000

The 26th Toronto International Film Festival ran from September 6 to September 15, 2001. There were 326 films (249 feature films, 77 short films) from 54 countries scheduled to be screened during the ten-day festival. During a hastily arranged press conference on September 11, Festival director Piers Handling and managing director Michelle Maheux announced that 30 public screenings and 20 press screenings would be cancelled during the sixth day of the festival due to the September 11, 2001 attacks in New York City and Washington, D.C. The festival resumed for the final four days though some films were cancelled because the film prints could not reach Toronto due to flight restrictions.

== Awards ==
Award	Film	Director
People's Choice Award	Amélie	Jean-Pierre Jeunet
Discovery Award	Chicken Rice War	Chee Kong Cheah
Best Canadian Feature Film	Atanarjuat: The Fast Runner	Zacharias Kunuk
Best Canadian First Feature Film	Inertia	Sean Garrity
Best Canadian Short Film	FILM(dzama)	Deco Dawson
FIPRESCI International Critics' Award	Inch'Allah Dimanche	Yamina Benguigui
FIPRESCI International Critics' Award - Special Mention	Be My Star (Mein Stern)	Valeska Grisebach
FIPRESCI International Critics' Award - Special Mention	Khaled	Asghar Massombagi

== Programme ==
=== Viacom Galas ===
- Dark Blue World by Jan Svěrák
- Enigma by Michael Apted
- From Hell by Albert Hughes and Allen Hughes
- Hearts in Atlantis by Scott Hicks
- Lantana by Ray Lawrence
- The Last Kiss by Gabriele Muccino
- Last Orders by Fred Schepisi
- Last Wedding by Bruce Sweeney
- Life as a House by Irwin Winkler
- Monsoon Wedding by Mira Nair
- No Man's Land by Danis Tanovic
- Novocaine by David Atkins
- Serendipity by Peter Chelsom
- Taking Sides by István Szabó
- That Love (Cet Amour-là) by Josée Dayan
- Tosca by Benoît Jacquot
- Training Day by Antoine Fuqua
- Triumph of Love by Clare Peploe

=== Canadian Open Vault ===
- The Grey Fox by Phillip Borsos

=== Contemporary World Cinema ===
- À ma soeur! by Catherine Breillat
- Abandoned by Árpád Sopsits
- Absolutely Fabulous (Absolument fabuleux) by Gabriel Aghion
- Address Unknown by Kim Ki-duk
- All About Lily Chou-Chou by Shunji Iwai
- Après la réconciliation by Anne-Marie Miéville
- Asoka by Santosh Sivan
- Ball in the House by Tanya Wexler
- Baran by Majid Majidi
- Beijing Bicycle by Wang Xiaoshuai
- The Believer by Henry Bean
- Big Bad Love by Arliss Howard
- Birthday Girl by Jez Butterworth
- Brainstorm by Laís Bodanzky
- Broken Silence by Montxo Armendáriz
- The Business of Strangers by Patrick Stettner
- C'est la vie by Jean-Pierre Améris
- La Ciénaga by Lucrecia Martel
- La Commune (Paris, 1871) by Peter Watkins
- The Daughter of Keltoum by Mehdi Charef
- The Days Between by Maria Speth
- Deathrow by Joel Lamangan
- Delbaran by Abolfazl Jalili
- Distance by Hirokazu Kore-Eda
- A Dog's Day by Murali Nair
- Drift by Michiel van Jaarsveld
- Dust by Milcho Manchevski
- Eden by Amos Gitaï
- L'Emploi du temps by Laurent Cantet
- The Fluffer by Richard Glatzer and Wash West
- Get a Life by João Canijo
- The Grey Zone by Tim Blake Nelson
- Harmful Insect by Akihiko Shiota
- Hi, Tereska by Robert Glinski
- The Hired Hand by Peter Fonda
- Honey For Oshún by Humberto Solás
- How Harry Became a Tree by Goran Paskaljević
- Hush! by Ryosuke Hashiguchi
- Ignorant Fairies by Ferzan Özpetek
- Jan Dara by Nonzee Nimibutr
- The Jimmy Show by Frank Whaley
- Kissing Jessica Stein by Charles Herman-Wurmfeld
- Lagaan by Ashutosh Gowariker
- Le Lait de la tendresse humaine by Dominique Cabrera
- Lan Yu by Stanley Kwan
- Late Marriage by Dover Kosashvili
- Latitude Zero by Toni Venturi
- Light of My Eyes by Giuseppe Piccioni
- Loco Fever by Andrés Wood
- Loin by André Téchiné
- Lovely & Amazing by Nicole Holofcener
- Lovely Rita by Jessica Hausner
- The Man from Elysian Fields by George Hickenlooper
- Manic by Jordan Melamed
- Margarita Happy Hour by Ilya Chaiken
- Markova: Comfort Gay by Gil M. Portes
- Maya by Digvijay Singh
- Mirror Image by Hsiao Ya-chuan
- Musa - The Warrior by Kim Sung-su
- My Kingdom by Don Boyd
- Nine Queens by Fabián Bielinsky
- No Shame by Joaquín Oristrell
- The Only Journey of His Life by Lakis Papastathis
- The Orphan of Anyang by Wang Chao
- Otilia by Dana Rotberg
- Passport by Péter Gothár
- Pauline et Paulette by Lieven Debrauwer
- Piñero by Leon Ichaso
- Le Pornographe by Bertrand Bonello
- The Quickie by Sergei Bodrov
- Quitting by Zhang Yang
- Rain by Christine Jeffs
- Reines d'un jour by Marion Vernoux
- Revolution#9 by Tim McCann
- The Road by Darezhan Omirbaev
- Samsara by Pan Nalin
- Secret Ballot by Babak Payami
- Sex and Lucia by Julio Médem
- Silent Partner by Alkinos Tsilimidos
- Sisters by Sergei Bodrov Jr.
- Slogans by Gjergj Xhuvani
- Strumpet by Danny Boyle
- To End All Wars by David L. Cunningham
- Tuesday by Geoff Dunbar
- Under the Skin of the City by Rakhshan Bani Etemad
- Unfinished Song by Maziar Miri
- Vacuuming Completely Nude In Paradise by Danny Boyle
- Violet Perfume by Maryse Sistach
- Waterboys by Shinobu Yaguchi
- What Time Is It There? by Tsai Ming-liang
- Y tu mamá también by Alfonso Cuarón
- The Zookeeper by Ralph Ziman
- Zus & Zo by Paula van der Oest

=== Dialogues: Talking with Pictures ===
- Exterminating Angel by Luis Buñuel
- The Killing by Stanley Kubrick
- Rollerball by Norman Jewison
- Two-Lane Blacktop by Monte Hellman
- Wild Strawberries by Ingmar Bergman

=== Spotlight: Ulrich Seidl ===
- Animal Love by Ulrich Seidl
- Dog Days by Ulrich Seidl
- Loss Is To Be Expected by Ulrich Seidl
- Models by Ulrich Seidl

=== Discovery ===
- Absolute Hundred by Srdan Golubović
- Asuddelsole by Pasquale Marrazzo
- The Bank by Robert Connolly
- Be My Star by Valeska Grisebach
- Blue Spring by Toyoda Toshiaki
- Bread and Milk by Jan Cvitkovič
- Deep Breath by Damien Odoul
- The Butterfly by Moon Seung-wook
- Le Café de la plage by Benoît Graffin
- Chicken Rice War by Chee Kong Cheah
- Everybody Says I'm Fine! by Rahul Bose
- Happy Man by Malgorzata Szumowska
- Magonia by Ineke Smits
- Mostly Martha by Sandra Nettelbeck
- Mr In-Between by Paul Sarossy
- La Spagnola by Steve Jacobs

=== Jean Pierre Lefebvre: Vidéaste ===
- L'Âge des images I: Le Pornolithique by Jean Pierre Lefebvre
- L'Âge des images II: L'Écran invisible by Jean Pierre Lefebvre
- L'Âge des images III: Comment filmer Dieu by Jean Pierre Lefebvre
- L'Âge des images IV: Mon chien n'est pas mort by Jean Pierre Lefebvre
- L'Âge des images V: La Passion de l'innocence by Jean Pierre Lefebvre
- The House of Light (La Chambre blanche) by Jean Pierre Lefebvre
- Le jour S... by Jean Pierre Lefebvre
- My Friend Pierrette (Mon amie Pierrette) by Jean Pierre Lefebvre
- The Old Country Where Rimbaud Died (Le Vieux pays où Rimbaud est mort) by Jean Pierre Lefebvre

=== Masters ===
- Éloge de l'amour by Jean-Luc Godard
- L' Anglaise et le duc by Éric Rohmer
- Buñuel and King Solomon's Table by Carlos Saura
- The Diaries of Vaslav Nijinsky by Paul Cox
- Je rentre à la maison by Manoel de Oliveira
- Millennium Mambo by Hou Hsiao-hsien
- Mulholland Drive by David Lynch
- The Navigators by Ken Loach
- La Pianiste by Michael Haneke
- The Profession of Arms by Ermanno Olmi
- Pulse by Kiyoshi Kurosawa
- The Son's Room by Nanni Moretti
- The Sun Behind the Moon by Mohsen Makhmalbaf
- Trouble Every Day by Claire Denis
- Warm Water Under a Red Bridge by Shōhei Imamura

=== Midnight Madness ===
- The American Astronaut by Cory McAbee
- Antinome by Grégory Morin
- Bang Rajan The Legend of the Village Warriors by Thanit Jitnukul
- The Bunker by Rob Green
- Clip Cult (Vol. 1) by Chris Cunningham, Hiroyuki Nokomo, Kouji Morimoto, Spike Jonze, Michel Gondry, Mark Adcock and Antoine Bardou Jaquet
- Dogtown and Z-Boys by Stacy Peralta
- Eat by Bill Plympton
- Electric Dragon 80,000 V by Sogo Ishii
- Full Time Killer by Johnnie To and Wai Ka-Fai
- Ichi the Killer by Takashi Miike
- Le Pacte des loups by Christophe Gans
- Versus by Ryuhei Kitamura

=== National Cinema Programme ===
- As White as in Snow by Jan Troell
- Cabin Fever by Mona J. Hoel
- Cool and Crazy by Knut Erik Jensen
- Earth by Veikko Aaltonen
- Elling by Petter Næss
- Fiasco by Ragnar Bragason
- Gossip by Colin Nutley
- The Icelandic Dream by Róbert I. Douglas
- Italian for Beginners by Lone Scherfig
- Jalla! Jalla! by Josef Fares
- Kira's Reason - A Love Story by Ole Christian Madsen
- Ode to a Hunter by Per Fronth
- The River by Jarmo Lampela
- A Song for Martin by Bille August
- You Really Got Me by Pål Sletaune

=== Perspective Canada ===
- Black Soul by Martine Chartrand
- 1:1 by Richard Reeves
- After by Byron Lamarque
- Un Arbre avec un chapeau by Pascal Sanchez
- The Art of Woo by Helen Lee
- Century Hotel by David Weaver
- Charlie Noir by Keith Davidson
- Cyberman by Peter Lynch
- FILM(dzama) by Deco Dawson
- The Frank Truth by Rick Caine
- A Fresh Start by Jason Buxton
- The Green by Paul Carrière
- I Shout Love by Sarah Polley
- In Memoriam by Aubrey Nealon
- Inertia by Sean Garrity
- Inséparables by Normand Bergeron
- Instant Soup by Bridget Hill
- Jean Laliberté: A Man, His Vision and a Whole Lot of Concrete by Philippe Falardeau
- The Judgment by Serge Marcotte
- Khaled by Asghar Massombagi
- Lilith on Top by Lynne Stopkewich
- Lip Service: A Mystery by Ann Marie Fleming
- Lola by Carl Bessai
- Lollipops by Graham Tallman
- Mariages by Catherine Martin
- On Their Knees by Anais Granofsky
- Rare Birds by Sturla Gunnarsson
- Remembrance by Stephanie Morgenstern
- Romain et Juliette by Frédéric Lapierre
- Scènes d'enfants by Lara Fitzgerald
- Self: (Portrait/Fulfillment) A Film By the Blob Thing by Brian Stockton
- Sight Under Construction by John Kneller
- Silent Song by Elida Schogt
- Soft Shell Man by André Turpin
- Soowitch by Jean-François Rivard
- Strange Invaders by Cordell Barker
- Suddenly Naked by Anne Wheeler
- Tar Angel by Denis Chouinard
- Three Sisters on Moon Lake by Julia Kwan
- The Topic of Cancer by Ramiro Puerta
- Touch by Jeremy Podeswa
- Treed Murray by William Phillips
- Walk Backwards by Laurie Maria Baranyay
- Westray by Paul Cowan
- The Woman Who Drinks by Bernard Émond

=== Planet Africa ===
- É Minha Cara by Thomas Allen Harris
- 100 Days by Nick Hughes
- L'Afrance by Alain Gomis
- Bintou by Fanta Regina Nacro
- The Father by Ermias Woldeamlak
- Inch'Allah Dimanche by Yamina Benguigui
- Karmen Geï by Joseph Gaï Ramaka
- The Killing Yard by Euzhan Palcy
- Malunde by Stefanie Sycholt
- Mouka by Adama Roamba
- Paris: XY by Zeka Laplaine
- Snipes by Richard Murray
- Surrender by Celine Gilbert

=== Real to Reel ===
- Carving Out Our Name by Tony Zierra
- El Caso Pinochet by Patricio Guzmán
- Chop Suey by Bruce Weber
- Digital Short Films by Three Filmmakers: In Public by Jia Zhangke, Digitopia by John Akomfrah and A Conversation With God by Tsai Ming-liang
- Facing the Music by Bob Connolly and Robin Anderson
- Fidel by Estela Bravo
- Grateful Dawg by Gillian Grisman
- Hell House by George Ratliff
- How's Your News? by Arthur Bradford
- It's About Time by Ayelet Menahemi and Elona Ariel
- James Ellroy's Feast of Death by Vikram Jayanti
- Japanese Devils by Minoru Matsui
- Missing Young Woman by Lourdes Portillo
- Much Ado About Something by Michael Rubbo
- Nazareth 2000 by Hany Abu-Assad
- Okie Noodling by Bradley Beesley
- Privé by Heddy Honigmann
- Promises by Justine Shapiro, B.Z. Goldberg and Carlos Bolado
- The Struma by Simcha Jacobovici
- The Universal Clock: The Resistance of Peter Watkins by Geoff Bowie
- Warrior of Light by Monika Treut

=== Special Presentations ===
- Atanarjuat: The Fast Runner by Zacharias Kunuk
- Buffalo Soldiers by Gregor Jordan
- La Chambre des officiers by François Dupeyron
- Christmas Carol: The Movie by Jimmy T. Murakami
- Comment j'ai tué mon père by Anne Fontaine
- The Devil's Backbone by Guillermo del Toro
- Emil and the Detectives by Franziska Buch
- Le Fabuleux Destin d'Amélie Poulain by Jean-Pierre Jeunet
- Focus by Neal Slavin
- Heist by David Mamet
- Hotel by Mike Figgis
- In the Bedroom by Todd Field
- Joy Ride by John Dahl
- Ma femme est une actrice by Yvan Attal
- Nosferatu, A Symphony of Horror by F. W. Murnau
- Picture Claire by Bruce McDonald
- Prozac Nation by Erik Skjoldbjærg
- The Safety of Objects by Rose Troche
- Sidewalks of New York by Edward Burns
- Sur mes lèvres by Jacques Audiard
- Tape by Richard Linklater
- Thirteen Conversations About One Thing by Jill Sprecher
- Waking Life by Richard Linklater
- Who is Cletis Tout? by Chris Ver Wiel
- World Traveler by Bart Freundlich

=== Wavelengths ===
- ATOZ by Robert Breer
- Automatic Writing by Fred Worden
- Baby Dream II by Miles McKane
- The Back Steps by Leighton Pierce
- Color Study by Vincent Grenier
- Les Coquelicots by Rose Lowder
- The Dark Room (2001 short film)|The Dark Room by Minyong Jang
- The Deformation of the Setting Sun by Joseph Leclerc
- Didam by Olivier Fouchard and Mahine Rouhi
- Emanance by Craig A. Lindley
- Engram Sepals (Melodramas 1994–2000) by Lewis Klahr
- Exposed (2001 short film)|Exposed by Siegfried A. Fruhauf
- Interior: New York Subway, 14th Street to 42nd Street by G.W. (Billy) Bitzer
- Intrude Sanctuary by Hsiao Shuo-wen
- L'Iris fantastique by Segundo de Chomón
- The Last Lost Shot by Cécile Fontaine
- Love's Refrain by Nathaniel Dorsky
- Lovesong (2001 American film)|Lovesong by Stan Brakhage
- Marisa (film)|Marisa by Jacopo Quadri
- Fog (2000 film)|Mist by Matthias Müller
- Nipkow TV by Christian Hossner
- Outermost by Stephanie Maxwell and Allan Schindler
- Post Mortem (2001 film)|Post Mortem by Catherine Tanitte
- Premières images II by Étienne-Jules Marey
- Le Roi des dollars by Segundo de Chomón
- Schichtwechsel by Christian Hossner
- Serpentine Dance by Annabelle by W.K.L. Dickson and William Heise
- Shudder (Top and Bottom) by Michael Gitlin
- Sliding Off the Edge of the World by Mark Street
- Slit Scan Movie by Christian Hossner
- Soundings (film)|Soundings by Sandra Gibson
- Tree-line by Gunvor Nelson
- Trees in Autumn by Kurt Kren
- Wot the Ancient Sod by Diane Kitchen

== Canada's Top Ten ==
In December 2001, TIFF introduced the Canada's Top Ten project to identify the year's ten best Canadian films as selected by festival programmers and film critics from across Canada.

- Atanarjuat: The Fast Runner by Zacharias Kunuk
- Ginger Snaps by John Fawcett
- The Heart of the World by Guy Maddin
- Khaled by Asghar Massombagi
- Last Wedding by Bruce Sweeney
- Marriages by Catherine Martin
- Parsley Days by Andrea Dorfman
- Soft Shell Man by André Turpin
- The Woman Who Drinks by Bernard Émond
- The Uncles by James Allodi
