= 2012 Toronto International Film Festival =

37th annual film festival held in Toronto, Canada

- Festival poster
- Opening film: Looper
- Closing film: Song for Marion
- Location: Toronto, Ontario, Canada
- Awards: Silver Linings Playbook (People's Choice Award)
- Hosted by: Toronto International Film Festival Group
- No. of films: 289 feature films and 83 shorts
- Festival date: September 6, 2012–September 16, 2012
- Language: English
- Website: tiff.net
- 2013 2011

The 37th annual Toronto International Film Festival (TIFF) was held in Toronto, Ontario, Canada between September 6 and September 16, 2012. TIFF announced the films that were accepted on August 21, 2012. On its 37th edition the TIFF included a 289 feature films and 83 short films. Directed by Rian Johnson, Looper was selected as the opening film.

== Awards ==
Award	Film	Director
People's Choice Award	Silver Linings Playbook	David O. Russell
People's Choice Award, First Runner Up	Argo	Ben Affleck
People's Choice Award, Second Runner Up	Zaytoun	Eran Riklis
People's Choice Award (Documentary)	Artifact	Jared Leto
People's Choice Award (Documentary), First Runner Up	Storm Surfers 3D	Christopher Nelius, Justin McMillan
People's Choice Award (Documentary), Second Runner Up	Revolution	Rob Stewart
People's Choice Award (Midnight Madness)	Seven Psychopaths	Martin McDonagh
People's Choice Award (Midnight Madness), First Runner Up	The Bay	Barry Levinson
People's Choice Award (Midnight Madness), Second Runner Up	John Dies at the End	Don Coscarelli
Best Canadian Feature Film	Laurence Anyways	Xavier Dolan
Best Canadian Short Film	Keep a Modest Head (Ne crâne pas sois modeste)	Deco Dawson
Best Canadian Short Film, Honorable Mention	Crackin' Down Hard	Mike Clattenburg
Best Canadian First Feature Film	Antiviral	Brandon Cronenberg
Best Canadian First Feature Film	Blackbird	Jason Buxton
FIPRESCI Discovery	Call Girl	Mikael Marcimain
FIPRESCI Special Presentations	In the House	François Ozon
NETPAC Award	The Land of Hope	Sion Sono

On 17 September 2012, it was announced that David O. Russell's romantic comedy-drama film, Silver Linings Playbook, had been awarded the People's Choice Award. The film, in which Bradley Cooper and Jennifer Lawrence appear as "neurotic lovers obsessed with their exes", is based on a novel by Matthew Quick. The festival director, Piers Handling, stated that the film is "a deeply emotional story." Ben Affleck's Argo was the runner-up for the prize. Jared Leto's Artifact was given the People's Choice Award for best documentary, while Martin McDonagh's Seven Psychopaths won the Midnight Madness audience award.

== Programme ==
=== Gala Presentations ===
- Argo by Ben Affleck
- The Company You Keep by Robert Redford
- Dangerous Liaisons by Hur Jin-ho
- Emperor by Peter Webber
- English Vinglish by Gauri Shinde
- Free Angela & All Political Prisoners by Shola Lynch
- Great Expectations by Mike Newell
- Hyde Park on Hudson by Roger Michell
- Inescapable by Ruba Nadda
- Jayne Mansfield's Car by Billy Bob Thornton
- Looper by Rian Johnson
- Love, Marilyn by Liz Garbus
- Midnight's Children by Deepa Mehta
- The Reluctant Fundamentalist by Mira Nair
- A Royal Affair by Nikolaj Arcel
- Silver Linings Playbook by David O. Russell
- Song for Marion by Paul Andrew Williams
- Thermae Romae by Hideki Takeuchi
- Twice Born by Sergio Castellitto
- What Maisie Knew by Scott McGehee and David Siegel

=== Special Presentations ===
- Anna Karenina by Joe Wright
- Antiviral by Brandon Cronenberg
- Arthur Newman by Dante Ariola
- At Any Price by Ramin Bahrani
- The Attack by Ziad Doueiri
- Bad 25 by Spike Lee
- Byzantium by Neil Jordan
- Capital by Costa-Gavras
- Cloud Atlas by Tom Tykwer, Andy Wachowski and Lana Wachowski
- The Deep by Baltasar Kormákur
- Disconnect by Henry Alex Rubin
- Do Not Disturb by Yvan Attal
- Dormant Beauty by Marco Bellocchio
- Dreams for Sale by Nishikawa Miwa
- End of Watch by David Ayer
- Everybody Has A Plan by Ana Piterbarg
- Foxfire by Laurent Cantet
- Frances Ha by Noah Baumbach
- Ginger & Rosa by Sally Potter
- Greetings from Tim Buckley by Dan Algrant
- Hannah Arendt by Margarethe von Trotta
- The Hunt by Thomas Vinterberg
- The Iceman by Ariel Vromen
- Imogene by Robert Pulcini and Shari Springer Berman
- The Impossible by J.A. Bayona
- In the House by François Ozon
- Inch'Allah by Anaïs Barbeau-Lavalette
- Kon-Tiki by Joachim Rønning and Espen Sandberg
- The Last Supper by Lu Chuan
- A Late Quartet by Yaron Zilberman
- Laurence Anyways by Xavier Dolan
- A Liar's Autobiography — The Untrue Story of Monty Python's Graham Chapman by Ben Timlett
- Lines of Wellington by Valeria Sarmiento
- Liverpool by Manon Briand
- Lore by Cate Shortland
- Love is All You Need by Susanne Bier
- The Master by Paul Thomas Anderson
- Mr. Pip by Andrew Adamson
- Much Ado About Nothing by Joss Whedon
- No by Pablo Larraín
- On The Road by Walter Salles
- Outrage Beyond by Takeshi Kitano
- The Paperboy by Lee Daniels
- Passion by Brian De Palma
- The Perks of Being a Wallflower by Stephen Chbosky
- The Place Beyond the Pines by Derek Cianfrance
- Quartet by Dustin Hoffman
- Reality by Matteo Garrone
- War Witch (Rebelle) by Kim Nguyen
- Rhino Season by Bahman Ghobadi
- Rust and Bone by Jacques Audiard
- The Sapphires by Wayne Blair
- The Sessions by Ben Lewin
- The Son Did It by Daniele Ciprì
- Spring Breakers by Harmony Korine
- Still by Michael McGowan
- Stories We Tell by Sarah Polley
- The Suicide Shop by Patrice Leconte
- Tai Chi by Stephen Fung
- Thanks for Sharing by Stuart Blumberg
- Thérèse Desqueyroux by Claude Miller
- The Time Being by Nenad Cicin-Sain
- To the Wonder by Terrence Malick
- Venus and Serena by Maiken Baird
- White Elephant by Pablo Trapero
- Writers by Josh Boone
- Yellow by Nick Cassavetes
- Zaytoun by Eran Riklis

=== Documentaries ===
- 9.79* - Daniel Gordon
- A World Not Ours - Mahdi Fleifel
- The Act of Killing - Joshua Oppenheimer
- Artifact - Bartholomew Cubbins
- As if We Were Catching a Cobra - Hala Alabdalla
- Camp 14–Total Control Zone - Marc Wiese
- The Central Park Five - Ken Burns, David McMahon and Sarah Burns
- Far Out Isn't Far Enough: The Tomi Ungerer Story - Brad Bernstein
- First Comes Love - Nina Davenport
- The Gatekeepers - Dror Moreh
- The Girl from the South - José Luis García
- How to Make Money Selling Drugs - Matthew Cooke
- Iceberg Slim: Portrait of a Pimp - Jorge Hinojosa
- London – The Modern Babylon - Julien Temple
- Lunarcy! - Simon Ennis
- Mea Maxima Culpa: Silence in the House of God - Alex Gibney
- Men At Lunch - Seán Ó Cualáin
- More Than Honey - Markus Imhoof
- No Place on Earth - Janet Tobias
- Reincarnated - Andrew Capper
- Revolution - Rob Stewart
- Roman Polanski: Odd Man Out - Marina Zenovich
- The Secret Disco Revolution - Jamie Kastner
- Shepard & Dark - Treva Wurmfeld
- Show Stopper: The Theatrical Life of Garth Drabinsky - Barry Avrich
- State 194 - Dan Setton
- Storm Surfers 3D - Christopher Nelius, Justin McMillan
- The Walls of Dakar - Abdoul Aziz Cissé

=== Midnight Madness ===
- The ABCs of Death - Multiple directors
- Aftershock - Nicolás López
- The Bay - Barry Levinson
- Come Out and Play - Makinov
- Dredd - Pete Travis
- Hellbenders - JT Petty
- John Dies at the End - Don Coscarelli
- The Lords of Salem - Rob Zombie
- No One Lives - Ryuhei Kitamura
- Seven Psychopaths - Martin McDonagh

=== Vanguard ===
- 90 Minutes - Eva Sørhaug
- Beijing Flickers - Zhang Yuan
- Berberian Sound Studio - Peter Strickland
- Blondie - Jesper Ganslandt
- Here Comes the Devil - Adrian Garcia Bogliano
- I Declare War - Jason Lapeyre and Robert Wilson
- iLL Manors - Ben Drew
- Motorway - Soi Cheang
- Painless - Juan Carlos Medina
- Peaches Does Herself - Peaches
- Pusher - Luis Prieto
- Room 237 - Rodney Ascher
- Sightseers - Ben Wheatley
- Thale - Aleksander Nordaas
- The We and the I - Michel Gondry

=== Contemporary World Cinema ===
- 3 - Pablo Stoll Ward
- After the Battle - Yousry Nasrallah
- All That Matters Is Past - Sara Johnsen
- Baby Blues - Katarzyna Rosłaniec
- Barbara - Christian Petzold
- Bwakaw - Jun Robles Lana
- Camion - Rafaël Ouellet
- Children of Sarajevo - Aida Begic
- Clandestine Childhood - Benjamín Ávila
- Comrade Kim Goes Flying - Anja Daelemans
- The Cowards Who Looked to the Sky - Yuki Tanada
- The Cremator - Peng Tao
- Crimes of Mike Recket - Bruce Sweeney
- Dead Europe - Tony Krawitz
- Dust - Julio Hernández Cordón
- Eagles - Dror Sabo
- Fin - Jorge Torregrossa
- The Fitzgerald Family Christmas - Edward Burns
- Fly with the Crane - Li Ruijun
- Ghost Graduation - Javier Ruiz Caldera
- God Loves Caviar - Yannis Smaragdis
- Gone Fishing - Carlos Sorín
- The Great Kilapy - Zézé Gamboa
- A Hijacking - Tobias Lindholm
- Him, Here, After - Asoka Handagama
- The Holy Quaternity - Jan Hřebejk
- Home Again - Sudz Sutherland
- Imagine - Andrzej Jakimowski
- In the Fog - Sergei Loznitsa
- In the Name of Love - Luu Huynh
- Jackie - Antoinette Beumer
- Jump - Kieron J. Walsh
- Just the Wind - Bence Fliegauf
- Juvenile Offender - Yikwan Kang
- Key of Life - Kenji Uchida
- Kinshasa Kids - Marc-Henri Wajnberg
- The Land of Hope - Sion Sono
- The Lesser Blessed - Anita Doron
- Middle of Nowhere - Ava DuVernay
- Museum Hours - Jem Cohen
- My Awkward Sexual Adventure - Sean Garrity
- Once Upon a Time Was I, Verônica - Marcelo Gomes
- Paradise: Love - Ulrich Seidl
- The Patience Stone - Atiq Rahimi
- Penance - Kioshi Kurosawa
- Peripeteia - John Akomfrah
- Road North - Mika Kaurismäki
- Shores of Hope - Toke Constantin Hebbeln
- Sleeper's Wake - Barry Berk
- Smashed - James Ponsoldt
- The Thieves - Choi Dong-hoon
- Three Kids - Jonas d'Adesky
- Three Worlds - Catherine Corsini
- Thy Womb - Brillante Mendoza
- The Tortoise, An Incarnation - Girish Kasaravalli
- Underground: The Julian Assange Story - Robert Connolly
- Virgin Margarida - Licínio Azevedo
- Watchtower - Pelin Esmer
- A Werewolf Boy - Jo Sung-hee
- What Richard Did - Lenny Abrahamson
- When I Saw You - Annemarie Jacir
- Zabana! - Saïd Ould Khelifa

=== Masters ===
- Amour - Michael Haneke
- Beyond the Hills (Dupa Dealuri) - Cristian Mungiu
- The End of Time - Peter Mettler
- Everyday - Michael Winterbottom
- Gebo and the Shadow (Gebo et l'ombre) - Manoel de Oliveira
- In Another Country (Da-Reun Na-ra-e-suh) - Hong Sang-soo
- Like Someone in Love - Abbas Kiarostami
- Me and You - Bernardo Bertolucci
- Night Across the Street (La Noche de Enfrente) - Raúl Ruiz
- Pietà - Kim Ki-duk
- Something in the Air (Après mai) - Olivier Assayas
- Student - Darezhan Omirbayev
- Tout ce que tu possèdes (All That You Possess) - Bernard Émond
- When Day Breaks - Goran Paskaljevic

=== City To City: Mumbai ===
- The Bright Day - Mohit Takalkar
- Gangs of Wasseypur - Part 1 - Anurag Kashyap
- Gangs of Wasseypur - Part 2 - Anurag Kashyap
- Ishaqzaade - Habib Faisal
- Miss Lovely - Ashim Ahluwalia
- Mumbai's King - Manjeet Singh
- Peddlers - Vasan Bala
- Shahid - Hansal Mehta
- Shanghai - Dibakar Banerjee
- Ship of Theseus - Anand Gandhi

=== TIFF Kids ===
- Ernest & Célestine - Benjamin Renner
- Finding Nemo 3D - Andrew Stanton
- Hotel Transylvania - Genndy Tartakovsky
- Igor & the Cranes' Journey - Evgeny Ruman

=== TIFF Cinematheque ===
- The Bitter Ash - Larry Kent
- The Cloud Capped Star - Ritwik Ghatak
- Dial M for Murder - Alfred Hitchcock
- Loin du Viêtnam - Joris Ivens, William Klein, Claude Lelouch, Agnès Varda, Jean-Luc Godard, Chris Marker, Alain Resnais
- Stromboli - Roberto Rossellini
- Tess - Roman Polanski

=== Discovery ===
- 7 Boxes - Juan Carlos Maneglia
- Augustine - Alice Winocour
- Blackbird - Jason Buxton
- Blancanieves - Pablo Berger
- Boy Eating the Bird's Food - Ektoras Lygizos
- The Brass Teapot - Ramaa Mosley
- Burn It Up - Djassa Lonesome Solo
- Call Girl - Mikael Marcimain
- Clip - Maja Miloš
- The Color of the Chameleon - Emil Christov
- The Deflowering of Eva van End - Michiel ten Horn
- Detroit Unleaded - Rola Nashef
- Eat Sleep Die - Gabriela Pichler
- Fill the Void - Rama Burshtein
- The Interval - Leonardo Di Costanzo
- Janeane from Des Moines - Grace Lee
- Krivina - Igor Drljaca
- The Land of Eb - Andrew Williamson
- Mushrooming - Toomas Hussar
- Nights with Theodore - Sébastien Betbeder
- Our Little Differences - Sylvie Michel
- Out in the Dark - Michael Mayer
- Picture Day - Kate Mellville
- Satellite Boy - Catriona McKenzie
- La Sirga - William Vega
- Tower - Kazik Radwanski
- Wasteland - Rowan Athale

=== Short Cuts Canada ===
- 100 Musicians - Charles Officer
- A Pretty Funny Story - Evan Morgan
- American Sisyphus - Frieda Luk
- Asian Gangs - Lewis Bennett and Calum MacLeod
- Aubade (L'Aubade) - Carla Susanto
- Bardo Light - Connor Gaston
- Barefoot - Danis Goulet
- Broken Heart Syndrome - Dusty Mancinelli
- Bydlo - Patrick Bouchard
- CanoeJacked - Jonathan Williams
- Crackin' Down Hard - Mike Clattenburg
- The Dancing Cop - Kelvin Redvers
- Dear Scavengers - Aaron Phelan
- Frost - Jeremy Ball
- The Genius from Quintino - Johnny Ma
- Herd Leader (Chef de meute) - Chloé Robichaud
- H'Mong Sisters - Jeff Wong
- Horrible Things (Les choses horrible) - Vincent Biron
- How to Be Deadly - Nik Sexton
- I'm Beginning to Miss You - Sakay Ottawa
- Joda - Theodore Ushev
- Keep a Modest Head (Ne crâne pas sois modeste) - Deco Dawson
- Let the Daylight Into the Swamp - Jeffrey St. Jules
- Life Doesn't Frighten Me - Stephen Dunn
- Lingo - Bahar Noorizadeh
- Lost in Motion - Ben Shirinian
- Malody - Philip Barker
- Model - Dylan Reibling
- The Near Future (Le futur proche) - Sophie Goyette
- Nostradamos - Maxence Bradley
- Old Growth - Tess Girard
- The Pool Date - Patrick Sisam
- Reflexions - Martin Thibaudeau
- Safe Room - Elizabeth Lazebnik
- Shit Girls Say - Graydon Sheppard and Kyle Humphrey
- Struggle (Faillir) - Sophie Dupuis
- Sullivan's Applicant - Jeanne Leblanc
- The Tape - Matt Austin
- Their Feast (Waleematehom) - Reem Morsi
- Tuesday - Fantavious Fritz
- Vive la Canadienne - Joe Cobden
- When You Sleep - Ashley McKenzie
- With Jeff (Avec Jeff, à moto) - Marie-Ève Juste
- The Worst Day Ever - Sophie Jarvis

== Canada's Top Ten ==
=== Features ===
- Cosmopolis, David Cronenberg
- The End of Time, Peter Mettler
- Goon, Michael Dowse
- Laurence Anyways, Xavier Dolan
- Midnight's Children, Deepa Mehta
- My Awkward Sexual Adventure, Sean Garrity
- War Witch (Rebelle), Kim Nguyen
- Still Mine, Michael McGowan
- Stories We Tell, Sarah Polley
- The World Before Her, Nisha Pahuja

=== Short films ===
- Bydlo, Patrick Bouchard
- Crackin' Down Hard, Mike Clattenburg
- Herd Leader (Chef de meute), Chloé Robichaud
- Kaspar, Diane Obomsawin
- Keep a Modest Head (Ne crâne pas sois modeste), Deco Dawson
- Lingo, Bahar Noorizadeh
- Malody, Phillip Barker
- Old Growth, Tess Girard
- Reflexions, Martin Thibaudeau
- Wintergreen (Paparmane), Joëlle Desjardins Paquette
