= 2008–2009 neo-Nazi murders of Roma in Hungary =

Serial murders of Roma people in Hungary by far-right terrorists

- Conviction: Murder x6
- Penalty: Life imprisonment (Árpád Kiss, István Kiss, Zsolt Pető); 13 years imprisonment (István Csontos)

Details
- Victims: 6
- Span of crimes: 2008–2009
- Country: Hungary
- States: Hajdú-Bihar, Pest, Szabolcs-Szatmár-Bereg, Heves, Borsod-Abaúj-Zemplén
- Date apprehended: August 21, 2009

The 2008–2009 neo-Nazi murders of Roma in Hungary were a series of murders perpetrated by four Neo-Nazis (Árpád Zoltán Kiss, István Sándor Kiss, Zsolt István Pető and accomplice István Csaba Csontos) against people of Roma ethnicity, occurring between July 2008 and August 2009.

The perpetrators had previously obtained firearms and Molotov cocktails after robbing a house in Besenyszög, using them in numerous attacks in 10 locations, killing six people in the process. The subsequent investigation revealed that the gang were skinheads from Debrecen, and their motive was retaliation for crimes committed by Roma and a desire to incite anti-Roma sentiment among the ethnic Hungarian population.

All four were arrested on August 21, 2009, at a nightclub in Debrecen, where two of them worked as bouncers. The criminal proceedings began on March 25, 2011, and lasted until August 6, 2013. Árpád Kiss, István Kiss and Zsolt Pető were sentenced to life imprisonment, while István Csontos was a given a 13-year sentence without a chance of parole, with an expected release date of August 2022.

== Case overview ==
=== Pretext ===
From the very beginning, the four men planned the crimes in advance, selecting several sites which received high media coverage because of past incidents involving the Roma and non-Roma population.

The weapons used to carry out the attacks were acquired from a robbery on March 7, 2008. On that day, the Kisses and Pető, who were aided by an unidentified accomplice, broke into the home of a hunter in Besenyszög, who had previously offered to sell them his Franchi M610 VSL. Presenting themselves as police officers, they tied up the occupants with duct tape, threatening them with two objects that resembled real guns. The robbers scavenged the hunter's weapon cabinet, taking the following items: a 7x64mm Mauser rifle with a Swarovski Optik scope, a 12x76mm Fabarm MAX2 Bock sporting rifle, a 12x76mm Franchi M610 VSL semi-automatic shotgun, a FÉG Bock shotgun, an IZS-58 MHE shotgun, a 22mm BRNO M2E hunting rifle, a 16x70mm 158 type rifle and two double-barrel shotguns.

After the robbery, the gang began to plan and scout their locations from an apartment on Poroszlay Street in Debrecen. The vehicle used for the attacks was an Opel Astra belonging to Árpád Kiss' wife, which initially had its license plate covered, but later was replaced by fakes manufactured by István Kiss' girlfriend, Edit.

=== Attacks ===
==== Debrecen ====
In preparation for the crimes, the gang decided to hold a practise shooting. On June 2, 2008, after midnight, Árpád Kiss fired several shots at the refugee camp in Debrecen with one of the rifles.

==== Galgagyörk ====
Galgagyörk was chosen as the first location because there had been previous clashes between the ethnic Hungarian and Roma communities, which were heavily reported in the press. More specifically, the men learned of it from a report on Echo TV about an ethnic Hungarian family being driven out of their homes and the involvement of the Magyar Gárda. While the people who had forced the family to leave were never identified, the gang nevertheless decided to opt for an attack on the local Roma community.

On July 21, 2008, the Kisses and Pető opened fire on several residential buildings and breaking several windows. While several people, including minors, were present during the attacks, no injuries were reported. The attack was considered a failure, as the press erroneously considered that this might have been caused by a local feud between residents.

==== Piricse ====
Due to the lack of media coverage, the perpetrators considered the Galgagyörk attack to be a failure. This led Árpád and István Kiss to plan another one, and on August 7, 2008, the two of them met with Zsolt Pető to plan their next move, agreeing that they strike in Piricse. The trio got into a car and drove towards their destination, stopping at Encsencs to change the license plate. On the night of August 8, 2008, Molotov cocktails were thrown at two houses on Ady Endre Street and a shotgun shot fired through the window of one building. One of the sleeping occupants, Magdolna Gyetyinás, left the house to check out what was going on, causing István Kiss to shoot her with one of the shotguns, hitting her in the leg and elbow. During their escape, the trio fired several more shots at the houses.

==== Nyíradony ====
On the night of September 5, 2008, Árpád Kiss carried out another attack by himself in Nyíradony, using the Mauser rifle to penetrate the window of a house on Jázmin Street in the Tamásipuszta section of the village. Two adults and their four children, in addition to the victim's mother and three minor siblings and brothers, were present in the building, but none were harmed. While they had woken up from the attacks, they decided to wait for the attacker to leave, refraining from switching the lights on as to not draw attention.

==== Tarnabod ====
During their next meeting on September 27, the main trio planned another attack, this time in Tarnabod, where it was reported that some Roma had murdered an elderly man. In addition to their usual armament and clothing, they also carried with themselves VHF radios to keep in contact.

Two days later, at midnight, Zsolt Pető threw two Molotov cocktails at a house on Tarna Street, one at the wall and the other at a window, before firing at it with his Fabarm. Meanwhile, the Kisses threw their cocktails at another house, before all three fled towards Tarna Creek. Along the way, they shot at another victim who was standing by the window in his home, but failed to hit him. In total, five buildings were shot at or had Molotov cocktails thrown at them, but miraculously none of the residents had been harmed.

Despite the attackers' intentions, they had unknowingly attacked ethnic Hungarian residents living in the village, as that neighborhood was populated mainly by elderly women.

==== Nagycsécs ====
On November 3, 2008, the trio attacked two houses on György Dózsa Street in Nagycsécs. One of the buildings was occupied by a married couple and their mentally handicapped, deaf-mute child and the homeowner's physically disabled brother; the other had another couple and their two minor children.

Árpád Kiss had stationed himself at a field with his Mauser, covering for István Kiss and Zsolt Pető, who were throwing cocktails at the building. The noise caused the occupants of the buildings to wake up and start extinguishing the flames. The attackers shot and killed József and Tiborné Nagy on the spot, and severely wounded the other man from the adjacent building.

A peculiarity noticed by investigators was that, despite István Csontos not being present during this attack, footprints from a fourth person were found at the crime scene, whose identity has not been established to this day.

==== Alsózsolca ====
Another attack was carried out on December 15, 2008, on Pista Dankó Street in Alsózsolca, with the targets being an 18-year-old and a 16-year-old chopping firewood near their home. Árpád Kiss shot at the 18-year-old from the other side of the Sajó river with his Mauser, missing him, but instead piercing through his companion's clothing. He fired another shot, hitting the older victim in the hip area and causing him to collapse. Despite his life-threatening condition, he was rescued, but was left permanently disabled from his injuries.

==== Tatárszentgyörgy ====
In 2007, a conflict occurred between ethnic Hungarian and Roma residents in Tatárszentgyörgy, leading to intervention from the Magyar Gárda and members of the National Guard, a right-wing paramilitary organization demanding for the segregation of Romas from ethnic Hungarians. This stunt subsequently led to the organization being outlawed by the government. Because of his incident, the gang chose Tatárszentgyörgy as their next target.

On February 23, 2009, the trio arrived in front of a house on Fenyves Street, occupied by 29-year-old Róbert Csorbá, his wife and three children. Árpád Kiss hid himself in the trees while his two cohorts attacked head on, with Zsolt Pető throwing two Molotov cocktails into the attic and walls, causing them to light on fire. When Csorba noticed the fire, he picked up two of his children and ran towards the patio door. He was seen by István Kiss, who fired at the terrace twice with his Franchi, fatally hitting Róbert and his 4-year-old son, Robika, and seriously injuring the daughter Bianká, who fled back towards the house.

==== Tiszalök ====
In this incident, the three main perpetrators were joined for the first time by István Csontos, who knew of the previous attacks and wanted to participate due to his anti-Romani convictions, acting as their getaway driver. Unlike the previous times, Zsolt Pető was not present during the attack in Tiszalök. While Árpád and István Kiss were committing the crime, Csontos waited in nearby Polgár, returning to the crime scene to pick up the brothers and then leave.

Tiszalök was chosen due a 2008 parade organized by the National Guard, and the subsequent counter-protest by the Roma community. The attack took place on April 22, 2009, at 10PM, with Árpád, who was hiding in some nearby grass, opening fire with his shotgun at a house on Nefelejcs Street. This caused the homeowner, Jenö Kóka, to try and flee via the yard, but was seen by the attackers, who shot at him with their rifles, hitting him in the chest and killing him on the spot.

Prior to the murder, police assured the public that they could cordon off the county in a maximum of ten minutes. However, an hour and a half after the murder, one of the Kiss brothers phoned Csontos and told him to pick them up. Csontos was stopped on the way by police officers, but despite having an empty guitar case, military binoculars, maps and a radio in his car, Csontos was let go by the officer and was not questioned further. Ten minutes later, he picked up the brothers from a nearby railway embankment and they all drove away from the area. On the way back, the car got stuck in mud on a dirt road, making Árpád Kiss make a phone call to his partner, Évá N., to help them out (this call would later be used to track down the killers). Évá N. went there in the early hours with her own car, picked up the trio and drove them back to Debrecen, with them returning the next day with a farmer, whom they had asked to help tow their car away with his tractor. This happened only 40 kilometers away from the crime scene.

==== Kisléta ====
The last known attack occurred in Kisléta on August 3, 2009. On that night, the Kiss brothers and Zsolt Pető approached a house on Bocskai Street from the fields, while István Csontos returned to Debrecen with the car until he would be called back to pick his associates.

After approaching the front door, two of them kicked it down and broke inside, where Pető fired at the doorframes with his Fabarm. They then went to the bedroom and opened fire at the two people they found lying in bed. The mother, Mária Balogh, was killed on the spot, while her daughter, Ketrin, who was hiding behind her mother, survived. After the incident, she was left with permanent brain damage.

After the attack in Kisléta, police patrols were increased in the area, so one of the men began carrying around a pistol, in case a shoot-out with police occurred. Disappointed with the results, the trio planned to also attack the mayor of the village, who, according to them, was a leftist who always gave the jobs to Roma people. Later on, an allegation by a Magyar Gárda employee claimed that one of the men likely attended Mária Balogh's funeral, as a suspicious man with a tattoo on his right upper arm, most likely Árpád Kiss, was seen there.

==== Later plans ====
The perpetrators planned to acquire new weapons before they were captured, so they re-browsed gun advertisements on the internet and also began mapping the sellers' residences. They also considered acquiring high-powered automatic weapons from the military barracks in Hajdúhadház, with Csontos even taking photos of the area, but this idea was later abandoned.

After Kisléta, the gang planned to attack Ipolytarnóc on August 23, but this was thwarted by their arrest on August 21. This planned attack was confirmed after the seizure of satellite and other recordings, indicating they were going to attack a Roma-populated house in the town. During these seizures, police also uncovered evidence that they had planned to strike in Erdőkertes, Kisvárda and Tura.

=== General characteristics of the attacks ===
The initial attacks were mainly on buildings inhabited by Roma people, with the aim of causing fear and confusion. In comparison, the 2008 Nagycsécs attack marked a turning point in the case when press coverage gave confirmation to the perpetrators. In the subsequent attacks, they typically turned against the Roma with a more ordinary way of life, with the aim of heightening tensions between the Roma and the non-Roma. For this reason, the gang accepted István Csontos as a driver due to increased police presence on the streets.

In total, the gang attacked 10 villages, killed six people, and injured 55.

=== Investigation ===
During the investigation, police inspected one and a half million cars and millions of phone calls, as well as reviewing 800 hours worth of surveillance camera footage, lasting roughly a year since the start of the crimes. After the fifth attack in Alsószolca in December 2008, the police concluded that the same perpetrators were responsible for the recent spat of crimes, at which point they started focusing on how and by whom the attacks were committed, as well as who the targets were.

Concerning the Tarnabod attack, three young local Roma youths were charged after they had given false testimony and traces of gunpowder was found on them. However, according to their lawyer, the gunpowder actually originated from the arresting officers, and the boys had never owned a firearm. Six months later, the boys were released and later received monetary compensation for their unjustified detention.

A large part in stopping the actual killers were the cell phone calls made at the time and place of the crimes, as well as matching DNA samples taken from the suspects. Prior to their arrest, Hungarian police sought assistance from the FBI in profiling the perpetrators.

=== Irregularities in the investigation ===
The course of the investigation, especially on-site measures after the attack in Tatárszentgyörgy and the inspection of the storage site, was criticized in several aspects. According to several law enforcement agencies, the first-instance proceedings lasted 28 months because deficiencies in the locations had to be clarified during criminal proceedings.

On May 7, 2009, a forensics team funded by the National and Ethnic Minority Rights Protection Office, the Hungarian Civil Liberties Union and the European Roma Rights Centre was dispatched to Tatárszentgyörgy to collect data, which they would later published in their report titled The White Booklet. According to the report, after the tragedy, the first people to arrive on the scene were reporters from Dabasi Television, then police and firefighters, with the ambulance coming in last. The fire department falsely determined that a short circuit was the cause of the fire, despite a gas can being found on the spot, and police initially ignored testimony about gunshots sounding through the area. It was also documented that one of the detectives had urinated on a footprint possibly belonging to one of the killers, and some authorities claimed the cartridges had been scattered by the victims themselves.

The Independent Police Complaints Board found that the police had seriously violated the fundamental constitutional rights during the scene: while they had fulfilled their obligation to take action and help prevent an escalation of tensions, they had only partially secured the site. The fire was treated as accidental for more than 10 hours, and after the resignation group and the inspection committee withdrew, no police force remained at the crime scene until a morning inspection began. According to the Board, the reasons for this unprofessional conduct was a lack of ballistic knowledge. During the criminal lawsuit, the judge called the scene "shocking and desperate" because, for example, the ambulance paramedic had not noticed that one of the victims had been shot in the head.

Following the Tatárszentgyörgy tragedy, Prime Minister Ferenc Gyurcsány requested a report from the ministries to supervise the police, fire brigade and the hospitals, which later found an abundance of procedural and professional errors had occurred at the crime scene. The Chief Captain of Pest County initiated disciplinary proceedings against the hot-pressed commander and the head of the on-site inspection.

According to diplomatic cables leaked in 2011, the staff of the American embassy in Budapest commented that the view of Hungarian police was that most of the population were indifferent about the case. A few days after the gang members were arrested, in the last days of August 2009, a document referring to intelligence sources appeared on the Internet detailing the omissions made by the intelligence services. The documents revealed that all three main members had been monitored before the attacks, but their supervision had ceased after they had begun. Since 2004, István Kiss had not only been under close control by the Hajdú-Bihar police department, but at the beginning of 2008, he was noted for preparing to purchase weapons and large quantities of ammunition. The county branch initiated an extension into its secret data collection program, and even informed then-director general Sándor Laborc about it, but the request was rejected by higher-ups. The National Security Committee of the National Assembly found that there was insufficient communication between units from the Office of Natural Security and that the service was uncaring in its handling of extremists under surveillance. In the spring of 2008, despite the request of the Hajdú-Bihar operations officer, the Legal Department never issued a surveillance order on Árpád Kiss or Zsolt Pető, nor did it tighten surveillance on István Kiss, which later on was completely suspended. The committee also established that György Szilvásy and Ádám Ficsor, the successor socialist ministers in charge of the national security services, as well as the former director-general of NBH Sándor Laborc and the acting director-general László Balajti were responsible for this misconduct, with all four resigning from their respective posts. The report also indicted Attorney General Tamás Kovács, but no charges were brought against him. Four former NBH officers were charged with forgery of public documents, and even Csontos' detention officer was prosecuted for providing false testimony because he had denied at the hearing that he had anything to do with the detainee, but all defendants were acquitted of their respective charges.

In connection with the previous surveillance of the perpetrators by the intelligence agencies, Minister of Defense Csaba Hende initiated an investigation into the activities of the KBH during the murders; the results were originally scheduled to remain encrypted until 2020, but were made public on September 4, 2013.

=== Arrest ===
The breakthrough in the case was when the gang's car got stuck in the mud after the attack in Tiszalök, when Árpád Kiss called his girlfriend Évá N. to help take them home. When the phone call was inspected, it was discovered that this same cellular device had been used in proximity to the Galgagyörk and Kisléta crime scenes. A week later, all four suspects were being monitored, and after surveillance determined that the group was planning another attack, it was determined that their arrest could not be postponed any longer.

The National Bureau of Investigation and the REBISZ arrested two of the men at the dawn of August 21, 2009, at the Pérenyi Club in Debrecen. The arresting force consisted of 85 officers and hundreds of detectives conducting house searches in 13 locations parallel to the arrests, during which they detained the other two suspects. While examining the detainees' homes and dozens of other locations, 1,916 items were seized: map sketches, the getaway vehicle and the winter tires, boots, cameras, and the weapons, which were found hidden in the Pérenyi Club. Police determined that the attacks had been timed, as the perpetrators had wanted to avoid any civilian injuries. In addition, the stolen weaponry from Besenyszög was also found and confiscated from the Kiss brothers' apartment. As the perpetrators lacked any official permit to handle the weaponry, they were also charged with misuse of firearms and ammunition.

=== Trial ===
The four men were charged with six murders, five attempted murders, reckless endangerment, maiming, armed robbery, theft and misuse of weaponry and ammunition. In addition, it was specifically mentioned that their actions were committed for racist motives. The first trial began on March 25, 2011, at the Budapest District Court. The final verdict was delivered on August 6, 2013, when all four defendants were found guilty on all counts. Árpád Kiss, István Kiss and Zsolt Pető received life terms with 10 years deprivation of civil rights, while István Csontos received a 13-year prison term and 10 years deprivation of civil rights. The four were also required to reimburse the victims' families for 107 million forints. A second trial took hold at the Curia (the forum building for the Supreme Court) in 2016, where the sentences of the convicts were upheld.

=== Open questions ===
Although the manner in which the weapons were stolen was clarified to the smallest detail, the origins of the ammunition were not revealed. On the basis of the indictment, it turned out that there were several acquisitions of weapons and ammunition for which there were no intermediaries or contributors. In addition, they did not operate in isolation from other extremist groups and individuals in Debrecen and elsewhere, although Árpád Kiss gradually distanced himself from them and gradually began to use his phone less and less. It is also known that the accomplice in the initial robbery of the weapons has never been identified.

During the raid in Perényi Club, in addition to the four later defendants, the police also arrested two other persons, Antal R. and László E., on suspicion of aiding and abetting suspected criminals. They were investigated for possible connection to the gang, but in the end, both were released without any charges. This is despite the fact that one of the men, Antal R., was a self-avowed neo-Nazi and had previously served time in the same jail as István Csontos, with his profile matching that of the suspect accomplice in the robbery.

Following the arrests of the accused, an unofficial document leaked which stated that István Kiss had been monitored by the Constitution Protection Office until May 2008. It is unknown how the agency was made aware of the Besenszyög robbery during this period, and as no members of it were questioned during the trial as witnesses nor the indictment mentioned the organization's relationship with the accused, it remains a mystery.

It is also unclear how the perpetrators acquired the necessary finances for the attacks, or whether they had any supporters, helpers or instigators. According to the investigators, Árpád Kiss and his brother, István, and István Csontos each had an income of around 100-120 thousand forints per month, with only Zsolt Pető earning 200 thousand from his two jobs. Thus, it was rightly concluded that, while they could have had enough for the spent ammunition and raw materials used for the Molotov cocktails, it was considered doubtful it would have covered any other expenses associated with the attacks. The members never used their own phones, always using either disposable phones with SIM cards or walkie-talkies. According to the indictment, the ammo used by Pető alone was enough to dry up their income, and this was excluding travel costs for vignettes and fuel.

== Cause of events ==
=== Perpetrators' background ===
At the time of the attacks, Árpád Kiss was 42, his brother István - 33, Zsolt Pető - 34 and István Csontos, who took part solely in the Tiszalök attack, only 27. The latter two were friends of the brothers.

- While Árpád Kiss had no known close relationships with members of neo-Nazi circles in Debrecen, the idea of racially motivated attacks originated from him. After taking his matura, he played the drums in a rock band named Replica, but later left. The band strongly distanced themselves from him in the aftermath of his arrest. Árpád later worked in Israel for some time, before returning home to Hungary. His radicalism was accentuated by the fact that he openly espoused his hatred for Roma people in front of his friends, and that he had committed one of the attacks by himself.
- His younger brother, István, had previously worked as a chef. According to the indictment, a gradual impression formed in him that when grouped together, Roma gangs only bred trouble and violence. Before he had reached the age of 14, a group of Roma youths had beaten him and stolen his tape recorder, and from the on, he began to associate with the local Debrecen skinheads, the Véres Kard, adopting to their clothing fashion and tattooing himself. From the middle until the end of the 90s, he frequented the Loki Klub pub, the seat of the leather-headed, hard-core Debrecen football team fan club, where he met one of his future accomplices, Zsolt Pető, who sympathized with his xenophobic and exclusionary views. He had previously been charged with arson, which had initially prompted his surveillance by the Constitution Protection Office, but the case was later dropped in 1995 due to lack of evidence, and it was never made clear whether he was the culprit or not. In 1999, he got into a fight with a bouncer of mixed-Roma origin, causing him an injury that required his spleen to be surgically removed. In the early 2000s, István joined a band called "The Bloody Sword".
- Zsolt Pető worked as a confectioner and dog breeder. He had a neo-Nazi tattoo on the nape of his neck with the number 88, a symbol meaning "Heil Hitler", and had a previous conviction for rioting. He worked as an armed security guard at the Perényi Club, and as a result, he was registered to own a gun. Together with István Kiss, he was a member of the Véras Kard, which idolized Adolf Hitler and Ferenc Szálasi. His hobbies included dog breeding, guns and going to the gym with István Kiss.
- István Csontos, who joined the gang later on, worked in storage and had previously served as a mercenary in Kosovo. During his military career, he severed ties with his neo-Nazi company.

The investigation determined that none of the defendants suffered from mental illness or any personality disorders that necessitated a mitigation of their sentences.

=== Motives ===
The main motivations of the perpetrators, who described themselves as neo-Nazis and Hungarianists, was retaliation to crimes committed by Roma offenders who, in their view, terrorized the ethnic Hungarian population but always got away with lenient sentences. The Kiss brothers were particularly affected by an infamous case from 2006, when teacher Lajos Szögi was lynched by the relatives of a girl he had almost run over with his car, but then attempted to help. The murder caused outrage in the population, with the brothers joining the National Guard in sympathy, initially believing that the paramilitary organization was suitable for regulating the Roma, taking part in their protest in Pest in 2007. However, they came to the conclusion that the National Guard was not strict enough. All three of the main defendants agreed that the state authorities, the judiciaries and the police were doing an improper job in detecting and punishing Roma criminals, and because of this, they had decided to take justice into their own hands.

== Commemoration ==
In November 2009, the National Gypsy Minority Self-government placed a memorial plaque at the organization's headquarters on Dóhany Street in Budapest, but it was later removed.

On July 19, 2011, a monument designed by Zoltán Nagygyörgy and Ádám Márk Horváth, and funded by Csepel and ARC, was revealed at the Gödör Club in Budapest, to commemorate the victims of the murders and to emphasize the peaceful coexistence of ethnic Hungarians and Roma Hungarians. The monument was exhibited at the Valley of the Arts in Kapolcs, at the Vidor Festival in Nyíregyháza, and at the Sziget Festival and Millenáris Park in Budapest.

The murders inspired the plot of the 2012 film Just the Wind, directed by Benedek Fliegauf. Eszter Hajdú made a documentary about the case entitled Judgment in Hungary; it later won the 2014 jury grand prize at the Open City Docs in London.

After the first fatal attack had occurred, on November 3, 2018, the local Roma government inaugurated a memorial plaque in memory of the Nagy couple in Nagycsécs. On February 23, 2019, a civil commemoration in honor of the victims of the Tatárszentgyörgy attack was held in Budapest. Participants gathered at Pope John Paul II Square and then, after delivering their speeches, marched together toward the Deák Square Lutheran Church, where worship services were held.

On March 28, 2019, Gergely Karácsony, the mayor of Zugló, forwarded a motion to rename Mexikói Street to Robika Csorba Street. As the family wished to discuss this more widely, he withdrew the motion at their request on April 29.

In a debate held during the second round of the 2019 Budapest municipal elections, candidates Olga Kálmán, Gábor Kerpel-Fronius and Gergely Karácsony all stated that they would support the erection of a memorial to the murder victims in Budapest.

== Renewal and reopening of the investigation ==
At the end of 2018, Árpád Kiss asked for a retrial, basing his appeal off the incorrect information provided in the Tiszalök case, which would redefine his guilt from that of a main perpetrator to accomplice, thus reducing his sentence. This was rejected by the Metropolitan Judgement Board on March 28, 2019. In the retrial request, Árpád Kiss claimed that he had not handled a gun during the murder of Jenö Kóka, but that it was his brother, István, who had pulled the trigger and that his footprint had not been recorded by authorities; he also alleged that the shooting of the Debrecen refugee camp was not done by him but by Zsolt Petö, and that he had been at his workplace at the time. He raised his younger brother's confession as new evidence, however, according to the reasoning of the panel, the new evidence must be capable of establishing a new fact not present in the judgment, which in itself could make the accused likely to get an acquittal or lesser sanction. Since procedural positions cannot be accumulated and charged persons unable to be heard as witnesses, his motion was denied.

At the beginning of March 2020, the press reported for the first time that the main defendant, Árpád Kiss, wished for a new trial concerning the Roma murders. In his view, the role of the socialist government and the secret services had not been properly clarified in previous proceedings. Kiss complained that the reasons for the events (social tension between the ethnic Roma and Hungarians, as well as open coverage as crimes committed by Roma people) were all due to activities encouraged by the government at the time, and that the National Guard and the Sixty-Four Counties Youth Movement had moles who encouraged the acquisition of weapons and the extermination of Roma people, a fact confirmed by the latter organization. According to Kiss, the ethnic conflict was blown up by people with a background in the secret services in 2008 in Galgagyörk, as a result of which they had begun to "settle in", espousing slogans reminiscent of one used by the services. He also claimed that the first killing taking place in the same village was no coincidence, alleging that it was all planned in advance by the Constitution Protection Office, who had already admitted that they had monitored István Kiss, but had withheld his files. This general phenomenon, in his view, was caused by the Gyurcsány government's desire to divert people's attention from the country's poor economic situation, anti-government sentiment and impending election defeat for the Hungarian Socialist Party.

Árpád Kiss also requested an re-examination of István Csontos' role in the murders, as well as people related to him, citing his service in Kosovo and later employment by the Military Security Office and constant contact with his detaining officer, whom he had met in person before the last attack in Kisléta. To date, it has not been revealed exactly what the two men had conversed about nor whether Csontos' officer, Ernö Hódos, reported to his supervisor about the meeting. Kiss also requested that the investigators find out why Csontos had been let go from the scene and arrested hours later. István himself later claimed that the police interrogation had been a simple mistake.

In May 2020, the National Bureau of Investigation confirmed that it was conducting a new investigation into the alleged fifth member, and that it was seeking information for any potential instigators, financiers or other accomplices. The reopening of the investigation is presumably related to the new information provided by Árpád Kiss, albeit it remains unclear whether specific people have been eyed as potential suspects.

== See also ==
- List of serial killers by country
