= Nicolas Wright =

Canadian actor (born 1982)

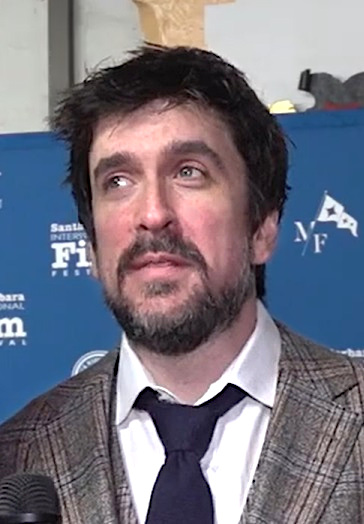
- Wright at SBIFF 2024
- Born: March 23, 1982 (age 43)
- Occupation: Actor
- Years active: 2003–present

Nicolas Wright (born March 23, 1982) is a Canadian actor. Wright has performed on stage, television and film. In 2004, he received the "most promising newcomer" award at the Just for Laughs film festival in Montreal for his short film, Toutouffe. His credits include Hatley High (2003), Superstorm (2007), The Wild Hunt (2008), Afghan Luke (2011), and Independence Day: Resurgence (2016). He was nominated for an ACTRA Montreal Award for outstanding male performance for his acting in the movie White House Down (2013).

== Career ==
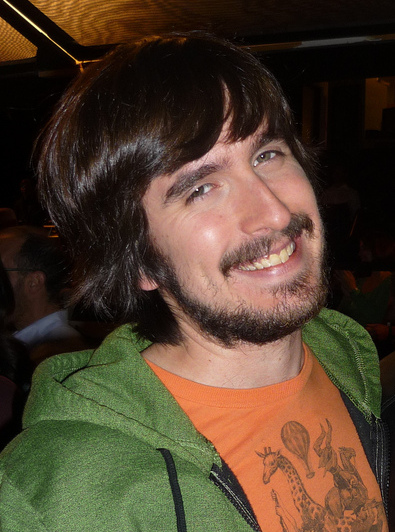
Wright in October 2009

Nicolas began his career on film playing the lead role in Hatley High (2003), He co-starred with Tom Sizemore and Nicola Stephenson in the BBC mini-series, Superstorm (2007). He starred in the IFC mini-series, The Festival (2005), and its spin-off sequel The Business, which co-starred Kathleen Robertson. In 2007, he starred in MGM’s War Games: The Dead Code, and Lifetime’s Girl's Best Friend, alongside Janeane Garofalo, as well as PHILMS Pictures’ Prom Wars, alongside Raviv Ullman and Alia Shawkat. The following year he starred in the Canadian independent feature The Wild Hunt, and in 2009 he appeared in the CBS prime time comedy Accidentally On Purpose, with Jenna Elfman, Ashley Jensen, Grant Show and Jon Foster. Later that year he starred alongside Nick Stahl in the Alliance Atlantis film, Afghan Luke. In 2012 he starred in Camera Shy,. In 2014 Manhattan Love Story.

Wright also writes and directs his own projects, like his first short film Toutouffe. A film he produced, wrote and starred in (Mike Clattenburg's short film Crackin' Down Hard), in 2012. Wright has appeared in the Columbia Pictures, Roland Emmerich-directed, feature film, White House Down (2013).

== Nominations and awards ==
He won special mention as "the most promising newcomer" at the 2004 Montreal Comedy Festival Just for Laughs for his short film Toutouffe. In 2015, he was nominated for an ACTRA Montreal Award for outstanding male performance for his acting in the movie White House Down (2013).
