= Keep a Modest Head =

- French: Ne crâne pas sois modeste
- Directed by: Deco Dawson
- Written by: Deco Dawson
- Produced by: Deco Dawson; Catherine Chagnon; Craig Trudeau
- Cinematography: Deco Dawson
- Edited by: Deco Dawson
- Music by: Paul Schrofel
- Production companies: Endstop and Elsewhere; Microclimat Films
- Release date: 2012
- Running time: 19 minutes
- Country: Canada
- Language: French

Keep a Modest Head (French: Ne crâne pas sois modeste) is a Canadian short documentary film, directed by Deco Dawson and released in 2012. The film is a tribute to Jean Benoît, a Canadian artist often credited as "the last surrealist".

The film premiered at the 2012 Toronto International Film Festival, where it won the Toronto International Film Festival Award for Best Canadian Short Film. TIFF subsequently named the film to its year-end Canada's Top Ten list of short films. The film was a shortlisted Canadian Screen Award finalist for Best Short Documentary Film at the 1st Canadian Screen Awards.
