= FILM(dzama) =

2001 film

- Directed by: Deco Dawson
- Written by: Deco Dawson
- Starring: Maurice Dzama
- Cinematography: Myles Langlois
- Edited by: Deco Dawson
- Release date: September 9, 2001 (TIFF)
- Running time: 23 minutes
- Country: Canada
- Language: English

FILM(dzama) is a Canadian short drama film, directed by Deco Dawson and released in 2001. The film is a fictionalized biography of artist Marcel Dzama, as played by Dzama's real-life father Maurice, shot on Super 8 film in a surrealist manner influenced by the films of Salvador Dalí, Luis Buñuel, Man Ray and Guy Maddin.

The film was the fifth and last in Dawson's FILM series of experimental short films, following FILM(luster), FILM(emend), FILM(knout) and FILM(lode).

The film premiered at the 2001 Toronto International Film Festival, where it won the award for Best Canadian Short Film.
