= Hatley High =

- Directed by: Phil Price
- Screenplay by: Myles Hainsworth
- Story by: Myles Hainsworth; Phil Price
- Produced by: Brandi-Ann Milbradt
- Starring: Nicolas Wright; Rachelle Lefevre; James A. Woods
- Cinematography: John Ashmore
- Edited by: David Eberts; Yvann Thibaudeau
- Music by: Oliver Sasse
- Distributed by: Seville Pictures
- Release date: September 2003
- Running time: 90 minutes
- Country: Canada
- Language: English
- Budget: $300,000 USD

Hatley High is a 2003 Canadian independent comedy film directed by Phil Price and written by Myles Hainsworth. It was shown at various film festivals from September 2003 to 2005 including the San Diego Film Festival and the U.S. Comedy Arts Festival.

== Plot ==
Tommy Linklater is an 18-year-old whose magic is often minor (re-directing croquet balls, making cards appear in closed purses, etc.) but is always genuine since he actually does the impossible. He soon learns that his hobby for playing chess while his mother was alive is another gift that she left him. His father, Herman Linklater, is a physicist who believes that all the universes mysteries will eventually be explained away.

Tommy's mother and Herman's wife, Melanie, has died and left them a house in a small lakeside town, North Hatley, that they did not know she owned. They decide to move there for a year so that Herman can finish his book on cosmology. Once they arrive, the Linklaters discover that Melanie was something of a local legend. She left North Hatley after throwing a game against the town's greatest chess rivals, the Russians. The town was forced to realize their mistakes by pushing her too hard to win and thus undermining the soul of the game. Her pictures and trophies are everywhere in the small town.

Tommy attends Hatley High, whose main claim to fame is the Knights, an internationally ranked chess team. He befriends a basketball prodigy, Julius, whose secret passion is surfing, as well as Trevor and Darryl, two charming and ambitious guys who call themselves the Syndicate. He also meets and ends up going out with Hyacinthe Marquez, the beautiful and witty cheerleader who does cartwheels as effortlessly as she quotes Oscar Wilde. Herman, meanwhile, is being pestered by the town priest, Lorne Granger, who is a physics buff who actually and casually talks to God. Herman is very uncomfortable around priests but is eventually won over by Lorne's enthusiasm for physics. Herman undergoes a sort of epiphany when Lorne provides him with an equation that is not supposed to exist. The equation enables him to finish his book, but he is forced to confront the possibility that he's not living in a clockwork universe after all.

Shaun Rodes, the egomaniac and captain of the chess team, keeps challenging Tommy to a chess match since he wishes to find out if Tommy inherited his mother's skills. Tommy refuses, but Hyacinthe sets up an after school game of chess between Shaun and Tommy. Tommy loses and chides Hyacinthe for selling him out. However, Shaun has a feeling that Tommy threw the game. Hyacinthe manages to win Tommy back by singing to him outside his window, and Tommy is moved to forgive her. Shaun, still suspicious from his victory, invites Tommy to an underground high-stakes chess club, which is rife with shady characters, hot babes, and money.

Shaun, hoping to prove his suspicions of Tommy's monumental talent, volunteers him to play a blitz game against the top player in the club. Tommy reluctantly shows up but wins easily. When it is announced that the Russian Junior Chess Team is coming to play Hatley High, the whole town is thrown into a frenzy for an opportunity for redemption. At the pregame dance, Anya, the captain of the Russian chess team, easily seduces Shaun, ties him up, and locks him in the school's attic, solidifying a Russian win. During halftime, Tommy performs a spectacular magic show. When Shaun does not escape from his bonds in time to play the remaining match, the coach is forced to substitute Tommy in his place.

== Awards ==
The film won two awards at the U.S. Comedy Arts Festival; "Best Director" for Phil Price, and "Best Screenplay" for Myles Hainsworth.
