= Crackin' Down Hard =

2012 film

- Directed by: Mike Clattenburg
- Written by: Mike Clattenburg; Nicolas Wright; Yoursie Thomas
- Produced by: Mike Clattenburg; Nicolas Wright
- Starring: Nicolas Wright; Yoursie Thomas
- Cinematography: Jonathan Hoeg
- Edited by: Mike Clattenburg; Nicolas Wright
- Release date: September 10, 2012 (TIFF)
- Running time: 10 minutes
- Country: Canada
- Language: English

Crackin' Down Hard is a Canadian short comedy film, directed by Mike Clattenburg and released in 2012. The films stars Nicolas Wright as a man trying to relax in isolation in California's Joshua Tree National Park, when another man (Yoursie Thomas) shows up to offer him a prostitute.

The film premiered at the 2012 Toronto International Film Festival, where it received an honorable mention from the Best Canadian Short Film award jury. In December 2012, the film was named to TIFF's annual year-end Canada's Top Ten list for short films.
