= Afghan Luke =

- Poster
- Directed by: Mike Clattenburg
- Written by: Patrick Graham; Douglas Bell; Mike Clattenburg; Barrie Dunn
- Produced by: Barrie Dunn; Michael Volpe; Mike Clattenburg
- Starring: Nick Stahl; Nicolas Wright; Stephen Lobo; Vik Sahay
- Cinematography: Jeremy Benning
- Edited by: Roger Matiussi
- Music by: Blain Morris
- Release date: 2011
- Running time: 97 minutes
- Country: Canada
- Language: English

Afghan Luke is a 2011 Canadian war drama film directed by Mike Clattenburg. The central character, Luke Benning (Nick Stahl), is a journalist investigating the possible mutilation (by Canadian snipers) of corpses in Afghanistan, a country that appears increasingly incomprehensible and surreal as Luke undergoes a series of bizarre adventures. The film was nominated for a Writers Guild of Canada 2012 Screenwriting Award and has appeared at the Shanghai International Film Festival, the Toronto International Film Festival, Cinéfest, and the Atlantic Film Festival.

== Cast ==
- Nick Stahl as Luke
- Nicolas Wright as Tom
- Stephen Lobo as Mateen
- Vik Sahay as Imran Sahar
- Pascale Hutton as Elita
- Steve Cochrane as Sergeant Rick Cahoon
- Torrance Coombs as Private Davey
- Ali Liebert as Miss Freedom
- Colin Cunningham as Lieutenant Christer
- Parm Soor as Ustad Mir
- Ron Lea as Mark
- Lewis Black as Lewis Black

== Reception ==
Reviewer Adam Donaldson wrote: "I’ve said it before and I’ll say it again, Afghan Luke is possibly the best war satire since either Robert Altman’s M*A*S*H, or Three Kings by David O. Russell. It’s also interesting that in the year that Canada starts winding down its military commitment in Afghanistan, and as people now more than ever question the reasons why we’re still there, I think Afghan Luke gave us the most concise and accurate explanation of the history and politics of that country: nobody gets it. But politics aside, this was a bold departure for Mike Clattenburg, who's still perhaps best known as one of the driving forces behind The Trailer Park Boys, and it will be very interesting to see what he’ll do on the big screen next."
