= Kapolcs =

- Flag Coat of arms

- Location of Veszprém county in Hungary

- Location of Kapolcs
- Coordinates: 46.95463°N 17.60696°E
- Country: Hungary
- County: Veszprém

Area
  - Total: 13.97 km^{2} (5.39 sq mi)

Population (2004)
  - Total: 442
  - Density: 31.63/km^{2} (81.9/sq mi)
- Time zone: UTC+1 (CET)
  - Summer (DST): UTC+2 (CEST)
- Postal code: 8294
- Area code: 87

Kapolcs is a village in Veszprém county, Hungary.

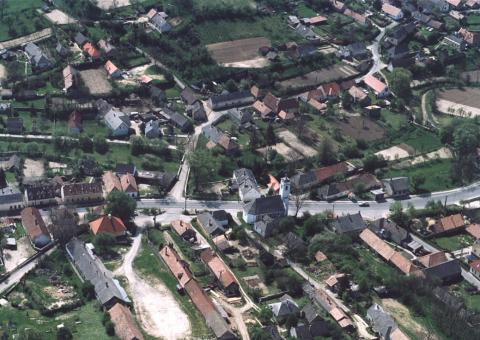
Aerial photograph of Kapolcs

== Location ==
The villages lies in Káli-medence landscape area, in the valley of Eger-patak ( the citizens of Kapolcs call it "Séd").

=== Neighbouring villages ===
- Vigántpetend, Monostorapáti and Taliándörögd
