= James A. Woods =

Canadian actor (born 1979)

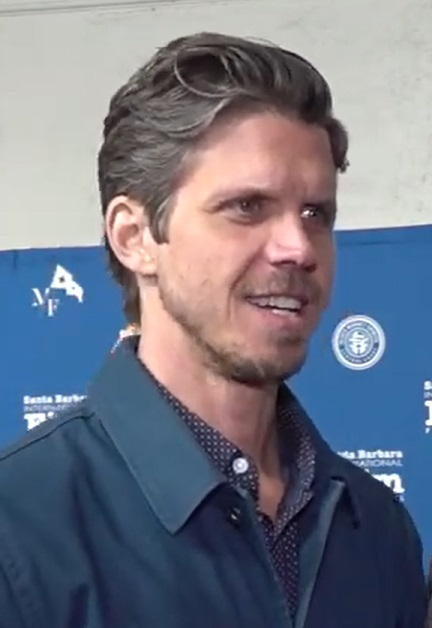
- Woods at SBIFF 2024
- Born: 18 December 1979 (age 46); Montreal, Quebec, Canada
- Occupation: Actor
- Years active: 2001–2016

James Andre Woods (born 18 December 1979) is a Canadian actor who has performed in films, television and video games.

== Early life and education ==
Woods was born in Montreal, Quebec, and trained at New York City's Lee Strasberg Theatre and Film Institute before returning to his native Montreal to pursue an acting career.

== Career ==
Woods starred in Hatley High, distributed in Canada by Seville Films and winner of Best Director and Best Screenplay awards at The Comedy Festival. Additional film credits include the TVA Films theatrical release Eternal and the Ed Solomon directed Levity. He also starred in The Watch (2008).

Woods' television credits include Seriously Weird (YTV/ITV), Big Wolf on Campus (Fox Family), Undressed (MTV), Fries with That? (Télé-Action), Naked Josh (Showcase/Oxygen) and Galidor: Defenders of the Outer Dimension (Fox Kids).

In 2011, he worked alongside Jake Gyllenhaal in the film Source Code, and in 2015, he appeared as Jason in Gridlocked; In 2016, he played Lt. Ritter alongside Bill Pullman in Independence Day: Resurgence.

Woods has worked with Ubisoft on their award-winning games, particularly Tom Clancy's Splinter Cell: Conviction, as the antagonistic Thomas Reed, and twice in the Far Cry franchise, starting in Far Cry 3 as Keith Ramsay, and as the protagonist Ajay Ghale in Far Cry 4. Woods later performed as antagonist Viktor Marchenko in 2016's Deus Ex: Mankind Divided.

== Filmography ==
=== Film ===
Year	Title	Role	Notes
2003	Levity	Young Roundabout	
2003	Lost Junction	Another Boy	
2003	Hatley High	Shaun Rhodes	
2004	Eternal	Tom	
2007	Jack Brooks: Monster Slayer	John	
2011	Source Code	Aviator Glasses Guy	
2011	Immortals	Captain of the Archers	Uncredited
2013	The Smurfs 2	Peanut Father	
2013	The Right Kind of Wrong	Troy Cooper	
2013	Three Night Stand	Co-worker 1	
2015	Gridlocked	Jason	
2016	Independence Day: Resurgence	Lt. Ritter	Also co-writer

=== Television ===
Year	Title	Role	Notes
2001–2002	Big Wolf on Campus	Chuck Freeman	3 episodes
2002	Undressed	Jack	Episode: "Busted"
2002	Seriously Weird	Bear	Episode: "When Gods Get Angry"
2004–2006	Naked Josh	Steve	16 episodes
2005	The Festival	Lance Rawly	6 episodes
2006–2007	The Business	Lance Rawly	11 episodes
2007	The House Sitter	Randy	Television film
2007	The Dead Zone	Tommy Rasmussen	Episode: "Drift"
2008	Voices	Brendan Daly	Television film
2008	The Watch	Rhett	Television film
2009	Being Erica	Trevor Markowitz	Episode: "Dr. Tom"
2009	Hellhounds	Theron	Television film
2009	Lance Et Compte: Le Grand Duel	Guillaume Pratte	7 episodes
2011	Blue Mountain State	Kyle	Episode: "Trap Game"
2011	Jack of Diamonds	Brandt Beck	Television film
2011	Exposed	Justin Reynolds	Television film
2011–2012	Totally Amp'd	Archie	10 episodes
2014	Being Human	Mark	5 episodes

=== Video games ===
Year	Title	Role
2010	Tom Clancy's Splinter Cell: Conviction	Tom Reed
2010	Prince of Persia: The Forgotten Sands	Malik's Royal Guardsman
2010	Tom Clancy's H.A.W.X 2	Voice
2011	Deus Ex: Human Revolution	Additional voices
2012	Assassin's Creed III	Additional voices
2012	Far Cry 3	Keith Ramsay
2013	Assassin's Creed III: The Tyranny of King Washington	Additional voices
2013	Far Cry 3: Blood Dragon	Additional voices
2013	Deus Ex: Human Revolution	Additional voices
2014	Watch Dogs	Chicago Male Civilian
2014	Far Cry 4	Ajay Ghale
2016	Deus Ex: Mankind Divided	Viktor Marchenko
