= Brian Stockton =

Canadian filmmaker

- Born: 1964 (age 61–62); Regina, Saskatchewan, Canada
- Education: University of Regina (BFA); York University (MFA)
- Occupations: Filmmaker, screenwriter, educator

Brian Stockton is a Canadian filmmaker, screenwriter, and educator from Regina, Saskatchewan. Known for autobiographical documentaries and satirical comedies that combine deadpan humor, personal narrative and formal experimentation. He is best known for Wheat Soup (1987) and The Sabbatical.

== Early life and education ==
Stockton was raised in Regina, Saskatchewan. He received a BFA in Film from the University of Regina and an MFA from York University. He served as Director Resident of the Canadian Film Centre in the 1990s and worked in Canada's independent film scene.

In the 2000s, Stockton returned to Saskatchewan from Toronto to teach filmmaking at the University of Regina.

== Career ==
Stockton’s work combines experimental shorts, comedic features, and serialized autobiographical short films. He began making short experimental films in the mid‑1980s and released his first feature, Wheat Soup, in 1987. Produced by the Saskatchewan Filmpool Cooperative on a reported budget of approximately $14,000, Wheat Soup has been cited as an early dramatic feature produced in Saskatchewan and has been described as a pseudo‑experimental, dream‑like examination of prairie life.

Following several short and animated works, Stockton continued to work across formats throughout the 1990s and 2000s. His animated short Self: (Portrait/Fulfillment) — A Film by the Blob Thing screened in the Perspective Canada program at the Toronto International Film Festival in 2001.

In 2015, Stockton released the feature-length narrative, The Sabbatical, a midlife-crisis comedy that premiered at the Whistler Film Festival and had a market screening at the Cannes Film Festival. It received critical praise for its dry wit and relatable depiction of creative burnout.

In 2018, Stockton compiled and released The Epic Story of My Life in Ten Short Films, an autobiographical film series chronicling his life in Regina and featuring nostalgic Candiana elements. The project combines family home movies and photographs spanning several decades and reflects on regional identity and media culture. Films from the series have screened at festivals around the world.

== Filmography ==
=== Feature Films ===
- Wheat Soup (1987)
- The 24 Store (1990)
- I Heart Regina (2010)
- The Sabbatical (2015)

=== Short Films (selected) ===
- Agoraphobia (1985)
- The Floating of Mike (1986)
- All Form, No Substance (1987)
- Personal Possessions (1988)
- The Blob Thing (1988)
- The Final Gift (1990)
- Revenge of the Blob Thing (1993)
- The Weight of the World (1994)
- TV Stories (1996)
- Self: [Portrait/Fulfillment] - A Film by the Blog Thing (2001)
- My Dinner with Generation X (2010)
- The Epic Story of My Life in Ten Short Films (series, 1990s–present)
- 2081 (2017)
- I Forgive You (2018)
