= Deco Dawson =

Canadian experimental filmmaker

Deco Dawson is the professional name of Darryl Kinaschuk, a Ukrainian Canadian experimental filmmaker. He is most noted as a two-time winner of the Toronto International Film Festival Award for Best Canadian Short Film, winning at the 2001 Toronto International Film Festival for FILM(dzama) and at the 2012 Toronto International Film Festival for Keep a Modest Head, and was a shortlisted Canadian Screen Award nominee for Best Short Documentary for the latter film at the 1st Canadian Screen Awards in 2013.

In his early career, he was also a regular collaborator with Guy Maddin, with whom he was credited as editor on The Heart of the World and Dracula: Pages from a Virgin's Diary, serving as associate-co-director on the latter. In addition, Dawson acted as the co-cinematographer on Maddin's The Heart of the World, Dracula: Pages from a Virgin's Diary and Fancy, Fancy Being Rich and both the editor and co-cinematographer on the Sparklehorse music video for "It's a Wonderful Life".

Dawson first started working in the theatre at the age of 17 where a few years later Guy Maddin attended one of his plays entitled A Silent Act, a 65-minute silent, physical comedy play created in the style of the Marx Brothers, Buster Keaton and Charlie Chaplin. In 2016, Dawson provided projected video elements for the Royal Manitoba Theatre Centre's production of Chimerica. In addition to his own film projects, Dawson continues to work semi-regularly in the theatre as a video projection designer.

His debut feature film Diaspora premiered on October 8, 2022 in Montreal at the 2022 Festival du nouveau cinéma.
