= Khaled (film) =

2001 film by Asghar Massombagi

- Directed by: Asghar Massombagi
- Written by: Asghar Massombagi
- Produced by: Paul Scherzer
- Starring: Michael D'Ascenzo; Michelle Duquet; John Ralston; Joanne Boland
- Cinematography: Luc Montpellier
- Edited by: Christopher Donaldson
- Music by: Mel Mrabet
- Production companies: Mongrel Media; Canadian Film Centre
- Distributed by: Mongrel Media
- Release date: September 10, 2001 (TIFF)
- Running time: 85 minutes
- Country: Canada
- Languages: English; French

Khaled is a 2001 Canadian drama film, directed and written by Asghar Massombagi following the titular character Khaled, a ten-year-old boy who tries to conceal the death of his mother. The film is noted for garnering honorable mentions and film festival awards.

== Plot ==
Khaled (Michael D'Ascenzo) lives in a Toronto housing project with his mother, who is French Canadian and chronically ill. His father is Moroccan and abandoned the family when Khaled was young. One day his mother dies, but Khaled attempts to carry on life as normal. His life deteriorates as his landlord harasses him for overdue rent, and neighbors begin to notice the smell of decay from his apartment.

== Release ==
The film premiered at the 2001 Toronto International Film Festival.

== Awards ==
At TIFF the film received an honorable mention for the FIPRESCI International Critics Award, and it was later named to TIFF's annual year-end Canada's Top Ten list for 2001.

At the 23rd Genie Awards in 2003, Mel M'Rabet received a nomination for Best Original Song, for "Ab (Father)".

Massombagi won the Best Director Award for the film at the 37th Karlovy Vary International Film Festival, and the First Time Filmmaker Award at the ReelWorld Film Festival.

== Legacy ==
In 2023, Telefilm Canada announced that the film was one of 23 titles that will be digitally restored under its new Canadian Cinema Reignited program to preserve classic Canadian films.
