= Asghar Massombagi =

Asghar Massombagi is an Iranian-Canadian film director, most noted for his 2001 film Khaled.

Born and raised in Tehran, he moved to Canada at age 18, and studied film at Simon Fraser University and the Canadian Film Centre. He made the short films Feel Like Chicken Tonight (1998) and The Miracle (1999) prior to the premiere of Khaled at the 2001 Toronto International Film Festival. Khaled won the Best Director Award for at the 37th Karlovy Vary International Film Festival, the First Time Filmmaker Award at the ReelWorld Film Festival, received an honorable mention for the FIPRESCI International Critics Award, and was named to TIFF's annual year-end Canada's Top Ten list for 2001.

In 2005 he released the short film Rose, and an episode of the television series Robson Arms.

In 2020 he was a participant in Greetings from Isolation, a project featuring short films by 45 Canadian directors about the COVID-19 pandemic in Canada.
