= Rose Lowder =

French-Peruvian avant-garde filmmaker (born 1941)

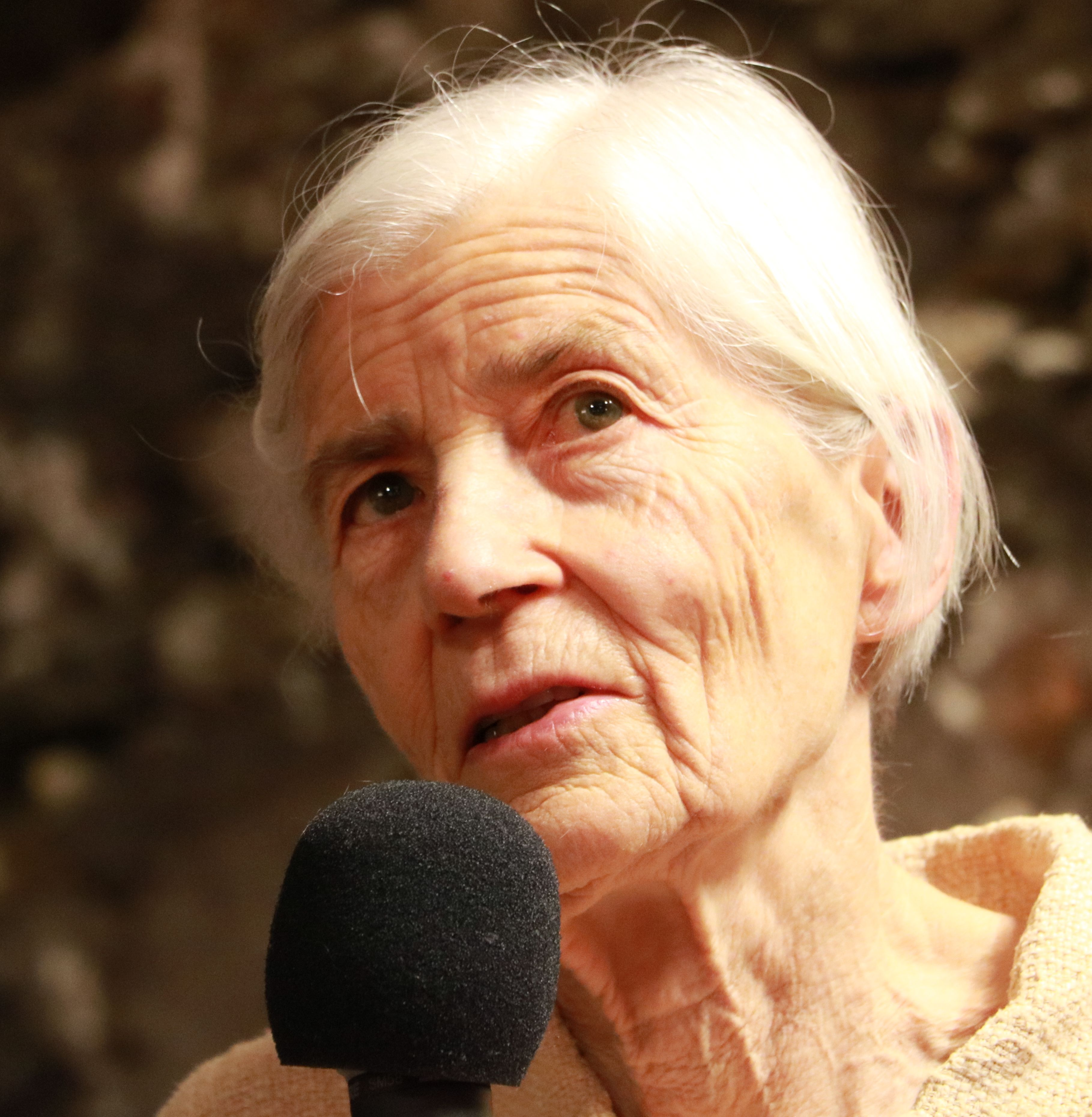
- Rose Lowder in October 2023
- Born: 1941 (age 84–85); Lima, Peru

Rose Lowder (born 1941) is a French-Peruvian avant-garde filmmaker.

== Early life ==
Lowder was born in the Miraflores District of Lima, Peru. She attended the San Silvestre School.. Her father was a British businessman, Kenneth Lowder, who became a pioneer in the advertising industry in Perú.

Lowder studied painting and sculpture in Lima at The Art Center and the School of Fine Arts. She moved to the United States for a brief period and then to London. There, Lowder studied at the Regent Street Polytechnic, which closed before she had finished her studies, and then at the Chelsea School of Art.

== Career ==
While working as an artist, Lowder made a living as a film editor in London. She edited documentaries, feature films, and advertisements. Lowder worked as an assistant editor at the BBC from 1965 to 1967. She and her partner Alain-Alcide Sudre moved to France, eventually ending up in Paris. They began to organize regular screenings of avant-garde films. In 1982, she and Sudre established the Archives du film expérimental d'Avignon.

== Exhibitions ==
In 2026, she exhibited Los Bouquets at Casa Gibson (Universidad Católica Santa María) in Arequipa, organized by proyectoamil, Alta Tecnología Andina and Corrientes, during the Hay Festival.

== Filmography ==
- Roulement, rouerie, aubage (1978)
- Certaines observations (1979)
- Couleurs mécaniques (1979)
- Champ provençal (1979)
- Parcelle (1979)
- Retour d'un repère (1979)
- Rue des Teinturiers (1979)
- Les tournesols (1982)
- Les tournesols colorés (1983)
- Scènes de la vie française: Arles (1985)
- Scènes de la vie française: Avignon (1986)
- Scènes de la vie française: La Ciotat (1986)
- Scènes de la vie française: Paris (1986)
- Impromptu (1989)
- Quidproquo (1992)
- Bouquets 1–10 (1995)
- Les coquelicots (2000)
- Voiliers et coquelicots (2002)
- L'invitation au voyage with Carl Brown (2003)
- Bouquets 21–30 (2005)
- Habitat (2006)
- Cote jardin (2007)
- Bouquets 11–20 (2010)
- Jardins du marais (2010)
- Jardin du soleil (2010)
- Rien d'extraordinaire (2010)
- Beijing 1988 (2011)
- Jardins du sel (2011)
- Sous le soleil (2011)
- Sources (2012)
- foryannfromrose (2014)
- Turbulence (2015)
- Tartarughe d'Acqua (2016)
