= Mouka =

Village in Haute-Kotto, Central African Republic

- Location in Central African Republic
- Coordinates: 7°17′21″N 21°53′10″E
- Country: Central African Republic
- Prefecture: Haute-Kotto
- Sub-prefecture: Bria
- Commune: Samba-Boungou

Mouka is a village situated in Haute-Kotto Prefecture, Central African Republic.

== History ==
UFDR captured Mouka on 30 October 2006. FACA recaptured the village on 29 November 2006. A clash between UFDR and CPJP occurred in Mouka on 25 June 2011 and casualties were reported on both side.

LRA attacked Mouka on 13 June 2013, and they met heavy resistance from the villagers. Casualties were reported on both sides, in which 16 people were killed while LRA lost its four fighters. LRA also burned 15 houses. As a result, the villagers fled Mouka.

Wagner forces visited Mouka on 9 February 2022 and opened fire towards people as they arrived. Twenty-five people were killed. The villagers panicked, and they fled to the forest. House burnings and looting committed by Wagner were happened.

FACA and MINUSCA forces captured Mouka from an armed group in the last week of May 2024.

== Education ==
There is a school in the village.

== Healthcare ==
The village does not have any health center.
