= Just the Wind =

2012 film

- Film poster
- Hungarian: Csak a szél
- Directed by: Benedek Fliegauf
- Starring: Lajos Sárkány; Katalin Toldi; Gyöngyi Lendvai; György Toldi
- Release dates: 16 February 2012 (Berlin); 5 April 2012 (Hungary)
- Country: Hungary
- Language: Hungarian

Just the Wind (Hungarian: Csak a szél) is a 2012 Hungarian drama film directed by Benedek Fliegauf. The film won the Jury Grand Prix at the 62nd Berlin International Film Festival. The film was selected as the Hungarian entry for the Best Foreign Language Oscar at the 85th Academy Awards, but it did not make the final shortlist.

It is based on an actual series of killings in Hungary. The plot however is fictional and focuses on a Roma family living close by. The film stars an amateur cast of Roma actors.

== Plot ==
Mari, a Romani Hungarian mother who has long endured hardship, lives with her elderly, incapacitated father and two children. They face financial struggles and harbor aspirations of one day immigrating to Canada. Their daily existence unfolds against the backdrop of a rural Hungarian neighborhood marked by a pervasive sense of unease due to a string of murders.

== Cast ==
- Lajos Sárkány as Rio
- Katalin Toldi as Mari
- Gyöngyi Lendvai as Anna
- György Toldi

== Production ==
Filmmaker Bence Fliegauf stated that he was driven to create a movie following a series of attacks on the Roma community between 2008 and 2009, involving weapons such as Molotov cocktails, shotguns, and rifles. "I was shocked by the events, I remember waking up in my sleep with nightmares, I saw shotgun flashes," Fliegauf told Reuters. He disclosed that he had Roma friends and a Roma girlfriend during his teenage years but had lost touch with the community. It was during his year-long research for the film that he realized the extent of the challenges faced by the Roma community since the fall of communism around two decades ago.

== See also ==
- List of submissions to the 85th Academy Awards for Best Foreign Language Film
- List of Hungarian submissions for the Academy Award for Best Foreign Language Film
