= Saskatchewan Filmpool Cooperative =

- Type: Non-profit
- Industry: Film & Filmmaking
- Founded: 1977; 49 years ago
- Headquarters: Regina, Saskatchewan, Canada
- Area served: Saskatchewan
- Key people: Sherry McCormick (Interim Executive Director); Ron Jacobs (Production Coordinator); Amber Hanover (Membership & Communications Coordinator)
- Members: 212
- Number of employees: 3
- Website: filmpool.ca

The Saskatchewan Filmpool Cooperative is a non-profit artist-run organization that supports and assists independent filmmaking in the province of Saskatchewan.

== History ==
Founded in 1977.

== Description ==
The Filmpool provides its members with film and sound editing facilities, film and video production equipment, and opportunities for production, post-production and distribution funding.

The organization hosts a number of events, workshops and screenings each year, and also publishes the indie filmmaking magazine Splice.

The Filmpool membership’s objectives are met by a volunteer board of directors in co-operation with paid staff.
