= Leighton Pierce =

American filmmaker

Leighton Pierce born John Leighton Pierce (27 October 1954, Rochester, NY) is an American experimental filmmaker who works with film, video, sound, and installation. He is best known for his impressionistic technique in video imagery that creates a hypnotic effect as well as his use of sound design. The motif of water is dominant in his work and gave the name to the video series "Memories of Water".

Pierce looks for inspiration in his immediate surroundings. He has stated that "in the simplest terms, a film or a video can be considered to be a meaningful experience in time. As a filmmaker, I take that as my mission: through the use of image and sound, I am composing an experience for the audience"

He has won over 60 awards from film and experimental festivals, grants such as the Rockefeller, Guggenheim, Creative Capital Award, and the National Endowment for the Arts, and has screened his films at the Museum of Modern Art, NY, the Sundance Film Festival, Rotterdam Film Festival, Cinémathèque française, and the Whitney Biennal.

== Exhibitions ==
In 1995, Leighton Pierce's first feature film "50 Feet of String" constructed a domestic space beyond the recognizable and mundanely familiar. The film won Best of Fest at the Ann Arbor Film Festival (1996), Best Experimental at the Atlanta Film and Video Festival (1996); Best Experimental at the Athens Film Festival (1996); Juror's Citation at Black Maria Film and Video Festival in 1996. It also screened at the Oberhausen Short Film Festival, the Osnabrück Media Arts Festival, the Image Forum, Japan, Impakt Film Festival, Robert Flaherty Film Seminar and Museum of Modern Art, NY.

In 2009, Leighton exhibited "Agency of Time" at the Sundance Film Festival : a multichannel video and sound installation that created animations from long-exposure photography. The installation was commissioned by the Sheldon Museum of Art. It creates an environment that play with the idea of time, memory and desire.

== Filmography ==
- He Likes to Chop Down Trees (1980)
- You Can Drive the Big Rigs (1981)
- The Miracle of Change (1984)
- Deer Isle, The Crossing (1991)
- Thursday (1991)
- Red Shovel (1992)
- 50 Feet of String (1995)
- Puppy-Go-Round (1996)
- Memories of Water #21 (1997)
- Glass (1998)
- Folded Time, Take 17 (2000)
- Wood (2000)
- The Back Steps (2001)
- Veiled Red! (2001)
- Fall (3 parts) (2002)
- Evaporation (2002)
- 37th & Lex (2002)
- Pink Socks (2002)
- Water Seeking Its Level (2002)
- A private happiness (2003)
- Viscera (2004)
- My Person in the Water (2006)
- Warm Occlusion (2006)
- Number One (2007)
- Agency of Time (2008-2009)
- Stone Moss (2009)
- Sitting (2010)
- Retrograde Premonition (2010)
- Sharp Edge Blunt (2010)
- band Orphan, Halloween Performance (2010)
- White Ash (2014)

== See also ==
- 'The Garden in the Machine: Scott Macdonald (ed.): Leighton Pierce (USA: Oxford University Press, 2004) (English)
- "Interview at Ann Arbour: AAFF50: Leighton Pierce (2011, 1:39min)
