= Stephanie Maxwell =

American film director

- Born: California, U.S.
- Occupations: Filmmaker; Animator
- Years active: 1984–present

Stephanie Angela Maxwell is an animator, filmmaker and professor emeritus in the School of Film and Animation at the Rochester Institute of Technology. She specializes in hand-painted experimental abstract animation. Her techniques include direct-on-film painting, motion painting, object animation, copier techniques, and live action manipulation. Most of her works are collaborations with composers.

Stephanie Maxwell's works have been presented in many international festivals and solo retrospectives, including the Northwest Film Forum, the Downtown Los Angeles Film Festival, and the Ottawa International Animation Festival. She was co-founder and co-director for 12 years of the ImageMovementSound festivals, an annual festival of collaborative productions by interdisciplinary artists.

== Works ==
Stephanie Maxwell's films include:

- Aquarium (2018), Aquarium by Camille Saint-Saëns, arranged by Max Berlin
- River (2015), composer Tom Davis
- Ocean (2014), composer Michaela Eremiasova
- Marimba Quartet (2014), composer Michael Burritt
- tzzzz! (2010), composer Yuya Takeda
- Currents (2008), a collaborative work with Michaela Eremiasova and Jairo Duarte-Lopez
- Time Streams (2003), a collaborative work with composer Allan Schindler
- Nocturne (1999), a collaborative work with composer Greg Wilder
- Driving Abstractions (1997), composer Bill Haslett

== Publications ==
- "Why I work direct on film", Animation, vol. 7, spring 1999
