= Shit Girls Say =

Humorous Twitter series

Shit Girls Say is a humorous Twitter feed and web series created by Canadian writers Kyle Humphrey and Graydon Sheppard. The series jokes about female conversation.

== Twitter ==
The Twitter account @shitgirlssay was launched in April 2011, and promoted by Sheppard through his film and music industry contacts.

As of August 2012, they had 1.6 million Twitter followers.

== Videos ==
At one point, Toronto International Film Festival artistic director Cameron Bailey tweeted that he hoped the Twitter feed would be made into a movie. By that point, Juliette Lewis had already filmed an appearance in the first video.

The original video, as of September 2012, had 30 million views.

The boyfriend in some videos is played by Humphrey.

Becoming an Internet meme, the series itself has been parodied on YouTube as a snowclone for other demographics, both for humorous effect and non-humorous, political effect. Some materials suggest that at least 700 imitation videos were created, while other reports suggest over 1000. Among them are "S--- Liz Lemon Says", the favourite imitator of the creators.

The fourth video debuted at the 2012 Toronto International Film Festival, in a Maverick session hosted by George Stromboulopoulos. Other sessions in the series talked with Johnny Depp and Javier Bardem.

Videos scripts are written as a team, and Sheppard directs. Sheppard auditioned for the role of Betsy Putch in The Mindy Project, admittedly bombing, a role given to Zoe Jarman.

== Book (2012) ==
Sh*t Girls Say
- Author: Kyle Humphrey, Graydon Sheppard
- Language: English
- Genre: Humour
- Publisher: Harlequin and 4TheState (UK)
- Publication date: September 18, 2012
- Publication place: Canada
- Media type: Print (hardcover)
- Pages: 96
- ISBN: 0373892756

A book released in Britain by 4TheState, entitled Sh*t Girls Say, used graphics to illustrate each of the chosen phrases.

Launch parties were held in Toronto and Los Angeles.

When running the Twitter feed, a book was one of their initial interests; they feel the videos helped them reach the goal.

== See also ==
- List of Internet phenomena
