= Vigántpetend =

- Flag Coat of arms

- Location of Veszprém county in Hungary

- Location of Vigántpetend
- Coordinates: 46.96521°N 17.62883°E
- Country: Hungary
- County: Veszprém

Area
  - Total: 11.19 km^{2} (4.32 sq mi)

Population (2004)
  - Total: 227
  - Density: 20.28/km^{2} (52.5/sq mi)
- Time zone: UTC+1 (CET)
  - Summer (DST): UTC+2 (CEST)
- Postal code: 8294
- Area code: 87

Vigántpetend is a village in Veszprém county, Hungary.

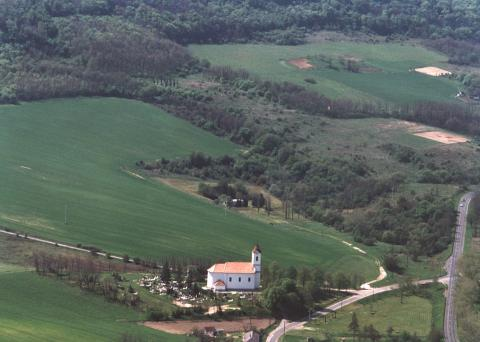
Aerial photography of Vigántpetend church
