= A Fresh Start =

1910 film

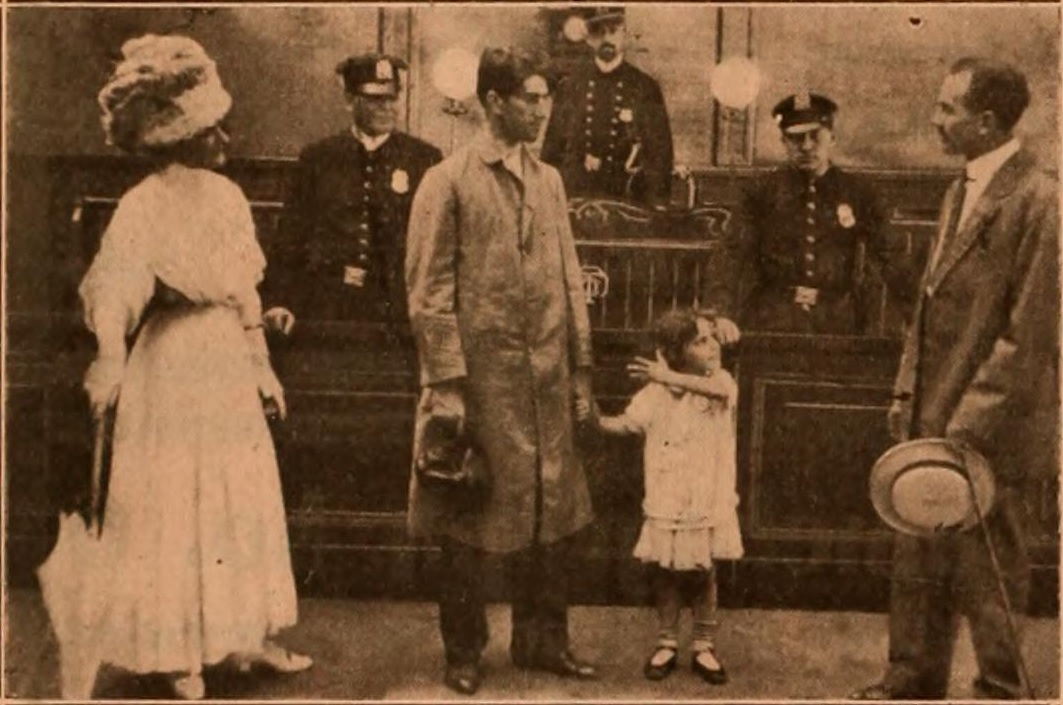
- A surviving film still
- Produced by: Thanhouser Company
- Distributed by: Motion Picture Distributing and Sales Company
- Release date: September 2, 1910
- Country: United States
- Languages: Silent film English inter-titles

A Fresh Start is a 1910 American silent short drama film produced by the Thanhouser Company. The film is the story of Jim, a chauffeur, who is fired from his job for being drunk. Jim becomes a tramp, but decides to reform after a little girl orders her butler to give him food. He encounters her again at the zoo and notices that two men are following the girl and her parents. Jim uncovers a plot to kidnap her and takes the place of their chauffeur. Jim then drives the kidnappers to the police station and secures a new position as the family's chauffeur. According to a trade review, the actual kidnapping scene and where Jim overpowers the villain's chauffeur is not actually depicted. The reviewer also stated the strength of the production is not in the plot, but in the staging and photography. The film was released on September 2, 1910, and it likely had a wide national release. The film is presumed lost.

== Plot ==
Though the film is presumed lost, a synopsis survives in The Moving Picture World from September 3, 1910. It states: "Jim, an expert chauffeur, is discharged from a garage, for insobriety. Penniless and being unable to obtain a new situation, he takes to the road, a common tramp. At one house where he applies for food, he is harshly refused, and is about to turn away and try his luck elsewhere, when little Marie, the daughter of the house, comes to his assistance and orders the butler to at once give him the food he requires. She also picks a rose for him from the garden. Jim strolls into a nearby park and sits on a bench to enjoy his lunch. He is about to take a drink from the ever-present flask, which he takes from his pocket, when the sight of the rose, which the sweet-faced little girl gave him, inspires him with a desire to reform. He throws the flask from him, and refreshed by the lunch, he starts out with a new ambition to face the world."

"Little Marie also visits the park with her parents. While viewing the wonderful zoo it contains she is seen and recognized by Jim. While admiring the little girl and viewing her enjoyment over the wonders of the zoo, Jim notices that two evil-looking men are apparently shadowing the little one and her parents. Jim's suspicions are aroused, and he determines to watch closely the actions of the mysterious pair. He finds that they have arranged with a chauffeur to assist in carrying off little Marie and holding her for ransom. Seizing an opportune moment, Jim forces the plotting chauffeur to turn over his auto, and disguised in the other man's coat, cap and goggles, he calmly awaits the conspirators. When the two wicked men return, after having successful enticed Marie away from her parents, they give the driver of their auto directions as to where to drive. Jim simply nods assent and drives quickly off, but instead of taking them to the destination they directed, he lands them safe at the police station, where they are quickly taken into custody. Here Marie is united to her parents, whom she easily persuades to offer her rescuer a life position."

== Production ==
The writer of the scenario is unknown, but it was most likely Lloyd Lonergan. He was an experienced newspaperman employed by The New York Evening World while writing scripts for the Thanhouser productions. The film director is unknown, but it may have been Barry O'Neil. Film historian Q. David Bowers does not attribute a cameraman for this production, but at least two possible candidates exist. Blair Smith was the first cameraman of the Thanhouser company, but he was soon joined by Carl Louis Gregory who had years of experience as a still and motion picture photographer. The role of the cameraman was uncredited in 1910 productions. Only the role of Marie Eline is cited by Bowers, but a surviving film still raises the possibility of identifying several more actors in the production. Bowers states that most of the credits are fragmentary for 1910 Thanhouser productions.

Little is known on the actual production of the film, but The New York Dramatic Mirror reviewer provided some insight into the production. The review and the synopsis are at odds on several aspects including on whether or not the man was fired for drunkenness or for no reason. In this case, it can be assumed that a drunken state was either not depicted or done inadequately. The reviewer states the "impossible parts of the plot are gracefully omitted" in reference to the abduction of the little girl played by Marie Eline and the overpowering of the chauffeur. Here the synopsis also differs, saying the girl is enticed away instead of being kidnapped. Though the overpowering of the chauffeur is required and acknowledged in the synopsis, the reviewer makes clear the actual method is not depicted. The reviewer also had a keen eye for detail, stating that the passengers disembarked into the middle of the street instead of on the sidewalk. The final scene's setting is captured in a surviving film still that shows the little girl persuading her parents to hire Jim in the police station with three officers looking on in the background.

== Release and reception ==
The single reel drama, approximately 1,000 feet long, was released on September 2, 1910. The film was distributed by the Motion Picture Distributing and Sales Company. The film likely had a wide release like other Thanhouser releases. Known advertisements by theaters include those in Minnesota, Kansas, and Indiana. The film received mainly positive reviews from trade publications including The New York Dramatic Mirror which stated, "Although the story of the film does not promise a great deal, the scenes are developed with enough care for details to carry it easily. More is due to the stage management in this case than to the author. A chauffeur, dismissed for no reason by his employer, is down and out. Resorting to beggary, he is kindly treated by a little girl whom he later repays by rescuing her from two abductors. The grateful parents immediately give him a new chance at which he doubtless makes good. Except for the point where the beggar overhears the accomplices, the acting is good. The impossible parts of the plot are gracefully omitted - the abduction itself, and the overpowering of the chauffeur who was in the plot. In the last scene it is noted that the occupants of the automobile all disembark into the middle of the street instead of upon the sidewalk. Doubtless their excitement excuses their indiscretion." This review serves to highlight the actual action of the lost film and some of the execution of the scenes. The reviewer states that the chauffeur is dismissed for no reason, whereas the synopsis for drunkenness and it is possible that the scene was not depicted. Walton of The Moving Picture News approved of the film for its plot and execution. The Moving Picture World review is a more neutral one, but it concludes that, "[p]ictures like this might serve as an encouragement to reformation, but it is better to consider them as a species of entertainment, not to be despised, and yet, on the other hand, not to be accepted too literally."

== See also ==
- List of American films of 1910
