= Mike Clattenburg =

Canadian filmmaker and producer

- Born: March 21, 1967 (age 59)
- Occupations: Television and film director, producer, screenwriter
- Years active: Since 1995
- Spouse: Stephanie Joline (m. 2009; div. 2015)

Mike Clattenburg (born March 21, 1967) is a Canadian television and film director, producer and screenwriter. He is best known as creator, executive producer, writer and director of the comedy series Trailer Park Boys (2001–2007), for his work with This Hour Has 22 Minutes (2004), and as the co-creator of the Adult Swim series Black Jesus (2014–2019).

== Early life ==
A native of Cole Harbour, a suburb of Halifax, Nova Scotia, Clattenburg spent his years after high school as drummer in a Police-inspired rock band, The Spawning Grunions.

He was formerly married to filmmaker Stephanie Joline from 2009 to 2015.

== Career ==
Clattenburg's jump from music to television began with his co-hosting and production of a Halifax Cable 10 show, That Damn Cable Show, from 1990 to 1993. The program featured on-location interviews and profiles of Halifax entertainers, many of whom were acquaintances of Clattenburg's through his band contacts. Wedged in between the entertainer segments were comedic three-minute clips that displayed his early talent for irreverent film making. That Damn Cable Show was remarkable for its high production values despite being a local cable channel production on a shoestring budget and made an early name for Clattenburg in film production circles.

Outgrowing the local cable television station, Clattenburg made the move to professional television production with work on comedy and drama programs at CBC Television, including Pit Pony, Street Cents, The Bette Show, and a variety of segments for Sesame Street. His credits include the direction of music videos for Gord Downie, Len, The Tragically Hip, comedy rap group Three Loco, and, most recently, a rap video for Far East Movement featuring Riff Raff of Three Loco.

In addition to Trailer Park Boys and its associated films Trailer Park Boys: The Movie, Trailer Park Boys: Countdown to Liquor Day and Trailer Park Boys 3: Don't Legalize It, Clattenburg also directed the films Afghan Luke and Moving Day, which were released in Toronto and Halifax on July 20, 2012, and the short film Crackin' Down Hard.

He is co-creator, executive producer, co-writer (along with Aaron McGruder), and director of the Adult Swim series Black Jesus, which premiered on August 7, 2014.

He is co-creator (along with Mike O'Neill from Trailer Park Boys), director and an executive producer of Canadian television comedy series Crawford, which premiered as a streaming video on February 2, 2018.

== Filmography ==
Year	Title	Notes
1995	The Cart Boy	Short film
1996	Liquor Store	Short film
1998	One Last Shot	Short film
1999	Trailer Park Boys	Feature film
2006	Trailer Park Boys: The Movie	Feature film
2009	Trailer Park Boys: Countdown to Liquor Day	Feature film
2011	Afghan Luke	Feature film
2012	Moving Day	Feature film
2014	Trailer Park Boys: Don't Legalize It	Feature film

Year	Title	Notes
1999–2000	Pit Pony	
2001–2007	Trailer Park Boys	Creator
2004	This Hour Has 22 Minutes	
2010	Republic of Doyle	
2012	Mr. D	
2013	Satisfaction	
2014–2019	Black Jesus	Creator
2018	Crawford	Creator
