= Aerlyn Weissman =

Canadian documentary filmmaker (born 1947)

- Born: 1947 (age 78–79); Chicago, Illinois, U.S.
- Occupations: documentary filmmaker, teacher
- Known for: Forbidden Love: The Unashamed Stories of Lesbian Lives

Aerlyn Weissman (born 1947 in Chicago, Illinois) is a two-time Genie Award-winning Canadian documentary filmmaker and political activist on behalf of the lesbian community.

== Career ==
Weissman trained in sound recording in the United States before coming to Canada in 1970, and worked as a sound designer at the National Film Board of Canada - one of very few women in that role. She worked on Janis Cole and Holly Dale’s P4W: Prison for Women (1981), and Hookers on Davie (1984). After the success of Forbidden Love, Weissman collaborated with Lynne Fernie on a film about lesbian writer Jane Rule, the Genie-winning Fiction and Other Truths: A Film About Jane Rule (1995). She also directed the film Without Fear (1993), about women surviving violence. Weissman's indie documentary Little Sister’s vs Big Brother, a stirring and comprehensive epic of the bookstore's struggles against state censorship, premiered in 2002. Included in the NFB's 2003 queer pedagogical package, this film's heroic portraits of the bookstore's activist triumvirate Janine Fuller, Jim Deva, Bruce Smyth (and writer/employee Mark Macdonald), are already enshrined in the Canadian queer pantheon. Since 2001 Weissman has also directed for the TV documentary series KinK, as well as making WebCam Girls (2004, 52).

She is best known for the Genie Award-winning 1992 film Forbidden Love: The Unashamed Stories of Lesbian Lives, which she co-directed with Lynne Fernie, and the 2002 film Little Sister's vs. Big Brother, about the longstanding censorship battle between Canada Customs and Little Sister's Book and Art Emporium, a prominent LGBT bookstore in Vancouver. She was one of the co-directors, alongside Louise Clark, Jackie Burroughs, John Walker and John Frizzell, of the landmark Canadian feminist feature film A Winter Tan (1987), the controversial semi-fictional account of Maryse Holder's sex odyssey to Mexico.

Her other films include Scams, Schemes, and Scoundrels (1996), Lost Secrets of Ancient Medicine: The Blue Buddha in Russia (2006) and The Portside (2009), as well as episodes of the television series KinK.

Based in Vancouver, Weissman has studied at the Centre for Digital Media and taught at Emily Carr University of Art and Design. Currently, she mentors at the Gulf Islands Film and Television School on Galiano Island, British Columbia. She has also participated in many panels and academic symposiums about filmmaking, and offers workshops at VIVO, a Vancouver Media Arts Centre. She is a member of the Canadian Independent Film Caucus, and Vancouver Women in Film and Television, and received the award for Woman of the Year in 1996. Now living on the West Coast of British Columbia, she continues to explore her interest in independent cinema and innovative television.

Alongside documentary making, Weissman has worked on digital media projects including interactive signage for Sky Train commuters of InTransit BC, creating a template for heritage tourism in BC with The Saturna Project, and sustainable strategies for the fishing industry with the UBC Fisheries Project.

Weissman's documentary Little Sister's vs. Big Brother was included in the NFB's 2003 queer pedagogical package.

She is interviewed in Matthew Hays' 2007 Lambda Literary Award-winning book The View from Here: Conversations with Gay and Lesbian Filmmakers.

== Themes ==
Aerlyn Weissman's work has covered topics ranging from forensic archaeology, digital technologies, censorship, and social software. She is also interested in politics and aesthetics of urban space, locative art/mapping, public rituals, and peace building.

Her work is deeply engaged with Canadian women's, sexual, and lesbian history. She has remarked that Studio D films often ignored the Canadian context and wanted to take on the “politics of specificity”.

== Personal life ==
Aerlyn Weissman was born in Chicago and moved to Canada in 1970.

== Awards ==
Fiction and Other Truths: A Film About Jane Rule won the 1996 Genie Award for Best Short Documentary, the L.A. Outfest Outstanding Documentary Short Film, as well as Best Documentary at the San Francisco International Lesbian & Gay Film Festival. Weissman also won the Genie Award for Best Feature Length Documentary in 1993 for Forbidden Love: The Unashamed Stories of Lesbian Lives. Her first feature film, A Winter Tan was nominated for Best Picture, Best Direction, Best Actress, and Best Sound at the 1989 Genies. She received the Vancouver Women in Film and Television award for Woman of the Year in 1996. She has received two Gemini Awards for her recording excellence. She was awarded the Mayor's Arts Award for Film and New Media in 2009 by the City of Vancouver. [10] She received an honourable mention in 2008 for her film Crossing at the Webby Awards. For her film Webcam Girls has a HotDocs Selection.

== Filmography ==
=== Director ===
- A Winter Tan, 1987
- Forbidden Love: The Unashamed Stories of Lesbian Lives, 1992
- Fiction and Other Truths: A Film About Jane Rule, 1995
- Scams, Schemes, and Scoundrels, 2002
- Little Sister's vs. Big Brother, 2002
- KinK, 2002–2003
- Lost Secrets of Ancient Medicine: The Journey of the Blue Buddha, 2006
- Lost Secrets of Ancient Medicine: The Blue Buddha in Russia, 2006
- The Portside, 2009
- Beyond Gay: The Politics of Pride, 2009

=== Sound ===
- My Friends Call Me Tony, 1975
- Tree Power, 1979
- A Wives' Tale (Une histoire de femmes), 1980
- The Breakthrough, 1981
- The KGB Connections, 1982
- Portrait of the Artist... as an Old Lady, 1982
- Body by Garret, 1982
- Hookers on Davie, 1984
- Inner Rhythm 1986
- Blue Snake, 1986
- No Way! Not Me, 1987
- Eternal Earth, 1987
- Artist on Fire, 1987
- Calling the Shots, 1988
- Strand: Under the Dark Cloth, 1989
- Meeting Place, 1990
- Distress Signals, 1990
- John Wyre: Drawing on Sound, 1991

== See also ==
- List of female film and television directors
- List of lesbian filmmakers
- List of LGBT-related films directed by women
