= Terry Rusling =

- Born: April 2, 1931
- Origin: Canada
- Died: November 27, 1974 (aged 43)
- Genre: Electronic
- Occupation: Composer
- Instrument: Electronic
- Years active: 1963–72

Terry Rusling (April 2, 1931 – November 27, 1974) was a Canadian electronic music composer, who used graphic notation. Some of his works were used to accompany radio and television broadcasts.

Rusling graphic notation from Notations by John Cage

== Introduction to electronic composition ==
Terry Rusling worked as an engineer for the Canadian Broadcasting Corporation (CBC). He was on-air engineer for the Gilmour's Albums hosted by CBC broadcaster Clyde Gilmour. In the early 1960s, Morris Surdin, a composer working at the CBC, suggested to Rusling that he try out the electronic studio at University of Toronto, Faculty of Music (UTEMS). Through Surdin, Rusling was introduced to Dr. Myron Schaeffer, to whom he submitted his first electronic compositions. Schaeffer invited Rusling to attend the graduate seminar at the University of Toronto, Faculty of Music, using the renowned electronic music studio (UTEMS) which included instruments designed by Hugh LeCaine such as the Special Purpose Tape Recorder. Rusling was awarded the title of Research Associate at the University of Toronto Faculty of Music. Among the notable composers who studied at University of Toronto's Electronic Music Studio (UTEMS) University of Toronto, Faculty of Music were John Mills-Cockell, Pauline Oliveros, Ann Southam, Gustav Ciamaga, John Beckwith, among others. During this period he was also known to be the recipient of a Canada Council Grant in support of his travel, education and production of electronic music. After receiving the grant he travelled to studios in the US and Europe. He continued his studies and composed music in studios at the Psycho Acoustic Institute at Ghent University, Belgium; the University of Utrecht; and the University of Illinois. He also did work at the University of Rochester with Wayne Barlow as well as in Paris where he studied with Pierre Schaeffer. He spent two months at the Phillips lab in Holland learning about their new electronic equipment. All of Terry's music was precisely notated using mathematics and other symbols. His music was often inspired by his interest in visual art. During this period Terry also reported on an interview on CBC Radio that he worked at the BBC Radiophonic. He specifically mentions Barry Burmage.

Composition No. 5 by Terry Rusling

== Broadcasts, exhibitions and performances ==
Several of his works, including The Trains, a piece of musique concrète, were broadcast on the CBC and he composed an electronic theme for the nightly news. One of his public performances of electronic music was at the Bohemian Embassy in Toronto October 1964. He also collaborated with visual artist Zbigniew Blazeje in a large multimedia exhibition in 1967 called Audio Kinetic Environment which began at the Art Gallery of Ontario and travelled to other galleries in Canada. The exhibit initially opened with music prepared by Blazeje. In an interview with Terry Rusling on CBC Radio, Rusling said that Blazeje approached him as he found the music he made was not good enough. Rusling stated he spent some time watching the kinetic installation and then proceeded to create a new score for the exhibition in Toronto and this music was used throughout the exhibit's tour of Canada. The installation toured to other galleries including the Montreal Museum of Fine Arts. The music was set to trigger lights in the installation. On March 1 he was part of the crew involved in setting up the famous chess match between John Cage and Marcel Duchamp where a move on the chess board would trigger electronic music, This was part of Sightsoundsystems festival in 1968. There was also a radio program combining Rusling's music with Earle Birney's sound poetry on CBC Radio. After the piece was performed they discussed their personal approaches to their art forms. Birney discussed various approaches he took including sound poetry and using chance techniques, such as cutting phrases from newspapers including comics into bits of paper and finding combinations by chance. A related collaboration with poet Gwendolyn MacEwen, combining poetry with electronic music was also broadcast on CBC Radio. Rusling also worked with performance artist and sound poet Bob Cobbing and dancer Rima Brodie.

== Audio-Kinetic Environment ==
Audio-Kinetic Environment, in collaboration with Zbigniew Blazeje with Terry Rusling providing electronic music. The exhibition toured 11 cities with 12 showings:

- Albright–Knox Art Gallery, Buffalo, 1965.
- Art Gallery of Ontario, Toronto, January 20 – February 6, 1966
- Mackenzie Art Gallery, Regina, February 17 – March 10, 1966
- Mendel Art Gallery, Saskatoon, March 24 – April 14, 1966
- Winnipeg Art Gallery, Winnipeg, April 28 – May 19, 1966.
- Montreal Museum of Fine Arts, Montreal, June 28 – August 21, 1966.
- Confederation Centre Art Gallery, Charlottetown, September 20 – October 9, 1966.
- New Brunswick Museum, Saint John, November 10 – December 11, 1966
- Agnes Etherington Art Centre, Kingston, January 6–29, 1967.
- UBC Fine Arts Gallery (now Morris and Helen Belkin Art Gallery) February 1 to 11, 1967

The installation was described in ArtsCanada February 1967 as follows: "Toronto artist Zbigniew Blazeje's Audio-Kinetic Environment, seen at the Art Gallery of Ontario, Toronto, last year (January 19 – February 2, 1966) consisted of about twenty-two panels and several moving pieces constructed of wood and plastic. All were coated with fluorescent and phosphorescent paints. Their colours were activated by the continuous play of a lighting system synchronized to taped electronic music patterns." A notice of the exhibit travelling throughout Canada was printed in Maclean's magazine. "The one man show by Zbigniew Blazeje, lasted just about the same length of time. At least the demonstration part did. The works themselves, in their undemonstrated state, required much longer. Basically they are constructions of clear rectangular plastic plates, wood strips and bars on several parallel planes, having some of the bars painted in bright, strong luminous colours. Most of the pieces were wall-mounted, but there were some anchored and some suspended mobiles. In the centre of the room there was a cluster of red and blue lights of varying intensities, which were activated by electronic sounds from a tape prepared by Terry Rusling. In the darkened room, the works took on new colours, changing as the lights changed, and new shapes. Sometimes, depending on the rhythms from the track, they seemed to move within themselves. … Residents swamped the gallery on opening night 2000 strong — more than came for Picasso or Canaletto."

== Other work ==
His compositions are listed in International Electronic Music Catalog compiled by Hugh Davies (M.I.T. 1969). His compositions are also listed in an article in Dimensions magazine about University of Toronto Electronic Music Studios. His scores were submitted to John Cage's Notations project and two items are included in the book and demonstrate his use of graphic notation. He composed incidental music for CBC radio shows such as Trains (1966) a documentary program on the railroads of Canada produced by Allan Anderson and Val Clery. He also composed incidental music for the TV show Telescope (TV series), in particular, an episode on Marshall McLuhan (1967). Another project Terry produced for CBC Radio was "On The Beatles." The show is described in the CBC's magazine RPM Weekly: "The show is a montage of dialogue, musical sound effects and electronic music. Rusling has chosen his own favourite Beatle songs over which he often superimposes electronic effects. addition to this he composed pure experimental music.

== Compositions ==
Compositions

=== 1964 ===
- Composition No. 1
- Var. 3 Comp. 1
- Bullet 3
- on hearing the first sine tone – experiment

=== 1965 ===
- Ballet Mega

1. Conclusion: piano.
2. Title: timpani, vibes, piano, garbage can, tone signal
3. If I Could Find the Thing to Hate: guitar, human voice, tone signal
4. The Predator?: human voice, garbage can
5. They Marry – They Meet: tone signal, garbage can, square wave, sine tone
6. Three Blind Etc. - tone signal, garbage can, square wave, pulse, vibes, piano
7. In Which Non-Being is Absolution: piano, violin
8. Prelude – tone signals.

- Black and White'
- Frag. Des.
- Freedom
- Furthermore
- Haiku No. 1
- Sans Motion Quickly
- Spatial Motion
- Variation
- Variations on Black and White
- Comp. K

=== 1966 ===
- Untitled
- Basu Sen (radio)
- Dag Hammerskold Memorial (radio)
- The Trains (radio): Created the electronic theme music for the series.
- Military Mind (radio)
- Fate vs. Will (radio)
- Industrial State (radio)
- Law versus Revolution (radio)
- Audio Kinetic Environment (Installation) with artist Zbigniew Blazeje. Rusling created music for this installation which was installed in the Art Gallery of Ontario. The music. was set to trigger the lights in the installation. The installation was also shown at the Stable Gallery of the Montreal Museum of Fine Arts, as well as seven other locations. At first Blazeje installed Audio Kinetic Environment at the Art Gallery of Ontario then Art Gallery of Toronto in 1966 using pre-recorded music. He was not satisfied with the music and contacted Terry Rusling to compose music for the installation. Audio Kinetic Environment travelled to 8 cities in all as well as to Expo 67.

=== 1967 ===
- Telescope (TV) "McLuhan is the Message"

=== 1968 ===
- Musical chess mighty boring opener for Sightsoundsystems. by William Littler, Toronto Star, March 6, 1968, page B41 (Rusling was a technical assistant for this performance).
- Marcel Duchamp, the old master. by Robert Fulford, Toronto Star, March 6, 1968, page B41. A second review of the same performance.

=== Undated works ===
- Collaborations:
1. Earle Birney reads poetry with electronic accompaniment by Terry Rusling which was broadcast on CBC Radio.
2. Gwendolyn MacEwen reads her poem Subliminal over electronic music by Terry Rusling which was broadcast on CBC Radio.
3. Bob Cobbing

=== Posthumous notices ===
In 2018 Terry Rusling was awarded Associate Composer status posthumously by the Canadian Music Centre. His nomination and profile can be seen there. Also in 2018 Brenda Longfellow made a Documentary about Gwendolyn MacEwen called Shadowmaker, Gwendolyn MacEwen, poet. It features some of Rusling's music from his collaboration with the poet. Musicworks magazine published an online review of the Rusling CD by Nick Storring. In October 2019 Tina Kiik reviewed all 3 of the CDs in the Spurn series in The Whole Note Magazine, pp. 71–72 remarking that "Rusling's early electronic music holds current sound appeal while also, at its very best, foreshadowing future sounds." In 2020 Nova Scotia guitarist and composer Amy Brandon in her article "An Inexhaustible Source of Wild Music" in Musicworks 137 looking over electronic music studios at University of Toronto and McGill University, makes reference to Rusling's work. The CD accompanying the magazine includes a track by Rusling, "If I Could Find A Thing To Hate." A review of "The Machine is Broken" by Dave Madden appeared on Squid's Ear (2019-09-10) who said of the CD: "...the pieces would fit evenly in the subversive, forward-thinking library music of the BBC Radiophonic experimental cadre as well as on a playlist with Louis and Bebe Barron..."

=== Recordings ===
a) Terry Rusling, The Machine is Broken, (2019), Spool (Spurn 3) Produced by David Porter and Daniel Kernohan.
b) Terry Rusling, Rusling Compositions, CD-R (S3CD1), 'List of all items found in EMS Archive, Excel spreadsheet. A list of all items that were originally found in the University of Illinois at Urbana-Champaign Electronic Music Studio archives. (ideals.Illinois.edu/handle/2142/100315).
c) UTEMS tape collection: Rusling, Terry, 1931-1974: "Composition No. 1" Box 4.
d) Canadian Broadcasting Corporation.|University of Toronto. Electronic Music Studio, Box 2 - 7.135 Works : selections Rusling, Terry, 1931-1974 Canadian Broadcasting Corporation.|University of Toronto. Electronic Music Studio.
