= Gwendolyn MacEwen =

Canadian poet and novelist (1941–1987)

- Born: Gwendolyn Margaret MacEwen; 1 September 1941; Toronto, Ontario
- Died: 29 November 1987 (aged 46); Toronto, Ontario
- Education: High school dropout, autodidact
- Occupation: Writer
- Writing career
- Language: English
- Notable awards: Governor General's Award

Gwendolyn Margaret MacEwen (1 September 1941 – 29 November 1987) was a Canadian poet and novelist. A "sophisticated, wide-ranging and thoughtful writer," she published more than 20 books in her life. "A sense of magic and mystery from her own interests in the Gnostics, Ancient Egypt and magic itself, and from her wonderment at life and death, makes her writing unique.... She's still regarded by most as one of Canada's greatest poets."

== Life ==
MacEwen was born in Toronto, Ontario. Her mother, Elsie, spent much of her life as a patient in mental health institutions. Her father, Alick, suffered from alcoholism. Gwendolyn MacEwen grew up in the High Park area of the city, and attended Western Technical-Commercial School.

MacEwan's first poem was published in The Canadian Forum when she was only 17, and she left school at 18 to pursue a writing career. By 18 she had written her first novel, Julian the Magician.

"She was small and slight, with a round pale face, huge blue eyes usually rimmed in kohl (Type of eyeliner and cosmetic), and long dark straight hair."

Her first book of poetry, The Drunken Clock, was published in 1961 in Toronto, then the centre of a literary revival in Canada, encouraged by the editor Robert Weaver and influential teacher Northrop Frye. MacEwen was thus in touch with James Reaney, Margaret Atwood, Dennis Lee, etc. She married poet Milton Acorn, 19 years her senior, in 1962, although they divorced two years later.

She published over twenty books, in a variety of genres. She also wrote numerous radio docudramas for the Canadian Broadcasting Corporation (CBC), including a "much-admired radio drama", Terror and Erebus, in 1965 which featured music by Terry Rusling.

With her second husband, Greek musician Niko Tsingos, MacEwen opened a Toronto coffeehouse, The Trojan Horse, in 1972. She and Tsingos translated some of the poetry of contemporary Greek writer Yiannis Ritsos (published in her 1981 book Trojan Women).

She taught herself to read Hebrew, Arabic, Greek, and French, and translated writers from each of those languages. In 1978 her translation of Euripides' drama The Trojan Women was first performed in Toronto.

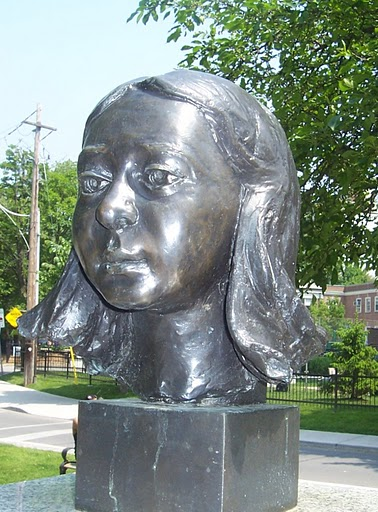
Sculpture of MacEwen in Gwendolyn MacEwen Park

She served as writer in residence at the University of Western Ontario in 1985, and the University of Toronto in 1986 and 1987.

During the last years of her life she was in a relationship with street writer Crad Kilodney (Lou Trifon).

MacEwen died in 1987, at the age of 46, of health problems related to alcoholism. She is buried in Toronto's Mount Pleasant Cemetery.

== Writing ==
"A sophisticated, wide-ranging and thoughtful writer," says The Canadian Encyclopedia, MacEwen "displayed a commanding interest in magic and history as well as an elaborate and penetrating dexterity in her versecraft."

Her two novels – Julian the Magician, dealing with the ambiguous relationship between the hermetic philosophies of the early Renaissance and Christianity; and King of Egypt, King of Dreams, which imaginatively reconstructed the life and religious reformation of Egyptian pharaoh Akhenaton – blend fantasy and history.

== Recognition ==
MacEwen won the Governor General's Award in 1969 for her poetry collection The Shadow Maker. She was awarded a second Governor General's Award posthumously in 1987 for Afterworlds.

Other awards and prizes MacEwen won include the CBC New Canadian Writing Contest for poetry in 1965; the A.J.M. Smith Poetry Award in 1973; the Borestone Mountain Poetry Award in 1983; the CBC Literary Competition, for short story in 1983; and the Du Maurier Awards, gold and silver for poetry, in 1983.

Her writing has been translated into many languages including Chinese, French, German, and Italian.

Rosemary Sullivan published a biography of MacEwen, Shadow Maker: The Life of Gwendolyn MacEwen, in 1995, which itself won the Governor General's Award, for non-fiction in 1995.

Fictional tributes to MacEwen have been published by Margaret Atwood (the short story "Isis in Darkness"), and Lorne S. Jones (the novel Mighty Oaks).

A one-woman play by Linda Griffiths, Alien Creature: A Visitation from Gwendolyn MacEwen, won the Dora Mavor Moore Award and the Chalmers Award in 2000.

Her book of poems written in 1969 called The Shadow-Maker was set to music by Dutch/Canadian composer Rudi Martinus van Dijk in 1977. As a result, one of the highlights of the 1978-79 season of the Toronto Symphony Orchestra included the world premiere of Van Dijk's The Shadow-Maker under the direction of Mario Bernardi and featuring Canadian baritone Victor Braun. It was performed at Massey Hall in Toronto, October 1978. Gwendolyn MacEwan attended the Massey Hall performances and was deeply struck by the music's setting of her work. The biographer of MacEwan, Rosemary Sullivan, quotes the composer Van Dijk in her book: "What attracted me to the poetry was the substance behind the subject matter - namely the dream. The poetry attempts, it seems to me, to lift the veil of 'Maya' (illusion). Is our sensuous experience reality or illusion? MacEwan has something in common with Strindberg and D.H. Lawrence, as an explorer of these dark corners of the soul that most of us shut out conveniently, in order to create a safe but illusory reality." As Dutch musicologist Maarten Brandt wrote, "The bold and expressionistic side of Alban Berg and Arnold Schoenberg is found in van Dijk’s setting of Gwendolyn MacEwan's The Shadow-Maker for baritone and large orchestra, written in 1977. Yet, as in every single composition by van Dijk, tonal references are present here as well, demonstrating a kinship not only with Alban Berg, but also with Benjamin Britten, Hans Werner Henze, Michael Tippett and Frank Martin; all of them composers who have not simply exploited the resources available to them, but rather were grateful ‘inhabitants’ of a rich and saturated musical landscape."

Twenty years later a documentary film by Brenda Longfellow, Shadow Maker: Gwendolyn MacEwen, Poet, was made in 1998 and won the Genie Award for Best Short Documentary.

=== Gwendolyn MacEwen Parkette ===
Gwendolyn MacEwen Park
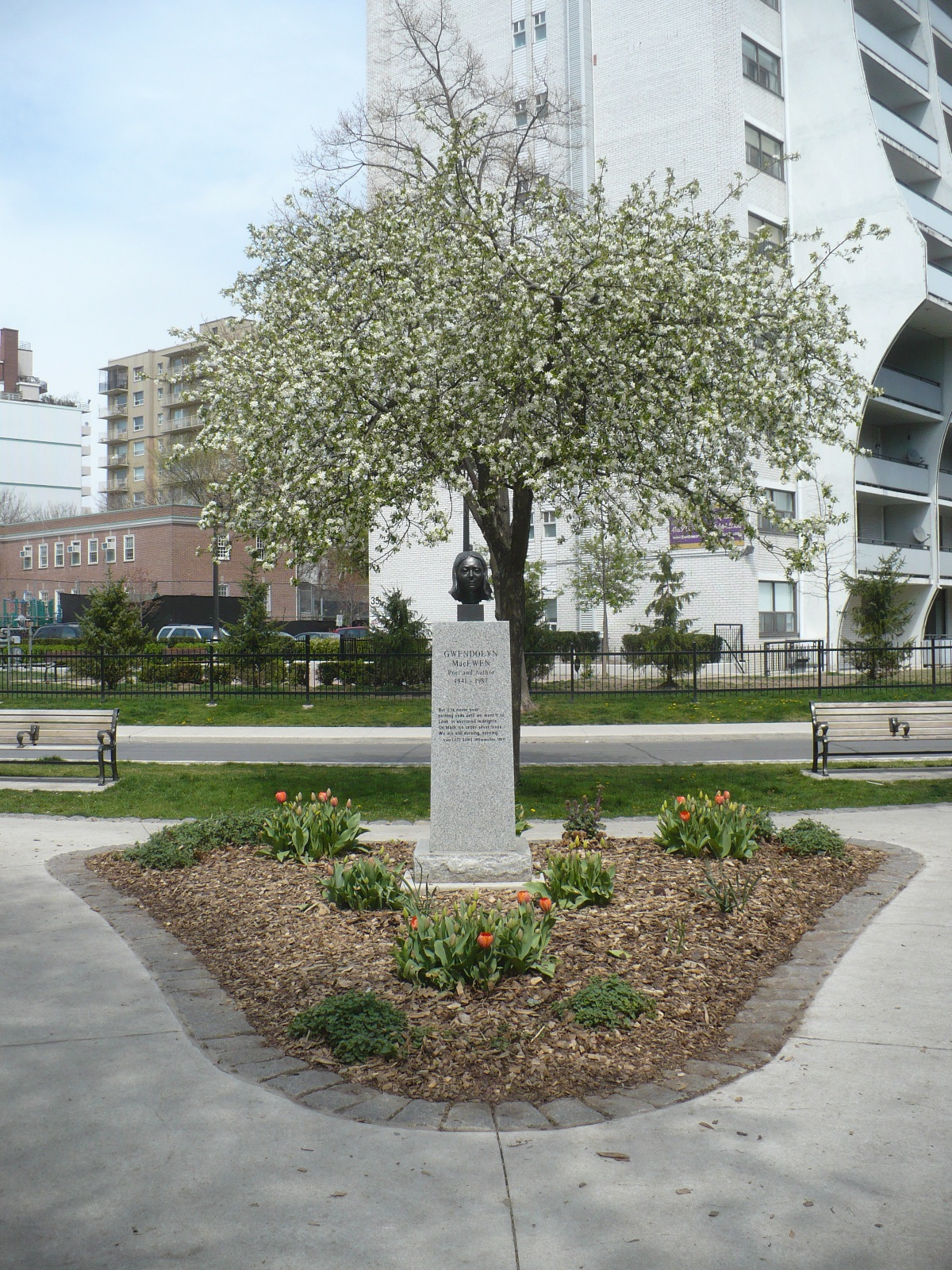
- Interactive map of Gwendolyn MacEwen Park
- Location: Walmer Rd at Lowther Ave, Toronto
- Coordinates: 43°40′07″N 79°24′22″W
- Operator: Toronto Parks

The former Walmer Road Parkette, in The Annex neighbourhood of Toronto, was renamed Gwendolyn MacEwen Parkette in her honor in 1994.

On 9 September 2006, a bronze bust of MacEwen by her friend, sculptor John McCombe Reynolds, was unveiled in the parkette.

The park had been a grassy traffic circle in the middle of Walmer Road at Lowther Avenue, but a $300,000 makeover in 2010, expanded the park and narrowed the surrounding roads. The unique redesigned greenspace reopened 21 July 2010, and writer Claudia Dey read one of MacEwen's poems.

Media related to Gwendolyn MacEwen Park at Wikimedia Commons

== Publications ==
=== Poetry ===
- Selah. Toronto: Aleph Press, 1961.
- The Drunken Clock. Toronto: Aleph Press, 1961.
- The Rising Fire. Toronto: Contact Press, 1963.
- Terror and Erebus (1965)
- A Breakfast for Barbarians. Toronto: Ryerson Press, 1966.
- The Shadow-Maker. Toronto: Macmillan, 1969.
- The Armies of the Moon . Toronto: Macmillan, 1972. ISBN 978-0-7705-0868-5
- Magic Animals: Selected Poems Old and New. Toronto: Macmillan, 1974. ISBN 978-0-7705-1214-9
- The Fire-Eaters. Ottawa: Oberon Press, 1976. ISBN 978-0-88750-179-1
- Trojan Women, 1981.
- The T. E. Lawrence Poems. Oakville: Mosaic Press, 1982.
- Earth-Light: Selected Poetry 1963-1982. Toronto: General Publishing, 1982. ISBN 978-0-7736-1117-7
- The Man with Three Violins 1986 HMS Press (Toronto) ISBN 0-919957-83-8
- Afterworlds. Toronto: McClelland and Stewart, 1987. ISBN 978-0-7710-5428-0
- Atwood, Margaret and Barry Callaghan, eds. The Poetry of Gwendolyn MacEwen: The Early Years (Volume One). Toronto: Exile Editions, 1993. ISBN 978-1-55096-543-8
- Atwood, Margaret and Barry Callaghan, eds. The Poetry of Gwendolyn MacEwen: The Later Years (Volume Two). Toronto: Exile Editions, 1993. ISBN 978-1-55096-547-6
- Gwendolyn MacEwen; Meaghan Strimas; Rosemary Sullivan; Barry Callaghan (2008). The Selected Gwendolyn MacEwen. Exile Editions, Ltd. ISBN 978-1-55096-111-9.

=== Fiction ===
- Julian the Magician. Insomniac Press. 2004 [1963]. ISBN 978-1-894663-57-1.
- King of Egypt, King of Dreams. Insomniac Press. 2004 [1971]. ISBN 978-1-894663-60-1.
- Noman. Ottawa: Oberon Press, 1972.
- Noman's Land: stories Coach House Press, 1985. ISBN 978-0-88910-312-2

=== Non-fiction ===
- Mermaids and Ikons: A Greek Summer. Toronto: House of Anansi, 1978. ISBN 978-0-88784-062-3

=== Children's books ===
- The Chocolate Moose. Toronto: N/C Press, 1979. ISBN 978-0-919601-57-4
- The Honey Drum. Oakville: Mosaic Press, 1983. ISBN 978-0-88962-228-9
- Dragon Sandwiches Black Moss Press, 1987. ISBN 978-0-88753-157-6

=== Drama ===
- Trojan Women after the play by Euripides (includes poems Helen and Oristos by Yannis Ritsos, translated by MacEwen and Niko Tsingos). Toronto: Exile Editions. 2009 [1994, 1981]. 978-1-55096-123-2
- The Birds after the play by Aristophanes. Toronto: Exile Editions. 1993 [1983]. 978-1-55096-065-5

Except where noted, bibliographic information courtesy of Brock University.

== Discography ==
- Open Secret. CBC Learning Systems, 1972. LP T-57191
- Celebration: Famous Canadian Poets CD Canadian Poetry Association – 2001 ISBN 1-55253-032-9 (CD#3) ( with Raymond Souster )

== See also ==
- Canadian literature
- Canadian poetry
- List of Canadian poets
