= Fiction and Other Truths: A Film About Jane Rule =

1995 Canadian documentary film

- Directed by: Lynne Fernie; Aerlyn Weissman
- Produced by: Rina Fraticelli
- Starring: Jane Rule
- Edited by: Cathy Gulkin
- Music by: Kathryn Moses
- Production company: Great Jane Productions
- Distributed by: Filmmakers Library
- Release date: January 9, 1995
- Running time: 57 minutes
- Country: Canada
- Language: English

Fiction and Other Truths: A Film About Jane Rule is a Canadian documentary film, directed by Lynne Fernie and Aerlyn Weissman and released in 1995. The film is a portrait of influential lesbian writer and anti-censorship activist Jane Rule.

The film premiered on January 9, 1995, at the St. Lawrence Centre for the Arts in Toronto, at a gala benefit for the Canadian Lesbian and Gay Archives, before having its television premiere as the debut episode of TVOntario's documentary series The View from Here on January 11. It subsequently screened theatrically elsewhere in Canada, including at a benefit screening for Little Sister's Book and Art Emporium in Vancouver during its censorship dispute with the Canada Border Services Agency.

The film won the Genie Award for Best Short Documentary at the 16th Genie Awards in 1996.
