= Female gaze =

Feminist film theoretical term

In feminist theory, the female gaze is the gaze of the female spectator, character or director of an artistic work.

More than being gender specific, female gaze is an issue of representing women as subjects having agency. As such, people of any gender can create films with a female gaze. It is a response to feminist film theorist Laura Mulvey's term "the male gaze", which represents not only the gaze of a heterosexual male viewer but also the gaze of the male character and the male creator of the film. In that sense it is close, though different, from the Matrixial gaze coined in 1985 by Bracha L. Ettinger.

In contemporary usage, the female gaze has been used to refer to the perspective a female filmmaker (screenwriter/director/producer) brings to a film that might be different from a male view of the subject.

== History ==
Mulvey discussed aspects of voyeurism and fetishism in the male gaze in her article, "Visual Pleasure and Narrative Cinema". She drew from Alfred Hitchcock's 1954 film, Rear Window, applying terms from Sigmund Freud's theories of psychoanalysis to discuss camera angle, narrative choice, and props in the movie while focusing on the concept of the male gaze. From what Jeffries, the protagonist in Rear Window, looks at through his camera to the camera angles in his discussion with his girlfriend, the male gaze is accentuated by each move in Mulvey's article. Mulvey's article focused on the concept of "scopophilia", or a pleasure in gazing and placed women as spectacles to be objectified and viewed, unable to return a gaze. She ultimately rejects most depictions of women in film as inadequate representations of human beings.

== Theoretical implementation ==
The female gaze looks at three viewpoints: the individual who is filming, the characters within the film, and the spectator. These three viewpoints also are part of Mulvey's male gaze, but for the female gaze the focus is on women instead of men. Viewpoints expanded alongside diversity in film genres. Woman's films were a genre that focused on female leads, showing the female as a diegetic story-teller rather than as a spectacle. Movies such as Rebecca and Stella Dallas are examples of such films in which the traditional narrative is told through the female protagonist. This genre of film evolved into "chick flicks" such as 27 Dresses and The Devil Wears Prada. These films are meant to represent the desires of female protagonists and, therefore, to represent the desires of the female movie-viewer.

Zoe Dirse looked at the female gaze through the documentary film genre, analyzing aspects of pleasure and viewer identification. She analyzes the gaze at the points of production and reception. She notes that if the cinematographer is female and the subject is also female, the object of the film takes on a different role. Dirse argues that having a female cinematographer allows women to be viewed as they really are and not as the voyeuristic spectacle that the male gaze makes them out to be. While filming in Cairo, Dirse was in a crowd and observed being noticed by the men around her. At first they seemed curious, and Dirse wondered if it was because of her gender or the fact that she had a camera. It was not long before they began to push past her, and she felt a sense of danger that she felt other women in Cairo shared. This is depicted in her film, Shadow Maker. She said that her gender allowed her to be an unobtrusive observer – unlike a man – when filming Romani women singing.

Paula Marantz Cohen discusses the female gaze in the chick flick genre, with specific attention to the attire women wear. According to her, spectacle overrules plot in films such as The Awful Truth. Irene Dunne's wardrobe is regarded as a central aspect of the film. According to Cohen, the different dresses that Dunne wears are extravagant, but not sexualized. While the clothing may be regarded as comical, it is also supportive to Dunne's independence and femininity. Cohen notes that in the film The Wedding Planner, Jennifer Lopez is fully clothed throughout the entire film. The clothes, as in The Awful Truth, are regarded as comical yet they catch the viewer's eye without sexualizing. Cohen also analyzes the relationship between the female lead stars of these films and their male co-stars. She states that these films truly depict what women want, that they are accentualized in a positive manner and have a partner who amplifies this accentuation.

== Contemporary usage ==
Critics have focused attention on the presence of the female gaze in cinema and television, in works such as The Handmaid's Tale, I Love Dick, Fleabag, and The Love Witch.

The controversial lesbian drama film Blue Is the Warmest Colour received considerable critical comment for the dominance of the male gaze and lack of female gaze, with some reviewers calling it a "patriarchal gaze". Jul Maroh, the author of the book upon which the film was based, was among the harshest critics, saying, "It appears to me this was what was missing on the set: lesbians."

Filmmaker April Mullen has said, "Women have this vulnerability and connection to a depth of emotions that I can see and feel in certain moments of truth in the films we create. To me, the female gaze is transparency – the veil between audience and filmmaker is thin, and that allows people in more."

Art historian Griselda Pollock and film theorist Julian Albilla worked with Bracha L. Ettinger's concepts of matrixial gaze, eros, and witnessing to analyse the feminine gaze in the films of Chantal Akerman and Pedro Almodóvar.

At the 2016 Toronto International Film Festival, Joey Soloway, in their keynote address, explored the definition of the female gaze in film-making. Specifically, Soloway outlined three concepts, mimicking Laura Mulvey's original triangulation of the male gaze (the spectator, the filmmaker, and the actors). Soloway's conception of the female gaze goes beyond a mere inversion of Mulvey's male gaze, however, and instead imagines the ways in which the female gaze in filmmaking can provide insight into the lived female experience. Their concept includes "the feeling camera" (or "bodies over equipment" wherein emotions are prioritized over action); "the gazed gaze," which shows viewers how it feels to be the object of the gaze; and "returning the gaze" (or "I see you seeing me" and "how it feels to stand here in this world having been seen our entire lives").

Similarly, 'written by a woman' is a phrase popularized on TikTok typically referring to men who are portrayed as emotionally vulnerable and aware as well as rejecting conventions of toxic masculinity. Some often cited examples include Laurie, played by Timothée Chalamet, in Little Women or Harry Styles. 'Written by a woman' serves as a reaction to the male gaze, occasionally manifesting itself to satirize its logical antonym— 'written by a man—' via hyperbolic displays of female oversexualization. However, it is important to distinguish 'written by a woman' with female-written, as works authored by women are not invulnerable to patriarchal and anti-feminist displays of affection or adoration, given (according to Mulvey) the internalized influence of the male gaze and patriarchal perspective on many women's self-reflections and identity.

== Application in film and media ==
American writer and director Joey Soloway has addressed additional components of the female gaze in film and media. In their 2016 Toronto International Film Festival Masterclass, Soloway outlined three key concepts in their theory of the female gaze: "feeling seeing," "the gazed gaze," and "returning the gaze." These three key concepts can be easily contrasted with the three looks of Laura Mulvey's Gaze. In film and media, 'feeling seeing' refers to a process of filmmaking that makes the camera subjective. The 'gazed gaze' creates the perspective of being "in" rather than overlooking the character's experiences, allowing the audience to understand the character's inner thoughts, feelings, and emotions. The television show Fleabag utilizes this trope through direct eye contact with the camera lens. In Fleabag, written and directed by Phoebe-Waller Bridge, the unnamed protagonist breaks the Fourth wall during moments when she is not revealing the full extent of her beliefs or emotions to other characters within the show, instead relaying her inner thoughts, feelings, and emotions to the audience through eye contact directly in the camera lens – as Markus Kügle already explained in more detail.

The 'gazed gaze' refers to a connection with the audience, aimed at conveying the ideal conceptions of being desired and as the object of one's affection. The 2005 film adaptation of Pride and Prejudice, directed by Joe Wright, displays this concept during a scene in which the protagonist, Mr. Darcy, admits timidly with hesitance to Elizabeth Bennet his captivation and affection for her in a manner that is contrary to the grandeur professions of love seen in the romance genre. During his declaration of love, the camera's angle makes the viewer appear as the subject of Mr. Darcy's love confession. The direct camera angle allows the audience to know what it may feel like to be the object of his gaze.

To address the rise of rejecting and returning the gaze in film and media Joey Soloway conceptualized 'returning the gaze,' this refers to switching the roles between the audience and the subject of objectification within the film. The gaze is shared between the objectified and objectified through which the character realizes their role, rejecting it or returning to the viewer. Depicted in writer and director Greta Gerwig's Barbie, the film follows Margot Robbie's Barbie as she becomes sentient, leaving Barbieland to go to the 'real world,' where she experiences for the first time the patriarchy and sexual objectification. In the film, Margot Robbie's Barbie realizes the full extent of what it means to be seen as an object and the implications of living in a patriarchal society, something absent in the utopia of Barbieland. During a scene when Barbie is crying after realizing the full extent of what it means to live in a patriarchal world, the narrator breaks the fourth wall by addressing how, during this scene of vulnerability and defeat experienced by Barbie, the audience instead readily acknowledges how beautiful Margot Robbie looks while crying before they will recognize her character's feelings. Rejecting, or similarly recognizing, the audience will acknowledge her beauty before empathizing with her struggles as a woman through the verbal assertion made by the film's narrator.

== Criticisms ==
Like the male gaze, the female gaze is not without its detractors. In an article for Film Quarterly entitled No Such Thing Not Yet: Questioning Television Female Gaze, Caetlin Benson-Allot discussed the lack of representation of minorities in the female gaze. She argues that although the female gaze presumes a universal experience based on shared gender, it tends to ignore minorities, choosing instead to focus on the lives of white middle-class women. In the article she specifically focuses on television. In it she uses examples from the TV shows I Love Dick, GLOW and Insecure. She argues that although I Love Dick and GLOW introduce characters of color, they do so by casting them in supporting roles which never destabilize the white protagonist. Insecure on the other hand, she argues, provides a model for future feminist television. The show follows Issa and her friend Molly and focuses on the self-defeating impulses in their personal and professional relationships. The story line also focuses on Issa's job working with at-risk youth, which helps in exploring the racial dynamics of Los Angeles. Using anti-racist comedy, Benson-Allot argued, Insecure challenged the focus on white feminism and neglect of black women.

Canadian cinematographer Zoe Dirse also criticized the reproduction of the female gaze and the under-representation of women in technical areas of film making. Using her experience in the documentary genre, she focused on the female gaze at the point of production. Dirse focused on the dominance of the white middle class male in the film industry. According to her, women are often shut out of the film industry due to its profitable nature. This creates a lack of women producing for the female viewer or reproducing the female gaze. She uses examples of excerpts from films to explore the need for female directors and technical crew in properly reproducing the female gaze. One example she gives is that of the 1992 documentary Forbidden Love, which focuses on the stories of lesbians coming out in the 1950s. According to Dirse, in this film the feminist, lesbian directors managed to subvert the male gaze in favor of the female one; creating a view in which the actors are not objects of male desire, but of female desire. She argues that when there are feminist filmmakers, the film creates feminist elements. She argues that it is crucial for women to take control of their art in order to accurately reproduce the female gaze.

In Chick Flicks and the Straight Female Gaze, Natalie Perfetti-Oates argued that the heterosexual female gaze can become problematic with the rise of male sexual objectification. This is due to the use of sex negativity when enacting this gaze. Sex negativity occurs when men are trapped as solely sex objects. Chick flicks that cast their male leads solely as sex objects for the female viewers, according to Perfetti-Oates, serve to reverse gender discrimination rather than creating gender equality. Oates explains how more and more action movies and chick flick films create the heterosexual female gaze through showcasing male's bodies. In her article, Oates used examples from films such as Forgetting Sarah Marshall, New Moon, and Magic Mike. In Magic Mike, for example, Mike only becomes a love interest after he quits his job as a stripper, thus making Mike a sex object and love interest, but not both, thus creating sex negativity. She argued that progress towards equality will be made when both men and women can move freely between the position of subject and object; not when men are objectified just as women have been.

In Jessica Taylor's Romance and the Female Gaze: Obscuring Gendered Violence in the Twilight Saga, Taylor criticizes the emerging female gaze and how it interacts with romance to portray violent male bodies as desirable. She describes the Twilight series as retrograde and naïve in its use of romance conventions. To explain how the female gaze works to create violent male bodies as desirable, she looked back on the work of Mulvey. Specifically, she focused on the notion of "fetishistic scopophilia" that was previously used by Mulvey to explain how the anxiety-inducing female body becomes fetishized and a source of pleasure for the male viewer, leading female viewers towards hyper-desirability gaze of the bodies of the male characters, and pushing the female audience to desire the powerful, violent male body rather than fear it. Examples that she gives are the way in which the body of both Jacob and Edward are manipulated by categorizing them as visually desirable boys.

It reduces the threat of violence and neutralizes the potential threats to the female viewers. Taylor argues that the use of a limited and specific female gaze can re-code incidents of gendered violence and violent male body as both reassuring and desirable.

Joey Soloway's three main concepts of the 'female gaze' in film rely heavily on the emotional environment created by the director. The underrepresentation of women behind the camera in film and television limits the application of her main principles of the 'female gaze.' This gaze is implemented less in terms of the narrative outcomes or the final product; instead, it depends on how it is produced and curated, often by the director and cinematographer. As discussed in Laura Mulvey's essay "Visual Pleasure and Narrative Cinema," within the film and media sphere, men make up the majority of directors, cinematographers, and camera crew, limiting the aspects in which the female gaze gets produced," the underrepresentation of the female perspective on screen is tied to the female underrepresentation in the film industry overall. The female gaze as an applied practice in film is bound to the opportunity and gender disparities in the film industry for women. Recognizing this is connected to understanding the reason for its limited presence in film and media.

== See also ==
- Gendered dating norms
- List of LGBT films directed by women
- List of lesbian filmmakers
- Otome game
- Queer gaze
- Sex differences in empathy
