= Zoe Dirse =

Canadian cinematographer and film director

- Education: University of Toronto York University
- Occupation(s): Cinematographer; Director; Writer; Professor
- Years active: 1979–present

Zoe Dirse is a Canadian cinematographer, film director, writer and professor. She is best known for her cinematography work for Studio D under the National Film Board of Canada, the first government-funded film studio in the world dedicated to women filmmakers.

== Career ==
Before her work in film and television, Dirse earned a degree in psychology and teaching at the University of Toronto. While in university, she took some theoretical film courses and fell in love with French New Wave cinema. When she began her career in the film industry in 1979, she was one of only two female camera assistants in IATSE 644. Her first “break” in her career began when she was called to work by producer Christa Singer on the documentary Adoption Stories for TVOntario. Brought in as an assistant, Dirse was hired to help the teenage subjects of the documentary feel “less threatened” by having her behind the camera. After shooting Adoption Stories, Dirse began working on commercial shoots as well as second-unit and second-assistant jobs on numerous Hollywood and television projects. Upon looking for more varied work, Dirse sought to work on films that involved social change, ultimately leading her to the National Film Board of Canada, where she worked from 1982 until 1997.

While working at the National Film Board of Canada, Dirse worked on over 70 film projects, including a number of groundbreaking documentaries produced by Studio D including: Wisecracks (1992); Forbidden Love: the Unashamed Stories of Lesbian Lives (1992); and Jane Rule: Fiction and Other Truths (1996). As the camera department closed at the NFB in 1997, Dirse moved to Toronto to start her own company titled Zoe Dirse Productions. While developing documentaries, features, and movies for television, Dirse pursued a master's degree in Fine Arts degree at York University. During her time at York, a lecture she gave at a conference in 2003 resulted in her theory of the female gaze in film being published in Women Filmmakers: Refocusing.

Since 2000, Dirse has taught cinematography and documentary at Sheridan College in Oakville, Ontario. She currently holds a position on the board of directors for the Canadian Society of Cinematographers.

== Female gaze ==
Dirse looks at the female gaze through her cinematography work in the documentary film genre, analyzing aspects of pleasure and viewer identification. She analyzes the gaze at the points of production (not reception), and "perception" being where sexual difference happens. She notes that if "the bearer of the look is female, the subject is female, and the subject subverts the gaze and gazes at herself". Dirse argues that having a female cinematographer alters the experience for both female and male subjects, and the perception of the film changes, citing her experiences of being shoved while filming in a crowd of men, and going by nearly unnoticed when filming intimate moments between women. She concludes that the female gaze is necessary in all forms of art, as it is mostly absent from dominant culture.

== Praise and criticism ==
Dirse was awarded in 2018 by Women In Film & Television Toronto (WIFT) with the Mentorship Award, due to her "collaborative spirit" and willingness to guide first-time directors. Longtime collaborator Lynne Fernie praised Dirse for having “an incredible gift for relating to the people she's filming so that they are relaxed and open when the camera is rolling... When we were shooting the interviews for Forbidden Love, she not only lit the women beautifully, she enjoyed meeting and talking to each woman. So when the lights turned on and the camera began to roll - we were shooting in 16mm - our subjects were very comfortable talking about sexuality and telling difficult stories about their lives even while surrounded by all of this technology and our crew.”

== Awards and honours ==
- Rogers-DOC Luminary Award, 2018
- WIFT Mentorship Award, 2018

== Selected filmography ==
Year	Film	Role	Notes
1981	Circle of Two	Second assistant camera	
1983	Flamenco at 5:15	Assistant Camera	Won at the 56th Academy Awards for Documentary Short Subject.
1984	Margaret Atwood: Once in August	Cinematographer	
1986	Firewords, Part 1-3	Cinematographer	
1988	A Song for Quebec	Cinematographer	
1990	The Burning Times	Additional/assistant camera	
1991	Sisters in the Struggle	Cinematographer	
1992	Wisecracks	Cinematographer	
1992	Forbidden Love: The Unashamed Stories of Lesbian Lives	Cinematographer	Won at the 14th Genie Awards for Feature Length Documentary. Won the GLAAD Media Award for Outstanding Film (Documentary)
1993	Kanehsatake: 270 Years of Resistance	Cinematographer	Won the Silver Sesterce at Visions du Réel festival in 1993, a Special Jury Award given to a cinematographic work. Won Best Canadian Film at the 1993 Toronto International Film Festival.
1993	Long Time Comin'	Cinematographer	
1993	Baltic Fire	Director; Cinematographer	Dirse's directorial debut
1994	Motherland: Tales of Wonder	Cinematographer	
1996	A Balkan Journey: Fragments from the Other Side of War	Cinematographer	
1997	Erotica: A Journey Into Female Sexuality	Cinematographer	
1998	Shadow Maker: Gwendolyn MacEwen, Poet	Cinematographer	
2004	Madame President	Director; Cinematographer; Writer	
2010	Sisters in Arms	Cinematographer	
