= First Wave (TV series) =

1998–2001 Canadian television show

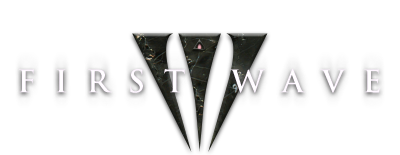
- Genre: Science fiction; Alien invasion; Action; Adventure
- Created by: Chris Brancato
- Starring: Sebastian Spence; Rob LaBelle; Roger Cross; Traci Lords
- Composers: Daryl Bennett; Jim Guttridge ("Hypnotic"); Claude Foisy; The Collison Brothers (season three)
- Country of origin: Canada
- Original language: English
- No. of seasons: 3
- No. of episodes: 66 (list of episodes)

Production
- Executive producers: Francis Ford Coppola; Larry Sugar
- Production location: Vancouver Canada
- Cinematography: Henry Chan
- Running time: 44 minutes
- Production companies: First Wave Productions; American Zoetrope; Peace Arch Entertainment (Note: Known as Vidatron from seasons 1–2.); Pearson Television International

Original release
- Network: Space; Sci-Fi Channel
- Release: September 9, 1998 – February 7, 2001

First Wave is a Canadian science fiction drama television series, filmed in Vancouver, that aired from 1998 to 2001 on the Space Channel in Canada. The show was created and written by American screenwriter Chris Brancato. Francis Ford Coppola was executive producer on the show. In an unusual move, the Sci-Fi Channel, which picked up the show in late 1998, later expanded their pickup of the series to a 66-episode order. The show was subsequently cancelled once the 66-episode order was filled at the end of the third season due to disappointing ratings.

== Plot ==
Former thief turned security specialist Kincaid Lawrence "Cade" Foster's life was idyllic, with a beautiful wife, good job and a nice house. Unbeknownst to him, a race of extraterrestrials called the Gua have identified him as subject 117 in an Alien experiment - AHX2323 - to test human will. As part of this experiment, his life is systematically ruined, including the murder of his wife, for which he is framed. He is the only one of the 117 subjects to solve the riddles of the experiment and escape arrest to live as a fugitive. The Gua are among humans in the form of hybridised genetic clones and plan to enslave humanity—the first of three "waves" intent on conquering and finally destroying the human race. Constantly pursued by the police, and a strange government agency called the Illuminati, Foster discovers previously unknown quatrains of Nostradamus, which tell of three waves that will destroy the planet unless the "twice-blessed man" can stop them. For this reason, Foster investigates strange occurrences that may have ties to the Nostradamus quatrains, hoping to find what he needs to stop the Gua.

"Crazy" Eddie Nambulous is a computer hacker who helps Cade Foster and works on a web tabloid Paranoid Times. He uses Cade's journal to tell people that the "aliens are here, walking among us, laying the groundwork for an impending invasion." After scanning the prophecies of Nostradamus into his computer, he analyzes and cross-references the quatrains with bizarre current events to which they may be connected. Foster and Eddie use these quatrains to understand the Gua invasion and search for any and all tools that may aid them in stopping the invasion in its First Wave.

One of the Gua, Joshua, does not believe the invasion of Earth is necessary. Although he wants the best for his people, he helps Cade and Eddie stop his people from initiating the "Second Wave" — the invasion itself, in which 19 million people will die.

=== History of the Gua ===
We were like you once. There's a time for peace and inner-growth, but we became complacent; and when the invasion force landed, they took us down. One rebel led us to freedom. That's when we took the name Gua; it means "power to overcome". Over the centuries, science and industry achieved perfect focus. We created a military machine to ensure our freedom, permanently... We're here because we'll never be victims again."

— Joshua Bridges, season 1 episode 09, "Joshua"

The Gua are a race older than humanity, coming from a much older star system. As Joshua tells Cade, "Everything on my planet is red, the colour of a tired sun; the colour of death" which indicates that their home system is at a much later stage than our own, and that their sun is entering a late phase of its life. The Gua originally existed peacefully, exploring their inner selves until they were invaded and enslaved. Eventually, they rose up and overthrew their oppressors, taking the name Gua from that climactic, defining event; Gua meaning "power to overcome".

As a consequence of this invasion, the newly named Gua decided they could no longer afford to be passive and peaceful, and set out on an aggressive, expansionist path. Aware of the limited lifespan of their home planet, they began a campaign to expand into other systems. Thus their invasion of Earth was planned.

Due to the distance between Earth and their own planet, the Gua devised a method of dispatching small metallic orbs containing their consciousnesses through wormholes to Earth and transferring them into specially bioengineered human husks. As a result of this, it is unknown what the Gua actually look like.

These husks contain small amounts of Gua DNA that provide the aliens with an increased rate of healing, strength, speed and intelligence. The husks dissolve and disappear completely when the aliens are killed. The aliens in these husks are tasked with preparing the planet for the Second Wave. While being held hostage by Cade, Joshua noted that he was in his "third body"; this is further elaborated when Joshua states that the average Gua life-span is "equal to 1,000 human years".

In the third season, Joshua reveals that at least one other race had been conquered and exterminated by the Gua centuries prior. Apparently, some members of that race had precognitive abilities; it is revealed that the being later known as Nostradamus was a member of this race. He journeyed to Earth and used his precognitive abilities to leave behind the prophesies that would help Cade resist the Gua.

It has been established that the Gua communicate telepathically and have sensory abilities far more advanced than a human. This is due largely to the fact that from birth the Gua undergo a continuous metamorphosis, making the issue of identifying one individual Gua from another impossible. As a result, they have developed a sophisticated array of senses that can be used to rightfully identify other Gua. It has also been established that a Gua can at least sense the presence of another Gua from a distance without making contact.

The Gua have on numerous occasions demonstrated a very totalitarian culture and nature that limits their empathic abilities. Their sexual nature is one where intercourse is severely painful and partners are chosen out of genetic capabilities. Their culture is based on racial unity, where society is superior and individuals have no value. Several Gua have experienced guilt and even rebelled after realizing the horror they have committed on themselves and other races. As a result, many of them have been killed by their own as traitors.

Throughout the entire series, the Gua's most important weakness has been their lack of will, making them vulnerable when cornered or in emotional distress. They also proved (in human host form, at least) to have a weakness to salt – it affects them like a drug, rendering them "blissed out' and may lead to addiction.

In episode 41 (Season 2, episode 19),"The Trial of Joshua Bridges", Joshua confirms his fury towards the totalitarian and despotic nature of the Gua, accusing their leaders of reducing the Gua to "primitive butchers".

== Cast ==
- Sebastian Spence as Cade Foster
- Rob LaBelle as Larry Pisinski a.k.a. "Crazy" Eddie Nambulous
- Roger Cross as Joshua/Cain
- Traci Lords as Jordan Radcliffe (season three)

== Crew ==
- Mike Rohl
- Holly Dale (6 episodes, 1999–2000)
- Brenton Spencer (4 episodes, 1998)
- Ken Girotti (4 episodes, 2000–2001)
- Shawn Levy (2 episodes, 1998–1999)
- Bill Corcoran (2 episodes, 2000–2001)
- Rob LaBelle (2 episodes, 2000)
- Randy Cheveldave
- Graeme Lynch
- George Mendeluk
- Larry Sugar
- Daniel Cerone (11 episodes, 1998–2000)
- William T. Conway (3 episodes, 2000–2001)
- Dan E. Fesman (2 episodes, 1998–1999)
- Harry Victor (2 episodes, 1998–1999)
- Chris Brancato
- Michael J. Cinquemani
- Paul Brown
- Fergus Cook
- Michael Robison
- Andrea Stevens
- Michael Thoma
- David Wilcox

== Episodes ==
Season	Episodes	Originally released	
Season	Episodes	First released	Last released
1	22	September 9, 1998	June 30, 1999
2	22	September 22, 1999	June 14, 2000
3	22	September 13, 2000	February 7, 2001

== Production ==
Chris Brancato created the series to be a mixture of The X-Files and The Fugitive but with the added element of eroticism seen in Species (with Brancato having written Species II) with the aliens in the series being able to exploit humans through sexual attraction as the husks they've designed are modeled off of beauty standards in media such as Baywatch. While Francis Ford Coppola served as an executive producer on the series, his actual involvement with the series was minimal but did help secure financing for the series that would otherwise not have been attainable.

=== Effects ===
Steve Johnson was hired as the series' special effects supervisor upon Brancato's recommendation to the producers as he was impressed with Johnson's work on Species II, particularly the translucent and attractive designs of the aliens.

== Broadcast ==
First Wave originally began airing on the Space Channel in Canada, premiering in September 1998. It also premiered in other foreign markets in 1998. While originally designed for first-run syndication market in the United States, the series was ultimately picked up by the Sci-Fi Channel in December 1998 for a March 1999 premiere on the network. Sci-Fi Channel later increased their order for the series to 66 episodes (three seasons) in early 1999.

== Home media ==
On May 17, 2011, Alliance Home Entertainment released season 1 on DVD in Region 1 (North America).

DVD name	Ep#	Release dates
Season 1: 1998-1999	22	May 17, 2011

== Other media ==
First Wave: Subject 117 is a novel by Chris Brancato and Karen Holmes aimed at younger readers, and published in June 2000.

A series of comic books were published by Andromeda Entertainment. Six issues were published between 2000 and 2001, encompassing four storylines and each issue was released with two alternate covers: a painted one by Matt Busch or one featuring a photo of the cast.

- Heart of A Killer (2 issues), written by James Anthony Kuhoric with art by Dan Parsons — Cade Foster poses as a reporter and goes to Rikers Island to talk to a prisoner who might be an alien.
- Jordan Radcliffe (1 issue), written by James Anthony Kuhoric with art by Dan Parsons — Ties into Raven Nation, the second episode of the third season.
- In The Beginning (1 issue), written by James Anthony Kuhoric with art by Michael Malbrough — A prequel story that reveals how Cade Foster was chosen for their experiment by the Gua.
- Double Vision (2 issues), written by James Anthony Kuhoric with art by Dan Parsons — The Second Wave occurs as Cade Foster and Jordan Radcliffe struggle to stop it.

== See also ==
The Invaders - a 1960s science fiction TV series from the producers of The Fugitive with a similar premise.
