= Shadowmaker =

Shadowmaker may refer to:

- Shadowmaker (Running Wild album), 2012
- Shadowmaker (Apocalyptica album), 2015

== See also ==
- Shadow Maker: Gwendolyn MacEwen, Poet, a Canadian short documentary film
