= Janis Cole =

Canadian filmmaker and professor (born 1954)

- Born: 1954 (age 71–72)
- Occupation: Film director
- Notable work: Cream Soda (1976); P4W: Prison for Women (1981); Hookers on Davie (1984)

Janis Cole (born 1954) is a Canadian filmmaker, producer, screenwriter, editor, and academic. She has directed several films over the span of her career. Most of these films were done in cooperation with her friend and professional partner, Holly Dale, with whom she founded Spectrum Films. Her most notable films include Cream Soda (1976) and P4W: Prison for Women (1981).

== Early life ==
Janis Cole was born in 1954.

== Career ==
=== Early career ===
Cole has had a long career, beginning with her time in school where she made short films with Dale. Their first, a short documentary called Cream Soda (1976), took a look at sex trade workers in the city of Toronto, Ontario. The film focuses on the body rub industry, while highlighting tricks of the trade as explained by the workers. Their next two films Thin Line (1977) and Minimum Charge No Cover (1976), which are documentaries as well, explored new ideas. The former takes a look into the maximum security mental health centre at Penetanguishene, Ontario, where Cole and Dale interviewed and photographed the inmates. The film is a serious take on crime, and the compassion one can feel towards such hardened criminals. Minimum Charge No Cover, again deals with the sex industry in Toronto. The film follows several subjects, from all walks of life, including a transsexual, homosexuals, hookers, transvestites, and female impersonators. These early films paved the way for Janis' career as a documentarian and filmmaker, focused on feminist and female themes.

=== First feature film ===
Cole and Dale's first feature film, P4W: Prison for Women (1981), won the duo a Genie Award for Best Theatrical Documentary and is considered the most well known film of Cole's career. P4W follows the lives of inmates in Canada's only female prison at the time. The film focuses less on the crimes that have been committed and more on their stories, relationships, and isolation in the Kingston, Ontario penitentiary. The film centres on five women, which is only a small focus compared to the number of women who wanted to be involved in the film.

"There were about 100 inmates. We met with them maybe half a dozen times before we started to shoot. We really got to know a lot of the inmates, and we researched their crimes very well. There were about sixty women who wanted to be in the film; we narrowed the list to half a dozen people that we really wanted to focus on," said Cole in an interview for the book, The View from Here: Conversations with Gay and Lesbian Filmmakers by Matthew Hays.

This feature film was important in the acceptance of lesbian relationships in film, especially documentary. The lack of men present in this film made the idea more believable, helping audiences to accept the love between two female inmates shown on screen.

=== Later works ===
After P4W came Hookers on Davie (1984, 86), which followed street prostitution, this time located in Vancouver. This film was well received, helping the pair to a second Genie Award.

Cole continued her work in the industry, making films such as Calling the Shots (1988) and Bowie: One in a Million (2001).

Calling the Shots (1988), is a documentary that sees Cole and Dale interviewing and recording women who work within the feature film business, reflecting on their time and trials over their careers.

Bowie: One in a Million (2001), Cole's final piece, is a portrait of the life of Cathy Bowie, who was murdered by her husband George Jackson. After her life became a headline, Bowie faded into a statistic. This 10-minute short was a tribute to Bowie, who herself was a friend of Cole's.

=== Academia ===
Cole worked as a professor at OCAD University in Toronto for 30 years and is now professor emerita.

== Spectrum Films ==
Dale and Cole decided to develop and operate the Toronto-based independent production company called Spectrum Films in the early 1980s. They registered the name as a partnership but when they tried to incorporate the company in the late 1980s, discovered that the name had already been used for another company. They therefore incorporated it as Spectrum-One Films Inc. Spectrum Films produced independent films of various lengths and genres, including Hookers on Davie; Calling the shots; P4W : prison for women; Blood & donuts; Thin line; The making of Agnes of God; and Dangerous offender. The company won a number of awards, including the 1988 Theatrical Producers Achievement Award and the 1994 Toronto Arts Award. It folded sometime between 2002 and 2026.

== Filmography ==
Year	Films (Directed)	Notes
1976	Cream Soda	
1976	Minimum Charge No Cover	
1977	Thin Line	
1981	P4W: Prison for Women	
1984	Hookers on Davie	
1985	Quiet on the Set: Filming Agnes of God (also known as: "The Making of Agnes of God")	
1988	Calling the Shots	
1990	Shaggie: Letters from Prison	segment of movie Five Feminist Minutes
2001	Bowie: One in a Million	

== See also ==
- List of female film and television directors
- List of lesbian filmmakers
- List of LGBT-related films directed by women
