= Queer gaze =

LGBTQ-related film theory term

Queer gaze is a term used in film and media that describes an interpretive perspective in visual arts and criticism that centers on the perspectives of LGBTQ+ people.

== Background ==
It builds on earlier concepts like the male gaze and female gaze. Gaze theory analyzes the relationships between the observer and the observed. Eliza McDonough argues this is disrupting the male gaze. This gaze builds upon the earlier gazes by moving beyond and changing the view perspective, which increases media representation while including previously marginalized groups.

== Etymology ==
Usage of this term dates back to at least 2003 when it was used in the title of a thesis The Queer Gaze by Tim Wray.

== See also ==
- Male gaze
- Female gaze
- Queer theory
- Queerbaiting
- Queer coding
