= List of First Wave episodes =

First Wave is a Canadian science fiction drama television series created by Chris Brancato, with Francis Ford Coppola as the show's executive producer. It originally aired on the Space Channel. Filmed in Vancouver, British Columbia, Canada, the series focuses on the struggles of Cade Foster (Sebastian Spence) who almost single-handedly attempts to resist a secret alien invasion. The show was subsequently picked up by the Sci-Fi Channel in the United States which then, in an unusual move, expanded their pickup of the series to a 66-episode order. It premiered on September 9, 1998, and ended on February 7, 2001, with a total of 66 episodes over the course of 3 seasons.

== Series overview ==
Season	Episodes	Originally released	
Season	Episodes	First released	Last released
1	22	September 9, 1998	June 30, 1999
2	22	September 22, 1999	June 14, 2000
3	22	September 13, 2000	February 7, 2001

== Episodes ==
=== Season 1 (1998–1999) ===
No. overall	No. in season	Title	Directed by	Written by	Original release date
1	1	"Subject 117"	Brenton Spencer	Chris Brancato	September 9, 1998
Cade Foster has an idyllic life, but as of late he has been plagued by nightmares. Soon his life turns upside down, with his job gone, his credit cards no longer working, and his wife terrified, and then things get even worse..,
2	2	"Crazy Eddie"	Jorge Montesi	Story by : Chris Brancato & Paul Eckstein; Teleplay by : Chris Brancato	September 16, 1998
On the run from the authorities, Cade seeks aid from a conspiracy theorist named Crazy Eddie.
3	3	"Mata Hari"	Brenton Spencer	Scott Smith Miller	September 23, 1998
After a grad student dies of decompression sickness on dry land, Cade takes his place and investigates the woman who apparently killed him with only a look. Guest starring Heather Hanson, Sarah Strange, and Richard Newman.
4	4	"Hypnotic"	René Bonnière	Paul Brown	September 30, 1998
Cade suspects a member of a hypnotic therapy group is a Gua.
5	5	"Elixir"	Brenton Spencer	Chris Brancato	October 7, 1998
Cade discovers the Gua are selling an elixir with properties that resemble the Fountain of Youth to the elderly, and he investigates to discover their plan.
6	6	"Speaking in Tongues"	Graeme Kynch	Jeff King	October 14, 1998
Cade investigates a messianic cult leader who appears to have supernatural power warning people of a coming invasion. Guest starring Tara Spencer-Nairn.
7	7	"Lungfish"	Brenton Spencer	Daniel Cerone	October 21, 1998
After a young boy named Cody discovers a bass that can breathe on land, Cade investigates and the two discover the Gua are using a nearby fish breeding farm to perform experiments that make humans breathe underwater, and one of the test subjects is Cody’s sister. Cade must rescue the test subjects and evade Colonel Grace’s dragnet, all while stopping the Gua’s plan. Guest starring Emmanuelle Vaugier and Lorena Gale. NOTE: Final appearance of Colonel Grace.
8	8	"Book of Shadows"	Michael Robison	Story by : Daniel Cerone; Teleplay by : Dan E. Fesman & Harry Victor	October 28, 1998
In Salem, Massachusetts, high schooler Diana (Camille Sullivan) murders several important figures, and claims that they were actually demons. Cade investigates and discovers she was actually killing Gua.
9	9	"Joshua"	Jorge Montesi	Story by : Daniel Cerone & Paul Eckstein; Teleplay by : Daniel Cerone	November 4, 1998
On the run in the Montana wilderness, Cade flees from both the local police and Joshua.
10	10	"Marker 262"	Shawn Levy	Chris Brancato	November 11, 1998
Cade and Eddie investigate the disappearance of several motorists. Guest starring Kavan Smith, Ingrid Kavelaars, and Brennan Elliott.
11	11	"Motel California"	Gilbert Shilton	Jean Gennis & Phyllis Murphy	November 18, 1998
Cade investigates a motel that is a Gua psychological experiment that drives its patrons mad, only to be trapped inside the motel himself.
12	12	"Breeding Ground"	Mike Rohl	Story by : Albert J. Salke & Adam Grossman; Teleplay by : Adam Grossman	November 25, 1998
An orphaned teenage girl is injected with Gua DNA, and Cade must rescue her before the Gua use her as a weapon.
13	13	"Blue Agave"	Brad Turner	Louis Venosta	December 2, 1998
The Gua are using a night club attended by the rich and powerful to replace the patrons with clones. Guest starring Rachel Hayward.
14	14	"Cul-De-Sac"	Tibor Takacs	Bruce Zimmerman	December 9, 1998
A teenager witnesses a double murder, but is disbelieved when one of the murder victims gets back up unharmed. The teenager emails Crazy Eddie, and Cade promptly goes to investigate, and uncovers a Gua plot. Guest starring Brandy Letford and Fred Henderson.
15	15	"The Box"	George Mendeluk	Chris Brancato	December 16, 1998
After being captured by the police, Cade discovers that one of the officers interrogating him is a Gua - and his wife’s killer. Guest starring Aaron Pearl and John Novak.
16	16	"Undesirables"	René Bonnière	Daniel Cerone	December 23, 1998
Joshua is sent to eliminate a Gua human sympathizer. Guest starring Robert Wisden and Steve Bacic.
17	17	"Second Wave"	Gilbert Shilton	Chris Brancato & David Wilcox	December 30, 1998
Cade finds himself at ground zero of the Second Wave... or has he? Guest starring Garry Chalk and Kathryn Anderson.
18	18	"Blind Witness"	Holly Dale	Daniel Cerone	January 6, 1999
After discovering Nostradamus prophesied about an ally who can actually see the Gua for what they are, Cade investigates and finds himself at a hospital where a blind woman has regained her sight as a result of Gua experiments, and is now able to tell between humans and Gua. However, with the entire hospital staff composed of Gua, Cade must escape with the blind woman before the Gua catch in and kill her. Guest starring Adrian Holmes.
19	19	"Deluge"	Randy Cheveldave	Joe Inglese	January 13, 1999
Cade arrives at a small lumber town where the rain has not stopped for three years as part of a Gua psychological experiment, resulting in the townspeople forming a cult that sacrifices people in an effort to stop the rain, and Cade is to be their next sacrifice. Guest starring Zachary Ansley and Kevin McNulty.
20	20	"Melody"	Jorge Montesi	Daniel Cerone	January 20, 1999
After a violent riot at a rock concert, Cade and Eddie investigate and discover that the rock band playing at the concert’s music has a subliminal frequency that causes the listener to break out into violent frenzies. Guest starring Tyler Labine and Jennifer Copping.
21	21	"The Aftertime"	Mark Sobel	Theresa Rebeck	June 23, 1999
While attempting to retrieve a Gua message from a HAM radio, Cade is taken to the future by a time traveler who claims that Cade is to lead the remnants of humanity in a final battle against the Gua.
22	22	"The Decision"	Larry Sugar	Chris Brancato	June 30, 1999
Clip show: The Gua council debate with Joshua about beginning the Second Wave.

=== Season 2 (1999–2000) ===
No. overall	No. in season	Title	Directed by	Written by	Original release date
23	1	"Target 117"	Jorge Montesi	Chris Brancato	September 22, 1999
After Cade is lured into a trap and stranded on an island, he must battle Joshua’s protege, who is inhabiting a husk that is a hybrid of Gua and human DNA. Guest starring Rena Mero.
24	2	"Deepthroat"	Mike Rohl	Daniel Cerone	September 29, 1999
An astronomer friend of Eddie’s is killed for having a photo that proves the Gua’s invasion, but he has sent a copy to a US Senator. Cade contacts the Senator, who denies receiving it, but an investigative reporter begins investigating after seeing their meeting. Guest starring Stefanie von Pfetten.
25	3	"The Apostles"	Jorge Montesi	Chris Brancato & Albert J. Salke	October 6, 1999
Cade discovers a vigilante biker gang called the Apostles who, inspired by Cade, have gone on a crusade of murdering Gua. Cade is ecstatic in spite of Eddie’s warnings, but he soon discovers that the Apostles’ methods endanger innocent people.
26	4	"Susperience"	Michael Rohl	David Wilcox	October 13, 1999
Following the Quatrains, Cade is led to a group of Empaths with the ability to influence the thoughts of others. Whilst investigating he begins to realize the group is under the covert control of a murderous alien.
27	5	"The Channel"	Jorge Montesi	Daniel Cerone	October 20, 1999
After nearly dying in a hit-and-run accident, a woman (Sarah Chalke) begins spouting prophecies from the Quatrains whenever she sees bright lights. Cade sneaks into her home, and upon seeing him, she is possessed by Nostradamus’s spirit.
28	6	"Red Flag"	Michael Robison	Michael Thoma	October 27, 1999
Cade infiltrates an army base holding a coveted military training exercise ("Red Flag") designed to groom future leaders, suspecting the Gua plan to use it to replace candidates with clones and put them in positions of power.
29	7	"Prayer for the White Man"	Jorge Montesi	Chris Brancato & Paul Eckstein	November 3, 1999
Cade suspects an alien influence while investigating a casino on a Native American Reservation.
30	8	"The Purge"	Michael Robison	Chris Brancato & Albert J. Salke	November 10, 1999
It seems that treachery is afoot amongst the acolytes on earth, as Joshua is enlisted to ferret out traitors. Note: The main characters Kincaid "Cade" Foster and Crazy Eddie do not appear in this episode at all.
31	9	"Lost Souls"	George Mendeluk	Daniel Cerone	November 17, 1999
Subway workers find the body of a woman buried 50 years ago in a wall - impossibly she is still alive. A Nostrodamus prophecy predicted this so Foster investigates how it could happen and if the GUA are responsible.
32	10	"The Heist"	Holly Dale	Paul Eckstein	November 24, 1999
Cade is hired to steal an item. However, it soon becomes a fight for life and death.
33	11	"Ohio Players"	George Mendeluk	Dan E. Fesman & Harry Victor	December 1, 1999
An amazing turnaround in a high-school football team's fortunes raises Cade's eyebrows and causes him to investigate why the team players all have the same tattoo on their arms. Visiting the tattoo parlor he finds the ink is not as expected. The patron who runs the parlor tries to kill him, and once again Cade is saved by his friend Eddie.
34	12	"Night Falls"	Holly Dale	Michael Thoma	December 8, 1999
While investigating a clue Cade gets shot in the side by the police. He hijacks a car and forces the driver to take him home with her. The aliens try and trick him into revealing the location of the Nostradamus book he had hidden.
35	13	"Normal, Illinois"	Stein Myhrstad	Peter Elkoff	December 15, 1999
Cade is called in to investigate the sudden deaths of healthy teens in the town of Normal, IL. It appears all the kids died in the throes of passion.
36	14	"All About Eddie"	Michael Rohl	Chris Brancato & Albert J. Salke	December 22, 1999
Eddie takes on the aliens at his high-school reunion when he discovers his friends are being kidnapped by the Gua. The aliens plot to kidnap and torture Eddie, determined to press their victim until he reveals Cade's whereabouts.
37	15	"Playland"	Michael Robison	Chris Brancato & Albert J. Salke	December 29, 1999
Following up on the murder of some innocent people at a fast-food outlet by a teenager, Foster travels through a portal and finds himself among 2 warring factions of street youths in a deserted fairground. Another GUA experiment? But why?
38	16	"The Harvest"	Randy Cheveldave	Andrea Stevens	January 5, 2000
3 young women disappear in Boston, Foster follows a quatrain that seems to point to this being of interest. He teams up with the sister of one of the missing women to find out what has happened and why.
39	17	"Rubicon"	Michael Robison	David Wilcox	January 12, 2000
Foster narrowly escapes death from a bomb blast and finds himself waking 13 days later in a government-run facility that apparently monitors and hunts the GUA. He is pardoned by the President. This sounds too good to be true, so is it?
40	18	"Gladiator"	Alex Pappas	Michael Thoma	May 17, 2000
An alien experiment involving bare-knuckle fighters gets Cade to ask an old prison friend Omar Healy, a former convict and prize fighter, to enter a boxing competition for him, Cade posing as his trainer. He needs Healy to help him get into the Human Genome Project as he suspects that the Gua were there to genetically engineer a super warrior. Cade takes Eddie with him, as he thinks Eddie's scientific expertise could be needed. Eddie has also runs some checks on the doctors there, one was possibly human but the other could well be a Gua. Tensions with Eddie didn't make Omar any more happy to be on board, but he sticks with them. The doctor they thought was human turns out to be Gua and it looks like Cade will may have to take on the Gua super warrior himself.
41	19	"The Trial of Joshua Bridges"	Gilbert Shilton	Chris Brancato & Albert J. Salke & Daniel Cerone & Peter Elkoff & Theresa Rebeck	May 24, 2000
On trial for his life by the GUA, Joshua is sentenced to mind realignment and his consciousness uploaded for punishment. Foster rescues him mid-process and escapes with a very confused Joshua who begins to question some of his choices.
42	20	"Underworld"	Rob LaBelle	Larry Barber & Paul Barber	May 31, 2000
A mob boss narrowly escapes death by a GUA assassin, meanwhile Foster follows a Quatrain and poses as a mob gunman for hire, to get inside the crime syndicates and find out why and what are the GUA's goals.
43	21	"Tomorrow"	George Mendeluk	Chris Brancato & Paul Eckstein	June 7, 2000
Cade wakes ups in an alley after being brainwashed by the Gua who have tried to extract information from him. He sees posters about Human-Gua cooperation giving him a glimpse of what the world would be like during the alien occupation of earth.
44	22	"The Believers"	Holly Dale	Chris Brancato & Albert J. Salke	June 14, 2000
After 2 years of fighting the Gua Foster and Eddie try a desperate move and take hostages in a television broadcast studio, in an effort to raise awareness of the invasion to a huge audience, but not all goes according to plan.

=== Season 3 (2000–2001) ===
No. overall	No. in season	Title	Directed by	Written by	Original release date
45	1	"Mabus"	Michael Rohl	Daniel Cerone	September 13, 2000
Partly a prequel to the second season cliffhanger, it's here explained what actually happened to Foster during his TV broadcast exposé. Introduces the anti-Gua group Raven Nation and a new quest - to defeat the new Gua leader, Mabus.
46	2	"Raven Nation"	Chris Brancato & Michael J. Cinquemani	Holly Dale	September 20, 2000
Eddie intercepts an email which he and Foster trace to the anti-Gua fighters Raven Nation's headquarters and learn about their origins and tactics. The Gua also intercept the email and follow them.
47	3	"Comes a Horseman"	Michael Robison	David Tynan	September 27, 2000
Foster is quarantined inside a lab that contains a deadly contagion engineered by the Gua.
48	4	"Gulag"	Holly Dale	David Wilcox	October 4, 2000
Foster enters a "quantum pocket" containing an endless time-loop in an attempt to free Joshua Bridges, who has been imprisoned there as a form of Gua punishment.
49	5	"The Flight of Francis Jeffries"	Michael Rohl	Story by : David Wilcox & Micheal Glassberg; Teleplay by : Micheal Glassberg	October 11, 2000
A scientist is brutally murdered by his teenage daughter, but when Foster investigates he finds she has no memory of the event at all. He also uncovers a Gua experiment that could change everything for the worse for the human race.
50	6	"Still At Large"	Ken Girotti	Gary Sherman	October 18, 2000
Eddie gets a tip-off that there are documents that can prove Foster is innocent of his wife's murder. But these are in a busy Chicago police station, so Foster and Jordan go undercover to search for them.
51	7	"Asylum"	Bill Corcoran	Bill Conway	October 25, 2000
Eddie infiltrates an insane asylum in search of answers. However he becomes an unwilling test subject for the aliens.
52	8	"Eyes of the Gua"	Ken Girotti	David Wilcox	November 1, 2000
A series of strange ritualistic murders sets Foster on the trail of suspected Gua activity. The police have no clues apart from the sighting of someone matching the description of Joshua. Foster needs to find out what is happening and why.
53	9	"Skywatchers"	Randolph Cheveldave	Michael Thoma	November 8, 2000
The disappearance of a Raven Nation operative leads Foster and Jordan to a small mining town, where they find that the operative was on to something big involving the Gua. Something is not quite right in this small town, but what?
54	10	"The Plan"	Michael Robison	Chris Brancato	November 15, 2000
Mabus plans to bring forward the second wave but not all of his Generals agree. Two of them secretly team up with Joshua and approach Foster with a daring plan to stop Mabus.
55	11	"Wednesday's Child"	George Mendeluk	Robin Brancato	November 22, 2000
Mabus plots to capture Jordan by invading the mind of an 11-year-old girl, then controlling her to set an elaborate trap for Foster, Eddie and Jordan to fall into.
56	12	"Unearthed"	Micheal Rohl	Bill Conway	November 29, 2000
Eddie and Jordan, suspecting Gua involvement, are working undercover at an archaeological site looking for the mythical hammer of Thor. Foster covertly discovers something important but then he is dragged into a strange portal.
57	13	"Shadowland"	Michael Robison	Story by : David Tynan & Michael J. Cinquemani; Teleplay by : David Tynan	December 6, 2000
Foster struggles with recurring nightmares of when he was a 12-year-old boy - but what happened, are his dreams trying to tell him something? A Quatrain seems to refer to this so he seeks answers through dream regression.
58	14	"Legacy"	Rob LaBelle	Paul Eckstein	December 13, 2000
While attending a ball, Jordan is captured by the Gua and has her memories of them, Cade, and Raven Nation erased.
59	15	"The Edge"	Michael Rohl	David Wilcox	December 20, 2000
A raven nation scientist develops a weapon that will kill Gua and not humans. He secretly injects Foster with Gua DNA to make him stronger then gets killed before he can reverse it. Eddie and Jordan must now face a terrible decision.
60	16	"The Vessel"	Michael Robison	Daniel Howard Cerone	December 27, 2000
Mabus plans to control the World's computer systems by transferring his consciousness into the body of Earth's leading computer business CEO. Foster has to stop him before the Gua can get the new operating system online.
61	17	"Requiem"	Randolph Cheveldave	Bill Conway	January 3, 2001
Mabus has taken control of Jordan and the Raven Nation is in danger. Foster sends out the alarm to four Raven Nation Generals to meet at a secret bunker to warn them, but the bunker is compromised and they end up trapped, but by whom or what?
62	18	"Checkmate"	Michael Robison	Story by : Paul Eckstein & David Wilcox; Teleplay by : Paul Eckstein	January 10, 2001
With the Raven Nation destroyed all hope seems lost for Foster and Eddie, then the Gua move in and capture them. Eddie is tortured for information while Foster is taken to Mabus/Jordan. But an ally shows there still may be hope for them and the human race.
63	19	"Black Box"	Ken Girotti	David Wilcox	January 17, 2001
Cade and Eddie travel to Colorado's Rocky Mountains to find the source of a powerful magnetic anomaly and cross paths with a guarded Joshua.
64	20	"Beneath The Black Sky"	Michael Rohl	Story by : Michael J. Cinquemani; Teleplay by : Louis Venosta	January 24, 2001
Cade loses track of Eddie after the pair are caught in a Gua ambush. Cade later encounters an alien sensei called Xevallah who claims he can help Cade save both his friend and humanity.
65	21	"Terminal City"	Ken Girotti	Michael Thoma	January 31, 2001
Cade joins Eddie and Joshua in a last-ditch mission to thwart the coming of the second wave of Gua assaults on Earth, as the trio sets off to destroy the aliens' secret weapon. But their plans hit a snag when Cade encounters his cynical future self.
66	22	"Twice Bless'd"	Bill Corcoran	Chris Brancato & Fergus Cook	February 7, 2001
In the series finale, Cade awakens in a psychiatric ward alongside Eddie and Jordan, where his claims of alien invaders are disregarded. Then he realizes he's been duped by Mabus, leading to a final confrontation.
