= Crad Kilodney =

Canadian writer (1948–2014)

- Born: Lou Trifon; 1948; Jamaica, New York
- Died: April 14, 2014 (aged 65–66); Toronto, Ontario
- Education: University of Michigan
- Occupation: Writer

Crad Kilodney (1948 – April 14, 2014) was the pen name of Lou Trifon, an American-born Canadian writer who lived in Toronto, Ontario. He was best known for selling his self-published books (often with titles such as Bloodsucking Monkeys from North Tonawanda, Suburban Chicken-strangling Stories and Putrid Scum) on the streets of the city between about 1978 and 1995.

== Biography ==
=== Early life ===
Louis Trifon (as he was then known) was born in Jamaica, New York, in 1948 to a Greek family. In the autobiographical book "Excrement", he says that February 13 is his birthday. He graduated from Syosset High School in 1965, then obtained a degree in astronomy from the University of Michigan. Instead of continuing in that field, he took a job at Exposition Press, a self-publishing vanity press based in Hicksville, New York. Many of his experiences in that job, and with vanity publishing in general, shaped his outlook on fiction and provided him with material for many stories. The stories "Three Dead Men" and "A Moment of Silence for Man Ray" (both in Girl on the Subway) are examples of this.

He sold a few humor-oriented articles to the Houston Post in 1969, and taking on the name "Crad Kilodney", published very occasional pieces in The National Lampoon between 1970 and 1972. According to information on his unofficial website, Kilodney wrote the first unsolicited short story ever accepted by National Lampoon, a science fiction parody entitled "The Day Saturn Crashed into the Earth". It appeared in their fifth issue.

=== Move to Canada, and self-publishing ===
Trifon moved to Toronto in 1973 where he worked at a number of other book publishers, mostly in their stockrooms. While doing so, he continued to make very occasional sales of short stories and humor pieces to small magazines, but decided that it might be best to reach people by self-publishing his stories (under his own Charnel House imprint) and selling them face-to-face on the street. This he did from 1978 through 1995, publishing 32 books in this manner, using the name Crad Kilodney. Kilodney could generally be found, and indeed was a fixture, on Yonge Street, at the University of Toronto downtown campus and in front of the Toronto Stock Exchange building with a cardboard sign hanging from his neck, holding a book he was selling. His attention-getting signage, always handwritten, might give a book title (e.g., Simple Stories For Idiots), or a mocking self-description of his wares (e.g., "Slimy Degenerate Literature").

The books themselves were usually pamphlet-sized collections of short stories, ranging from 32 to 80 pages in length. More rarely, as with Terminal Ward (1983) or Cathy (1985) the works were single novelette-length stories; Putrid Scum (1991) was Kilodney's only full novel. Though the vast majority of the work offered for sale was Kilodney's own, he also edited and sold several anthologies under the banner of Worst Canadian Stories and The Charnel House Anthology of Bad Poetry. Kilodney later admitted that most—although not all—of the Worst Canadian Stories material was written by him ("and a group of selected colleagues") in a range of deliberately awful styles, under a variety of pseudonyms. He insisted, however, that the bad poetry he anthologized had been collected from a number of sources, and it was all correctly attributed (including works by Leonard Nimoy, William McGonagall, Karen Mac Cormack, and at least one poem attributed to Kilodney himself.) Though he sold most of his work on the streets of Toronto, in the acknowledgments section of Worst Canadian Stories, Vol. 1 Kilodney thanks his sister Carol, noting that "she sells many of my books in her pizzeria in Westbury, New York."

Kilodney was in a relationship with poet and novelist Gwendolyn MacEwen before she died in 1987.

Kilodney commented that while most writers are inspired by conventionally great literature, he drew inspiration from the exact opposite: the slush pile, the crank letter, and of course the vanity press. He was not interested in being seen as a crank or an eccentric, but simply wanted to find respectable, legitimate work as a writer and be taken seriously for doing so. Nevertheless, he also enjoyed pranks, and in 1988, Kilodney submitted a number of stories by famous writers to the CBC Radio literary competition, many under absurd names. All of the stories were screened out by the jury.

More in line with Kilodney's literary ambitions, also in 1988 Black Moss Press issued a 'best-of' collection called Malignant Humours. A follow-up collection (Girl On The Subway and other stories) appeared in 1990. These were generally the only Kilodney volumes available in bookstores.

Writing in The Calgary Herald, Glen Colbourn called the stories in Malignant Humours "offbeat, puzzling and, quite frankly, outrageous ... Kilodney's absurdist style and quirky humor will limit his appeal largely to adventurous readers. But those readers will find some entertaining stories in the new collection."

Other mainstream critics also praised Kilodney's fiction.

Writing in The Windsor Star, Marty Gervais called Pork College

one of the funniest books of the year, and it ought to be a bestseller ... But what is Pork College all about? Well, it's hard to say ... There's no high point to it, except perhaps in great one-liners ... but then again, it's not meant to develop into anything more than what it Is. And what is that? Just stories of funny bits taking shots at the institutional world. And these are worth reading just for the sheer joy of reading.

Although Evelyn Lau, in an Edmonton Journal review of Girl on the Subway called the book's stories "sadly uneven," she went on to say

Kilodney is at his best when his sense of humor steps in, ironic, mocking and laced with sadness ... The Funeral of Lenny Zeller, about the joke perpetrated by an English teacher after the death of one of the students he loved, is an absolute treat. It is infused with bright language and a side-splitting hilarity, as well as an underlying quiet bitterness and tragedy ... When Kilodney allows himself, he has sympathy and understanding for people and what makes them work, or not work. In much the same way, The Simplified Existence of Mr. Duggins succeeds because the author forgets himself and enters the spirit of another person trapped in a different kind of world. On the whole, Girl on the Subway contains a few remarkable gems...

In The South Florida Sun-Sentinel, Richard Grayson called Bloodsucking Monkeys From North Tonawanda "a collection of short stories by Canada's funniest fiction writer. The title story is the funniest story I've read in years. Kilodney is an undiscovered genius..."

Kilodney also wrote for a variety of publications, Canadian and otherwise, such as Only Paper Today, 'What' (a literary magazine), and Rustler (for which he wrote a monthly column at one point).

In 1991, Kilodney was charged with selling commercial goods without a licence, making him the only Canadian writer ever charged for selling his own writing. In response, Toronto hardcore band (and long time supporters of the Independent DIY ethos) Armed & Hammered released the song "Crad Kilodney Was Innocent" on a 7" single vinyl record.

=== Audio recordings ===
At various times Kilodney kept a tape recorder with him and recorded byplay between himself and prospective customers. He then compiled the exchanges into hand-made cassette tapes ("On The Street With Crad Kilodney" Vols 1, 2, 3, and 4) which he offered for sale alongside his books. They are extremely rare and are collector's items (much as original printings of his books are).

Vol. 3 (a 90-minute cassette) is from 1991. "Dub 154" of this tape, a representative example, includes photocopied typewritten notes detailing the recording process, transfer technique and equipment used. Kilodney handwrote with ballpoint pen on the cassette jacket as well. Side A has 11 recordings, Side B 16 recordings; four of the recordings are answering machine messages, and the rest are the famous surreptitious encounters with people wondering why this man has a sign around his neck. "Excrement" and "Putrid Scum", as well as several of his stories (such as "Henry", featured in Girl on the Subway) are also inspired by these experiences.

=== Retirement from self-publishing and later work ===
After receiving an inheritance, Kilodney retired from selling his self-published books in 1995. To continue making income, he took up trading mining stocks, which allowed him to live modestly for the rest of his life. Nevertheless, he continued writing, and looked for new ways to distribute his material. In 1996, Kilodney's satirical piece "Circumcision Rites of the Toronto Stock Exchange" appeared in the 1996 Pushcart Prize anthology, and in 1998 his previously published story "Girl On The Subway" was included in the mainstream literary anthology Concrete Forest: The New Fiction of Urban Canada, published by McClelland & Stewart. A fan-based website, run by Syd Allan, featured occasional new material from Kilodney up until 2004.

From April 2008 until a few months before his death, new satirical articles (and the occasional short story) were posted on Kilodney's blog. A series of 20 articles on "Exotic Cities" that had been published in 2009 were translated into French by Philippe Billé and collected in the volume Villes Bigrement Exotiques (2012). This was the last of Kilodney's books published in his lifetime.

Kilodney posted his final blog entry, a short story called "Dreaming With Jay", in December 2013. He thanked his readers for their support, and noted that "This is the last piece I will publish in my lifetime."

Kilodney died of cancer on April 14, 2014, at the age of 66. He never married, and left no heirs. The day after his death and at his request, his friend, artist Lorette C. Luzajic, launched the Crad Kilodney Literary Foundation, a website dedicated to preserving and promoting his works. A posthumous collection of his online writings, Strong Meat, appeared in 2015.

== Bibliography ==
=== Short story & collections ===
Most of these collections contain 3 to 8 stories, and are between 34 and 80 pages in length. Most were self published, and appeared as stapled, photocopied pamphlets, in print runs of 800–1,200 copies. There are exceptions: Lightning Struck My Dick is over 100 pages, contains 18 stories, and was published by Virago Press. Pork College was published by Coach House Press. Strong Meat, issued posthumously, is almost 400 pages.

year	title	type
1978	Mental Cases	Short story
1979	World Under Anaesthesia	Short story
1980	Gainfully Employed in Limbo	Short story
1980	Lightning Struck My Dick	Short story
1981	Human Secrets - Book One	Short story
1982	Human Secrets - Book Two	Short story
1982	Sex Slaves Of The Astro-Mutants	Short story
1983	Terminal Ward	Novelettes
1984	Pork College	Short story
1984	Bang Heads Here, Suffering Bastards!	Short story
1984	The Orange Book: The Bent Humour of Crad Kilodney	Short story
1985	The Blue Book: The Eccentric Humour of Crad Kilodney	Short story
1985	The Yellow Book: The Outlandish Humour of Crad Kilodney	Short story
1985	The Scarlet Book: The Flame-Broiled Humour of Crad Kilodney	Short story
1985	Cathy	Novelettes
1986	Incurable Trucks & Speeding Diseases	Short story
1986	Simple Stories For Idiots	Short story
1986	Foul Pus From Dead Dogs	Novelettes
1988	Nice Stories for Canadians	Short story
1988	I Chewed Mrs. Ewing's Raw Guts	Short story
1988	Excrement	Novelettes
1989	Blood Sucking Monkeys from North Tonawanda	Short story
1990	Junior Brain Tumours in Action	Short story
1991	Putrid Scum	Novel
1992	Suburban Chicken Strangling Stories	Short story
2012	Villes Bigrement Exotiques	Travelogue (French language only)
2015	Strong Meat	assorted on line writing, 1988 - 2013

=== Anthologies of previously collected stories ===
Black Moss Press issued two anthologies, each around 100 pages, of Kilodney's 'selected stories'. Aside from Pork College, these were the only Kilodney volumes generally available for sale in bookstores.

year	title	type
1988	Malignant Humors	13 stories, dating between 1978 and 1985
1990	Girl on the Subway and other stories	11 stories, dating between 1979 and 1988

=== As editor ===
year	title	type
1987	Worst Canadian Stories, Vol. 1	Short story
1989	The First Charnel House Anthology of Bad Poetry	Short story
1992	The Second Charnel House Anthology of Bad Poetry	Short story

=== Collaborative work ===
- Prose Political (1977) (18-page booklet, as Louis Trifon, with Mick Rawsterne and George Cairncross)
