= The View from Here: Conversations with Gay and Lesbian Filmmakers =

2007 book by Matthew Hays

- Author: Matthew Hays
- Publication date: 2006
- ISBN: 9-781-55152220-3

The View from Here: Conversations with Gay and Lesbian Filmmakers is a book by Canadian film journalist Matthew Hays, published in 2007 by Arsenal Pulp Press.

Filmmakers interviewed in the book include John Waters, Pedro Almodóvar, Gus Van Sant, John Cameron Mitchell, Don Roos, Randal Kleiser, Don Mancini, Kenneth Anger, Gregg Araki, Léa Pool, Wakefield Poole, Monika Treut, Rosa von Praunheim, John Greyson, Bruce LaBruce, Robert Lepage, Patricia Rozema, Janis Cole, David Secter, Lynne Fernie and Aerlyn Weissman.

The book won a Lambda Literary Award in 2008 in the category of LGBT Arts and Culture.

== See also ==
- List of lesbian filmmakers
- Women in film
