= Michael J. Cinquemani =

Michael J. Cinquemani is an American television writer and video game developer. He has written for The Vampire Diaries, Lucky 7 and First Wave.

== Career ==
Cinquemani began his career in soap operas as a script coordinator, and later script writer on General Hospital (2001 - 2005). He also worked on network programmes, working as script writer on All My Children (2008), staff writer on "10 Things I Hate About You" (2009) and staff writer on Brothers & Sisters" (2009–2011). Most recently, he wrote on Jane the Virgin (2014–2019) and الآنسة فرح (Miss Farah) (2019–2022).

Outside of television, Cinequemani has also worked on video games, working as lead narrative designer for Harry Potter: Hogwarts Mystery. In 2022, he was made chief content officer at Fusebox Games, for its LA studio.

== Awards and nominations ==
- Daytime Emmy Award
