= Lynne Fernie =

Canadian documentary filmmaker

- Born: 1946 (age 79–80); Toronto, Ontario, Canada
- Education: Ontario College of Art and Design University honors graduate
- Occupation: Documentary filmmaker
- Known for: Forbidden Love: The Unashamed Stories of Lesbian Lives

Lynne Fernie (born 1946) is a Canadian filmmaker and interdisciplinary artist. She spent fourteen years as the Canadian Spectrum programmer for the Hot Docs Festival from 2002 to 2016, and was described as having a passion as "deep as her knowledge," and it was said that her "championing of Canadian documentaries and the people who make them has never wavered."

== Career ==
Fernie was the co-director with Aerlyn Weissman of the award-winning 1992 documentary film Forbidden Love: The Unashamed Stories of Lesbian Lives. They also co-directed Fiction and Other Truths: a film about Jane Rule, an award-winning biography about the author and Order of Canada recipient, Jane Rule. Her short films School's Out! (1996) and Apples and Oranges (2003) focus on issues of bullying and homophobia in schools. Apples and Oranges, is a film which was part animation, part documentary, and is for children of an elementary school age. It addressed issues of bullying and homophobia. It was produced by the National Film Board of Canada, with Fernie as director, and Tamara Lynch as producer. In the first segment, Anta, her two moms, and all-girl band work together to overcome a bully. In the second segment, Habib and Jeroux, two skateboarders, deal with homophobia after Jeroux comes out as gay. Forbidden Love was re-released on a streaming service in 2012 to celebrate its " place as an integral part of LGBT film history."

Fernie is a member of numerous arts and LGBT organizations in Toronto. She was a co-founding collective member of the feminist periodical Fireweed and worked as editor and editor-in-chief of the artist-run centre magazine Parallélogrammefor a number of years. She was engaged with LGBTQ+ culture with the Lesbian Organization of Toronto and the Inside Out Film and Video Festival. She was a frequent songwriting lyric writer and collaborator with the pop band Parachute Club, including lyrics for the band's most famous single, "Rise Up" which was inducted into the Canadian Songwriters Hall of Fame in November 2019. She also wrote lyrics to Neon Blue, the title track for Aaron Davis'first album, and collaborated with Lorraine Segato and Richard Underhill on "Bringing All the Voices Together", a theme song for Jack Layton's campaign in the 2003 New Democratic Party leadership election.

She taught production at the film studies department at York University for eight years, and is a programmer for the Hot Docs Canadian International Documentary Festival. A portrait of Fernie, by the artist Rafy, is held by The ArQuives: Canada's LGBTQ2+ Archives' National Portrait Collection, in honour of her role as a significant builder of LGBT culture and history in Canada. She is interviewed in Matthew Hays' Lambda Literary Award-winning 2007 book The View from Here: Conversations with Gay and Lesbian Filmmakers.

== Personal life ==
Lynne Fernie currently lives in Toronto and her visual art is available through the Oeno Gallery. She is an OCAD honours graduate in addition to being an award-winning documentary filmmaker. She has exhibited visual art and been the recipient of arts and film grants from the Canada Council, the Ontario Arts Council and the Toronto Arts Council, and has been a jury member of Canada Council and Ontario Arts Council, specifically the Lesbian and Gay Community Appeal Grant in 1997, Canada Council Research and Development Grant in 1995, the Canada Council “B” Grant in 1989, and the Canada Council Publication Assistance Grant in 1983.

== Filmography ==
=== Film ===
| Title | Year | Credited as | | | | Role | Notes |
| Title | Year | Writer | Executive Producer | Animation/Art department | Other | Role | Notes |
|---|---|---|---|---|---|---|---|
| Forbidden Love: The Unashamed Stories of Lesbian Lives | 1992 | No | Yes | No | Yes | Director | |
| Fiction and Other Truths: A Film About Jane Rule | 1995 | No | Yes | No | Yes | Director | |
| Portland: Strip City U.S.A./Strange Sisters: The Golden Age of Lesbian Pulp | 2002 | No | No | No | Yes | As herself | |
| SexTV | 2002 | No | No | No | Yes | As herself | |
| Fascination | 2006 | No | No | No | Yes | As herself | |
| Take This Waltz | 2011 | Yes | No | No | No | —N/a | |

=== Television ===
| Title | Year | Credited as | | | | Role | Notes |
| Title | Year | Writer | Executive Producer | Director | Animation/Art department | Role | Notes |
|---|---|---|---|---|---|---|---|
| QSW: The Rebel Zone | 2001 | Yes | No | No | No | | Writer of "Neon Blue" |
| Little Sister's vs. Big Brother | 2002 | No | Yes | No | No | | |
| Rise Up: Canadian Pop Music in the 1980s | 2009 | No | Yes | No | No | | |
| Katie Chats | 2015 | No | No | No | No | As herself | |
| HotDocs Press Conference Chats 2015 | 2015 | No | No | No | No | As herself | |

== Awards and nominations ==
| Year | Organization | Award | Category | Work | Result | Ref. |
|---|---|---|---|---|---|---|
| 1981 | Ontario Arts Council | M. Joan Chalmers Awards for Arts Administration, Artistic Direction and Documentary Film and Video (Note: Also known as the Chalmers Award) | | "Picnic in the Drift" | Won (Note: Also part of a writers grant) | |
| 1984 | Canadian Academy of Recording Arts and Sciences | Juno Award | Composer of the Year | "Rise Up" | Nominated | (Note: Source incorrectly states it was in 1983 and that she won the award, when she was actually only nominated for it) |
| 1993 | Academy of Canadian Cinema & Television | Genie Awards | Best Feature Length Documentary | Forbidden Love: The unashamed Stories of Lesbian Lives | Won (Note: Shared with Aerlyn Weissman) | |
| 1995 | San Francisco International Lesbian & Gay Film Festival | Audience Award | Best Documentary | Fiction and Other Truths: A Film About Jane Rule | Won (Note: Shared with Aerlyn Weissman) | |
| 1996 | Academy of Canadian Cinema & Television | Genie Awards | Best Short Documentary | Fiction and Other Truths: A Film About Jane Rule | Won (Note: Shared with Aerlyn Weissman) | |
| 1996 | L.A Outfest | Audience Award | Outstanding Documentary Short Film | Fiction and Other Truths: A Film About Jane Rule | Won (Note: Shared with Aerlyn Weissman) | |
| 1996 | Toronto Arts Council | Toronto Arts Council Award | Visual art | Visual art | Won | |

== Exhibitions ==
| Exhibition Name | Organizer | Country | Dates | Ref |
|---|---|---|---|---|
| Toronto Survey Exhibition (Note: curated by Nancy Nichol) | Women in Focus Gallery | Vancouver, BC | 1983 | |
| Desire | Alter Eros Festival | Gallery 76, Toronto, ON | 1984 | |
| The Anti-Nuke Show (Note: Show toured Canada) | Powerhouse | Montreal, QC | 1984-1985 | |
| The Gaze (Note: exhibit in conjunction with the 7th annual conference of the International Gay Association) | A.R.C. | Toronto, ON | 1985 | |
| Some Uncertain Signs (Note: text work) | Plexiboard (Note: At Yonge St. & Wellesley St) | Toronto, ON | 1986 | |
| Sight Specific | A Space | Toronto, ON | 1987 | |
| Forbidden Representations | Galerie SAW | Ottawa, ON | 1988 | |
| Go Figure (Note: inaugural group exhibition) | SPIN Gallery | Toronto, ON | 2000 | |
| The Wonders of Animal Instincts (Note: two-person show with Wendy Coburn) | Khrome | Toronto, ON | 2001 | |
| Group exhibition curated by Cheryl Sourkes | Akau | Toronto, ON | 2005 | |
| The Grace of Falling (Note: solo exhibition) | Oeno Gallery | Prince Edward County, ON | 2006 | |
| Defying Gravity | Oeno Gallery | Prince Edward County, ON | 2011 | |
| 3rd Anniversary Exhibition | Oeno Gallery | Prince Edward County, ON | 2012 | |
| Spring Group Exhibition | Oeno Gallery | Prince Edward County, ON | 2012 | |
| Decibel | Oeno Gallery | Prince Edward County, ON | 2013 | |

== See also ==
- List of female film and television directors
- List of lesbian filmmakers
- List of LGBT-related films directed by women
