= Forbidden Love: The Unashamed Stories of Lesbian Lives =

1992 Canadian documentary film directed by Lynne Fernie

- VHS cover
- Directed by: Lynne Fernie; Aerlyn Weissman
- Written by: Lynne Fernie; Aerlyn Weissman
- Produced by: Margaret Pettigrew; Ginny Stikeman, Rina Fraticelli
- Starring: Stephaine Morgenstern, Lynne Adams, Marie-Jo Thério, George Thomas, Lory Wainberg, Ann-Marie MacDonald, Michael Copeland
- Cinematography: Zoe Dirse
- Edited by: Denise Beaudoin; Cathy Gulkin
- Music by: Kathryn Moses
- Distributed by: National Film Board of Canada; Women Make Movies
- Release date: September 17, 1992 (TIFF)
- Running time: 84 minutes 35 seconds
- Country: Canada
- Language: English

Forbidden Love: The Unashamed Stories of Lesbian Lives is a 1992 Canadian hybrid drama-documentary film about Canadian lesbians navigating their sexuality while homosexuality was still criminalized. Interviews with lesbian elders are juxtaposed with a fictional story, shot in fifties melodrama style, of a small-town girl's first night with another woman. It also inserts covers of lesbian pulp fiction. The film presents the stories of lesbians whose desire for community led them on a search for the few public beer parlours or bars that would tolerate openly queer women in the 1950s and 60s in Canada. It was written and directed by Lynne Fernie and Aerlyn Weissman and featured author Ann Bannon. It premiered at the 1992 Toronto Festival of Festivals and was released in the United States on 4 August 1993. It was produced by Studio D, the women's studio of the National Film Board of Canada.

In May 2014, the National Film Board of Canada ("NFB") re-released the film in a digitally remastered version.

== Subject matter ==
The film is structured around four dramatic segments with interviews interspersed in which a depiction of a retro pulp lesbian romance is recreated on-screen and altered to include a happy ending for the characters.

The movie opens with a dramatized scene of two women saying goodbye at a train station, alluding that they were to run away together. One of the women, named "Beth" declines to go with "Laura" and leaves her at the station.

A discussion of the impact of lesbian pulp fiction for women in the 1940s and 1950s begins, featuring Ann Bannon, discussing her experiences as a writer in the 1950s. Nine Canadian women are interviewed throughout the documentary: Keely, a butch woman living near Vancouver, Stephanie, also in Vancouver, Reva, in Victoria, B.C., Lois, also in Toronto, Nairobi, a black woman living in Montreal, Jeanne, also in Toronto, Amanda, a Haida woman who lived in several Canadian cities, Carol, a butch woman living in Ontario, and Ruth, also living in Vancouver.

Each woman discussed her experience in realizing her attraction to women, and how they pursued relationships in the repressive society. Some women felt they had to choose to be butch or femme as all women who went to bars during that time had to choose one or the other. The women who frequented the bars discussed the kinds of establishments they were, secretive and usually dingy. Ruth described the only bar where women were allowed to dance with each other in Vancouver as a "dive". Bars sometimes were open for a year before they were shut down or changed management. Some higher class establishments would only allow women with male escorts, so the women took gay men along. Stephanie, Lois, and Carol discussed the fights that took place between butch women over femmes since the ratio was about ten to one. Amanda discussed her experiences living in a white society. She found gay bars depressing since most of the people were usually very drunk, so she often went to bars where black people went since she was bothered less there. Nairobi described in detail what it was like to be in a police raid, and Stephanie described how the women met with police harassment. Each woman also described the relationships they had. Reva and Jeanne both discussed how they began relationships with ex-girlfriends of ex-girlfriends, who in turn lived with each other and Stephanie discussed being in an abusive relationship. Each woman talks about her life with frankness and humor. The interviews conclude with summaries of the past 20 years of each woman's life.

The interviews are interwoven with the dramatization of Laura entering a gay bar for the first time and meeting a woman named "Mitch" who buys her a drink, and they end up at Mitch's apartment.

== Significance ==
Forbidden Love stands out from other Studio D documentaries "as an exception to its decision to remain resolutely in the camp of feminist realist documentary. Departing from the Studio's oft criticized 'didactic aesthetics', this documentary plays with theoretical constructs, mixing genres and celebrating lesbian reality as it embraces diversity and experience broadly."

== Participants ==
- Stephanie Morgenstern
- Lynne Adams
- Marie-Jo Thério
- George Thomas
- Lory Wainberg
- Ann-Marie MacDonald
- Michael Copeland

== Film background ==
Prior to the making of the film, the National Film Board's women's unit Studio D had received criticism for failing to produce a feature-length film that highlighted the experiences of queer women. The idea for the film originated in 1987 when Aerlyn Weissman and Lynn Fernie were approached by the National Film Board of Canada to submit a proposal to create a Canadian lesbian film. After officially meeting on a film shoot in 1988, Fernie and Weissman began talking about the lack of films representing the experiences of lesbian women. Fernie stated that "we got to talking about films about lesbians, and how we didn’t know anything about the history of lesbians in Canada, and how great it would be to have a film specifically about that." Fernie and Weissman thus sought out a producer to help create the film, securing the support of a Studio D producer named Rina Fraticelli.

The research process for the film was arduous as they looked through the Canadian Gay and Lesbian archives, newspaper clippings, and archival footage for any evidence of lesbian cultural history in Canada. During the production of the film there was resistance to the project, of which Weissman expressed that "the [Studio] wanted nice stories. Despite butch/femme being the lesbian style of the ‘50s, they were uneasy with it. I think Lynne particularly understood that some of the problems the people at Studio D were having were indicative of their own lack of political evolution." In addition, this documentary went against the traditional documentary styling of Studio D's previous films. Within the Studio the concern was that the drama of the fictionalized story would over shadow or belittle the women's stories in the documentary. According to Lynne Fernie, once putting the film together they knew that "nothing was going to overpower the personalities and storytelling of the women in the documentary."

Recognizing that portrayals of lesbian experiences in popular media often depicted them as having tragic and unfortunate lives, Fernie and Weissman sought to include interviews of women that lived during the ‘40s, ‘50s, and ‘60s to share their personal accounts of what life was actually like as lesbian women during those times. Fernie and Weissman also included interviews with pulp lesbian novelist Ann Bannon, discussing how she would write a "stealth code" into her books to relay hidden messages to closeted readers due to such topics being taboo. In discussing their decision to frame the film around a recreation of a lesbian pulp novel but with a happy ending, Weissman stated that "we wanted to present a reinterpretation of the traditional pulp novel ending because most of them ended with the lesbian killing herself and her temporarily-swept-away beautiful young lover going back to the husband, who had suddenly turned into a nice guy...we wanted to present the kind of happy ending that you didn’t get to see in the ’50s, where it all turned out well."

== Themes ==
The movie explores themes of butch-femme roles in relationships "as a defining device of lesbian identity set in significant historical context" as well as themes of age and identity. In a 1994 review, The Gerontologist reflects that "[Forbidden Love] take[s] the viewer into the private lives of older lesbians, illuminating the discriminating past of secret life styles and the price that "being different" played in shaping personal identity."

== Allusions to literature ==
The characters of Beth and Laura are allusions to characters in Ann Bannon's Beebo Brinker Chronicles, the six lesbian pulp fiction novels she wrote. Bannon's first book, Odd Girl Out ends very much like the opening sequence of the film, with Beth leaving Laura at a train station while a man named Charlie waits for her, as a Charlie waits for the Beth in Forbidden Love. Bannon has stated that a major influence on her choice to write lesbian pulp fiction was the novel Spring Fire by Vin Packer, which features a lesbian character named Susan Mitchell, who goes by her nickname Mitch.

== Reception ==
The film received positive reviews in Canada, the United States and Australia.

=== Canada ===
The film received positive reception from other filmmakers and was praised for the films unique styling "a rich and rewarding look at the lesbian subculture of the 1950s and 1960s as expressed through the lurid and often amusing pulp novels of the period." The Gazette in Montreal called it "deliberately campy" and director Lynne Fermie spoke of her intentions for the film. "We wanted this film to be on television. This part of Canadian history has been so silenced that we should be able to hear all our divergent stories, and we should be able to see them on the CBC." The Globe and Mail reviewed it and wrote, "There are scores of stories, all well told and crisply edited, that range from the very funny to the very sad and they are so compelling that the erotic fiction segments...seem dim only in contrast. The power of Forbidden Love is the extraordinary honesty and courage of its players." The Toronto Star praised the direction and production. "Weismann and Fernie's film is designed to contribute to the fast-growing records of the gay culture. After decades of suppression and shame, homosexuality is finally gaining the tolerance (if not, unfortunately, the acceptance) of the general public - and it's heartening that their voices can now be heard through an institution like the NFB. This movie touches on 10 stories; there are undoubtedly thousands more waiting to be told."

Winnipeg feminist magazine Herizons wrote "From first frame to last, [Forbidden Love], deftly juggles hard-edged political analysis, kitschy romance, and the timeless, invaluable herstory of women telling truths about their own lives. The result is not the world split open, but one made a little more whole." University of Toronto Press praised the films representations "In their appropriation of the lesbian pulp genre, Fernie and Weissman counter the stereotypes of lesbians that often pervaded these books. Their version of events has the couple together in the end, well-adjusted, and leading openly lesbian lives." In addition the University of Toronto Press praised the styling of the film "Interested in using formal strategies to make accessible, pleasurable films, Fernie and Weissman bent Studio D aesthetic rules in Forbidden Love. [...] Their first line of attack was the decision not to have voice-over narration."

"Forbidden Love's talking heads and archival footage are intercut with a dramatization of a lesbian pulp novel, which climaxes in a sizzling love scene complete with deep kisses and bare breasts, surely a first for the NFB, Fernie says, though 'no one at the Board ever suggested cutting it.'"

"The film's opening plays knowingly with the conventions of the institutional style of the NFB by satirizing both the Board's logo and its tendency to warn viewers in writing about the contents of its films, despite their general tameness."

"Forbidden Love has the dubious honour of being one of the last films made by the women's unit, Studio D, as well as the first overtly lesbian film made at the NFB. Lynne Fernie suggests that the NFB's working processes, at the time Forbidden Love was conceived and produced, are largely responsible for its success. She cites Studio D, an overtly feminist space within the NFB with its visionary leader, Rina Fraticelli, as a major factor in allowing women to work, in large part, in a creative and supportive environment."

"Compelling, often hilarious and always rebellious, nine women paint a portrait of lesbian sexuality against a backdrop of tabloid headlines, book covers and dramatizations from lesbian pulp novels."

=== United States ===
The Boston Globe gave it positive reviews in the context of the pulp fiction at the time saying, "Repudiating the obligatory disastrous endings in those old novels, they seem to have enjoyed their lives as lesbians, and this film encourages us to share the liberation they had to steal from an oppressive, provincial society not disposed to give them any break at all." Like most of the other reviews, The New York Times was more impressed with the interviews than with the dramatic scenes, writing, "Whether they look like truckers or cowboys or sweet-faced grannies, the women seen in "Forbidden Love" have a shared sense of humor...Even in discussing the more turbulent aspects of their history, though, most of these women retain their wry outlook." The Duke University Press stated that it is the film to see "for every lesbian wannabe out for a quick fix, every heterosexual queer curious about the past, every out-of-it straight who's read Newsweek and wants to know where lesbian chic came from. It's the movie of choice for dykes who suffered through Claire of the Moon (1992), tore their hair out over Fried Green Tomatoes (1991), who wondered when -- when, oh lord, when -- someone would get around to telling the truth about the life. Take heart. Lynne Fernie and Aerlyn Weissman have made the film you've been yearning to see." "Forbidden Love makes some further inroads in the complex terrain of historical archaeology by intercutting the now requisite talking heads with reenactments based on the lesbian pulp novels of the Fifties and Sixties. Produced by the Women's Studio of the National Film Board of Canada, the writers/directors Aerlyn Weissman and Lynne Fernie had the budget to successfully reproduce a filmic effect similar to the sultry, bad-girl esthetic of the novels. The music croons; the blonde ingenue nervously nurses her drink; the mannish (but elegant) brunette seduces; and a new lesbian femme is born, along with a renewed mythology of lesbian history." A review in The American Historical Review described the film as "a brilliant documentary of lesbian lives in Canada in the 1950s and 1960s."

=== Australia ===
The Australian newspaper The Age wrote, "What wonderful, feisty women they are. Dare I say, some of the original wicked women...A corny lesbian mini-soap inspired by the pulp runs through the film. Just an excuse, so the directors say, for squeezing in a gratuitous love scene. This film is a hoot."

== Awards ==
In 1993 the film won the Genie Award for Best Feature Length Documentary and in 1994 it won the GLAAD Media Award for Outstanding Film (Documentary).

The film also won the Public Award for Best Feature-Length Documentary at the Festival international de films de Femmes in Créteil, France.

In addition Zoe Dirse received the Rogers-DOC Luminary Award by the Documentary Organization of Canada for her cinematography in the film.

== See also ==
- List of LGBT films directed by women
