= Brenda Longfellow =

Canadian filmmaker, environmentalist, and feminist

- Born: 1954 (age 71–72); Copper Cliff, Ontario, Canada
- Education: Carleton University (BA, MA); York University (PhD)
- Known for: Biographies of historic women
- Notable work: Our Marilyn; Tina in Mexico
- Awards: Genie Award for Best Short Documentary (1999)

Brenda Longfellow (born 1954) is a Canadian filmmaker known for her biographies of female historic figures. Since 2007, Longfellow's focus in her films has been on environmental issues.

== Early life and education ==
Brenda Longfellow was born in Copper Cliff, Ontario, in 1954. Longfellow earned a BA and an MA at Carleton University and completed a PhD at York University.

== Career ==
Longfellow is a professor of Film & Media Arts at York University. She is a film theorist and has published multiple articles related to Canadian cinema, documentary, and feminist film theory.

== Selected works ==
=== Film ===
- Our Marilyn (1987), an experimental 16 mm film about Marilyn Bell, received the Grand Prix at the International Short Film Festival Oberhausen, was purchased by the National Gallery of Canada in 1990.
- Shadow Maker: Gwendolyn MacEwen, Poet (1998), won the Award for Best Short Documentary at the 19th Genie Awards.
- Weather Report (2008), a TV documentary exploring climate change
- Carpe Diem (2010), a short opera about environmental disaster.
- Dead Ducks (2011), a short animated opera documentary.
- Offshore (2018), an interactive web documentary, received the AMPD Research Award from York University.

=== Books ===
- Armatage, Kay; Banning, Kass, Longfellow, Brenda; Marchessault, Janine (eds.) (1992). Gendering the Nation: Canadian Women's Cinema. University of Toronto Press. ISBN 978-0802041203.
- Pevere, Geoff; Handling, Piers; Hays, Matthew; Wise, Wyndham; Longfellow, Brenda; Gravestock, Steve; Edwards, Justin D. (2009). Toronto on Film. Wilfrid Laurier University Press. ISBN 9780968913222.
- MacKenzie, Scott; Waugh, Thomas; Longfellow, Brenda (eds.) (2013). The Perils of Pedagogy: The Works of John Greyson. McGill-Queen's University Press. ISBN 978-0-7735-4143-6.
