= Shadow Maker: Gwendolyn MacEwen, Poet =

1998 Canadian documentary film

- Directed by: Brenda Longfellow
- Written by: Brenda Longfellow
- Based on: Shadow Maker: The Life of Gwendolyn MacEwen by Rosemary Sullivan
- Produced by: Anita Herczeg
- Narrated by: Linda Griffiths
- Cinematography: Zoe Dirse
- Edited by: Cathy Gulkin
- Music by: Ernie Toller
- Production company: Gerda Film Productions
- Release date: September 9, 1998 (TIFF)
- Running time: 58 minutes
- Country: Canada
- Language: English

Shadow Maker: Gwendolyn MacEwen, Poet is a Canadian short documentary film, directed by Brenda Longfellow and released in 1998. Based in part on Rosemary Sullivan's 1995 biography Shadow Maker: The Life of Gwendolyn MacEwen, the film is a portrait of the life and work of Canadian poet Gwendolyn MacEwen.

The film had its theatrical premiere on February 24, 1998, at the John Spotton Theatre in Toronto, before being broadcast on March 4 as an episode of TVOntario's documentary series The View from Here.

The film won the Genie Award for Best Short Documentary at the 19th Genie Awards in 1999.
