= Holly Dale =

Canadian filmmaker and television director (born 1953)

- Born: December 23, 1953 (age 72); Toronto, Ontario, Canada
- Education: Sheridan College
- Occupations: Film director; Television director; Film editor; Producer; Screenwriter
- Years active: 1976–present
- Notable work: P4W: Prison for Women
- Awards: Gemini Award (1982)
- Website: www.hollydaledirector.com

Holly Dale (born December 23, 1953) is a Canadian filmmaker and television director. Over the course of her career, Dale has worked in the Canadian film and television industry as a director, producer, writer, and editor.

Although she has completed solo projects, the majority of Dale's work has been in collaboration with her former classmate, Janis Cole. The Thin Line (1977), P4W: Prison for Women (1981), and Hookers on Davie (1984) are some of their most recognized projects. Dale and Cole co-founded Spectrum Films in the early 1980s. Dale's work has been featured in festivals around the world including North America, Europe, and Australia. She has also received award nominations and wins, including a Gemini Award in 1982 for the Best Theatrical Documentary for P4W: Prison for Women.

== Early life and education ==
Holly Dale was born on December 23, 1953 and raised in a low-income household in Toronto, Ontario.

However, she decided to leave home as a teenager due to ongoing family conflict. During this time, she worked in non-therapeutic massage parlors in downtown Toronto. In the mid-1970s, Dale was accepted into the film studies program at Sheridan College in Oakville, Ontario. Here, she met Janis Cole, who she would continue to work with for the next 20 years.

== Career ==
=== Early career ===
Often working with a low budget, Dale began her film career as an independent documentary maker. Sharing the responsibilities of writing, directing, producing, and editing with Cole, the two women focused on showcasing social inequalities and hardships experienced by marginalized groups. Their choice to question and challenge class-based oppression and gender norms in their work prompted their reputation as feminist filmmakers.

=== Short and feature films ===
As students, Dale and Cole completed their first short film, Cream Soda, in 1976. This documentary revealed the demands on women employed in Toronto-based body-rub parlors. Meanwhile, their next film, Minimum Charge No Cover (1976), explored the lived experience of homosexuals, drag queens, sex workers, and substance users.

Their following short, The Thin Line (1977), documented the day to day lives of people who were deemed criminally insane and institutionalized in a maximum-security prison. While shooting this film, Dale and Cole admit they sought to emphasize the prisoners' humanity to provoke a sense of commonality with the audience, as opposed to solely focusing on their misconduct.

The content from this film motivated Dale and Cole's first feature documentary, P4W: Prison for Women (1981). After four years of communicating with officials, Dale and Cole were granted permission to film inside an all-woman prison outside of Kingston, Ontario, Canada. This marked the beginning of the documentary P4W: Prison for Women (1981). As co-directors and co-producers, Dale and Cole focused on the relationships between inmates as well as the prisoners' willingness to live despite ongoing challenges. This film was well received by critics and the public alike, winning several awards at film festivals and a Genie Award in 1982.

=== Spectrum Films ===
Dale and Cole decided to develop and operate the Toronto-based independent production company called Spectrum Films in the early 1980s. They registered the name as a partnership but when they tried to incorporate the company in the late 1980s, discovered that the name had already been used for another company. They therefore incorporated it as Spectrum-One Films Inc. Spectrum Films produced independent films of various lengths and genres, including Hookers on Davie; Calling the shots; P4W : prison for women; Blood & donuts; Thin line; The making of Agnes of God; and Dangerous offender. The company won a number of awards, including the 1988 Theatrical Producers Achievement Award and the 1994 Toronto Arts Award. It folded sometime between 2002 and 2026.

=== Television ===
In addition to her career in film, Dale has directed and produced episodes of different Canadian television series, including Bliss, Sue Thomas: F.B. Eye, Just Cause, Twice in a Lifetime, Durham County, Cold Case, and Being Erica. She has also directed two episodes of NCIS: Season 11's "Alibi" and Season 12's "Status Update".

== Filmography ==
=== Director ===
Year	Film title	Additional Roles
1975	Cream Soda	co-filmmaker with Janis Cole
1976	Minimum Charge No Cover	co-filmmaker with Janis Cole
1977	Nowhere to Run	co-producer, co-editor
1977	The Thin Line	co-filmmaker with Janis Cole
1981	P4W: Prison for Women	co-filmmaker with Janis Cole
1984	Hookers on Davie	co-filmmaker with Janis Cole
1985	Quiet on the Set	co-filmmaker with Janis Cole
1988	Calling the Shots	co-filmmaker with Janis Cole
1989	Dead Meat	
1994	Historica Minutes: Agnes Macphail	
1995	Blood and Donuts	
1996	Dangerous Offender	
1999	Amazon	
2006	Absolution	
2007	Hush Little Baby	

Year	Television Series Title	Episode Title
1994	Side Effects	In Sickness and in Health
1996	Traders	Sharper than a Serpent's Tooth
1997	Exhibit A: Secrets of Forensic Science	The Accident; Bone of Contention
1999	List of First Wave episodes	Blind Witness; The Heist; Night Falls
1999	Twice in a Lifetime	O'er the Ramparts We Watched; Second Service
2000	The City	Motivation
2000	List of First Wave episodes	The Believers; Raven Nation; Gulag
2000	Twice in a Lifetime	Birds of Paradise; For Love and Money; The Sins of our Fathers; Curveball; The Escape Artist; Expose; Grandma's Shoes
2001	Nero Wolfe	"Door to Death" "Christmas Party"
2001	Tracker	Tracker ("pilot")
2002	Bliss	Valentine's Day in Jail; Leaper
2002	Just Cause	Above the Law
2002	Tracker	Double Down; A Made Guy
2002	Jeremiah	Thieves' Honor
2003	Bliss	Nina's Muse; Cat got your Tongue
2003	Just Cause	Buried Past; Lies, Speculation & Deception
2003	List of Sue Thomas: F.B.Eye episodes	Diplomatic Immunity; He Said She Said; The Sniper
2004	The Collector	The Rapper; The Photographer; The Actuary; The Medium
2004	Doc	Blindsided
2004	Stargate Atlantis	Home
2004	List of Sue Thomas: F.B.Eye episodes	To Grandmother's House we Go; Rocket Man; Adventures in Babysitting
2005	1-800-Missing	Last Night; Have you Seen this Man?
2005	The Collector	The Comic; The Mother
2005	List of Sue Thomas: F.B.Eye episodes	Fraternity; Boy Meets World; Troy Story
2006	1-800-Missing	Double Take; So Shall ye Reap
2006	Angela's Eyes	Blue-Eyed Blues
2006	The Collector	The Chef; The V.J. The Junkie
2006	Kyle XY	The Lies that Bind
2006	Wildfire	Taking Off; Who are you
2007	Blood Ties	Stone Cold; Wrapped
2007	Cold Case	The Good-Bye Room; Running Around; Thick as Thieves; Boy Crazy
2007	The Dead Zone	Drift
2007	Durham County	What Lies Beneath; The Lady of the Lake; Divide and Conquer; Guys and Dolls
2008	Cold Case season 5	The Road; Roller Girl; Breaking News
2008	Flashpoint	Who's George? Attention Shoppers
2008	Heroes	Chapter Eleven 'The Eclipse - Part 2'
2008	List of Life episodes	Crushed
2008	Terminator: The Sarah Connor Chronicles	Self Made Man
2009	Being Erica	Dr. Tom; Erica, The Vampire Slayer
2010	Being Erica	The Rabbit Hole; Two Wrongs
2011	Castle	Head Case
2011	Law & Order: Special Victims Unit	Delinquent
2012	Dexter	Chemistry
2012	Law & Order: Special Victims Unit season 13	Child's Welfare
2013	The Americans	COMINT
2013	Agents of S.H.I.E.L.D.	"The Bridge"
2013	List of Castle episodes	Significant Others; Get a Clue
2013	Dexter	Are we There Yet
2013	Mistresses	Ultimatum
2013	NCIS	Alibi
2013	List of Reign episodes	Kissed
2014	Law & Order: Special Victims Unit season 15	Betrayal's Climax
2014	Agents of S.H.I.E.L.D.	"A Hen in the Wolf House"
2014	List of Castle episodes	The Greater Good
2014	List of Chicago Fire episodes	Keep your Mouth Shut; Santa Bites
2014	Extant	Wish You Were Here
2014	List of Reign episodes	Royal Blood; Corontation
2014	Under the Dome	Revelation
2015	Blue Bloods	In the Box
2015	List of Chicago Fire episodes	2112
2015	List of Chicago P.D. episodes	Disco Bob
2015	Law & Order: Special Victims Unit season 16	Granting immunity
2015	Mistresses	Threesomes; Love is an Open Door
2015	NCIS	Status Update
2015	Reign	Three Queens, Two Tigers; Extreme Measures
2015	The Whispers	Whatever it Takes
2016	Chicago Med	Guilty
2016	List of Chicago P.D. episodes	Now I'm God
2016	The Family	Fun Ways to tell your Boyfriend You're Pregnant
2016	Game of Silence	Into the Black
2016	Limitless	Hi, my Name is Rebecca Harris
2016	Quantico	Right
2016	Timeless	Stranded
2017	List of Bull (2016 TV series) episodes	Teacher's Pet
2017	List of Chicago Fire episodes	Babies and Fools
2017	Chicago Med	Deliver Us
2017	List of Chicago P.D. episodes	Favor, Affection, Malice or Ill-Will
2017	Law & Order: True Crime	Episode 3 Episode 4
2017	Mary Kills People	Bloody Mary; The River Styx; Wave the White Flag; Raised by Wolves; The Judas Cradle; Morning Glory
2017	Reign	All it Cost Her
2017	List of S.W.A.T. (2017 TV series) episodes	Miracle
2017	Taken	I Surrender
2018	God Friended Me	Matthew 621
2018	SEAL Team season 1	Takedown
2018	Take Two	Smoking Gun; Death Becomes Him; One to the Heart
2018	Timeless	The Kennedy Curse
2018	The X-Files	Familiar
2019	SEAL Team season 2	What Appears To Be; Dirt, Dirt Gucci
2019	The Code	Molly Marine
2019	Blood & Treasure	The Lunchbox of Destiny; The Shadow of Project Athena
2019	Batwoman	Who Are You?
2019	Batwoman	A Mad Tea-Party
2020	Transplant	"Pilot"
2020	Transplant	"Tell Me Who You Are"
2020	Transplant	"Your Secrets Can Kill You"
2020	Batwoman season 2	Off With Her Head
2021	Batwoman season 2	What Happened to Kate Kane?
2021	Batwoman season 2	Bat Girl Magic!
2021	Batwoman season 2	Survived Much Worse
2021	Batwoman season 2	Armed and Dangerous
2021	Batwoman season 2	Power
2021	Batwoman season 2	Mad as a Hatter
2021	Batwoman season 2	Antifreeze
2021	Batwoman season 2	Pick Your Poison
2022	Batwoman season 2	We Having Fun Yet?
2023	Will Trent	A Bad Temper and a Hard Heart
2023	FUBAR	"Stole Train"
2023	FUBAR	"Honeyplot"
2024	Law & Order: Organized Crime	"The Key to the Castle"
2024	Law & Order: Organized Crime	"The Real Eve"
2024	Law & Order: Organized Crime	"Three Points"
2024	Will Trent	"Capt. Duke Wagner's Daughter"
2024	The Irrational	"The Wrong Side of Maybe"
2025	Will Trent	"Mariachi Shelley's Frankenstein"
2025	Will Trent	"This Kid's Gonna Be Alright"
2025	Sheriff Country	"Exit Interview"
2025	Sheriff Country	"Glory Days"
2026	Brilliant Minds	"The Invisible Man"
2026	Will Trent	"The Man From Nowhere"
2026	Will Trent	"Where'd You Come From, Little Angel?"
2026	R.J. Decker	"In Vanity Venitas"

=== Producer ===
- Thin Line (co-produced with Janis Cole) (1977)
- Starship Invasions (1977; assistant producer)
- Plague (1978)
- P4W: Prison for Women (co-produced with Janis Cole) (1981)
- Hookers on Davie (co-produced with Janis Cole) (1984)
- Calling the Shots (co-produced with Janis Cole) (1988)

== Awards and nominations ==
Year	Name of the Award	Awarding Institution	Name of Film or Television Series	Status
1981	Gold Hugo: Best Documentary	Chicago International Film Festival	P4W: Prison for Women	Nominated
1982	Genie Award: Best Theatrical Documentary	Academy of Canadian Cinema and Television	P4W: Prison for Women	Won
1982	Red Ribbon Award	The American Film Festival	P4W: Prison for Women	Won
1982	Grand Prize: the Best Human Condition	York Film and Video Festival	P4W: Prison for Women	Won
1982	Grand Prize: the Best Cinematography	York Film and Video Festival	P4W: Prison for Women	Won
1984	Theatrical Producers Achievement Award	Canadian Film and Television Association		Nominated
1984	Gold Plaque: Best Documentary	Chicago International Film Festival	Hookers on Davie	Won
1985	Genie Award: Best Theatrical Documentary	Academy of Canadian Cinema and Television	Hookers on Davie	Nominated
1988	Lillian Gish Award	Los Angeles Women in Film Festival	Calling the Shots	Won
1989	Genie Award: Best Feature Length Documentary	Academy of Canadian Cinema and Television	Calling the Shots	Nominated
1994	Toronto Arts Award in Media			Won
1998	Gemini Award: Best Direction in a Dramatic Program or Miniseries	Academy of Canadian Cinema and Television	Dangerous Offender: The Marlene Moore Story	Nominated
2002	DGC Craft Award: Outstanding Achievement in Direction	Directors Guild of Canada	A Nero Wolfe Mystery, "Christmas Party"	Nominated
2003	DGC Craft Award: Outstanding Achievement in Direction	Directors Guild of Canada	Just Cause, "Buried Past"	Won
2003	Gemini Award: Best Direction in Dramatic Series	Academy of Canadian Film and Television	Bliss	Nominated
2008	Gemini Award: Best Direction in Dramatic Series	Academy of Canadian Film and Television	Durham County, "What Lies Beneath"	Won
2008	DGC Team Award: Television Series - Drama	Academy of Canadian Film and Television	Durham County, "What Lies Beneath"	Nominated
2008	DGC Craft Award: Direction - Television Series	Academy of Canadian Film and Television	Durham County, "What Lies Beneath"	Won
2009	DGC Craft Award: Outstanding Achievement in Direction	Directors Guild of Canada	Flashpoint, "Attention Shoppers"	Won
2010	DGC Craft Award: Outstanding Achievement in Direction	Directors Guild of Canada	Flashpoint, "Perfect Storm"	Nominated
2013	DGC Craft Award: Outstanding Achievement in Direction	Directors Guild of Canada	The Firm, "Chapter Eighteen".	Nominated
2017	DGC Team Award: Outstanding Directorial Achievement in Movies for Television and Mini-Series	Directors Guild of Canada	Mary Kills People, "The River Styx"	Won
2018	Best Drama Series	Canadian Screen Awards	Mary Kills People	Nominated
2018	Best Direction, Drama Series	Canadian Screen Awards	Mary Kills People, "The River Styx"	Won
2020	Outstanding Directorial Achievement	Directors Guild of Canada	Transplant, "Pilot"	Won
2021	Best Direction, Drama Series	Canadian Screen Awards	Transplant, "Pilot"	Won

== See also ==
- List of female film and television directors
- List of lesbian filmmakers
- List of LGBT-related films directed by women
