= Hookers on Davie =

1984 Canadian documentary film

- Directed by: Janis Cole; Holly Dale
- Written by: Janis Cole; Holly Dale
- Produced by: Janis Cole; Holly Dale
- Cinematography: Nesya Blue; Paul Mitchnick
- Edited by: Janis Cole; Holly Dale
- Production company: Spectrum Films
- Distributed by: Pan-Canadian Film Distributors
- Release date: April 5, 1984 (Bloor Cinema)
- Running time: 88 minutes
- Country: Canada
- Language: English

Hookers on Davie is a Canadian documentary film, directed by Janis Cole and Holly Dale and released in 1984. A portrait of a number of women, both cisgender and transgender, who work as prostitutes on Davie Street in Vancouver, British Columbia, the film profiles them in the context of the early campaign to "clean up" the street during the mayoralty of Mike Harcourt.

The film premiered at the Bloor Cinema in Toronto, Ontario on April 5, 1984.

The film received a Genie Award nomination for Best Feature Length Documentary at the 6th Genie Awards in 1985. It also won the award for Best Documentary at the 1984 Chicago International Film Festival.
