= Calling the Shots =

1988 Canadian documentary film

- Directed by: Janis Cole; Holly Dale
- Written by: Janis Cole; Holly Dale
- Produced by: Janis Cole; Holly Dale
- Cinematography: Judy Irola; Sandi Sissel; John Walker
- Edited by: Janis Cole
- Music by: Lauri Conger
- Production companies: Cineplex Odeon Films; Women in Cinema
- Distributed by: Cineplex Odeon Films
- Release date: September 8, 1988 (TIFF)
- Running time: 100 minutes
- Country: Canada
- Language: English

Calling the Shots is a Canadian documentary film, directed by Janis Cole and Holly Dale and released in 1988. The film analyzes the changing role of women in the film industry, through the reflections of various female performers and filmmakers.

Figures appearing in the film include Karen Arthur, Lizzie Borden, Joyce Chopra, Euzhan Palcy, Martha Coolidge, Donna Deitch, Margot Kidder, Sherry Lansing, Agnès Varda, Margarethe von Trotta, Anne Wheeler, Sandy Wilson, Mai Zetterling and Jeanne Moreau.

The film premiered on September 8, 1988 at the 1988 Toronto International Film Festival.

The film received a Genie Award nomination for Best Feature Length Documentary at the 10th Genie Awards in 1989.
