= P4W: Prison for Women =

1981 Canadian film

P4W: Prison for Women is a Canadian documentary film, directed by Janis Cole and Holly Dale and released in 1981. The film profiles several female inmates at the Prison for Women of Kingston Penitentiary.

The film premiered at the 1981 Festival of Festivals (now known as the Toronto International Film Festival), and was broadcast by CBC Television in 1982. The film won the Genie Award for Best Feature Length Documentary at the 3rd Genie Awards in 1982.

When the Prison for Women closed in 2000, Cole wrote a piece for the Toronto newspaper Now about her experiences making the film and her hopes for prison reform.
