= Matthew Hays =

Canadian film critic

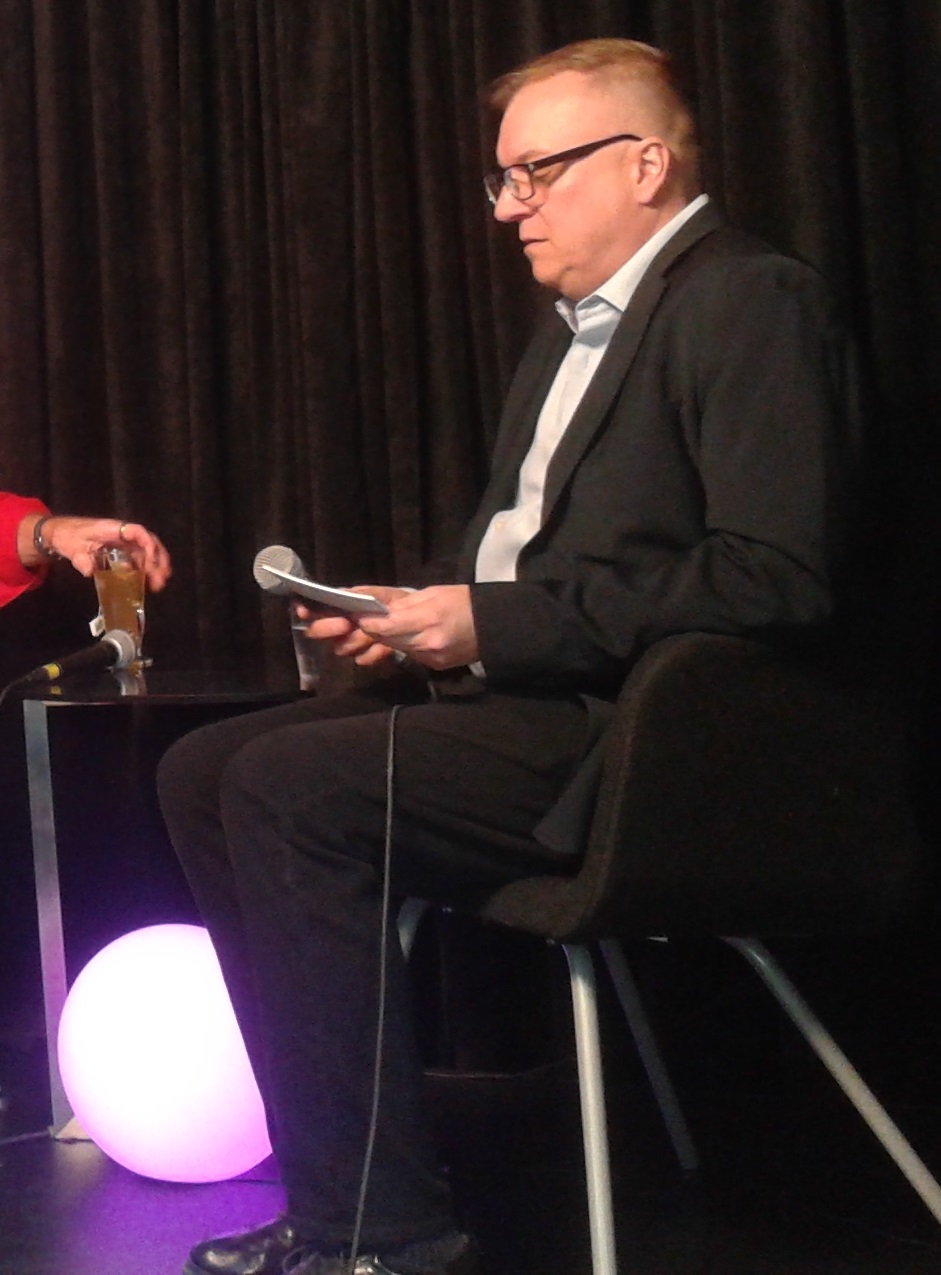
Matthew Hays in Montreal at Never Apart

Matthew Hays is a Canadian film critic, writer, film festival programmer and academic. He won a Lambda Literary Award for his 2007 book The View from Here: Conversations with Gay and Lesbian Filmmakers.

Hays teaches film studies at Concordia University in Montreal, and has also taught cinema at Marianopolis College in Westmount. He worked in various roles for the Montreal Mirror. His writing has also been published in The Globe and Mail, The Guardian, Xtra Magazine, The Walrus, Vice and The Advocate, and he has been a programmer for the Toronto International Film Festival. He was nominated for a 2008 National Magazine Award.

Hays is openly gay.

Hays earned an MA in media studies from Concordia University in 2000.
