= Studio D =

Canadian women's film unit

Studio D (National Film Board of Canada)
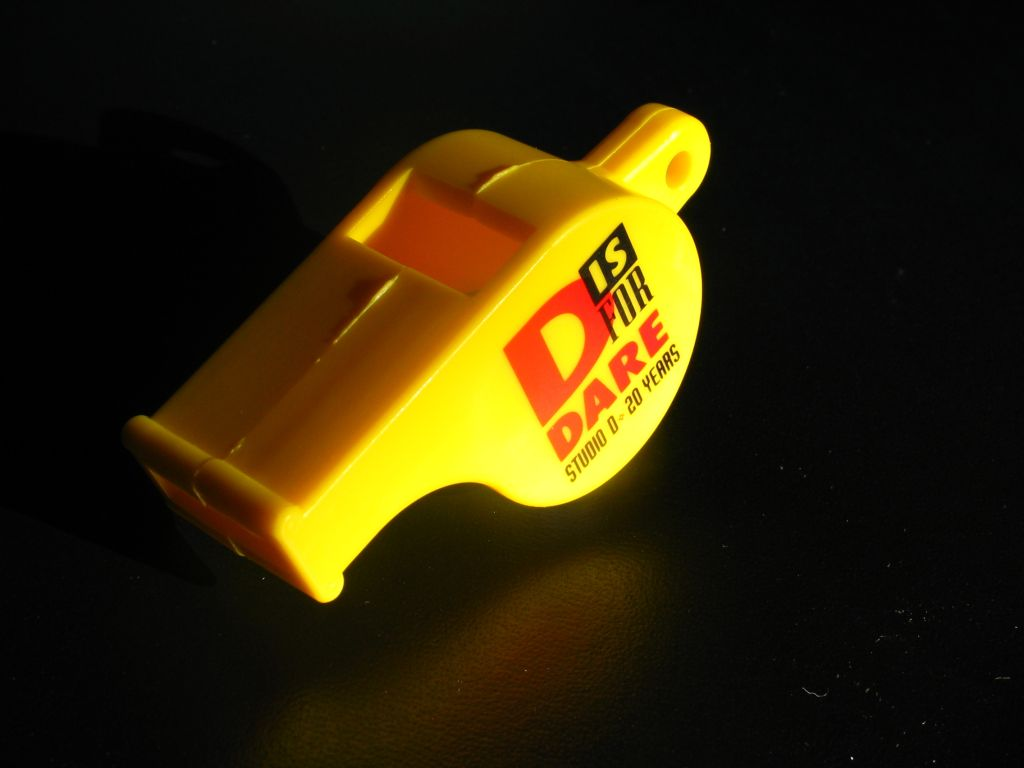
- Founded: 1974
- Founder: Kathleen Shannon
- Defunct: 1996

Studio D was the women's unit of the National Film Board of Canada (NFB) and the world's first publicly funded feminist filmmaking studio. In its 22-year history, it produced over 140 films and won 3 Academy Awards. Cinema Canada once called it the "Jewel in the Crown Corporation."

Many of Canada's most notable women filmmakers passed through Studio D, as employees, freelancers, or trainees, including Bonnie Sherr Klein, Lynne Fernie, and Justine Pimlott. Studio D was also instrumental in training and supporting women in key production roles such as cinematography (including Susan Trow and Zoe Dirse); sound (including Aerlyn Weissman and Jackie Newell); and editing (including Anne Henderson and Ginny Stikeman).

Decades before the #TimesUp movement, Studio D "left an important legacy: a commitment to women's filmmaking and cultural diversity that is now deeply anchored in every studio [at the NFB]."

== Shannon leadership (1974–86) ==
=== Founding ===
Studio D was founded by Kathleen Shannon in 1974. She credits the success of her series, Working Mothers, as well as the En tant que femmes series by Anne Claire Poirier for proving that there was both a market for films about women's issues and women eager for filmmaking careers. The NFB received funding from the Women's Program of the Secretary of State in recognition of the United Nations' International Women's Year, which was split equally between Poirier and Shannon. In the end, Poirier decided against launching a French-language women's unit and the money was used to fund a film already in production. Shannon, however, used the money to launch Studio D. The priorities for Studio D were to provide employment and training opportunities for women, meet the information needs of women, bring women's perspectives to social issues and, as Shannon phrased it, facilitate "exploring our creativity in our own way."

Its first project was a training program for thirty women that resulted in a series of one-minute films woven together as one film under the name Just-a-Minute. It was the first ever "quilt film", a unique genre of collaborative short filmmaking often used by Studio D to stretch budgets and provide training.

At first, Studio D relied on freelancers and the few women already employed by the NFB. The first members were Yuki Yoshida and Margaret Pettigrew, both producers, with Shannon as Executive Producer. Great Grand Mother was the first film released by Studio D, but it had already begun production by independent filmmakers Anne Wheeler and Lorna Rasmussen through their company, Filmwest Associates. A portrayal of early women settlers on the Canadian prairies, it combined interviews, recreations, and voice-over narratives from archival letters and diaries. Shannon recalled, "When we previewed it for the branch program committee, we used some footage of an elder woman, a midwife who also dressed bodies for burial. I thought it was riveting. The head of the committee pronounced it boring."

The films produced in the beginning were very much within the cinema verité tradition of the NFB and its social documentary program Challenge for Change. An emphasis on the recuperation of Canadian's women's history led to the re-release of NFB films from the 1940s and 50s as an educational package called How They Saw Us in 1977. The use of inter-titles to re-contextualize the films from a feminist perspective drew attention to "the evidence of the patriarchal camera eye" of the NFB.

More women joined the Studio, including Challenge for Change veterans Bonnie Sherr Klein (who had left the NFB but returned for the chance to work in an all-woman environment) and Dorothy Todd Hénaut. In 1979, Beverly Shaffer was the first Studio D filmmaker to win an Academy Award for her film, I'll Find a Way, part of the Children of Canada Series. Other early members included Ginny Stikeman, who later became Executive Producer of Studio D, Margaret Wescott, Gloria Demers, Susan Huyke, Margaret Wong, and Signe Johansson. Freelancers who collaborated with Studio D included Anne Henderson, Irene Angelico, Donna Read, Sharon McGowan, and Moira Simpson.

=== Studio success ===
In 1981, Studio D released its first feature-length documentary film, Not a Love Story: A Film About Pornography. Directed by Bonnie Sherr Klein and featuring Lindalee Tracey, it was a foray into various facets of the sex entertainment industry and the intensifying feminist debates about pornography. The film featured interviews with women working at Times Square's notorious Show World Sex Emporium, porn star Marc Stevens ("Mr. 10 1/2"), and Hustler photographer Suze Randall. Critics complained, however, that their voices were drowned out by a cacophony of American anti-porn feminists including Susan Griffin, Robin Morgan, Kate Millett and Kathleen Barry. Many accused the film of being pro-censorship, an irony given that it was censored in both Ontario and Saskatchewan. Not a Love Story was the first Studio D film to receive international theatrical release, including a benefit premiere in New York City for Ms. magazine.

One year later, Studio D again courted controversy with the film If You Love this Planet, directed by Terre Nash. It featured a lecture given by Dr. Helen Caldicott about the immanent dangers of nuclear weapon proliferation. The NFB officer in charge of distribution for the United States warned that the film may harm relations with the Reagan administration, and sought support from Canada's External Affairs office to stop the film's release. The film won the Academy Award for best documentary short in 1982, and its influences can be seen in Al Gore's An Inconvenient Truth.

In 1983, Studio D won its third and last Academy Award for Flamenco at 5:15. Directed by Cynthia Scott, it was a marked departure from the controversy that had swirled around the studio. The film showcased the instructors and senior students in a master class in Flamenco at the National Ballet School of Canada. The New York Times praised it as "a small jewel of a documentary" that demonstrates the leap from studying dance to becoming an artist.

Behind the Veil, a sprawling documentary "which seeks nothing more than to examine critically the history of women in the Christian church of the Western world," provided a rare glimpse into the lives of cloistered and apostolic nuns. Abortion: Stories From North and South was the first Studio D film with an all-women (instead of majority) crew. Documenting women's stories about accessing abortion services in Canada, Columbia, Ireland, Japan, Peru, and Thailand, the film won the Grand Prize at the San Francisco International Film Festival.

Despite such successes, Studio D was not without its critics - including from the wider feminist film community. Its heavy-handed social realism was seen as overly didactic and out of touch with the experimental and political advancements in feminist film theory. In her review of Not a Love Story, Susan Barrowclough outlined the formulaic approach to filmmaking by Studio D: "realist narrative, cinema verité, and underlying moral didactism, claim and counter-claim all sewn up and closed with a reassuring voice-over." Critics frequently referenced its "standard meta-narrative of women's oppression." Janis Cole and Holly Dale recalled Shannon insisting that their film, Hookers on Davie, focus only on women forced into sex work and cut out trans workers. Their refusal to conform to Studio D's "bourgeois norms" and victim narrative resulted in them pulling the film from the studio and completing it independently.

Studio D's training and internship programs helped build women filmmakers in all areas of production. In 1984 it brought 20 women age 18-25 for a nine-month intensive residency funded by the Secretary of State's International Youth Year Secretariat. The films Beyond Memory (dir. Louise Lamarre), First Take Double Take (dir. Paula Fairfield), and Thin Dreams (dir. Susie Mah) were produced by this program. A year later, a new internship program made possible films such as D.E.S.: An Uncertain Legacy (dir. Sidonie Kerr), The Impossible Takes a Little Longer (dir. Anne Henderson), and Spirit of the Kata (dir. Sharon McGowan).

Smaller budget films were produced within Studio D by the Federal Women's Film Program. Launched in 1980, it was a unique partnership with various federal government departments to produce documentaries about women's issues that were identified as government priorities. These included women's labor participation (Women and Work Series), Indigenous women's leadership (Doctor, Lawyer, Indian Chief), gender-based violence (The Next Step Series), women in agriculture (Gathering Strength Series) and women and aging (When the Day Comes, The Power of Time, and Pills Unlimited). The program was the only one in the studio to require versions of the films in both official languages (English and French). In 1986, the newly formed Regards de femmes program in the NFB's French studio joined the initiative.

=== Budget reductions ===
By the mid-eighties, Studio D was receiving a budget on par with the other studios, but it was still not enough to respond to the steady requests from women across the country for more training and financial support. It didn't help that other studios – including regional offices – sent women to Studio D to protect their own budgets. Furthermore, while other studios within NFB could rely on in-house crew members, Studio D had a heavier contract budget in order to hire more women. In 1980, only 30 women held full-time technical positions within the NFB. By 1986, the number shrunk to 23, compared to 130 men.

Despite Shannon's lobbying for more funds, it was the only English filmmaking studio to have its budget cut in 1984. Its overall share of the NFB budget dropped to 6% in 1986. The Federal Women's Film Program was cancelled two years later. However, NFB's five-year plan promised to "allocate increased resources to women's filmmakers and … maintain its support of Studio D, the women's film unit, enabling it to meet a national mandate." That, coupled with recently passed legislation enshrining employment equity, prompted a public study. Equality and Access: A New Social Contract was the first of what was to be many studies on the lack of opportunities for women at the NFB. It showed that there were more than two times as many men filmmakers as women, and that slightly more than half of all women employed at the NFB were in support staff roles. The newly appointed Employment Equity Director at the NFB also drew attention to the lack of racial, ethnic, and Indigenous diversity within the NFB. However, NFB's Commissioner, François Macerola claimed that he was "not ready for an employment equity program involving the disabled, natives and visible minorities" and would maintain focus on women for the foreseeable future. At the same time, he criticized Studio D in his report to the House of Commons Standing Committee on Culture and Communication, and declared that he was deliberately holding back funds to them. "First of all, I think Studio D is very important. Nevertheless, it is presenting only one point of view. What I am planning to do is really to open the place to women at the NFB. I want to have more and more films produced by women for women. [What] I mean by that [is] that I will not give all the financial resources to Studio D."

The NFB created the Women's Film Development Group, originally made up of marketing managers hired into the regional studios to promote Studio D films, implement training programs, and recruit women filmmakers. The benefits of this initiative led to the launch of regional feminist film festivals such as herland Feminist Film Festival in Calgary and the St. John's International Women's Film Festival. Early programming for these festivals relied heavily on Studio D films. Bonnie Thompson, of the NorthWest Studio in Edmonton, recalls, "It was so radical for women to see themselves." Despite these advances across the country, Studio D was under fire both within the NFB, which kept cutting its budget, and from independent and grassroots feminist filmmakers who demanded more resources without having to go through Studio D. In October 1986, Shannon resigned as Executive Producer, although she continued with Studio D as a producer. Ginny Stikeman was appointed Interim Executive Producer until Rina Fraticelli took over the role in March 1987.

== Fraticelli leadership (1987–90) ==
At the time of her appointment as Executive Producer in 1987, Rina Fraticelli was not a filmmaker, but a dramaturge and community organizer. Her pan-national networks were expected to bring fresh insights to Studio D, especially "women who represent the diversity of points of view within the women's movement." With a slashed budget and a slate of unfinished films by resident filmmakers, her first year proved challenging.

By the mid-1980s, Canada's women's movement was confronting its own internalized racism and homophobia. Studio D was distanced from some of the more acrimonious debates because of their status and location within the NFB, on the outskirts of Montreal. Although its members were committed feminists, "we really weren't a part of anything except for our world," Klein later acknowledged. Studio D's staff had remained virtually unchanged since its beginning, raising concerns by Fraticelli about "a conflict between fully employing staff filmmakers and the need to extend our accessibility in the women's community.

In 1989, with the support of Kathleen Shannon, Fraticelli transferred the remaining six resident Studio D filmmakers to other NFB units: Bonnie Sherr Klein (who, at that time was on long-term disability), Dorothy Todd Hénaut, Margaret Wescott, Susan Huycke, Cynthia Scott, and Beverly Shaffer. Shannon remained in her reduced role as producer. The goal was to expand Studio D's financial reach to support women of colour and other marginalized filmmakers across the country. "Instead of working to maintain and protect the work of a privileged few, Studio D had attempted and would continue to attempt to expand the rights of all." By that time, the budget had been reduced from $1 million to $795,000, much of it tied to salaries. Despite the fact that the filmmakers remained employees of the NFB, and the public message was that it was a mutual decision, many spoke off the record of being "turfed out." With the exception of Shannon, none of the original resident filmmakers directed a film for Studio D again.

In the place of resident filmmakers came a new generation of artists from across the country. While only seventeen films were released during Fraticelli's tenure, among them were Shaffer's last film for Studio D (in production prior to Fraticelli's appointment), the groundbreaking documentary on child sexual abuse, To a Safer Place, and Gail Singer's short excerpt from Abortion: Stories From North and South, A Mother and Daughter on Abortion, which renewed public criticism of Studio D by REAL Women of Canada. Fraticelli had brokered an innovative partnership with renowned poet Dionne Brand to develop a series of films on Black Canadian women's experiences, called Women at the Well, and spearheaded Five Feminist Minutes, a continuation of Studio D's practice of "quilt films", which screened at most feminist film festivals across the country. Arguably her most significant contribution to Studio D was the launch of the New Initiatives in Film program, which had been initiated by Ginny Stikeman who dedicated herself to mentoring new filmmakers. Co-created with independent filmmaker Sylvia Hamilton, the program's mandate was to provide filmmaking opportunities to women of colour and First Nations women. Fraticelli had ambitions to break with the in-house style that was heavily influenced by Shannon's aversion to artistic or experimental documentary. "As far as I was concerned, we had the right to be artists, not just social workers," Fraticelli explains. "I wanted these women filmmakers to challenge the form of filmmaking, as well as the context, and I think other women at the studio had a problem with this."

Despite Fraticelli's advancement of both diversity and artistry within Studio D, she faced insurmountable challenges. She was accused of "brutal behaviour," by past members of Studio D, and frustrated by the NFB's budget cutting and broken promises which ricocheted into criticism by independent filmmakers that they were not being given the opportunities she allegedly promised. She left in March 1990. Two years later, Shannon retired.

== Stikeman leadership (1990–96) ==
Rina Fraticelli's parting words as she left Studio D was to warn that the NFB was "slowly dying away." It was left to Ginny Stikeman, one of the original members of Studio D, to oversee the long decline and eventual closure of the women's unit as the last of its Executive Producers. Fraticelli had laid the groundwork for some of the Studio's most ambitious films but it was Stikeman's experience as an editor and producer that shepherded them to completion. In particular, Stikeman played an instrumental role in seeing two controversial feature-length films completed: Forbidden Love: The Unashamed Stories of Lesbian Lives and Studio D's only dramatic feature, Skin Deep, about a trans man's obsessive relationship with a lesbian filmmaker. Also produced under Stikeman was Singer's feature-length documentary Wisecracks, about women comedians, which was called "ahead of its time." Stikeman continued to oversee New Initiatives in Film, which was frequently embroiled in interpersonal conflicts and accusations of institutional racism.

=== New Initiatives in Film (1990–1996) ===
New Initiatives in Film was envisioned as a multi-year funded program along the lines of the Federal Women's Film Program, but the NFB would only commit to one year at a time, with increasingly limited funds. Furthermore, filmmakers were hired only on short-term contracts. NIF was only supposed to represent Studio D's contribution to a NFB-wide effort to improve racial and ethnic diversity but under Macerola it became the only program, further stretching its budget. A 1997 report Diversity On and Off the Screen claimed, "year after year NIF was the only thing NFB management had to show." The month before Fraticelli resigned was the first time in its history that the National Film Board recognized Black History Month. It had only two films to screen: Black Mother Black Daughter, by NIF co-creator Hamilton and NIF producer Claire Prieto, which won the 1990 NFB Kathleen Shannon Award; and Older, Stronger, Wiser, by Prieto.

NIF offered multiple services and programs: workshop institutes for aspiring but untrained filmmakers, longer in-house internships for artists to complete a film, and post-production support to established filmmakers. In addition, it developed a resource bank of filmmakers and production personnel in Canada who were either Indigenous or women of colour. Unfortunately, the program was rife with interpersonal conflicts. By 1994, acrimony had spilled out into the wider film community. A brief exposé of NIF claimed it was "another example of cultural ghettoization, that instead of including marginalized groups in the mainstream, NIF represents how factionalized and segregated our society has become."

Their first program coordinator, Reneé Du Plessis, herself a light-skinned woman of colour originally from South Africa, was fired and subsequently sued the NFB (the case was settled out of court). "I was accused by the advisory board and Studio D of being inflexible and insensitive to women of colour. I was also accused of contributing to systemic racism," Du Plessis says. "Apparently, I contributed to systemic racism because I didn't let them do what they wanted to do. There wasn't much time, and some of these women (who had never been to Montreal) wanted to go shopping." Many NIF trainees were leaving NFB headquarters to receive support and mentoring from Montreal-based filmmakers who were more encouraging of experimental and political documentary filmmaking. In response to Du Plessis' criticism, they spoke anonymously (because Studio D "was the only game in town"), complaining that, "Studio D hasn't progressed in the last 20 years. They've been making the same damn films that carry the same message: women are victims. At first, white women made them, now they're getting women of colour to make the same thing."

Despite criticisms of structural and cultural racism, the New Initiatives in Film series brought to light both emergent filmmakers and heretofore untold stories. The Women at the Well series by Dionne Brand was among the most high-profile venture by NIF. Already an internationally heralded poet, Brand co-directed Sisters in the Struggle (1992) with Stikeman, and solo directed Long Time Comin' (1993). In 1996, she made one last film with Studio D, Listening for Something: Adrienne Rich and Dionne Brand in Conversation. NIF also oversaw the production of Michelle Wong's Return Home (1992) and Doris Nipp's Under the Willow Tree, both explorations of Chinese immigrant women. Loretta Todd's film Hands of History (1994) was a lush profile of four major Indigenous feminist artists, including Jane Ash Poitras. Norma Bailey's Women Under Shadows (1991) traced Métis filmmaker Christine Welsh's journey to discover her Indigenous great grandmother, Margaret Taylor, who was the consort to Hudson's Bay Company Governor George Simpson. Welsh herself directed Keepers of the Fire (1994), about Indigenous women land defenders.

=== Studio D's closure (1996) ===
In March 1996, the NFB announced that it would be closing down Studio D. By that time, it had already released most of its filmmakers from all other studios (Shaffer was among three in-house directors left). The plan was to end the studio structure and replace it with production streams so that NFB films would no longer be made in-house but in partnership with independent artists and production companies. While a documentary production stream would continue, the NFB decided against a women's stream. Production had been slowly grinding to a halt in Studio D. Skin Deep was its only release in 1995. Seven films were rushed to completion before the studio ended, with some Studio D productions like Margaret Wescott's sprawling documentary on three centuries of lesbian life, Stolen Moments and Gerry Rogers' moving portrait Kathleen Shannon: On Film, Feminism and Other Dreams, finally released one year later.

Kathleen Shannon publicly criticized the move: "This a loss of a perspective that's different from the corporate culture. Because when we never see our own perceptions validated - most of us are too afraid to speak up. It seems so, particularly right now - we're in this stranglehold that corporations have on us, and it's extremely important for us to have some validation and empowerment." Gail Singer also spoke out against the decision: "This is not a wise decision, but I think it is almost inevitable in the current, careless mood of cutbacks." Others warned that cutting Studio D just at the point where filmmaking equity had just been met within the NFB would send it backwards. However, others in the feminist film community felt that Studio D was no longer relevant. Barbara Janes, the NFB's Director-General of English Programming, stated adamantly at the time, "Studio D had been in existence for twenty years. In that time, society changed a lot. But Studio D kept the mindset of 1975, fighting battles already won." Some suggested Studio D had turned into "a kind of ghetto for women at the NFB, left behind in the 1980's move into the production of more high-profile feature films."

== Legacy ==
In 2016, the NFB announced a new gender parity initiative in response to successive annual reports by Women in View on inequity in Canadian film and television. While its president, Claude Joli-Coeur, insisted that director and producer credits were near parity, he acknowledged that production personnel statistics were much worse, with women representing only 24% of editors and 12% of cinematographers. The NFB claimed they were uniquely situated to meet an ambitious target of full parity in credits and funding by 2020 because they were "a Canadian film industry leader in gender equality that made history in 1974 when it established Studio D, the world's first production unit devoted exclusively to work by women filmmakers." By 2023, the NFB reported that "63% of all ongoing projects at the NFB (254) were directed by women or by teams with equal or greater representation of women than men."

In a 2017 article for Time magazine, film critic Matthew Hays suggested Hollywood look north to solve its gender problem. He claimed that Studio D films "remain vital, fresh and pertinent, and in many cases were films made by first-time directors. They prove that when a space is carved out for women to pursue filmmaking, they can succeed on their own terms, and create cinema that is distinct, powerful and every bit as full of creative ideas as films made by men." The 2019 Hot Docs Festival in Toronto featured a retrospective of Studio D films, and a revival of Five Feminist Minutes, called Five Feminist Minutes 2019. It also hosted a Doc Summit, "Dare to Be Studio D" in which contemporary filmmakers Ann Marie Fleming, Alexandra Lazarowich, and Glace Lawrence shared the stage with Studio D alumni Zoe Dirse, Rina Fraticelli and Gail Singer, as well as NFB Executive Director Michelle Van Beusekom. It was billed as an opportunity to "revisit the studio's monumental impact on feminist film culture and look to the future of inclusive, diverse docs that implement social change in Canada."

Studio D was far from the only feminist film organization in Canada, and some contemporary assessments argue that its prominence overshadows the work of grassroots collectives like the Isis Women and Film Festival that toured eighteen cities in 1974. Beginning in 1972, feminist media collectives such as Reelfeelings and Groupe Intervention Vidéo were not only screening films in community settings but also engaging in guerilla film tactics such as occupations. At least seven different feminist film and video collectives and festivals launched in 1973.

Many argue that its institutional foundation and Shannon's own feminist ideology prevented it from taking more aesthetic and political risks, particularly in its explorations of race and sexual identity, until very late. Such criticism raises questions about the fraught dynamics between feminist activism and state funding. Nonetheless, more Studio D films are being brought back into circulation through a dedicated NFB Channel of "these enduring gems of feminist filmmaking."

== Studio D filmography ==
Year	Film	Series	Duration	Director
1974	It's Not Enough	Working Mothers	15m57s	Kathleen Shannon
1974	Like The Trees	Working Mothers	14m30s	Kathleen Shannon
1974	Luckily I Need Little Sleep	Working Mothers	07m38s	Kathleen Shannon
1974	Mothers Are People	Working Mothers	07m18s	Kathleen Shannon
1974	The Spring and Fall of Nina Polanski	Working Mothers	05m56s	Joan Hutton, Louise Roy
1974	They Appreciate You More	Working Mothers	14m42s	Kathleen Shannon
1974	Tiger on a Tight Leash	Working Mothers	07m35s	Kathleen Shannon
1974	Would I Ever Like to Work	Working Mothers	08m53s	Kathleen Shannon
1975	"…And They Lived Happily Ever After"	Working Mothers	13m07s	Kathleen Shannon, Irene Angelico, Anne Henderson
1975	Our Dear Sisters		14m40s	Kathleen Shannon
1975	Great Grand Mother		28m47s	Anne Wheeler, Lorna Rasmussen
1975	My Friends Call Me Tony	Children of Canada	12m07s	Beverly Shaffer
1975	My Name is Susan Yee	Children of Canada	12m18s	Beverly Shaffer
1976	Just-a-minute		07m05s	Mary Aitkin, Mary Daemen, Tina Horne, Joan Hutton, Sharon Madden, Terre Nash, Margaret Pettigrew, Patricia Robertson, Candace Savage
1976	Maud Lewis: A World Without Shadows		10m01S	Diane Beaudry
1977	Beautiful Lennard Island	Children of Canada	23m45s	Beverly Shaffer
1977	Gurdeep Singh Bains	Children of Canada	11m55s	Beverly Shaffer
1977	I'll Find a Way	Children of Canada	25m47s	Beverly Shaffer
1977	Kevin Alec	Children of Canada	16m28s	Beverly Shaffer
1977	Veronica	Children of Canada	14m13s	Beverly Shaffer
1977	Careers and Cradles	How They Saw Us	11m07s	Anne Pearson
1977	Is It a Woman's World?	How They Saw Us	29m20s	Anne Pearson
1977	Needles and Pins	How They Saw Us	10m55s	Anne Pearson
1977	Proudly She Marches	How They Saw Us	18m27s	Anne Pearson
1977	Service in the Sky	How They Saw Us	9m48s	Anne Pearson
1977	Wings on Her Shoulder	How They Saw Us	11m07s	Anne Pearson
1977	Women at War	How They Saw Us	10m23s	Anne Pearson
1977	The Lady from Grey County		26m13s	Janice Brown
1977	Some American Feminists		55m51s	Luce Guilbeault, Nicole Brossard, Margaret Wescott
1978	Benoît	Children of Canada	20m23s	Beverly Shaffer
1978	Eve Lambart		51m40s	Margaret Wescott
1978	Patricia's Moving Picture		25m50s	Bonnie Sherr Klein
1978	Sun, Wind and Wood		24m30s	Dorothy Todd Hénaut
1978	An Unremarkable Birth		52m22s	Diane Beaudry
1979	Prairie Album		14m47s	Blake James
1979	The Right Candidate for Rosedale		32m52s	Bonnie Sherr Klein, Anne Henderson
1979	Sea Dream		05m31s	Ellen Besen
1980	Boys Will Be Men		29m07s	Donald Rennick
1980	[Just a Lady		21m20s	Susan Trow
1980	Laila		10m33s	Diane Beaudry
1980	Rusting World		06m17s	Laurent Coderre
1980	The Town Mouse and the Country Mouse		05m25s	Evelyn Lambart
1981	Julie O'Brien	Children of Canada	18m52s	Beverly Shaffer
1981	Louise Drouin, Veterinarian		21m37s	Margaret Wescott
1981	Not a Love Story: A Film About Pornography		68m40s	Bonnie Sherr Klein
1982	Four Centuries: The Firearm in Canada		26m52s	Joan Henson
1982	If You Love This Planet		25m50s	Terre Nash
1982	It's Just Better	Children of Canada	15m23s	Beverly Shaffer
1982	Portrait of the Artist - As An Old Lady		27m03s	Gail Singer
1982	The Way It Is		24m13s	Beverly Shaffer
1983	Attention: Women at Work!		28m20s	Anne Henderson
1983	Dream of a Free Country: A Message from Nicaraguan Women		59m50s	Kathleen Shannon, Ginny Stikeman
1983	Flamenco at 5:15		29m22s	Cynthia Scott
1983	I Want to Be An Engineer		28m34s	Beverly Shaffer
1984	Abortion: Stories from North and South		54m50s	Gail Singer
1984	Adele and the Ponies of Ardmore		13m48s	Char Davies
1984	Behind the Veil: Nuns		130m04s	Margaret Wescott
1984	Head Start: Meeting the Computer Challenge		27m25s	Diane Beaudry
1984	On Our Own		26m30s	Laurette Deschamps
1984	This Borrowed Land		28m49s	Bonnie Kreps
1984	Too Dirty for a Woman		16m52s	Diane Beaudry
1984	The Treadmill		43m02s	Dagmur Teufel
1984	Turnaround: A Story of Recovery		46m42s	Moira Simpson
1984	Waterwalker		86m38s	Bill Mason
1985	The Best Time of My Life: Portraits of Women in Midlife		58m35s	Patricia Watson
1985	Dark Lullabies		81m20s	Irene Angelico, Abbey Jack Neidik
1985	DES: An Uncertain Legacy		54m47s	Bonnie Andrukaitis, Sidonie Ker
1985	Speaking Our Peace	Speaking Our Peace	55m19s	Terre Nash, Bonnie Sherr Klein
1985	Spirit of the Kata		27m28s	Sharon McGowan
1985	A Writer in the Nuclear Age	Speaking Our Peace	09m10s	Terre Nash
1986	Beyond Memory		14m15s	Louise Lamarre
1986	Children of War		25m20s	Premika Ratnam
1986	Doctor, Lawyer, Indian Chief		28m42s	Carol Geddes
1986	Firewords: Louky Bersianik, Jovette Marchessault, Nicole Brossard		84m35s	Dorothy Todd Hénaut
1986	First Take Double Take		08m47s	Paula Fairfield
1986	The Impossible Takes a Little Longer		45m35s	Anne Henderson
1986	Moving On	The Next Step	28m02s	Tina Horne
1986	No Longer Silent		56m28s	Laurette Deschamps
1986	Nuclear Addiction: Dr. Rosalie Burtell on the Cost of Deterrence	Speaking Our Peace	18m47s	Terre Nash
1986	A Safe Distance	The Next Step	27m40s	Tina Horne
1986	Speaking of Nairobi		56m08s	Tina Horne
1986	Sylvie's Story	The Next Step	27m43s	Tina Horne
1986	Thin Dreams		20m38s	Susue Mah
1987	The Legacy of Mary McEwan		55m40s	Patricia Watson
1987	A Love Affair with Politics: A Portrait of Marion Dewar	Speaking Our Peace	26m45s	Terre Nash
1987	The Man Who Stole Dreams		11m01s	Joyce Borenstein
1987	A Mother and Daughter on Abortion		12m25s	Gail Singer
1987	To a Safer Place		58m20s	Beverly Shaffer
1987	Worth Every Minute		28m27s	Catherine Macleod, Lorraine Segato
1988	Mile Zero: The SAGE Tour		48m41s	Bonnie Sherr Klein
1989	15th Anniversary		57m16s	Sidonie Kerr
1989	Adam's World		19m07s	Donna Read
1989	Goddess Remembered	Women and Spirituality	54m29s	Donna Read
1989	Half the Kingdom		58m45s	Francine E. Zuckerman, Roushell Goldstein
1989	Illuminated Lives		05m51s	Ellen Besen
1989	In Her Chosen Field	Gathering Strength	28m04s	Barbara Evans
1989	Older, Stronger, Wiser	Women at the Well	27m59s	Claire Prieto
1989	Russian Diary	Speaking Our Peace	27m17s	Terre Nash, Bonnie Sherr Klein
1989	Studio D: 15 Years in the Making		04m21s	Janice Brown
1989	A Time to Reap	Gathering Strength	28m05s	Dagmur Teufel
1989	Unnatural Causes		06m45s	Maureen Judge
1989	Working Nights		19m52s	Sarah Butterfield
1990	After the Montreal Massacre		27m14s	Gerry Rogers
1990	The Burning Times	Women and Spirituality	56m10s	Donna Read
1990	Fair Trade	African Market Women	26m57s	Barbara Doran
1990	The Famine Within		118m30s	Katherine Gilday
1990	Five Feminist Minutes		113m40s	Marie Annharte Baker, Kim Blain, Lorna Boschman, Christene Browne, Alison Burns, Janis Cole, Shawna Dempsey, Ann Marie Fleming, Angèle Gagnon, Gwendolyn, Jennifer Kawaja, Frances Leeming, Sook-Yin Lee, Mary Lewis, Catherine Martin, Lorri Millan, Michelle Mohabeer, Violet McNaughton, Andrée Pelletier, Cathy Quinn, Tracy Traeger
1990	Fragments of a Conversation of a Language		19m	Nora Alleyn
1990	From the Shore	African Market Women	15m57s	Barbara Doran
1990	Gathering Together	The Faithful Women	53m07s	Kathleen Shannon
1990	Harmony and Balance	The Faithful Women	53m40s	Kathleen Shannon
1990	I'll Never Forget You	The Faithful Women	53m05s	Kathleen Shannon
1990	No Time to Stop		29m05s	Helene Klodawsky
1990	Pills Unlimited		28m44s	Sylvie van Brabant
1990	The Power of Time		28m44s	Liette Aubin
1990	Priorities and Perspectives	The Faithful Women	53m15s	Kathleen Shannon
1990	Texts and Contexts	The Faithful Women	53m14s	Kathleen Shannon
1990	Through Ignorance or Design: A Discussion of Stereotypes	The Faithful Women	53m05s	Kathleen Shannon
1990	Toying With Their Future		30m04s	Claire Nadon
1990	Where Credit is Due	African Market Women	27m38s	Barbara Doran
1990	Working Towards Peace	The Faithful Women	53m25s	Kathleen Shannon
1991	Mother Earth		10m33s	Terre Nash
1991	Sisters in the Struggle	Women at the Well	49m20s	Dionne Brand, Ginny Stikeman
1991	When the Day Comes		28m27s	Sharon McGowan
1991	Wisecracks		92m58s	Gail Singer
1991	Women in the Shadows		55m55s	Norma Bailey
1992	A Balancing Act	Women and Work	23m43s	Helena Cynamon
1992	Forbidden Love: The Unashamed Stories of Lesbian Lives		84m35s	Lynne Fernie, Aerlyn Weissman
1992	Glass Ceiling	Women and Work	27m30s	Sophie Bisonette
1992	Making Babies	On the Eighth Day: Perfecting Mother Nature	50m50s	Gwynne Basen
1992	Making Perfect Babies	On the Eighth Day: Perfecting Mother Nature	50m50s	Gwynne Basen
1992	Return Home		29m19s	Michelle Wong
1992	Toward Intimacy		61m46s	Debbie McGee
1993	Careers to Discover		25m28s	Ginette Pellerin
1993	Long Time Comin'	Women at the Well	52m27s	Dionne Brand
1993	A Web Not a Ladder	Women and Work	23m55s	Bonnie Dickie
1994	Hands of History		51m43s	Loretta Todd
1994	Keepers of the Fire		54m42s	Christine Welsh
1994	Motherland: Tales of Wonder		89m45s	Helene Klodawsky
1994	Twenty Years of Feminist Filmmaking		05m05s	Cheryl Sim, Janice Brown
1994	When Women Kill		47m58s	Barbara Doran
1994	Widening the Circle: A Gathering of Women		25m13s	Annette Clarke, Patricia Diaz, Danielle Dyson, Nicole Hubert, Barbara Hutchinson, Cheryl Sim
1995	Skin Deep		80m59s	Midi Onodera
1996	Alternate Route		45m	Denise Withers
1996	Asking Different Questions: Women and Science		51m	Gwynne Basen, Erna Buffie
1996	The Dreams of the Night Cleaners		46m30s	Leila Sujir
1996	Kathleen Shannon: On Film, Feminism & Other Dreams		49m50s	Gerry Rogers
1996	Listening for Something		55m58s	Dionne Brand
1996	Taking Charge		25m34s	Claudette Jaiko
1996	Under the Willow Tree		51m39s	Dora Nipp
