= Five Feminist Minutes =

- Directed by: Christene Browne; Michelle Mohabeer; Elaine Pain; Gwendolyn; Marie Annharte Baker; Tracy Traeger; Shawna Dempsey and Lorri Millan; Ann Marie Fleming; Sook-Yin Lee; Kim Blain and Lorna Boschman; Catherine Martin; Alison Burns; Mary Lewis; Janis Cole; Cathy Quinn and Frances Leeming; Angèle Gagnon and Jennifer Kawaja; Andrée Pelletier
- Produced by: Mary Armstrong; Nicole Hubert
- Starring: Chloé Cinq-Mars (segment "Petit drame dans la vie d'une femme")
- Production company: Studio D National Film Board of Canada
- Distributed by: National Film Board of Canada
- Release date: 1990
- Running time: 113 minutes 40 second (compiled)
- Country: Canada
- Languages: English; French

Five Feminist Minutes is a Canadian short film anthology released in 1990 by the National Film Board of Canada. The films were produced independently for the 15th anniversary of Studio D of the National Film Board of Canada in collaboration with Regards de Femmes and other NFB production studios in Canada.

It consists of sixteen shorts with an approximately five minute duration for each. Every short has its own director(s) and staff and range across a multitude of genres.

== Production ==
In 1989, The NFB announced that it would be accepting ideas for short films from female film-makers. Finalists were to receive $10,000 and five rolls of film and free developing services and the loan of NFB equipment. In an interview with Mary Armstrong, a Studio D producer, she explains that "We're on the lookout for women who have good ideas, the determination to make films and the ingenuity to see a film through to completion." Admissions were desired from both established and new contributors in the film industry from all regions of Canada including representation of cultural minorities and the disabled community.

== Release ==
Five Feminist Minutes was initially released at the Montreal Women's Film Festival in May 1990.

== Segments ==
- "No Choice" directed by Christene Browne: a documentary following various low income mothers discussing their experience with government aid, status in society, and living conditions as well as opinions regarding child care and abortion.
- "Exposure" directed by Michelle Mohabeer: a documentary profiling two Canadian homosexual women of African and Asian descent sharing their experiences with marginalization and identity in light of sexuality and ethnicity in a face to face conversation.
- "A Letter from Violet" directed by Elaine Pain: a historical overview of the Canadian women's suffrage movement in Saskatchewan in the early 20th century from the narrative perspective of Violet McNaughton.
- "Prowling by Night" directed by Gwendolyn: an animation exploring prostitution in the West End neighbourhood of Parkdale in Toronto, Canada. The film utilizes the voices of real sex workers as well as puppets they have made and describes experiences ranging from encouraging safe sex to dealings with corrupt police officers.
- "Too Tough" directed by Marie Annharte Baker: a voice-over performance of the poem "Being on the Moon" played over re-enactment footage of First Nations women dedicated to women in recovery programs and those experiencing racial and sexual violence.
- "We're Talking Vulva" directed by Tracy Traeger, Shawna Dempsey and Lorri Millan: a comedic music video about the female anatomy.
- "New Shoes: An Interview in Exactly Five Minutes" directed by Ann Marie Fleming: a talking head interview inter-cut with staged footage telling the story of the relationship and separation of a couple ending with an attempted murder and subsequent suicide of an ex-boyfriend.
- "Escapades of the One Particular Mr. Noodle" directed by Sook-Yin Lee: a semi-autobiographical comedy following the experiences of and narrated by Sook-Yin Lee, a Chinese Canadian from Lynn Valley, British Columbia, from her upbringing to her obsession with a restaurant mascot costume.
- "Family Secrets" directed by Kim Blain and Lorna Boschman: a story told through narration and voice-over dialogue about sexual abuse in a family.
- "Shirley Bear" directed by Catherine Martin: a documentary profile of Canadian First Nations artist Shirley Bear discussing her artistic process and philosophies.
- "Let's Rap!" directed by Alison Burns: a rap music video performed by women of various ages and ethnic groups about women's issues.
- "Come into my Parlour" directed by Mary Lewis: tells the story of Anne Murphy from the perspective of various narrators with a personal relationship with her, a spinster with an eccentric personality illustrated with a mixture of animation, still photography, and live action.
- "Shaggie: Letters from Prison" directed by Janis Cole: follows the story of Marlene Moore and her experience in the Prison for Women documented by letters she wrote until her suicide on December 3, 1988.
- "The Untilled Story" directed by Cathy Quinn and Frances Leeming: a discussion of the limited role of women in the workplace metaphorically depicted by the experiment of a female scientist growing flowers.
- "Rhéa" directed by Angèle Gagnon and Jennifer Kawaja
- "Petit drame dans la vie d'une femme" directed by Andrée Pelletier

== Critical reception ==
The Calgary Herald gave the film 3 out of 5 stars describing it as an "extremely mixed bag" given its range of style and content.

The segment Shaggie: Letters from Prison won the Toronto International Film Festival Award for Best Canadian Short Film at the 1990 Toronto International Film Festival. Ann Marie Fleming's New Shoes received an honorable mention for the same award.

== Awards ==
BLIZZARD Award - for Best Music Video (We're Talking Vulva)

The BLIZZARDS/Manitoba Motion Picture Ind. Ass. Film & Video Awards

February 12, 1993, Winnipeg - Canada

Award for First Short Film (Prowling by Night) - with a cash prize of $1,000

La Mondiale de films et vidéos réalisés par des femmes

April 17 to 28 1991, Québec - Canada

Moonsnail Award - Category: Short Documentary (Minoon Minoon)

FIN: Atlantic International Film Festival

September 25 to 30 1990, Halifax - Canada
