= 1990 Toronto International Film Festival =

Annual Canadian film festival

- Festival poster
- Location: Toronto, Ontario, Canada
- Hosted by: Toronto International Film Festival Group
- Festival date: September 6, 1990–September 15, 1990
- Language: English
- Website: tiff.net
- 1991 1989

The 15th Toronto International Film Festival (TIFF) took place in Toronto, Canada between September 6 and September 15, 1990. Gerald Pratley introduced Cinematheque Ontario now known as TIFF Cinematheque at the festival, when the festival assumed management of the Ontario Film Institute.

== Awards ==
Award	Film	Director
People's Choice Award	Cyrano de Bergerac	Jean-Paul Rappeneau
Best Canadian Feature Film	H	Darrell Wasyk
Best Canadian Short Film	Shaggie: Letters from Prison	Janis Cole
International Critics' Award	An Angel at My Table	Jane Campion

== Programme ==
=== Gala Presentation ===
- Cyrano de Bergerac by Jean-Paul Rappeneau
- An Angel at My Table by Jane Campion
- Open Doors by Gianni Amelio
- The Match Factory Girl by Aki Kaurismäki
- Reversal of Fortune by Barbet Schroeder
- The Grifters by Stephen Frears
- The Krays by Peter Medak
- ¡Ay Carmela! by Carlos Saura
- Rosencrantz & Guildenstern Are Dead by Tom Stoppard
- The Hot Spot by Dennis Hopper
- The Reflecting Skin by Philip Ridley
- Szürkület by György Fehér
- Paris by Night by David Hare
- O Processo do Rei by João Mário Grilo
- A Tale of Springtime by Éric Rohmer
- White Hunter Black Heart by Clint Eastwood
- The Long Walk Home by Richard Pearce
- Storia di ragazzi e di ragazze by Pupi Avati

=== Canadian Perspective ===
- Archangel by Guy Maddin
- The Company of Strangers by Cynthia Scott
- Defy Gravity by Michael Gibson
- Falling Over Backwards by Mort Ransen
- The Famine Within by Katherine Gilday
- Five Feminist Minutes by Christene Browne, Michelle Mohabeer, Elaine Pain, Gwendolyn, Marie Annharte Baker, Tracy Traeger, Shawna Dempsey and Lorri Millan, Ann Marie Fleming, Sook-Yin Lee, Kim Blain and Lorna Boschman, Catherine Martin, Alison Burns, Mary Lewis, Janis Cole, Cathy Quinn and Frances Leeming, Angèle Gagnon and Jennifer Kawaja and Andrée Pelletier
- Getting Married in Buffalo Jump by Eric Till
- H by Darrell Wasyk
- Hotel Chronicles by Léa Pool
- An Imaginary Tale by André Forcier
- The Moving Statue by Olivier Asselin
- Moody Beach by Richard Roy
- Musicians in Exile by Jacques Holender
- No Apologies by Ken Pittman
- Paper Wedding by Michel Brault
- The Party by Pierre Falardeau
- Perfectly Normal by Yves Simoneau
- Princes in Exile by Giles Walker
- White Room by Patricia Rozema

=== Midnight Madness ===
- Two Evil Eyes by George A. Romero and Dario Argento
- Bride of Re-Animator by Brian Yuzna
- Hardware by Richard Stanley
- My Degeneration by Jon Moritsugu
- The Church by Michele Soavi
- Frankenhooker by Frank Henenlotter
- Def by Temptation by James Bond III
- Meet The Feebles by Peter Jackson
- Tetsuo: The Iron Man by Shinya Tsukamoto

=== Documentaries ===
- Resident Alien by Jonathan Nossiter
- Step Across the Border by Nicolas Humbert and Werner Penzel
