= Kathleen Shannon =

Canadian filmmaker (1935–1998)

Kathleen Shannon CM
- Born: November 11, 1935; Vancouver, British Columbia
- Died: January 9, 1998 (aged 62); Kelowna, British Columbia
- Occupation(s): Film director Film producer

Kathleen Shannon CM (11 November 1935 – 9 January 1998) was a Canadian film director and producer. She is best known as the founder and first executive producer of Studio D of the National Film Board of Canada, the first government-funded film studio in the world dedicated to women filmmakers.

== Career ==
=== Early career ===
Shannon began her career in the Canadian film industry cataloging music for Crawley Films in Ottawa after dropping out of high school at the age of 16. She later joined the National Film Board (NFB) as an editor in 1956 when she was 21. In her early years at the NFB Shannon worked as a sound, music, and picture editor. After Shannon had some 200 films to her credit as an editor she directed her first film, Goldwood in 1970. Goldwood was based on her childhood memories of one of the mining towns in Northern British Columbia where her father, a mining engineer, had worked.

From 1974 to 1975, Shannon produced and directed eleven short films that made up the Working Mothers film series. The films delve into the experiences of working mother's throughout Canada, with some of the films focused on an individual women, including Our Dear Sisters, whose subject was Indigenous filmmaker Alanis Obomsawin. The series was created as part of the NFB's Challenge for Change Program (1967–1980), which was a government funded initiative to bring the art and practice of film making to communities across Canada in an effort to incite social change. Initially meant to be one film, Shannon and distributive consultant Doris Mae Oulton proposed a format change of several short films and held small test screenings across different communities to try convince the NFB and the projects federal government sponsor of the new format's potential for success. With the new format approved, the Working Mother's series became arguably one of the most important achievements of Challenge for Change, and its success paved the way for Shannon's proposal for a women's studio within the NFB.

=== Studio D ===
Shannon was the driving force behind the creation of Studio D. She lobbied the unenthusiastic NFB to create a women's film production unit that would produce feminist documentaries created by and for women. When the studio was launched in 1974, it was housed in the basement of the NFB headquarters in Montreal with a budget of $100,000 and three women on staff; Shannon, Margaret Pettigrew, and Yuki Yoshida. Shannon became the first executive producer and remained in the role for 12 years before stepping down in June 1986.

In an interview with The Christian Science Monitor, Shannon outlined in what her opinion was the five objectives of Studio D: "providing employment opportunities for women, providing training opportunities for women, meeting the information needs of women, creating an environment that would facilitate 'exploring our creativity in our own way', [and] bringing the perspective of women to bear 'on all social issues.'"

While executive producer, Shannon oversaw the creation and production of over 80 films, including Not a Love Story: A Film About Pornography (1981), and the Academy Award-winning documentaries I'll Find a Way (1977) and If You Love This Planet (1982).

=== Legacy ===
In 1996, Studio D was closed due to decreased government funding and NFB layoffs. One of the last films produced by Studio D before it was shut down was a biographical documentary about Shannon entitled Kathleen Shannon: On Film, Feminism, and Other Dreams, directed by Gerry Rogers. The film includes personal interviews with Shannon as well as archival footage and photography. In the film Shannon reflects on various topics: from childhood, aging, and alcoholism, to the work-life balance, and her experiences during her time at the NFB and Studio D.

The NFB also established a documentary prize in Shannon's name, the "Kathleen Shannon Award" which is awarded annually at the Yorkton Short Film and Video Festival.

== Filmography ==
| Year | Film | Role |
|---|---|---|
| 1969 | You Are on Indian Land | Editor |
| 1971 | I Don't Think It's Meant for Us Challenge for Change series | Director; editor |
| 1974 | Goldwood | Director; writer; editor; music |
| 1974 | It's Not Enough, Challenge for Change series | Director; editor; producer |
| 1974 | Like the Trees, Challenge for Change series | Director; editor; producer |
| 1974 | Luckily I Need Little Sleep, Challenge for Change series | Director; editor; producer |
| 1974 | Mothers Are People, Challenge for Change series | Director; editor; producer |
| 1974 | Our Dear Sisters, Challenge for Change series | Director; producer |
| 1974 | The Spring and Fall of Nina Polanski | Producer; music |
| 1974 | They Appreciate You More, Challenge for Change series | Director; editor; producer |
| 1974 | Tiger on a Tight Leash, Challenge for Change series | Director; editor; producer |
| 1974 | Would I Ever Like to Work, Challenge for Change series | Director; editor; producer |
| 1975 | ...And They Lived Happily Ever After | Co-director with Irene Angelico, Anne Henderson; co-editor with Irene Angelico, Anne Henderson; producer |
| 1975 | Co-op Housing: The Best Move We Ever Made | Executive producer |
| 1975 | Co-op Housing: Getting It Together | Executive producer |
| 1975 | Great Grand Mother | Executive producer |
| 1975 | My Friends Call Me Tony | Executive producer |
| 1975 | My Name Is Susan Lee | Executive producer |
| 1976 | Just-A-Minute | Executive producer |
| 1976 | Maud Lewis: A World Without Shadows | Executive producer |
| 1976 | A Working Chance | Executive producer |
| 1977 | Beautiful Lennard Island | Executive producer |
| 1977 | Gurdeep Singh Bains | Executive producer |
| 1977 | How They Saw Us: Needles and Pins | Executive producer |
| 1977 | How They Saw Us: Women at War | Executive producer |
| 1977 | How They Saw Us: Women at Work | Executive producer |
| 1977 | Kevin Alex | Executive producer |
| 1977 | The Lady from Grey County | Executive producer |
| 1977 | Some American Feminists | Executive producer |
| 1977 | Veronica | Executive producer |
| 1978 | Benoît | Executive producer |
| 1978 | Canada Vignettes: Flin Flon | Executive producer |
| 1978 | Canada Vignettes: Holidays | Executive producer |
| 1978 | Canada Vignettes: Stunt Family | Executive producer |
| 1978 | Canada Vignettes: The Thirties | Executive producer |
| 1978 | Eve Lambart | Executive producer |
| 1978 | Patricia's Moving Picture | Executive producer |
| 1978 | Rencontre | Executive producer |
| 1978 | Sun, Wind and Wood | Executive producer |
| 1978 | An Unremarkable Birth | Executive producer |
| 1979 | Canada Vignettes: McIntosh | Executive producer |
| 1979 | Prairie Album | Executive producer |
| 1979 | The Right Candidate for Rosedale | Executive producer |
| 1979 | Sea Dream | Executive producer |
| 1980 | Boys Will Be Men | Executive producer |
| 1980 | Canada Vignettes: Agnes Campbell MacPhail | Executive producer |
| 1980 | Canada Vignettes: Birth | Executive producer |
| 1980 | Canada Vignettes: Homestead | Executive producer |
| 1980 | Canada Vignettes: The Vote | Executive producer |
| 1980 | Just A Lady | Executive producer |
| 1980 | Laila | Executive producer |
| 1980 | Rusting World | Executive producer |
| 1980 | The Town Mouse and the Country Mouse | Executive producer |
| 1981 | Julie O'Brien | Executive producer |
| 1981 | Louise Drouin: Veterinarian | Executive producer |
| 1982 | Four Centuries: The Firearm in Canada | Executive producer |
| 1982 | If You Love This Planet | Executive producer |
| 1982 | It's Just Better | Executive producer |
| 1982 | Portrait of the Artist... as an Old Lady | Executive producer |
| 1982 | The Way It Is | Executive producer |
| 1983 | Attention: Women at Work | Executive producer |
| 1983 | Dream of a Free Country: A Message from Nicaraguan Women | Director, producer |
| 1983 | I Want to Be an Engineer | Executive producer |
| 1983 | Pukaskwa National Park | Executive producer |
| 1984 | Pukaskwa National Park | Executive producer |
| 1984 | Adèle and the Ponies of Ardmore | Executive producer |
| 1984 | Abortion: Stories From North and South | Executive producer |
| 1984 | Behind the Veil: Nuns | Executive producer |
| 1984 | Head Start: Meeting the Computer Challenge | Executive producer |
| 1984 | On Our Own | Executive producer |
| 1984 | This Borrowed Land | Executive producer |
| 1984 | Too Dirty for a Woman | Executive producer |
| 1984 | The Treadmill | Executive producer |
| 1984 | Turnaround: A Story of Recovery | Writer; co-editor with Shelly Hamer; producer |
| 1984 | Waterwalker | Executive producer |
| 1984 | The Best Time of My Life: Portraits of Women in Mid-Life | Executive producer |
| 1984 | Dark Lullabies | Executive producer |
| 1984 | DES: An Uncertain Legacy | Executive producer |
| 1985 | Speaking Our Peace | Executive producer |
| 1985 | Spirit of the Kata | Executive producer |
| 1985 | A Writer in the Nuclear Age: A Conversation with Margaret Laurence | Executive producer |
| 1986 | Beyond Memory | Executive producer |
| 1986 | Children of War | Executive producer |
| 1986 | Doctor, Lawyer, Indian Chief | Executive producer |
| 1986 | Firewords: Louky Bersianik, Jovette Marchessault, Nicole Brossard | Executive producer |
| 1986 | First Take Double Take | Executive producer |
| 1986 | The Impossible Takes a Little Longer | Executive producer |
| 1986 | Moving On | Executive producer |
| 1986 | No Longer Silent | Executive producer |
| 1986 | Nuclear Addiction: Dr. Rosalie Bertell on the Cost of Deterrence | Executive producer |
| 1986 | A Safe Distance | Executive producer |
| 1986 | Speaking of Nairobi | Executive producer |
| 1986 | Sylvie's Story | Executive producer |
| 1986 | Thin Dreams | Executive producer |
| 1987 | The Legacy of Mary McEwen | Executive producer |
| 1987 | A Love Affair with Politics: A Portrait of Marion Dewar | Executive producer |
| 1987 | The Man Who Stole Dreams | Executive producer |
| 1987 | To a Safer Place | Executive producer |
| 1987 | Worth Every Minute | Executive producer |
| 1989 | 15th Anniversary | Narrator |
| 1989 | Adam's World | Executive producer |
| 1989 | Goddess Remembered | Executive producer |
| 1989 | Illuminated Lives: A Brief History of Women's Work in the Middle Ages | Executive producer |
| 1989 | Russian Diary | Executive producer |
| 1990 | The Burning Times | Executive producer |
| 1990 | Gathering Together, Faithful Women series | Director; co-editor with Gerry Rogers |
| 1990 | Harmony and Balance, Faithful Women series | Director; co-editor with Gerry Rogers |
| 1990 | I'll Never Forget You, Faithful Women series | Director; co-editor with Gerry Rogers |
| 1990 | Priorities and Perspectives, Faithful Women series | Director; co-editor with Gerry Rogers |
| 1990 | Texts and Contexts, Faithful Women series | Director; co-editor with Gerry Rogers |
| 1990 | Through Ignorance or Design, Faithful Women series | Director; co-editor with Gerry Rogers |
| 1990 | Working towards Peace, Faithful Women series | Director; editor |
| 1993 | Full Circle | Executive producer |
| 1997 | Kathleen Shannon: On Film, Feminism & Other Dreams | Featured; co-composer with Larry Crosley |

== Personal life ==
Shannon was married twice and had one son. After Shannon retired, she moved to the Kootenays where she opened a guest house for women and worked as a therapist.

In 1986, Shannon was awarded the Order of Canada because, "Under her leadership, the National Film Board's Studio D – which she founded in 1974 – succeeded in producing award-winning socially and culturally committed films which have made Canada and the studio internationally known for the excellence and relevance of its work." Shannon was also bestowed three honorary degrees: a Doctor of Laws from Queen's University in 1984, a Doctor of Letters from York University in 1996, and a Doctor of Humane Letters from Mount Saint Vincent University in 1997.

Shannon died on January 9, 1998, at the age of 62. She had been diagnosed with lung cancer two weeks prior, and died during surgery to remove a tumor in Kelowna, British Columbia.
