= Chestnut Street, Kent =

Coordinates: 51.342°N 0.686°E

Chestnut Street
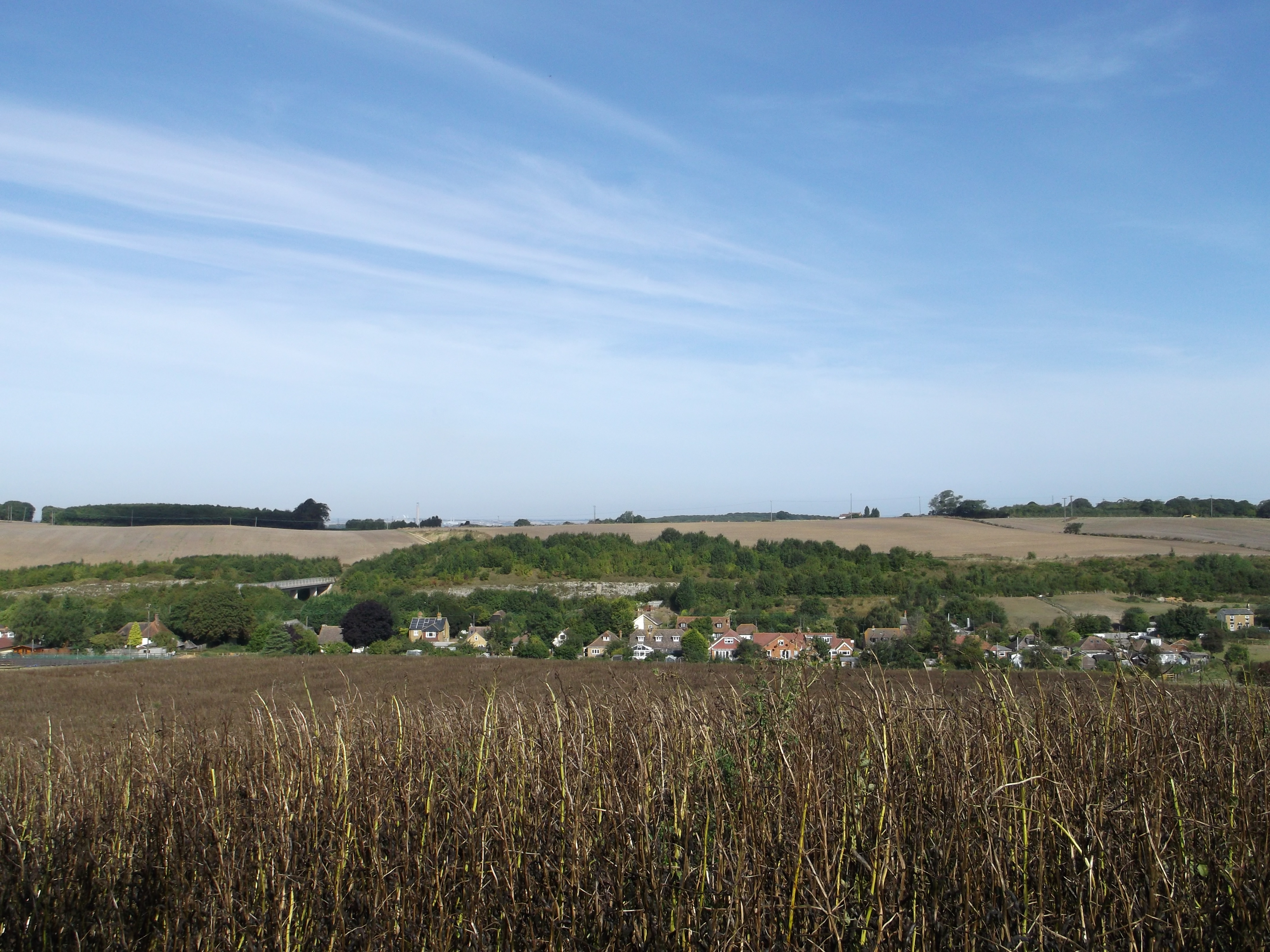
- View of Chestnut Street

- Location within Kent
- District: Swale
- Shire county: Kent
- Region: South East
- Country: England
- Sovereign state: United Kingdom
- Post town: Sittingbourne
- Postcode district: ME9
- Police: Kent
- Fire: Kent
- Ambulance: South East Coast

Chestnut Street is a settlement to the west of Sittingbourne in the Borough of Swale, Kent, England.

It is located on the former A249 road alignment, between the junction with the A2 road near Key Street and Danaway. The A249, a dual carriageway since the 1990s, avoids Chestnut Street. Its postal address is Chestnut Street, Borden, Kent; that village is a mile (1.6 km) to the east.

There are a number of Grade II listed buildings in the hamlet, including Hooks Hole, Old Houses, Dumbles, Tudor Rose Cottage, Oldstede, and Chestnut Street Farmhouse.
