= Heart's Delight =

Heart's Delight may refer to:

- Heart's Delight, Swale, a settlement in Kent, England
- Heart's Delight, City of Canterbury, a settlement in Kent, England
- Heart's Delight-Islington, a town in Newfoundland and Labrador, Canada
