= Oad Street =

Hamlet in Kent, England

Coordinates: 51°19′39″N 0°40′56″E

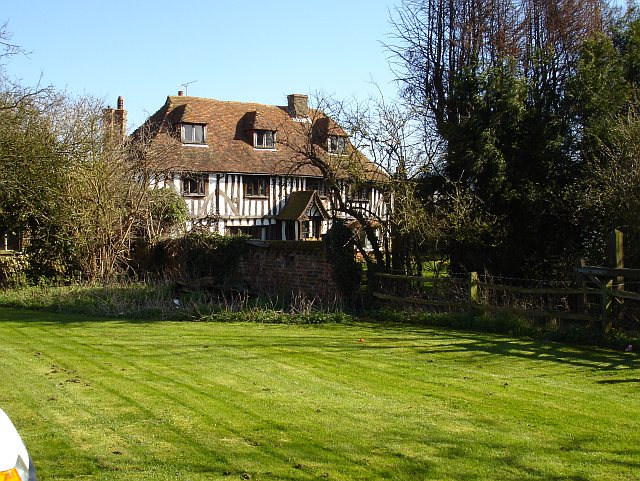
- The Olde House, Oad Street

- Location within Kent
- OS grid reference: TQ869621
- Civil parish: Borden
- District: Swale
- Shire county: Kent
- Region: South East
- Country: England
- Sovereign state: United Kingdom
- Post town: Sittingbourne
- Postcode district: ME9
- Police: Kent
- Fire: Kent
- Ambulance: South East Coast

Oad Street is a small hamlet in the English county of Kent. It forms part of the civil parish of Borden which, in turn, is part of Swale district. Oad Street is located close to Junction 5 of the M2 motorway where it crosses the A249 road.

== History ==
In 1798, Edward Hasted records that this hamlet was once called Hoade Street and Woodstreet, before becoming Oade Street. Named after a nearby Chestnut Wood (which covered the hillside down towards Danaway). In 1653, most of the parish was controlled by William Genery (from Throwley).

== Architecture ==
In the hamlet are 3 listed buildings, Grade II* listed 'Yew Tree Cottage',Grade II listed 'The Olde House', and Grade II listed 'Hoad House'. Also a local public house, the 'Plough & Harrow' public house. It also had a former Wesleyan Chapel (Oad Street Methodist Church), now converted into a private residence. Oad Street food and craft, a restaurant and art gallery.
