= Tops & Bottoms: Sex, Power and Sadomasochism =

1999 Canadian documentary film

- Directed by: Cristine Richey
- Written by: Cristine Richey; John Kramer
- Produced by: Cristine Richey
- Starring: Robert Dante; Mary Dante
- Cinematography: Micha Dahan; Joan Hutton; Richard Stringer; John Walker; Peter Walker
- Edited by: Jack Morbin
- Music by: Nicholas Stirling
- Production company: Barking at Moon Productions
- Release date: September 17, 1999 (TIFF)
- Running time: 80 minutes
- Country: Canada
- Language: English

Tops & Bottoms: Sex, Power and Sadomasochism is a Canadian documentary film, directed by Cristine Richey and released in 1999. The film depicts the BDSM subculture, most notably through the relationship of BDSM enthusiast couple Robert and Mary Dante.

The film premiered in the Perspectives Canada at the 1999 Toronto International Film Festival, and was subsequently screened in the Midnight Madness lineup at the 1999 Cinefest Sudbury International Film Festival. It was broadcast by TVOntario as an episode of The View from Here in February 2000.

The film received a Genie Award nomination for Best Feature Length Documentary at the 20th Genie Awards in 2000.
