= Borden, Kent =

Village in Kent, England

Coordinates: 51.334°N 0.703°E

Borden
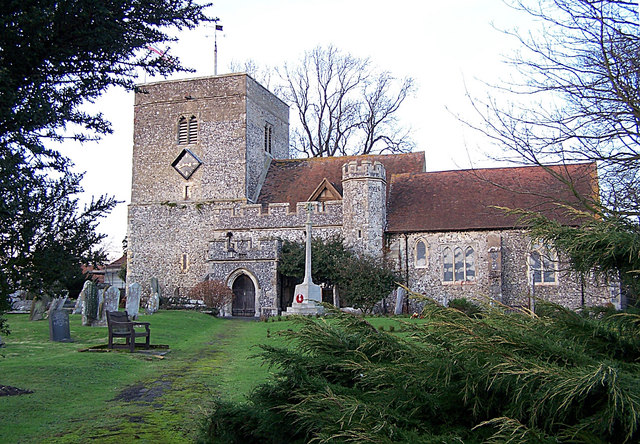
- Borden's grade I listed church

- Location within Kent
- Population: 2,432 (2011)
- District: Swale
- Shire county: Kent
- Region: South East
- Country: England
- Sovereign state: United Kingdom
- Post town: Sittingbourne
- Postcode district: ME9
- Dialling code: 01795
- Police: Kent
- Fire: Kent
- Ambulance: South East Coast
- UK Parliament: Sittingbourne and Sheppey

Borden is a village and electoral ward situated immediately south west of Sittingbourne, Kent, from which it is separated by a small area of rural land.

The history of the name could be questioned. It may be derived from bor (hill) and then either from denu (valley) or denn (woodland pasture). It may also derive from "boar" "den", as it was known that the wild animals were found in the surrounding areas. Borden was first recorded in the twelfth century as Bordena. However it is more likely to stem from Sir Francis de Bourdon (variations today also include Borden/Burden/Bourdon), who descended from the de Bourdons of Bayeux, in Normandy, France. Francis de Bourdon became Lord of the existing castle and surrounding lands, granted to him by William the Conqueror, as a gift to his vassal after the great Norman victory in 1066, and at which time became known as Bourdon. The lands were previously lorded over by the Saxon Ethelwolf of Kent, who perished at the Battle of Hastings (1066), Over the next few generations the name had become more English to reflect the Saxon population and became known as Borden.

The church and churchyard, which still stands today, were commissioned around the year 1210 by the Lady Robergia de Bourdon, (the daughter of Elfrida of Kent who was granddaughter of the defeated Saxon Ethelwolf and of Sir Simon de Bourdon of Bourdon and grandson of the conquering Sir Francis de Bourdon, and the wife of Sir Francis de Bourdon), and contain the remains of the family's earliest-known members.

The playstool is a name given to the village recreation ground and is the home ground of Borden Village FC. The club play in the Kent County Football League and are known as 'The Villagers'.

The village centre is clustered around the Grade I listed church, which is dedicated to Saints Peter and Paul and is at least eight hundred years old. The Church of England primary school and the local inn (The Maypole) are also in the centre. The Church of England primary school received an Ofsted overall effectiveness report of outstanding, after improving its reputation and teaching standards substantially over the last ten years.

Within the parish are several hamlets, including Heart's Delight, Chestnut Street and Oad Street. Farming in the area is the main industry, although this has been in decline for many years due to the "scrubbing" of most of the cherry and other fruit orchards. Borden also had a bell foundry and small ironmongers.

Today Borden is growing with new houses and has greater ties with Sittingbourne. Many residents now commute to major towns or London to work.

== Demography ==
Borden compared
2001 UK Census	Borden ward	Swale borough	England
Population	2,154	122,801	49,138,831
Foreign born	3.1%	3.7%	9.2%
White	99.1%	98.1%	90.9%
Asian	0.5%	0.8%	4.6%
Black	0%	0.3%	2.3%
Christian	79.9%	75.9%	71.7%
Muslim	0.4%	0.4%	3.1%
Hindu	0.3%	0.2%	1.1%
No religion	13.4%	15.4%	14.6%
Unemployed	2.5%	3.5%	3.3%
Retired	13.4%	13.6%	13.5%

At the 2001 UK census, the Borden electoral ward had a population of 2,154. The ethnicity was 99.1% white, 0.3% mixed race, 0.5% Asian, 0% black and 0.1% other. The place of birth of residents was 96.9% United Kingdom, 0.4% Republic of Ireland, 0.7% other Western European countries, and 2% elsewhere. Religion was recorded as 79.9% Christian, 0.1% Buddhist, 0.3% Hindu, 0% Sikh, 0% Jewish, and 0.4% Muslim. 13.4% were recorded as having no religion, 0.3% had an alternative religion and 5.5% did not state their religion.

The economic activity of residents aged 16–74 was 43.7% in full-time employment, 11.5% in part-time employment, 12.2% self-employed, 2.5% unemployed, 2.3% students with jobs, 2.6% students without jobs, 13.4% retired, 7% looking after home or family, 2.7% permanently sick or disabled and 2.1% economically inactive for other reasons. The industry of employment of residents was 17.1% retail, 16.3% manufacturing, 10.1% construction, 13.3% real estate, 7.7% health and social work, 6.8% education, 6.3% transport and communications, 5.1% public administration, 3.6% hotels and restaurants, 5.2% finance, 2.9% agriculture and 5.6% other. Compared with national figures, the ward had a relatively high proportion of workers in agriculture and construction. There were a relatively low proportion in health and social work, hotels and restaurants. Of the ward's residents aged 16–74, 16.7% had a higher education qualification or the equivalent, compared with 19.9% nationwide.

== People ==
- Robert Plot
- Violet McNaughton (née Jackson; 1879 – 1968), journalist and women's rights activist

== See also ==
- Borden Grammar School
- Listed buildings in Borden, Kent
