= Joan Hutton =

Canadian cinematographer

- Born: Ontario, Canada
- Education: Ryerson Polytechnical Institute
- Occupation: Cinematographer

Joan Hutton is a Canadian cinematographer, with work featured in over 36 films. She is best known for her work in Hitman Hart: Wrestling with Shadows (1998), The Famine Within (1990), The Spring and Fall of Nina Polanski (1974) and the TV series The Newsroom. Hutton was the first female president of the Canadian Society of Cinematographers, and the first woman to be given the ability to place 'csc' after her name, which represents being a full member.

== Early life and education ==
Joan Hutton was born and raised in southern Ontario's Toronto area. She attended W. Tresper Clarke High School in Orono, ON, graduating in 1965 and then went on to begin her secondary education with studying commercial photography. Later Hutton enrolled in film studies at Toronto's Ryerson Polytechnical Institute, graduating in 1974. After studying at Ryerson, Hutton began working as a camera assistant where she discovered her interest in cinematography.

== Career ==
In 1974, Joan Hutton joined the Canadian Society of Cinematographers as an affiliate member. In 1980, Hutton founded a production company called High Road Productions with Paul Jay. During Hutton's time here, she did work for CBC, TVOntario, CTV and the Discovery Channel. High Road Productions was a milestone in Hutton's career because it allowed her to gain experience in the field of cinematography shortly after school. After years as Vice-President of the firm Hutton stepped away to pursue other opportunities. In the years to follow Hutton worked on many different projects in the industry, she shot films, documentaries and TV. Hutton started in the film industry as a camera assistant, then became a camera operator, and then later a director of photography (also known as a cinematographer). In 1991, Hutton became president of the Canadian Society of Cinematographers, where she eventually was awarded CSC in 1994. She remained president of CSC until 2014, she remains Editor in Chief of the CSC magazine Canadian Cinematographer.

=== The Newsroom ===
The Newsroom is a TV comedy-drama that aired for 3 seasons on CBC in 1996–97, 2003–04 and 2004–05, and was followed by a two-hour TV movie called Escape From The Newsroom in 2002. Hutton's work in this show depicts a "naturalist" style, where she uses long takes and a handheld camera to avoid appearing like a typical TV drama, where everything is evidently staged. Throughout the filming of the series, Hutton often had to figure out her framing as she filmed, but she made sure that her lighting was on point by ensuring lighting mechanisms were hidden, yet the light was visible for shots and characters. She also used a handheld 12V Kino Flo fixture behind the camera, it was used to provide light no matter where the action took her and the camera. Hutton used a digital betacam to film the show and although she made sure there was always proper lighting, she didn't want there to be too much light, which would make the show appear unnatural.

== Filmography ==
Hutton holds over 36 credits in various films.

=== Cinematography ===
- The Spring and Fall of Nina Polanski (1974)
- The Best Time of My Life: Portraits of Women in Mid-life (1985)
- Imperfect Union: Canadian Labour and the Left, Part 1: International Background - Canadian Roots (1989)
- Imperfect Union: Canadian Labour and the Left, Part 4: New Party, Old Problems (1989)
- The Famine Within (1990)
- Sandra's Garden (1990)
- Sisters in the Struggle (1991)
- Sedna: The Making of a Myth (1992)
- Them That's Not (1993)
- Out: Stories of Lesbian and Gay Youth in Canada (1994)
- Motherland: Tales of Wonder (1994)
- The Champagne Safari (1995)
- Ms. Conceptions (1995)
- Married Life (1995)
- If Only I Were an Indian... (1996)
- The Powder Room (1997)
- The Newsroom (1996–2005)
- Hitman Hart: Wrestling with Shadows (1998)
- Tops & Bottoms: Sex, Power and Sadomasochism (1999)
- Letters to a Street Child (1999)
- Redskins, Tricksters and Puppy Stew (2000)
- The Devil You Know: Inside the Mind of Todd McFarlan (2001)
- It's a Girl's World (2004)
- Life Inside Out (2006)

=== Camera Department ===
- I'll Find a Way (1977)
- Being Different (1981)
- Class of 1984 (1982)
- Hedwig and the Angry Inch (2001)

=== Director ===
- The Spring and Fall of Nina Polanski (1974)
- Just-a-Minute (1976)

=== Producer ===
- The Spring and Fall of Nina Polanski (1974)

== Awards and nominations ==
Awards Won:

- Fuji Award
- Blizzard Award
- Crystal Award
- Gemini: Best Photography in a Comedy, Variety or Performing Arts Program or Series
- Toronto Women in Film: Outstanding Achievement Award
- 3 CSC Awards for Best Documentary Cinematography

Nominations

- CSC: Best Cinematography in Dramatic Short
- Gemini: Best Photography in a Comedy, Variety or Performing Arts Program or Series
