= Ginny Stikeman =

Canadian film editor and producer

Virginia "Ginny" Stikeman is a Canadian filmmaker, director, producer and editor known for her documentary work. Stikeman had a 30-year career at the National Film Board of Canada, and led its women's unit, Studio D, from 1990 until its closure in 1996.

== Biography ==
Ginny Stikeman was born in Ottawa, Ontario, and grew up in Montreal, Quebec. She graduated from McGill University with a BA in English and French. After a time working in Paris and then in Montreal for Time magazine, she joined the National Film Board of Canada in 1968 as a researcher for Challenge for Change. She later trained as an editor and moved to Studio D, the women's unit, in 1975 as an editor and producer.

== Career ==
Among her more noteworthy achievements at Studio D, Stikeman was the co-producer on the award-winning documentary Forbidden Love: The Unashamed Stories of Lesbian Lives. She co-directed Sisters in the Struggle with Dionne Brand. She was also the producer and editor of Older, Stronger, and Wiser.

Stikeman was announced as acting executive producer for Studio D in 1986 and was officially appointed the position of executive producer in 1990. Stikeman worked as executive producer until Studio D's closure in 1996, officially retiring in 1998.

After retirement, Stikeman has worked with the Blue Metropolis literary festival as part of the Premio Azul Programming Committee in Montreal, Quebec, a non-profit organization that promotes and encourages reading, writing and creativity for people of all cultures. The organization was founded in 1997 by Linda Leith. The Blue Metropolis Festival produces the annual International Literary Festival with a variety of awards and prizes. Stikeman started sponsoring the Metropolis Azul Prize in 2013, which is awarded each year to an author from any country who creates a work of fiction that treats aspects of Hispanic culture and is published in Spanish, English or French.

== Awards and nominations ==
Stikeman was the editor on I'll Find a Way, which won the Academy Award for best live action short film, and Cree Hunters of Mistassini, which won the BAFTA for best documentary.

== Legacy ==
Stikeman is credited with bringing a deep commitment to film activism and "getting more women of different ethnic backgrounds into filmmaking".

== Filmography ==
1973	The Sloane Affair	Editor
1973	Where Do We Go from Here	Editor
1974	Cree Hunters of Mistassini	Editor
1974	Our Land Is Our Life	Editor
1975	My Friends Call Me Tony	Editor
1976	Temiscaming Quebec	Editor
1976	Listen Listen Listen	Editor
1977	Harmonie	Editor
1977	I'll Find a Way	Editor
1978	'round and 'round	Editor
1980	North China Factory	Editor
1980	Wuxing People's Commune	Editor
1980	North China Commune	Editor
1983	Dream of a Free Country: A Message from Nicaraguan Women	Director
1983	I Want to Be an Engineer	Editor
1984	On Our Own	Editor
1985	Discussions in Bioethics: A Chronic Problem	Editor
1985	Discussions in Bioethics: Who Should Decide?	Editor
1985	The World Turned Upside Down	Editor
1985	The Cap	Editor
1986	Doctor, Lawyer, Indian Chief	Editor
1987	The Legacy of Mary McEwan	Editor
1989	Older, Stronger, Wiser	Editor
1991	Sisters in the Struggle	Co-Director, Producer
1992	Forbidden Love: The Unashamed Stories of Lesbian Lives	Co-Producer
1992	Wisecracks	Producer
1992	A Balancing Act	Producer
1992	Le plafond de verre	Producer
1992	Making Perfect Babies	Producer
1992	Women in the Shadows	Producer
1992	Return Home	Producer
1993	Long Time Comin'	Producer
1994	Twenty Years of Feminist Filmmaking	Producer
1994	Motherland: Tales of Wonder	Producer
1996	Asking Different Questions: Women and Science	Producer
1996	Listening for Something ... Adrienne Rich and Dionne Brand in Conversation	Producer
1996	Taking Charge	Producer
1997	An Untidy Package	Producer
1997	Jeunes, beaux et entreprenants	Producer

Filmography from IMDb
