= Yuki Yoshida =

Yuki Yoshida (born c.1914) was a Japanese-Canadian film editor and film producer. In 1978, Yoshida received an academy award for I'll Find a Way in the Best Short Film category with Beverly Shaffer.

== Life ==
After her mother's death in 1925, Yoshida did not return to school. Even when the war was over, there was little reason to make up her education. Back then, the chances of getting a job were too uncertain. Moreover, the idea of having a career was unfamiliar to most of the women in Yoshida's generation, especially those who, like Yoshida, grew up in rural Japanese communities. In the summer of 1944, towards the end of the Second World War, Yoshida and her sister left the incarceration camp in Tashme, British Columbia.

== Career in Film ==
In the late 1940s, Yoshida got a job at the National Film Board of Canada in Ottawa, where she worked until the mid-1960s as editor of, among others, the films Ducks, of Course (1966) and Tuktu and the Snow Palace (1967). In 1975, she became a technical producer in Studio D, a women's production unit that emerged in response to a directive from the Canadian government for more women in technical professions. Shortly before retiring in 1978, she was a member of the team that received an Academy Award for the film I'll Find a Way. In the film, she processes, among other things, her own childhood memories.

== Filmography ==
- Ducks, of Course (1966)
- Tuktu and the Snow Palace (1967)
- The North Has Changed (1967)
- The Accessible Arctic (1967)
- Tuktu and the Clever Hands (1968)
- Veronica (1977)
- I'll Find a Way (1977)
- How They Saw Us: Needles and Pins (1977)
- Beautiful Lennard Island (1977)
