= Challenge for Change =

Canadian participatory film and video project

Challenge for Change (French: Societé Nouvelle) was a participatory film and video project created by the National Film Board of Canada in 1967, the Canadian Centennial. Active until 1980, Challenge for Change used film and video production to illuminate the social concerns of various communities within Canada, with funding from eight different departments of the Canadian government. The impetus for the program was the belief that film and video were useful tools for initiating social change and eliminating poverty. As Druik says, "The new program, which was developed in tandem with the new social policies, was based on the argument that participation in media projects could empower disenfranchised groups and that media representation might effectively bring about improved political representation." Stewart, quoting Jones (1981) states "the Challenge for Change films would convey messages from 'the people' (particularly disadvantaged groups) to the government, directly or through the Canadian public."

In total, the program would lead to the creation of over 200 films and videos: approximately 145 works in English and more than 60 in French.

The collection, which was preceded by Tanya Ballantyne's 1967 film The Things I Cannot Change, notably included 27 films by Colin Low about life on Fogo Island, Newfoundland, produced in 1967. Known collectively as The Fogo Process, these Fogo Island films had an enormous impact on the future direction of the program, and were created thanks to the vision of Newfoundland academic Donald Snowden, who saw a need for a community media project as early as 1965.

Started by John Kemeny, Colin Low, Fernand Dansereau and Robert Forget, and later run by George C. Stoney, the Challenge for Change program was designed to give voice to the "voiceless." A key aspect of Challenge for Change was the transfer of control over the filmmaking process from professional filmmakers to community members, so that ordinary Canadians in underrepresented communities could tell their own stories on screen. Community dialogue and government responses to the issues were crucial to the program and took precedence over the "quality" of the films produced. The French-language Societé Nouvelle program was established under the direction of executive producer Léonard Forest.

As the program developed, responsibility for the film production was put increasingly into the hands of community members, who both filmed events and had a say in the editing of the films, through advance screenings open only to those who were the subjects of the films.

The program was the subject of a 1968 NFB documentary. It was also explored in an episode of the NFB Pioneers series on the Documentary Channel. It is the focus of a collection of essays and archival documents edited by Thomas Waugh, Michael Brendan Baker, and Ezra Winton, Challenge for Change: Activist Documentary at the National Film Board of Canada (McGill-Queen's University Press, 2010).

== The Fogo Process ==
Fogo Island was a watershed moment for Challenge for Change with the "Fogo Process," as it came to be known, becoming a model for using media as a tool for participatory community development.

The idea for the Fogo Process originated in 1965, prior to the start of Challenge for Change, when Donald Snowden, then Director of the Extension Department at Memorial University of Newfoundland was dismayed by the urban focus of the Economic Council of Canada's "Report on Poverty in Canada." Snowden wanted to produce a series of films to present how the people of Newfoundland felt about poverty and other issues. In 1967, with Challenge for Change already underway, Snowden discussed his ideas with Low and introduced him to the university's Fogo Island field officer Fred Earle.

Low credited Earle with sparking his interest in the project: "I went to Fogo Island mainly because I was impressed by Fred Earle. I had an idea if nothing more happened I could make a film about a fine community development worker who would help justify our involvement." The opening voiceover narration to Introduction to Fogo Island also testifies to his key role, stating that Earle "was born and raised in Fogo Island. He knows, and is known, by all its people.... we, as outsiders, felt that we could never go into such a community without the help of such a person."

In the films, Fogo Islanders identified a number of key issues: the inability to organize, the need for communication, the resentment felt towards resettlement and the anger that the government seemed to be making decisions about their future with no consultation. Low decided to show the films to the people of Fogo and thirty-five separate screenings were held with the total number of viewers reaching 3,000. It became clear that while people were not always comfortable discussing issues with each other face-to-face, they were comfortable explaining their views on film. By watching themselves and their neighbours on screen, islanders began to realize that they were all experiencing the same problems.

There were concerns at Memorial University over the political consequences of criticisms of the government expressed in the films. It was decided that the Premier of Newfoundland and his cabinet should view the films. This had the effect of allowing fishermen to talk to their cabinet ministers. The Minister of Fisheries, Aidan Maloney, also asked to respond to criticisms on film. This facilitated a two-way communication between community members and decision makers. The films contributed to an island-wide sense of community and assisted people in looking for alternatives to resettlement.

== Projects ==
=== Indian Film Crew (IFC) aka The National Indian Training Program ===
The Indian Film Crew was a pioneering First Nations film program in Challenge for Change (CC or sometimes CFC), a joint undertaking of the National Film Board and the Company of Young Canadians, "until CYC funding dried up." These training programs ran 1968-70 and 1971-73 but ultimately CFC "failed to build sustaining structures for Aboriginal production at the Board or in communities."

George Stoney says the individuals were chosen from different "tribes" across Canada, according to requirements set by the Department of Indian Affairs, and some were traditional enemies, though the trainees themselves were interested in the idea of a national "Indian" approach: Tom O'Connor stated "We want to get the reserves to talk to each other for the first time, to get a sense of unity." "Their training [wa]s based on the belief that people should speak for themselves instead of being spoken for" and ran for only five months' covering various aspects of film making, plus trainees worked on community development projects and research for future films.

In the spring of 1968 the program began with seven Indigenous persons (or eight, leaving six after two left). Members are being credited in retrospect for some of the films they would make, with attributions continuing to be recorded retrospectively by the NFB on the NFB website. These trainees were:

- camerawork: Barbara Wilson (Haida) and Tom O’Connor (Manitoulin Island)
- sound and editing: Noel Starblanket (Cree from SK) and Roy Daniels (Ojibwa from Manitoba)
- direction and production: Willie Dunn (Micmac from Montréal) and Mike Mitchell (Mohawk from St. Regis)
- editing: Morris Isaac (Restigouche) was an initial member who left the program
- Ernie Benedict (Mohawk from St. Regis) may have been the 8th person or was someone already working for the NFB and is recorded as project director for Travelling College

Noel Starblanket, one of the original members wrote in a 1968 article that the first three films of the program [CC not IFC], while "closer to depicting a truer perspective of the “Indian problem”... [they] still lacked a real Indian point of view...[and that] the next logical step would be to involve Indians as filmmakers." Stewart notes the IFC style of working: "Direct cinema, to the new trainees, meant an opportunity to present an Indian viewpoint. It presented the chance to organize at the local level as well as between communities. Stylistically, too, the trainees used a direct cinema approach to document not just Indian views of their own histories, but culturally distinct ways of preserving and transmitting these histories."

The second set of trainees included:

- Albert Canadien (Slave Lake/Yellowknife, NWT)
- Bob Charlie (Athabaskan/Whitehorse, Yukon)
- Gilbert Herodier (Cree/Fort George, Québec)
- Glen Lazore (Mohawk/St. Regis, Ontario)
- Michael Mitchell (acting as a producer-consultant for the crew)
- Buckley Petawabano (Cree/Northern Québec)
- Alex Redcrow (Cree/Northern Alberta)

The unit's first release was The Ballad of Crowfoot (1968), described as "the first NFB film to present First Nations experience from an Indigenous point of view." A documentary was also made about the effort to increase aboriginal representation in film making. IFCs credits include Travelling College (1968), These Are My People (1969), You Are On Indian Land (1969), This Was the Time (1970), The Other Side of the Ledger: An Indian View of the Hudson's Bay Company (1972), Who Were The Ones (1972),

=== Working Mothers Series ===
A collection of eleven films from 1974-1975 produced and directed by NFB icon Kathleen Shannon. The films focus on ordinary women and capture the contradictions and frustrations of their daily lives. The series laid the foundation for the launch of the National Film Board's women's unit, known colloquially as Studio D. Shannon was the founder and first Executive Producer.

=== Montreal ===
VTR St-Jacques, directed by Bonnie Sherr Klein, chronicles the efforts of Dorothy Todd Hénaut as she trains community members in video production as they organize themselves to fight the city of Montreal for affordable and accessible medical care. VTR St-Jacques was the first Canadian community-made video and numerous showings across Canada and the U.S. inspired a wealth of similar projects.

=== Acadia ===
"At the National Film Board of Canada, Léonard Forest was more than simply a filmmaker. Directly involved in over 150 films during a thirty-year career, he was first a scriptwriter and translator and later became a script editor, director, and producer. He had been the director of the French Production Branch of the NFB since 1957 when, in 1970, he took charge of the restructuring of the NFB team, Groupe de recherches sociales (GRS), which, while joining the Challenge for Change (CFC) program in the institutional sense, acquired its own identity as Société nouvelle (SN), retaining its own ideology in its focus on social change and giving a voice to the underprivileged."

As a filmmaker for SN, Léonard Forest directed a landmark film in the history of Canadian documentary: “La Noce est pas finie”. The film deliberately blurs the lines between socially engaged cinema, documentary and fiction. Hence, it represents a new avenue for SN/CFC’s exploratory work, specifically an exploration of Moreno’s psychodrama initiating role-play to give a voice to the disenfranchised citizen. In doing so, it established an Acadian methodology that enabled citizens to develop a participatory democracy rooted in their own Acadian cultural codes. Despite his workload of administrative and executive responsibilities, he remained a filmmaker of vision and importance.

== Legacy ==
Donald Snowden went on to apply the Fogo process all over the world until his death in India in 1984.

In 2007, the NFB launched Filmmaker-in-Residence a cross-media project based on the Challenge for Change model, with frontline health care workers, in partnership with St. Michael's Hospital, Toronto. Challenge for Change was also cited as an inspiration for the NFB's 2011 web documentary, One Millionth Tower.

== See also ==
- À St-Henri le cinq septembre, a 1962 documentary whose averse public reaction was instrumental in the NFB's development of a participatory filmmaking approach

== Bibliography ==
- Challenge for Change: Activist Documentary at the National Film Board of Canada (2010). Thomas Waugh, Michael Brendan Baker, Ezra Winton (eds). Montreal-Kingston: McGill-Queens University Press.
- Clifton Moore, Rick (1987). Canada's Challenge for Change: Documentary Film and Video as an Exercise of Power through the Production of Cultural Reality. PhD Thesis, University of Oregon.
- Druick, Zoe (2007). Projecting Canada: Government Policy and Documentary Film at the National Film Board of Canada. McGill-Queen's University Press. pp. 126–132. ISBN 978-0-7735-3259-5.
- Jones, D.B. (1981)."Challenge for Change: The Artist Nearly abdicates," in Jones, D.B., Movies and Memoranda: An Interpretative History of the National Film Board of Canada. Ottawa: Canadian Film Institute, 157–175.
- Kurchak, Marie (1977). "What Challenge? What Change" in S. Feldman & J. Nelson (eds) Canadian Film Reader. Toronto: Peter Martin, 120–127.
- Low, Colin (1984). "Grierson and 'Challenge for Change,'" in The John Grierson Project, John Grierson and the NFB. Toronto: ECW Press, 111–119.
- Mackenzie, Scott (1996). "Societe Nouvelle: the Challenge for Change in the alternative public sphere" in Canadian Journal of Film Studies, 5:2, 67–83.
- Marchessault, Janine (1995). "Reflections on the dispossessed: video and the 'Challenge for Change' experiment", Screen 36:2, 131–146.
- Marchessault. Jan (1995). "Amateur Video and the Challenge for Change" in J. Marchessault ed. Mirror Machine: Video and Identity. Toronto: YYZ Books.
- Watson, Patrick (1977). "Challenge for Change" in S. Feldman & J. Nelson (eds) Canadian Film Reader. Toronto: Peter Martin, 112–119.
