= The Things I Cannot Change =

1967 Canadian film directed by Tanya Ballantyne

- Directed by: Tanya Ballantyne
- Produced by: John Kemeny
- Starring: Kenneth Bailey; Gertrude Bailey
- Cinematography: Paul Leach
- Edited by: William Brind
- Production company: National Film Board of Canada
- Distributed by: CBC Television
- Release date: May 3, 1967
- Running time: 58 minutes
- Country: Canada
- Language: English

The Things I Cannot Change is a Canadian documentary film, directed by Tanya Ballantyne and released in 1967. A precursor of the National Film Board of Canada's Challenge for Change program, the film profiles the issue of urban poverty through the story of Kenneth and Gertrude Bailey, parents of a large family coping with unstable employment in Montreal.

The film was broadcast by CBC Television on May 3, 1967 as an episode of the anthology series Festival.

Controversy arose when its cinéma vérité style struck some viewers as exploitative of the Baileys. Kenneth and Gertrude Bailey alleged that, after the film's broadcast by CBC Television, their own reputation in the community suffered so badly that they were forced to move out of their home.

A sequel, Courage to Change, was released in 1984.

== Awards ==
- Golden Gate International Film Festival, San Francisco: Award for Excellence in Network Presentation, 1967
- International Short Film Festival Oberhausen, Oberhausen, Germany: Diploma of Merit, 1968
- Montreal International Film Festival, Montreal: Special Mention, Medium-Length Films, 1967
- Conference on Children, Washington, DC: Certificate of Merit, 1970
- 21st British Academy Film Awards, London: Nominee: BAFTA Award for Best Documentary, 1968
