= If You Love This Planet =

- Directed by: Terre Nash
- Produced by: Edward Le Lorrain; Kathleen Shannon (exec.)
- Starring: Helen Caldicott
- Cinematography: André-Luc Dupont; Susan Trow; Don Virgo
- Edited by: Terre Nash; Jackie Newell (sound)
- Music by: Karl du Plessis
- Production company: Studio D
- Distributed by: National Film Board of Canada
- Release date: 1982
- Running time: 26 minutes
- Country: Canada
- Language: English
- Budget: $70,117

If You Love This Planet is a 1982 Canadian documentary short film directed by Terre Nash, produced by Studio D, the women's unit of the National Film Board of Canada.

== Plot ==
The film is a recording of a lecture given to SUNY Plattsburgh students by Australian physician and anti-nuclear activist Dr. Helen Caldicott about the dangers posed by nuclear weapons. While Caldicott speaks about the dangers of nuclear war and what it could mean in terms of casualties, Nash cuts from the speech to black-and-white images of the bombings of Hiroshima and Nagasaki.

== Production ==
Terre Nash was a student at McGill University when she heard a lecture by Helen Caldicott. Nash decided to create her first film based on the lecture.

The film was created by Studio D with a budget of $70,117 (equivalent to $209,712 in 2025). The NFB's Board of Governors stated that the film was the "hottest film since Not a Love Story". The Ministry of External Affairs opposed including Ronald Reagan in the film. Footage from Recognition of the Japanese Zero Fighter, a 1943 United States Department of War film, featuring Reagan was used in the film. The NFB opposed including the footage of Reagan, but allowed it to stay in the film after six months of debate.

== Release ==
The film was meant to be shown at the United Nations's Conference on Disarmament. It debuted in the United Kingdom when it was screened by the London Socialist Film Co-op.

The Canadian Broadcasting Corporation declined to broadcast the film, "because it takes a strong position on nuclear arms and does not give a balanced and objective view of the subject", and that they could not counter the film as it would be difficult to assemble a discussion panel including supporters of nuclear war. The film was later shown on the CBC newsmagazine The Journal.

== Reception ==
On 13 January 1983, the American distributors of If You Love This Planet, Acid Rain: Requiem or Recovery, and Acid from Heaven were ordered to register as foreign agents by the United States Department of Justice citing the Foreign Agents Registration Act. The films were also ordered to be labeled as political propaganda. Barry Keene, a member of the California State Senate, filed a lawsuit against the order. In 1983, an injunction against the DOJ was issued by U.S. District Judge Raul Anthony Ramirez. In 1986, the Supreme Court of the United States agreed to hear the case; on 28 April 1987, in Meese v. Keene, it ruled five to three in favor of the DOJ.

U.S. Senator Ted Kennedy hosted a screening of the film for members of the United States Senate Committee on the Judiciary. John Roberts stated that he expected a film to be banned in the Soviet Union, but not the United States. The Canadian government requested for the order to be rescinded.

== Accolades ==
If You Love This Planet was the seventh film by the NFB to receive an Academy Award. Nash thanked Reagan in her Oscar acceptance speech for the added publicity.

Award	Date of ceremony	Category	Recipient(s)	Result	Ref.
Academy Awards	April 11, 1983	Best Documentary Short	If You Love This Planet	Won	

== Legacy ==
In 1992, Caldicott published the book, If You Love This Planet: A Plan to Heal the Earth and, from July 2008 to November 2012, hosted a weekly radio program called If You Love This Planet.

== See also ==
- Eight Minutes to Midnight: A Portrait of Dr. Helen Caldicott, a 1981 feature-length documentary film.
- Nuclear Addiction: Dr. Rosalie Burtell on the Cost of Deterrence (Nash, 1986).
- A Writer in the Nuclear Age, featuring author Margaret Laurence (Nash, 1985).

== Works cited ==
- Beard, William; White, Jerry, eds. (2002). North of Everything: English-Canadian Cinema Since 1980. The University of Alberta Press. ISBN 0-88864-398-5.
- Evans, Gary (1991). In the National Interest: A Chronicle of the National Film Board of Canada from 1949 to 1989. University of Toronto Press. ISBN 0802027849.
