= Listed buildings in Borden, Kent =

Civil Parish in Kent, England

Borden is a village and civil parish in the Swale District of Kent, England. It contains 36 listed buildings that are recorded in the National Heritage List for England. Of these one is grade I, four are grade II* and 31 are grade II.

This list is based on the information retrieved online from Historic England.

== Key ==
| Grade | Criteria |
|---|---|
| I | Buildings that are of exceptional interest |
| II* | Particularly important buildings of more than special interest |
| II | Buildings that are of special interest |

== Listing ==
| Name | Grade | Location | Type | Completed (Note: The date given is the date used by Historic England as significant for the initial building or that of an important part in the structure's description.) | Date designated | Grid ref. (Note: The grid reference is based on the British national grid reference system, sometimes known as OSGB36, used by the Ordnance Survey.) Geo-coordinates | Notes | Entry number (Note: The "List Entry Number" is a unique number assigned to each listed building and scheduled monument by Historic England.) | Image | Wikidata |
|---|---|---|---|---|---|---|---|---|---|---|
| Bannister Hall | II | Bannister Hill | | | 27 November 1984 | TQ8869662643; 51°19′54″N 0°42′26″E | | 1069422 | Upload Photo | Q26322412 |
| 241, Borden Lane | II | 241, Borden Lane | | | 27 November 1984 | TQ8876162708; 51°19′56″N 0°42′30″E | | 1185676 | Upload Photo | Q26480986 |
| 245 and 247, Borden Lane | II | 245 and 247, Borden Lane | | | 24 January 1967 | TQ8875862689; 51°19′55″N 0°42′29″E | | 1069423 | Upload Photo | Q26322414 |
| Cryalls Farmhouse | II | Borden Lane, Sittingbourne | | | 10 September 1951 | TQ8902663363; 51°20′17″N 0°42′44″E | | 1061039 | Upload Photo | Q26314175 |
| Posiers | II | Borden Lane | | | 27 August 1952 | TQ8897462952; 51°20′03″N 0°42′41″E | | 1185698 | Upload Photo | Q26481006 |
| Chestnut Street Farmhouse | II | Chestnut Street | | | 24 January 1967 | TQ8713063660; 51°20′28″N 0°41′07″E | | 1069384 | Upload Photo | Q26322340 |
| Dumbles Tudor Rose Cottage | II | Chestnut Street | | | 27 August 1952 | TQ8757863878; 51°20′35″N 0°41′31″E | | 1069381 | Upload Photo | Q26322335 |
| Hook's Hole | II* | Chestnut Street | | | 27 August 1952 | TQ8760863898; 51°20′36″N 0°41′32″E | | 1069424 | Upload Photo | Q17546302 |
| Olde Houses | II | Chestnut Street | | | 24 January 1967 | TQ8759263890; 51°20′35″N 0°41′31″E | | 1069382 | Upload Photo | Q26322338 |
| Olstede | II* | Chestnut Street | | | 27 August 1952 | TQ8755863860; 51°20′34″N 0°41′30″E | | 1069383 | Upload Photo | Q17546294 |
| The Thatched Cottage | II | Chestnut Wood Lane | | | 27 November 1984 | TQ8712063454; 51°20′22″N 0°41′06″E | | 1069385 | Upload Photo | Q26322342 |
| Heart's Delight House | II | Heart's Delight Road | | | 27 August 1952 | TQ8857362113; 51°19′37″N 0°42′19″E | | 1343886 | Upload Photo | Q26627654 |
| Filmer House | II | Hearts Delight | | | 27 August 1952 | TQ8856062198; 51°19′39″N 0°42′18″E | | 1069386 | Upload Photo | Q26322344 |
| Sharp's House | II | Hearts Delight | | | 24 January 1967 | TQ8866462293; 51°19′42″N 0°42′24″E | | 1343885 | Upload Photo | Q26627653 |
| Eyehorne Hatch Farmhouse | II | Munsgore Road | | | 27 November 1984 | TQ8722462559; 51°19′53″N 0°41′10″E | | 1069387 | Upload Photo | Q26322346 |
| Hoad House | II | Oad Street | | | 27 November 1984 | TQ8702562099; 51°19′38″N 0°40′59″E | | 1069388 | Upload Photo | Q26322348 |
| The Olde House | II | Oad Street | | | 27 November 1984 | TQ8705562140; 51°19′39″N 0°41′00″E | | 1299557 | Upload Photo | Q26586950 |
| Yew Tree Cottage | II* | Oad Street | | | 24 January 1967 | TQ8686262154; 51°19′40″N 0°40′51″E | | 1343887 | Upload Photo | Q17546496 |
| Yew Tree Cottage | II | Pond Road | | | 27 November 1984 | TQ8809262889; 51°20′02″N 0°41′55″E | | 1069389 | Upload Photo | Q26322350 |
| Barn 30 Yards East of Sutton Baron | II | Sutton Baron Road | | | 27 November 1984 | TQ8797861940; 51°19′32″N 0°41′48″E | | 1343890 | Upload Photo | Q26627657 |
| Stables 30 Yards East of Sutton Baron | II | Sutton Baron Road | | | 27 November 1984 | TQ8796761926; 51°19′31″N 0°41′47″E | | 1185875 | Upload Photo | Q26481168 |
| Sutton Baron and Sutton Baron Hall | II | Sutton Baron Road | | | 27 August 1952 | TQ8793761948; 51°19′32″N 0°41′46″E | | 1069392 | Upload Photo | Q26322356 |
| Wheelhouse 10 Yards North of Sutton Barn | II | Sutton Baron Road | | | 27 November 1984 | TQ8793161967; 51°19′33″N 0°41′45″E | | 1299467 | Upload Photo | Q26586867 |
| Apple Tree Cottage the Cottage | II | The Street | | | 24 January 1967 | TQ8825462915; 51°20′03″N 0°42′04″E | | 1343889 | Upload Photo | Q26627656 |
| Bloumfield | II | The Street | | | 24 January 1967 | TQ8870462732; 51°19′57″N 0°42′27″E | | 1185794 | Upload Photo | Q26481092 |
| Church of St Peter and St Paul | I | The Street | church building | | 24 January 1967 | TQ8823862981; 51°20′05″N 0°42′03″E | | 1185731 | Church of St Peter and St Paul More images | Q17530086 |
| Forge 5 Yards East of Forge House | II | The Street | | | 27 November 1984 | TQ8829662941; 51°20′04″N 0°42′06″E | | 1185833 | Upload Photo | Q26481127 |
| Forge House and Barrow House and Railings to North | II | The Street | | | 27 November 1984 | TQ8827962948; 51°20′04″N 0°42′05″E | | 1069391 | Upload Photo | Q26322355 |
| Harman's Corner | II | The Street | | | 24 January 1967 | TQ8872262726; 51°19′56″N 0°42′28″E | | 1069390 | Upload Photo | Q26322353 |
| Holly Tree Cottage | II | The Street | | | 27 November 1984 | TQ8831662958; 51°20′04″N 0°42′07″E | | 1343888 | Upload Photo | Q26627655 |
| Street Farm House | II | The Street | | | 24 January 1967 | TQ8823062899; 51°20′02″N 0°42′03″E | | 1185802 | Upload Photo | Q26481099 |
| Borden Hall | II* | Wises Lane | | | 27 August 1952 | TQ8820963019; 51°20′06″N 0°42′02″E | | 1185884 | Upload Photo | Q17546366 |
| Dovecot 15 Yards North of Borden Hall | II | Wises Lane | | | 27 November 1984 | TQ8821363048; 51°20′07″N 0°42′02″E | | 1343891 | Upload Photo | Q26627658 |
| Oak House | II | Wises Lane | | | 27 November 1984 | TQ8831663033; 51°20′07″N 0°42′07″E | | 1069393 | Upload Photo | Q26322358 |
| Thatch Cottage | II | Wises Lane | | | 27 November 1984 | TQ8838363135; 51°20′10″N 0°42′11″E | | 1069394 | Upload Photo | Q26322360 |
| Wren's Farmhouse | II | Wren's Road | | | 27 November 1984 | TQ8837161806; 51°19′27″N 0°42′08″E | | 1185890 | Upload Photo | Q26481181 |

== See also ==
- Grade I listed buildings in Kent
- Grade II* listed buildings in Kent

== Sources ==
- Newman, John (2013) [1969], Kent: North-East and East, The Buildings of England, New Haven and London: Yale University Press, ISBN 978-0-300-18506-5
