= The Famine Within =

Canadian documentary film

- Directed by: Katherine Gilday
- Written by: Katherine Gilday
- Produced by: Katherine Gilday; Signe Johansson
- Starring: Rebecca Jenkins
- Cinematography: Joan Hutton
- Edited by: Petra Vallier
- Music by: Russell Walker
- Production company: National Film Board of Canada
- Distributed by: Direct Cinema
- Release date: 1990
- Running time: 81 minutes
- Country: Canada
- Language: English

The Famine Within is a Canadian documentary film, directed by Katherine Gilday and released in 1990. The film explores the issue of women's body image, and the prevalence of eating disorders. The film was narrated by Rebecca Jenkins.The Famine Within is an exploration of the contemporary obsession with body size and shape among North American women. Through the use of conventional documentary interviews and narration in conjunction with striking evocative imagery, the film presents women sharing their own experiences suffering with an eating disorder. The direct testimony of many women who have suffered from the body obsession – dancers, mothers, career women, athletes, bulimics, fat women, anorexics, young girls - with the views of leading experts, this work explores the kind of hunger that cannot be satisfied by food. The film is less about illness associated with food, but more raises questions about why so many women are worried about gaining weight or “being fat” The film premiered at the 1990 Festival of Festivals. It was subsequently broadcast by TVOntario.

== Significance ==
The Famine Within was significant film for the time as it was a direct commentary on the rising numbers of eating disorders among women. The film explores the effects of an ideal feminine beauty on girls and women today, as well as, the social and ideological consequences of their obsession with diet and exercise. Among the many matters discussed are contemporary notions of the superwoman (an image combining thinness and status); the muddled and extreme moral judgments placed on fatness and obesity in our culture; the relation of the Garden of Eden myth to contemporary concepts relating women to food and nature; the ideological implications of the current “fitness” craze. The film is less about illness associated with food, but more raises questions about why so many women are worried about gaining weight or “being fat”.

== Participants ==
Written by producer-director Katherine Gilday and narrated by actress Rebecca Jenkins featuring various models filmed in a studio. The various women interviewed are all different ages, shapes, and sizes; they range from therapists to patients, from teachers to pupils, from experts to amateurs, and from little girls to young women to gray eminences. With the exception of Paul Ernsberger who is a medical researcher all the participants in the film are women. (9) All the women who speak in the film are white and middle-class, with the exception of the original two-hour TV special.

== Themes ==
Eating disorders, body image, consumerism, mass media

== Awards ==
It won the Genie Award for Best Feature Length Documentary at the 12th Genie Awards.

== Praise and Criticism ==
Cynthia Lucia of Cinéaste states that the film is moving, highly-charged, and “conceptually and visually polished”. She also observed that a scene in which a model carries a perfectly-proportioned mannequin instead of a brief case is probably an attempt by Gilday to add visual variety, but instead seems “forced and almost silly”. - Cynthia Lucia, Cinéaste, NY: 1991.

In a subsequent interview with Katherine Gilday in Cinéaste, she refers to a critic at The Village Voice who was concerned that The Famine Within only presents the internal psychological issues and concerns regarding women’s relationship with their weight. Gilday believes she was clearly portraying a “culturally-determined mode of oppression” (5).

Some criticism the film received was that it did not attempt to discuss how cultures outside North America approach the issue of women and weight.(10) In addition, Jonathan Rosenbaum a feminist film scholar criticized the film for its lack of diversity in subjects, featuring only white middle-class women in the 90-minute version. However the full two-hour TV special did hear from women of colour.

The film was praised by Gail Vanstone in her dissertation on Studio D’s films stating that it was “a meticulous well researched documentary that analyses the contemporary problem of North American women’s self image. Mostly composed of talking heads the famine within nevertheless manages to hold together remarkably well. The film presents the case that the modern image of the tall, rail thin supermodel runs counter to nature and ideology and that women are tyrannized by cultural ideals of beauty imposed upon them by patriarchy and the diet industry to the point where one painfully thin young women (who speaks for many) say “I’d rather be dead than fat’”.
