= Heart's Delight, Swale =

Coordinates: 51.33°N 0.71°E

Heart's Delight
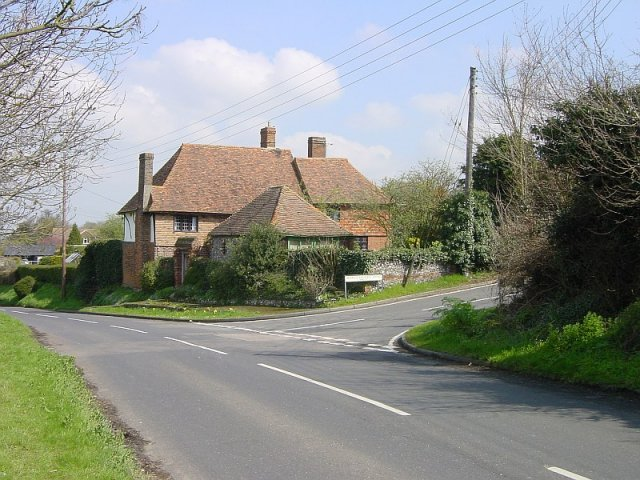
- Hearts Delight House

- Location within Kent
- OS grid reference: TQ8862
- Civil parish: Borden
- District: Swale
- Shire county: Kent
- Region: South East
- Country: England
- Sovereign state: United Kingdom
- Post town: Sittingbourne
- Postcode district: ME9
- Police: Kent
- Fire: Kent
- Ambulance: South East Coast

Heart's Delight is a settlement in the civil parish of Borden, in the Swale district, in Kent, England, located to the south of Sittingbourne. Heart's Delight Road, leading to it, has the postal address of Tunstall.

According to Edward Hasted, in 1798, Heart's Delight was a small hamlet in the parish of Borden. Wrens farm was an estate in 1664 (but called 'Rains Farm') and was owned by a squire from Tunstall.

There are four Grade II listed houses in the village; 'Hearts Delight House', 'Filmer House', 'Sharp's House', and 'Wren's Farmhouse'.

There is a similarly-known settlement near Barham in the City of Canterbury district of Kent
