= Tanya Ballantyne =

Canadian film director

Tanya Ballantyne (May 4, 1944 - June 18, 2015), also known later in her career as Tanya Ballantyne Tree, was a Canadian film director, most noted for her 1967 documentary film The Things I Cannot Change.

Created for the National Film Board of Canada, the film was broadcast by CBC Television on May 3, 1967, as an episode of the anthology series Festival, and received a special mention from the jury at the 1967 Montreal International Film Festival.

However, with the film having generated some controversy around whether it was exploitative of stars Kenneth and Gertrude Bailey, she opted to concentrate on raising her family with her then-husband Bruce Mackay, and did not return to filmmaking until deciding in the 1980s to track down the Baileys to update their story in a new film, Courage to Change. Having divorced from Mackay, she added Tree to her surname at this time, telling the press that she wanted to be known by a surname that she had chosen for herself, instead of being defined solely by the surnames of her father and ex-husband.

She subsequently directed the documentary films Nurses Care: One Day at a Time, Niagara Falls and Ted Allan: Minstrel Boy of the 20th Century, before her death in 2015.
