= Wisecracks =

- Directed by: Gail Singer
- Produced by: Susan Cavan; Rina Fraticelli; Signe Johansson; Gail Singer; Ginny Stikeman
- Cinematography: Zoe Dirse; Robert Fresco
- Edited by: Gordon McClellan
- Production companies: Citytv; National Film Board of Canada
- Release date: September 1991 (Toronto)
- Running time: 90 minutes
- Country: Canada
- Language: English

Wisecracks is a Canadian documentary film, directed by Gail Singer and released in 1991. The film profiles a number of women who were active in comedy in the late 1980s and early 1990s, including Joy Behar, Phyllis Diller, Ellen DeGeneres, Whoopi Goldberg, Geri Jewell, Paula Poundstone, Sandra Shamas and Jenny Jones.

The film premiered at the 1991 Festival of Festivals. Singer's comedy film True Confections was also screened at the same festival, making her the first filmmaker in the festival's history to have both a documentary and a narrative fiction film screened at the festival in the same year.

== Cast ==
- JoAnne Astrow
- Joy Behar
- Maria Callous
- Dreenagh Darrell
- Ellen DeGeneres
- Phyllis Diller
- Whoopi Goldberg
- Dorothy Hart
- Geri Jewell
- Jenny Jones
- Maxine Lapiduss
- Jenny Lecoat
- Emily Levine
- Paula Poundstone
- Sandra Shamas
- Carrie Snow
- Pam Stone
- Deborah Theaker
- Robin Tyler
- Kim Wayans
- Lotus Weinstock
- Cast of Faking It
  - Mary-Anne Fahey
  - Wendy Harmer
  - Gina Riley
  - Magda Szubanski
- Archival footage
  - Gracie Allen
  - Eve Arden
  - Lucille Ball
  - Fanny Brice
  - Carol Burnett
  - Mae West

== Reception ==
=== Critical response ===
Janet Maslin of The New York Times wrote: "How do female stand-up comics differ from their male counterparts? What does comedy mean to them? How do they feel about their audiences and about being able to make those audiences laugh? These not altogether burning questions are addressed by Gail Singer's Wisecracks, a full-length documentary that is noticeably bigger than its subject. Still, Ms. Singer manages to offer an interesting overview, not to mention scattered moments of insight and humor."

=== Awards ===
The film subsequently received a Genie Award nomination for Best Feature Length Documentary at the 13th Genie Awards in 1992.
