= Federal Women's Film Program =

Canadian film organization

- Location: Canada
- Official language: English, French

The Federal Women's Film Program (FWFP) was created in 1980 by the Canadian government as a partnership of federal ministries and agencies purposed to create and distribute films about the status of women. Studio D handled the administration of it in both French and English. FWFP was created to address the demand for women-centered films and filmmaking opportunities for women. In 1987, executive producer Rina Fraticelli began "producing shorter, basic information films dealing with issues of immediate concern to Canadian women, including domestic violence, reproductive choice, career choice, health care, and aging.”

The FWFP was associated with Studio D and separate from its formal budgetary structure. Studio D provided leadership and personnel in developing FWFP, as well as sharing its physical space with the program. The National Film Board of Canada (NFB) matched funds provided by other federal departments to support the production of films on women's issues. Some of these films were internal training films, while others were related to important messages about each department's own goals.

- Agriculture and Agri-Food Canada
- The Public Service Commission of Canada
- Status of Women in Canada
- Environment Canada
- Justice Canada
- Health Canada: Seniors Secretariat; Family Violence Prevention Division; Family and Child Health Programs
- Human Resources and Labour Canada: Women's Program; Status of Disabled Persons Secretariat; Women's Bureau; Employment of Equity Branch
- Ministry of Public Security
- Industry and Science Canada, Entrepreneurship and Small Business Office, Federal Business Development Bank, and Federal Office of Regional Development (Quebec)

== Significance ==
Throughout the 1980s, the FWFP made a variety of films, including Not a Love Story: A Film About Pornography, (1981) a documentary on pornography and the sex trade. Other FWFP films have discussed nontraditional employment for women, employment for Indigenous women, and employment for disabled women. In 1986, the FWFP funded a film training project through Studio D, extending its mandate to provide training for women filmmakers.

== Themes ==
Themes covered by the FWFP productions are wide-ranging, though the program's mandate was to ensure the production of timely films that reflected women's perspectives on current issues facing women and society. Some of the films focused on issues faced by young people as they assumed increasingly adult responsibilities. Issues explored included representation of women in the fields of math and science, the effects of violence in media on young consumers, and the challenges of unemployment. These documentaries were recommended for secondary school students and were accompanied by interactive guides for classroom participation. Other themes of FWFP productions included domestic abuse, services available to victims, and tributes to Indigenous women.

== Filmography ==
=== Stand-alone films ===
- Attention: Women at Work!, 1983. Directed by Anne Henderson, produced by Margaret Pettigrew. 28 min.
- Head Start: Meeting the Computer Challenge, 1984. Directed and produced by Diane Beaudry. 27 min.
- Doctor, Lawyer, Indian Chief, 1986. Directed by Carole Geddes, produced by Barbara Janes. 29 min.
- The Impossible Takes a Little Longer, 1986. Directed by Anne Henderson, produced by Barbara Janes. 46 min.
- No Time to Stop, 1990. Directed by Helene Klodawsky, produced by Chantal Bowen. 29 min.

=== Series ===
- (International Youth Year Training Program) Co-produced by Micheline Le Guillou and Gerry Rogers.
  - Beyond Memory, 1986. Directed by Louise Lamarre. 14 min.
  - Children of War, 1986. Directed by Premika Ratnam. 25 min.
  - First Take Double Take, 1986. Directed by Paula Fairfield. 9 min.
  - Thin Dreams, 1986. Directed by Susie Mah. 21 min.
- Next Step series. Directed by Tina Horne, co-produced by Gerry Rogers and Tina Horne.
  - Moving On, 1986. 28 min.
  - A Safe Distance, 1986. 28 min.
  - Sylvie's Story, 1986. 28 min.
- Gathering Strength series.
  - In Her Chosen Field, 1989. Directed by Barbara Evans, produced by Chantal Bowen. 28 min.
  - A Time to Reap, 1989. Directed by Dagmar Teufel, produced by Chantal Bowen. 28 min.
- Elder Women series. Produced by Chantal Bowen.
  - The Power of Time, 1989. Directed by Liette Aubin. 29 min.
  - Pills Unlimited, 1990. Directed by Sylvie Van Brabant. 29 min.
  - When the Day Comes, 1991. Directed by Sharon McGowan. 29 min.
- Women and Work series. Produced by Chantal Bowen.
  - A Balancing Act, 1992. Directed by Helena Cynamon. 24 min.
  - The Glass Ceiling, 1992. Directed by Sophie Bissonnette, 28 min.
  - Careers to Discover, 1993. Directed by Ginette Pellerin. 24 min.
  - A Web Not a Ladder, 1993. Directed by Bonnie Dickie. 24 min.

== Selected film synopses ==
Enough is Enough (1996), directed by Nicole Giguere

Alternate Route (1997), directed by Denise Withers

Taking Charge (1996), directed by Claudette Jaiko

== Awards and honours ==
- The Impossible Takes a Little Longer (1987): Medikinale/International Medical and Scientific Film Festival - Prix Leonardo, Honourable Mention. Parma, Italy.
