= Abortion: Stories From North and South =

- Directed by: Gail Singer
- Written by: Gail Singer
- Produced by: Signe Johansson, Gail Singer
- Cinematography: Susan Trow
- Edited by: Toni Trow
- Music by: Maribeth Solomon, Micky Erbe
- Production companies: National Film Board of Canada, Studio D
- Distributed by: National Film Board of Canada
- Release date: October 1984
- Running time: 55 Minutes
- Country: Canada
- Language: English
- Budget: $241,705

Abortion: Stories from North and South is a Canadian documentary film directed by Gail Singer and produced by Studio D, the women's unit of the National Film Board of Canada. The film is a cross-cultural survey filmed in Ireland, Japan, Thailand, Peru, Colombia, and Canada that depicts the realities women face in accessing medical abortion services. The film outlines the historical role of the church, state, and medical establishments in creating regulations surrounding abortion.

== Synopsis ==
The film provides a historical and contemporary overview of European, Asian and North American women’s approaches to terminating unwanted pregnancies despite legislative and stigmatic barriers. The film further depicts how abortion transcends race, religion and social class, and how differences in the practice and perception of abortion are mainly in the degree of secrecy and danger accompanying it. During the shooting of the film, the subject of abortion often had to be disguised or downplayed due to the polarizing content of the film.

== Production ==
Studio D created the film with a budget of $241,705 (equivalent to $654,917 in 2025). It is the first film produced by the NFB with an all-woman crew.

== Release ==
The Canadian Broadcasting Corporation refused to show the film stating that it was "unbalanced" and the president of the Canadian Conference of Catholic Bishops stated that it was a "sleazy trick" to show two abortion films before the pope's arrival in Canada.

== Awards and honours ==
- Nominated for Best Documentary at the Chicago International Film Festival (1984)
- Blue Ribbon Award - Category: Human Sexuality, Itinerant - American Film and Video Festival, May 27 to June (1986), New York - USA
- ADATE Award - Category: Best Editing (Toni Trow), Festival de l'audiovisuel québécois ADATE (Association pour le développement de l'audiovisuel et de la technologie en éducation, October 23 (1985), Montréal - Canada
- Certificate of Merit Award to Gail Singer - Category: Films made by the State, Festival de l'audiovisuel québécois ADATE (Association pour le développement de l'audiovisuel et de la technologie en éducation, October 23 (1985), Montréal - Canada
- Certificate of Special Merit, Academy of Motion Picture - Special Tribute, June 17 (1985), Hollywood - USA
- Grand Prize - with a cash prize of 1,000 $US, Golden Gate Awards Competition & International Film Festival, April 11 to 27 (1985), San Francisco - USA
- Public's Award, Visions du Réel / Festival international du cinéma documentaire, October 13 to 20 (1984), Nyon - Switzerland

== Reception ==
The film received generally favorable reviews from critics. A review from the Psychology of Women Quarterly praised the film for its impact and scope through the usage of on-the-spot interviews and case studies, stating “this powerful film, complete with grisly scenes, is highly recommended.” The film was further praised by Elizabeth G. Paddock in the Audiovisual Review, asserting that “the results of governmental acceptance or denial of abortion and the effects upon women’s health care are clearly portrayed, often with disturbing results.” Paddock praised the film’s approach to highlighting the realities of abortion, stating that “as a film documentary designed to promote unemotional and rational consideration of the situation, [Abortion: Stories from North and South] is moving and unmoralistic.” The film was praised by Margaret Cooper in Cineaste for refraining from “expressing a narrowly partisan, single-issue stance. It concentrates instead on actual conditions and their significance for women." Cooper particularly highlighted the effectiveness of the voiceover narration and visuals, stating that they “[bolster] the film’s anthropological approach to its subject and its underlying argument for safe, accessible medical care for all women.” Contrarily, Brenda Longfellow stated that the film occasionally fostered a Western ethnocentric perspective, in which "it is clearest in the contrast between the sequences that deal with abortion in the West -- the ones constructed in part as fiction -- and those located in the underdeveloped world in which the point of view is that of an intrepid Margaret Mead, anthropological and distanced, consolidated by the relentless presence of voice-over."

== Works cited ==
- Evans, Gary (1991). In the National Interest: A Chronicle of the National Film Board of Canada from 1949 to 1989. University of Toronto Press. ISBN 0802027849.
