= Michelle Mohabeer =

Canadian filmmaker and writer

- Born: 1961 (age 64–65); Guyana, South America
- Occupations: filmmaker, writer

Michelle Mohabeer is a Canadian filmmaker and writer. Her films have received many rewards including the Isabella Liddell Art Award and the 5 Feminist Minutes Award. Her first work, Exposure (1990) was produced through the National Film Board's Studio D. During and after creating several films, she has also served as an adjunct lecturer at the following post-secondary institutions: University of Toronto, Trent University, University of Western Ontario, Ryerson University and Sheridan College.

Mohabeer's film work has been displayed at over 150 festivals, conferences and galleries located across 18 countries from multiple continents. Her films have been collected by over sixty university libraries across North America, the Caribbean and Australia.

== Early life and education ==
Mohabeer was born in Guyana, South America in 1961. She moved to Toronto, Ontario, Canada in 1974 at the age of 13. In 1986, she successfully received her BA in film studies from Carleton University. Mohabeer earned her second degree in 1998; it was a Master's of Fine Arts in film production from York University. In 2005, she received a PhD in culture and communication from the University of Toronto with a focus on film studies.

== Career ==
Mohabeer started her film-making career working for the National Film Board in Studio D. She created her first short film Exposure (1990) for the series Five Feminist Minutes. This film was a huge success, not only for its content, but for the fact that this was "the first up-front lesbian film from the NFB" and the fact that the film was made by, in the words of Film Critic Thomas Waugh, a "lesbian artist of colour in the Canadian canon." Following the release of her film she had a brief employment with CKLN radio. Four years later, she released her second film Coconut/Cane & Cutlass (1994); due to the great success of her first film, the budget for her second feature was almost nine times larger allowing her to shoot in Canada and Guyana. In 1996, she created two more films Two/Doh and Child-play (1997); Two/Doh was noted for being produced at very low cost, while Child-play was Mohabeer's first attempt at a drama film. During the nineteen-nineties she was active on several arts community boards in Toronto, frequently serving as administrator.

In the new millennium, Michelle Mohabeer directed several more films. In 2001, she created the film Tracing Soul. In 2003, she wrote and directed the film Echoes. Finally, in 2008, she made the film Blu In You.

Throughout her career as a filmmaker Professor Mohabeer has also taught the next generation of filmmakers. She has appeared as a guest lecturer or hosted workshops at several post-secondary institutions. She has also taught classes, namely Film Studies at Innis College, Cinema Studies at the University of Toronto, and York University and Film Production at Ryerson University. Currently, Professor Mohabeer teaches in the Communication Studies and Humanities departments at York University.

== Cinematic style and influence ==
Many critics have noted that Mohabeer's films frequently explore the themes of "the diversity of cultural identity and the politics of gender, sexuality and colonialism." Film Scholar Tara Atluri, has argued that Mohabeer's films also feature several links to the Indo-Caribbean film tradition.

== Filmography ==
Year	Title	Credit Listing	Description
1990	Exposure	Filmmaker, researcher, scriptwriter, director	Experimental documentary on the issues of race and racism, sexuality and homophobia, cultural and ethnic identity.
1994	Coconut/Cane & Cutlass	Scriptwriter, director, producer	Poetic thoughts on exile, displacement and nationhood from an Indo-Caribbean lesbian immigrant; "raising many questions about the confluence of culture and sexuality." This film contains elements of an autobiography, a historical documentary and an experimental film; represented with the use of landscape, histories, archived images, voices, theatrical dances and movement scenes, all of which are poetically fragmented. Film critic Thomas Waugh has described this film as a "lush and complex first-person essay on lesbian desire and genealogy in the context of postcolonial exile."
1996	Two/Doh		Poetic pastiche about the intersection of cultural and erotic connections between women of different cultural origins.
1997	Child-play	Director, producer, scriptwriter, production designer, researcher	Allegorical dream tale about past youth superimposing on the present.
2001	Tracing Soul		Artistic poetry about the female form using lines, shadows, music, text, fragments and gestures.
2003	Echoes	Director, scriptwriter	Main character's reflection on her past.
2008	Blu In You	Scriptwriter, producer, director, designer, cinematographer	The film covers the old and modern representations of the black queer female body, sexuality and subjectivity. To cover both, the film jumps between distant points of history in the story.

== Awards and nominations ==
Several of Mohabeer's film have earned international awards and honorable mentions at film festivals across the globe; these films include Child-play, Coconut/Cane & Cutlass and Exposure. Exposure in particular has received much recognition, including the NFB's Five Feminist Minutes Award.

Year	Organization	Awards	Film
1989	National Film Board of Canada -Studio D	5 Feminist Minutes Award	Exposure
1990	Black Film/Video Network	Award of Recognition	Exposure
1991	41st Berlin International Film Festival	Official Selection Certificate	Exposure
1994	32nd Ann Arbor Film Festival	Isabella Liddell Art Award of Excellence	Coconut/Cane & Cutlass
1994	Curve magazine, San Francisco	Top Ten Independent Short Film	Coconut/Cane & Cutlass
1995	10th Turin International Film Festival	Special Mention in Documentary Category	Coconut/Cane & Cutlass
1998	11th Annual Images Film & Video Festival	Honourable Mention Certificate for Best Direction	Child-Play
