= I'll Find a Way =

1977 film

- Directed by: Beverly Shaffer
- Produced by: Beverly Shaffer; Yuki Yoshida
- Starring: Nadia DeFranco
- Cinematography: Nesya Blue
- Edited by: Ginny Stikeman
- Music by: Larry Crosley
- Distributed by: National Film Board of Canada
- Release date: 1977
- Running time: 26 minutes
- Country: Canada
- Language: English

I'll Find a Way is a 1977 Canadian short documentary film directed by Beverly Shaffer about nine-year-old Nadia DeFranco, who has spina bifida. Produced by Studio D, the women's unit of the National Film Board of Canada, the film won an Oscar in 1978 for Best Live Action Short Film.

== Just a Wedding ==
In 1999, Shaffer completed Just a Wedding, a sequel to I'll Find a Way, revisiting DeFranco as she prepares to get married.
