= Violet McNaughton (activist) =

Canadian journalist and feminist

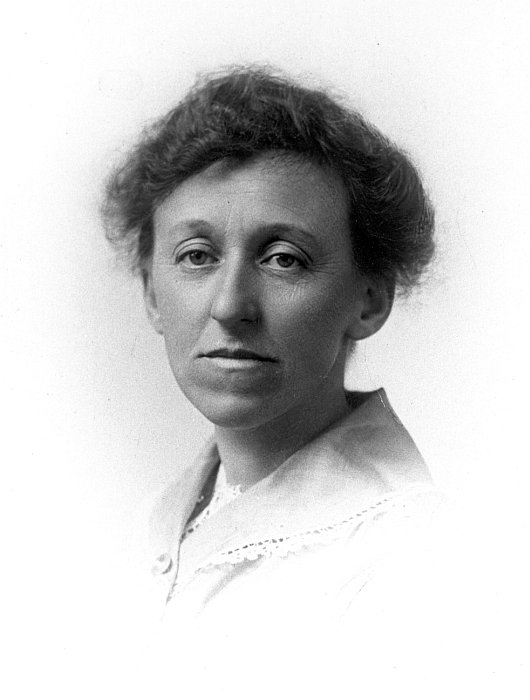
- McNaughton, c. 1910
- Born: Violet Clara Jackson; November 11, 1879; Borden, Kent, England
- Died: February 3, 1968 (aged 88); Saskatoon, Saskatchewan, Canada
- Occupations: activist, newspaper editor, journalist
- Years active: c. 1914–1959
- Spouse: John McNaughton (1910–1965; his death)

Violet Clara McNaughton (born Violet Clara Jackson; November 11, 1879 – February 3, 1968) was a Canadian journalist and agrarian feminist notable for co-establishing The Western Producer and contributing to its "Mainly for Women" pages from 1925 until her retirement in 1950. A settler and farmer of Harris, Saskatchewan (land of the Plains Cree), she was an active member of the Women's Section of the Canadian Council of Agriculture as well as the first president of the Women Grain Growers (WGG), a branch of the Saskatchewan Grain Growers Association (SGGA). McNaughton is considered the leader of women's suffrage in Saskatchewan and is recognized as the most influential Canadian farm woman of the 20th century. McNaughton was a known pacifist and supporter of women's suffrage and anti-war movements in Canada.

McNaughton focused on conditions of working class Anglo-European women and families in the Canadian Prairies. She was a self described "ardent feminist" and active supporter of women, egalitarian values and co-operation. Her presence as activist and farm woman defied the strong prejudice against women farmers and laborers present in western Canada.

== Personal life ==
Violet McNaughton Jackson was born in 1879 to Sedalia Jane Spittle and William Deleware Jackson, the eldest of three children. She lived in Borden, Kent until her emigration to Harris, Saskatchewan at age 30 in 1909, joining her father and brother Delamark who had both previously settled there.

In May 1910, she married homesteader John McNaughton. Soon after, McNaughton (nee Jackson) developed serious gynecological complications in 1911, resulting in infertility. By 1926, she had moved to Saskatoon independently and was occasionally travelling between her urban and rural life, balancing familial and career obligations. McNaughton described her marriage as a "fifty-fifty marriage" in 1934, seeing it as a partnership.

Although having no biological or adopted children, McNaughton is known to have been a mothering figure for several young people from the 1920s to 1930s.

== Career ==
She taught school for a time, was active politically, and was a political journalist and newspaper publisher.

=== Activism ===
McNaughton began her activist career in 1913, organizing a "women's congress" in association with the SGGA's (Saskatchewan Grain Growers Association) annual general meeting, known as the Women Grain Growers (WGG). She acted as the group's first president in 1914.

McNaughton helped organize women's chapters of United Farmers in Alberta, Manitoba and Ontario. She served as president of the Women's Section of the Canadian Council of Agriculture from 1919 to 1923.

Her activism included fighting to increase rural healthcare rights, primarily during the Spanish flu outbreak of 1918. During the drought and economic depression of the 1930s, McNaughton wrote in favour of co-operatives and farmers' rights.

In the 1940s, McNaughton's activism focused on supporting victims of World War 2 and the war effort. She urged women to join the armed forces and take up manufacturing jobs in the time of labor shortages. In the 1940s, she also began to support Métis and First Nations suffrage and social justice and supported calls for old-age pensions and non elite historical preservation.

=== Her journalism and The Western Producer ===
Before starting her journalism career, Violet McNaughton was an active spokesperson and member of Saskatchewan Grain Growers Association. In 1923, dissatisfied with the official newspaper of the SGGA, McNaughton and colleagues Harris Turner and A.P. "Pat" Waldron established The Progressive, an alternative paper built on principles of co-operation and advocating for farmers in Saskatchewan. The Progressive was a response to the growing unrest of farmers post World War 1 and its resulting recession, tariffs and grain prices. This paper would soon become the official newspaper of the SGGA, changing its name to The Western Producer (informally, The Producer) in 1924, distinguishing themselves from the similarly named Progressive Party, a federal political party. McNaughton's main contribution to the paper is as women's editor and creator of the widely successful "Mainly for Women" and "Young Co-operators" pages, which sought to make the lives of farm women and families better. These pages would grow to include a garden column, pattern service and a dating column "Mary Maple". After her retirement in 1950, McNaughton would often write "Jottings" of her travels through Canada as well as internationally, often promoting activism, peace and the anti-nuclear movement.

==== Mainly For Women ====
The Mainly For Women pages of the Western Producer were created in 1925 in attempt to boost female readership. Given McNaughton's reputation through her activism work, she was recruited into this endeavor, which quickly became a success. Initially working part time, this quickly became her full time occupation by 1926. Its pages included discussions on education, citizenship and co-operative marketing, along with discussion of current events and domestic life. The paper had as many as six pages and included an introduction by McNaughton, articles, and a popular advice column titled "Mail Bag" (also known as "Letter Box").

The first page of each edition contained a 300-500 word "Comment" by McNaughton. She used this to draw attention to specific topics and ended her entry with a question to be answered by submission in the Mail Bag column. Topics of interest included poetry, household advice, reports from farm women's organizations, and a garden forum. Despite the content not directly classified as only for white women, Native and Métis voices prevalent to the region were rarely acknowledged.

She retired from full time editorship in 1950, but wrote an occasional column until 1959.
