= Christene Browne =

Canadian film producer

Christene Browne was born on October 18, 1965 in Saint Kitts. is a Canadian director and writer. Browne is the first black woman to write, produce and direct a feature film in Canada.

== Biography ==
Born in St. Kitts in the Caribbean, Browne moved with her family to Canada in 1970. She spent her formative years in Regent Park, Canada's oldest and largest low-income community. It was in this Toronto community where the seeds of Browne's filmmaker career were planted. She participated and then led the Regent Park Video workshop project and contributed to the production of many documentary videos about the community. It was during this time Browne decided to go to film school. She attended the film program at Ryerson Polytechnic Institute. The first film she directed and produced was released in 1987, From Nevis To…, before creating her production company. Then later after leaving Ryerson, she worked for a small film company before starting her own production company, Syncopated Productions in 1990. Many of the films that she produces are documentaries but she has also produced short dramas and television series.

She was involved in the making of Luciano Berio’s: Sequenza X that was released in 1984, before she directed From Nevis To… in 1987. From Nevis To… won Best Canadian Feature Film from Reel Black Awards, was nominated Best Documentary from Yorkton Short Film Festival, and also was the Winner Visionary Award from The WIFF Foundation. But by 1990 she began creating her documentary films, mainly focusing on music and community. Brothers in Music (1990) debuted at the Toronto International Film Festival in 1991 and launched Browne's film career, Brothers in Music was also nominated for Best Documentary from the Yorkton Film Festival. No Choices (1993) (a segment of movie Five Feminist Minutes), from that time onward, she has consistently produced heartfelt work that has tackled hard-hitting difficult topics such as poverty and abortion. She has worked independently and has also done projects with the National Film Board of Canada and the Canadian Broadcast Corporation, OMNI TV and many others. Her films have won numerous awards and have been screened and broadcast all over the world. She also released Them That’s Not: Single Mothers and The Welfare System which won the Bronze Apple Award from the National Educational Film and Video Festival, Black Film makers Foundation, was nominated Best Documentary from Yorkton Short Film Festival, and was the Winner Special Jury Prize from Reel World Film Festival.

In 1999, Browne completed her first dramatic feature, Another Planet, and became the first Black woman to direct and write a feature film in Canada. Shortly After in 2001 she directed and produced A Way Out in 2001 which won Best Canadian Feature Film from Reel Black Awards. Browne completed Speaking in Tongues: The History of Language in 2008, an extensive documentary series that looks at the history of language from prehistoric time to the present day, for which she received the Women's International Film & Television Showcase (WIFTS) Foundation Best Documentary Award 2011. Her most recent film was an animated experimental short film called I See You Sister. It was released in 2025 and is already Winner of the Amsterdam New Cinema Film Festival 2025.

In addition to working as a filmmaker, Browne has also worked as curator and media arts instructor. Browne's first novel, Two Women, a cautionary tale about two women who share the same soul, was released in 2013. Browne now has two novels released, Two Women and Philomena (Unloved), both published by Second Story Press. She is now currently working on her third novel, 2084, while also teaching at Ryerson University.

Filmography

YEAR	TITLE	COMMENTS
1987	From Nevis to	Director, Producer (Documentary, Drama)
1990	Brothers in Music	Director, Producer (Music, Short)
1991	Jodie Drake: Blues in my Bread	Director, Producer
1993	Them That’s Not: Single Mothers and The Welfare System	Director (Documentary)
1993	No Choice	Director, Producer (Drama, Short, from Series: Five Feminist Minutes)
1999	Another Planet	Director, Writer, Producer (Drama)
2001	A Way Out	Director, Producer (Documentary)
2008	Speaking in Tongues: The History of Language	Director, Producer (Documentary Series)
2016	Mount Misery	Director, Writer, Producer (Drama, Short)
2019	Farewell Regent	Director, Producer (Documentary)
2021	Austin Clarke: Survivor of the Crossing	Director, Producer (Animated, Documentary)
2025	I See You Sister	Director, Producer (Experimental, Short, Animated)

Awards and Nominations

- Bronze Apple Award (National Educational Film And Video Festival)
- Black Filmmakers Foundation
- Nominated Best Documentary (Yorkton Short Film Festival)
- Winner Special Jury Prize (Reel World Film Festival)
- Best Canadian Feature Film (Reel Black Awards)
- Best Canadian Feature Film (Reel Black Awards)
- Nominated Best Documentary (Yorkton Short Film Festival)
- Winner Visionary Award (The WIFF Foundation)
- Winner Amsterdam New Cinema Film Festival
- Winner Best Film Prize Black International Cinema Berlin
