= Danaway =

Village in Kent, England

Coordinates: 51.3354°N 0.6714°E

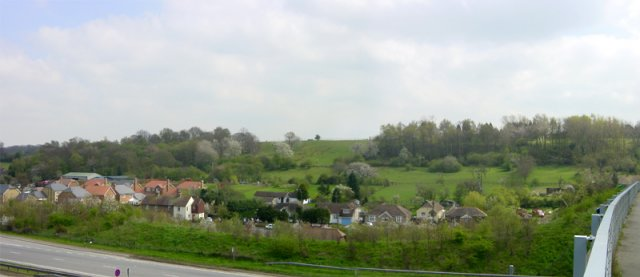
- Danaway

- Location within Kent
- OS grid reference: TQ8663
- District: Swale
- Shire county: Kent
- Region: South East
- Country: England
- Sovereign state: United Kingdom
- Post town: Sittingbourne
- Police: Kent
- Fire: Kent
- Ambulance: South East Coast

Danaway is a village near the A249 road and the M2 motorway, in the Swale district, in the English county of Kent. The nearest town is Sittingbourne. It is set in the base of a valley, with the oldest houses dating from the late 19th century.
