= Marie Annharte Baker =

Canadian poet & author (born 1942)

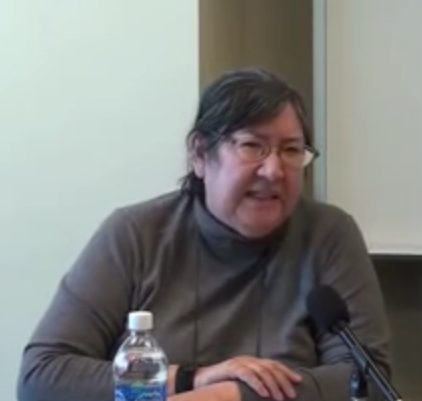
Marie Annharte Baker during a panel presentation at the Aboriginal Gathering 26 March 2009

Marie Annharte Baker (born 1942) is a Canadian Anishnabe (Ojibwa) poet and author, a cultural critic and activist, and a performance artist/contemporary storyteller.

Through books, poetry, essays, interviews and performance Annharte articulates and critiques life from western Canada, with a special focus on women, urban, Indigenous, disabilities, academic, and poverty-centric (or "street") awareness and issues/foibles.

== Life ==
Baker is from Little Saskatchewan First Nation and she was born in 1942 and grew up in Winnipeg, Manitoba. Her father was Irish and her mother was Anishinabe. Marie Annharte Baker was considered to be part of a specific Anishinabe nation, the Obibwa. She would spend her holidays with her Anishinabe grandparents on a reservation in Manitoba. She received what she considered an unsuccessful education at Brandon College, the University of British Columbia and the Simon Fraser University during the 1960s. Baker considers herself self-taught but she did return to education in the 1970s and this included a degree in English for the University of Winnipeg. After graduating, Baker became involved in Native American activism, and taught Native Studies at multiple colleges in Minneapolis. Baker was one of the first people in North America to teach a class entirely on Native American women. After her teaching career, Baker returned to Winnipeg and began to work as a community family advocate.

She has been associated with (studied or taught at) the University of Manitoba, University of Winnipeg, Brandon University, Augsburg College, and University of Minnesota. She has collaborated with or co-founded numerous groups of community-based writer activists, including Regina Aboriginal Writers Group and the Aboriginal Writers Collective of Manitoba. She was a founding member of the Canadian Indian Youth Council. Presently, she is organizing Nokomis Storyteller Theatre which features comic/clown and puppet performances. She also volunteered for Vancouver weekly radio program, When Spirit Whispers, interviewing Native people while discussing the bounds of Native art forms.

== Works ==
- Being on the Moon, Vancouver: Polestar, 1990; Vancouver: Raincoast Books, 2000
- Coyote Columbus Cafe, Winnipeg: Moonprint, 1994
- Exercises in Lip Pointing, Vancouver: New Star Books, 2003
- Indigena Awry, Vancouver: New Star Books, 2013
- Too Tough, 1990
- "Porkskin Panorama" Callalloo
- "Medicine Lives"
- "Borrowing Enemy Language"

== Awards ==
- 1990 National Film Board grant for Too Tough, her film celebrating the spiritual power of Native women to counter media victim image.
- 1991 City of Regina's writing award for Albeit Aboriginal, a script reclaiming voices of Native women.

== See also ==
- Canadian literature
- Canadian poetry
- List of Canadian poets
- List of Canadian writers
- List of writers from peoples indigenous to the Americas
