= Helen Thomas =

American journalist (1920–2013)

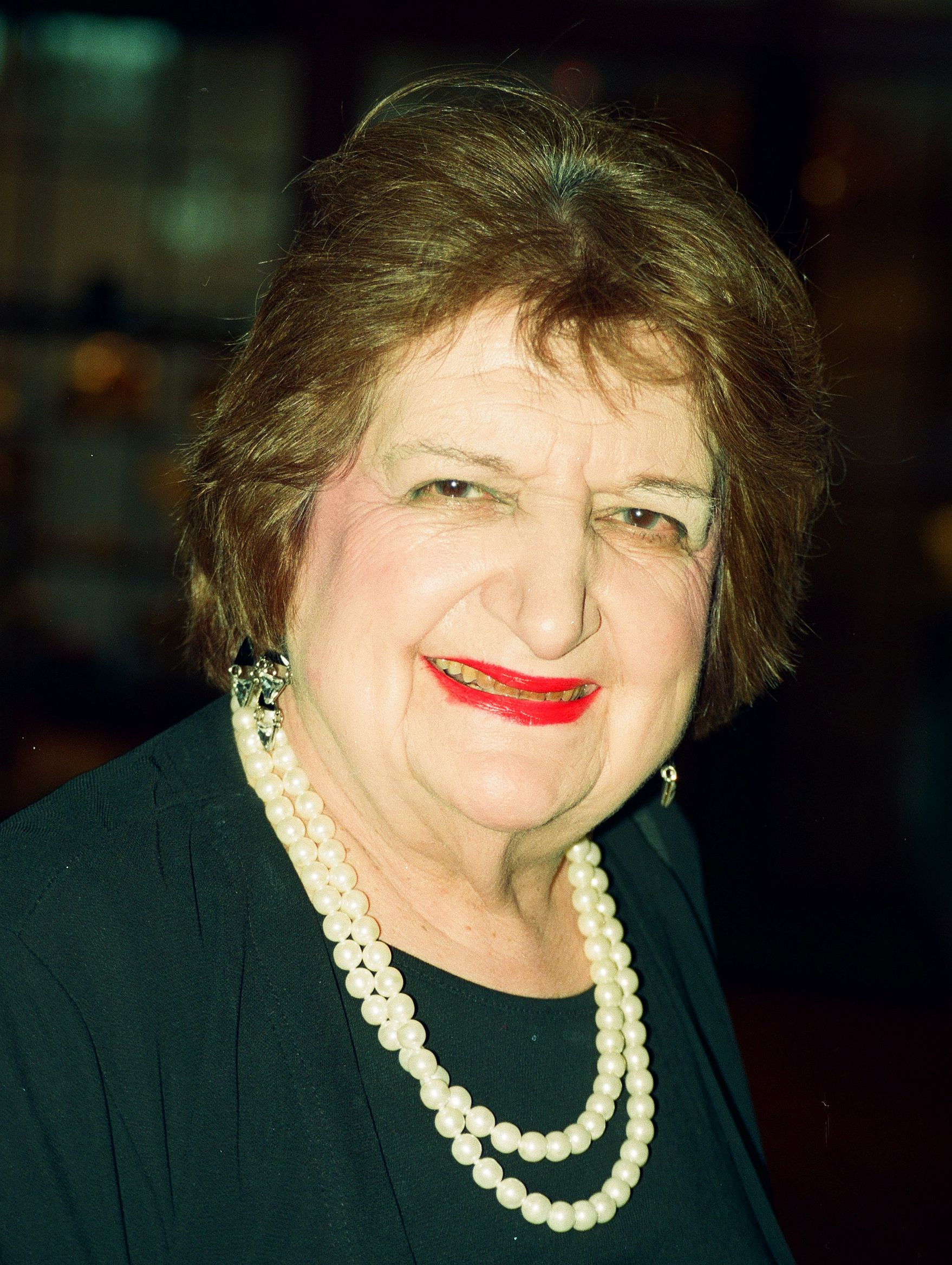
- Thomas in 2000
- Born: Helen Amelia Thomas; August 4, 1920; Winchester, Kentucky, U.S.
- Died: July 20, 2013 (aged 92); Washington, D.C., U.S.
- Education: Wayne State University (BA)
- Occupations: Author; journalist; columnist
- Years active: 1943–2013
- Known for: Pioneering female reporter; first female member of the White House press corps
- Spouse: Douglas B. Cornell (m. 1971; died 1982)

Helen Amelia Thomas (August 4, 1920 – July 20, 2013) was an American reporter and author, and a long-serving member of the White House press corps. She covered the White House during the administrations of ten U.S. presidents—from the beginning of the Kennedy administration to the second year of the Obama administration.

Thomas worked for the United Press and post-1958 successor United Press International (UPI) for 57 years, first as a correspondent, and later as White House bureau manager. She then served as a columnist for Hearst Newspapers from 2000 to 2010, writing on national affairs and the White House. Thomas was the first female officer of the National Press Club, the first female member and president of the White House Correspondents' Association and the first female member of the Gridiron Club. She wrote six books; her last (with co-author Craig Crawford) was Listen Up, Mr. President: Everything You Always Wanted Your President to Know and Do (2009).

Thomas retired from Hearst Newspapers on June 7, 2010, following controversial remarks she made about Israel in an impromptu, unstructured amateur short interview when solicited for "any comments on Israel," she replied, "tell them to get the hell out of Palestine." She then served as an opinion columnist for the Falls Church News-Press until February 2012.

== Early life and education ==
Born in Winchester, Kentucky, Thomas was the seventh of the nine children of George and Mary (Rowady) Thomas, Christian immigrants from Tripoli, Lebanon (then part of the Ottoman Empire). Thomas said her father's surname, "Antonious", was anglicized to "Thomas" when he entered the U.S. at Ellis Island, and that her parents could neither read nor write. Thomas was raised mainly in Detroit, Michigan, where her family moved when she was four years old, and where her father ran a grocery store. Of her experience growing up, Thomas said:

We were never hyphenated as Arab-Americans. We were American, and I have always rejected the hyphen and I believe all assimilated immigrants should not be designated ethnically. Or separated, of course, by race, or creed either. These are trends that ever try to divide us as a people.

She also said that in Detroit in the 1920s, she came home crying from school, "They wanted to make you feel you weren't 'American'... We were called 'garlic eaters' ". She was a member of the Antiochian Orthodox Church.

Thomas attended Detroit Public Schools, and decided to become a journalist while attending Eastern High School. She enrolled at Wayne University in Detroit, receiving a bachelor's degree in English in 1942, as the school did not yet offer a degree in journalism.

== Early career ==
Thomas moved to Washington, D.C. Her first job in journalism was as a copygirl for the now-defunct Washington Daily News. After eight months at the paper, she joined with her colleagues in a strike action and was fired.

Thomas joined United Press in 1943 and reported on women's topics for its radio wire service. Her first assignments focused her on societal issues, women's news and celebrity profiles. Later in the decade, and in the early fifties, she wrote UP's Names in the News column, for which she interviewed numerous Washington celebrities. In 1955, she was assigned to cover the United States Department of Justice. She later was assigned to cover other agencies, including the United States Department of Health, as well as Capitol Hill.

Thomas served as president of the Women's National Press Club from 1959 through 1960. In 1959, she and a few of her fellow female journalists forced the National Press Club, then barred to women, to allow them to attend an address by Soviet leader Nikita Khrushchev.

== Presidential correspondent ==
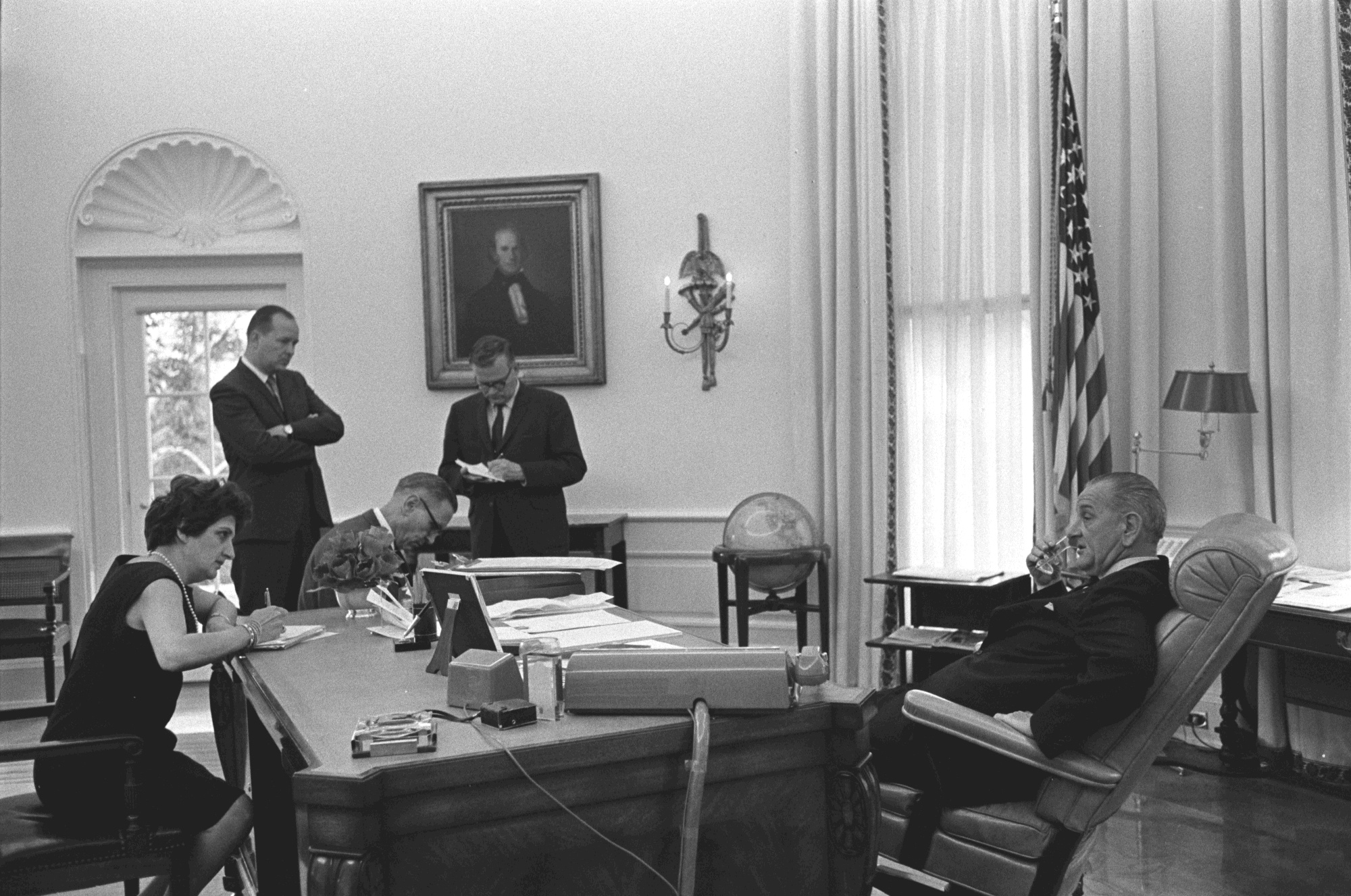
Thomas with President Lyndon B. Johnson in the Oval Office, June 21, 1966

In November 1960, Thomas began covering then President-elect John F. Kennedy, taking the initiative to switch from reporting the "women's angle" to reporting the news of the day. She became a White House correspondent for UPI in January 1961. Thomas became known as the "Sitting Buddha," and the "First Lady of the Press." It was during Kennedy's administration that she began ending presidential press conferences with a signature "Thank you, Mr. President," reviving a tradition started by UPI's Albert Merriman Smith during the presidency of Franklin Roosevelt.

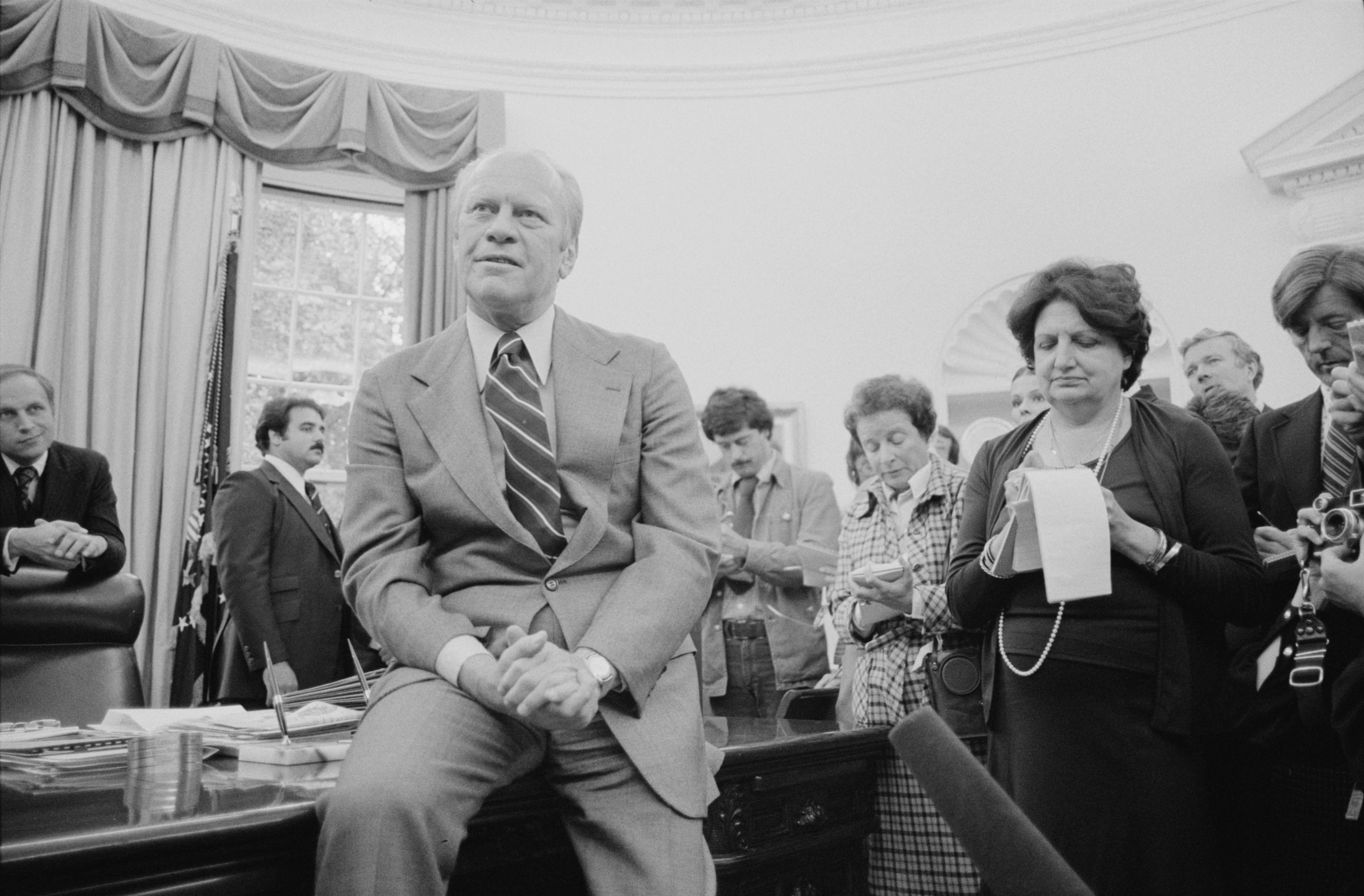
Thomas with President Ford and chief of staff Dick Cheney (left) in 1976

In a 2008 article, The Christian Science Monitor wrote: "Thomas, a fixture in American politics, is outspoken, blunt, demanding, forceful and unrelenting. Not only does she command respect by the highest powers in the US, her reputation is known worldwide." When Cuban leader Fidel Castro was asked in the early 2000s what was the difference between democracy in Cuba and democracy in the United States, Castro reportedly replied, "I don't have to answer questions from Helen Thomas." Thomas considered Castro's reply to be "the height of flattery."

In 1962, Thomas convinced President Kennedy not to attend the annual dinners held for the White House correspondents and photographers if they disallowed women from attending. President Kennedy moved for the dinners to be combined into one event, with women allowed to attend. In 1970, UPI named Thomas their chief White House correspondent, making her the first woman to serve in the position. She was named the chief of UPI's White House bureau in 1974.

Thomas was the only female print journalist to accompany President Richard Nixon during his 1972 visit to China. During the Watergate scandal, Martha Mitchell, wife of United States Attorney General John N. Mitchell, frequently called Thomas to discuss how the Nixon administration was using Mitchell as a scapegoat.

Thomas circled the globe several times, traveling with every U.S. president from Richard Nixon through Barack Obama. She covered every Economic Summit since 1975, working up to the position of UPI's White House Bureau Chief, a post she would hold for over 25 years. While serving as White House Bureau Chief, she authored a regular column for UPI, "Backstairs at the White House." The column provided an insider's view of various presidential administrations.

In 1975, the Washington Press Corps club, known as the Gridiron Club, admitted Thomas, making her the first woman to become a member. From 1975 through 1976, she served as the first female president of the White House Correspondents' Association.

Thomas was the only member of the White House Press Corps to have her own seat in the White House Briefing Room. All other seats are assigned to media outlets.

In 1979, the Supersisters trading card set was produced and distributed; one of the cards featured Thomas's name and picture.

=== Departure from UPI ===
On May 17, 2000, the day after it was announced that the UPI had been acquired by News World Communications Inc., an international media conglomerate founded and controlled by Unification Church leader Reverend Sun Myung Moon which owns The Washington Times and other news media, Thomas resigned from the UPI after 57 years with the organization. She later described the change in ownership as "a bridge too far." Less than two months later, she joined Hearst Newspapers as an opinion columnist, writing on national affairs and the White House.

After leaving her job as a reporter at the UPI, Thomas became more likely to air her personal, negative views. In a speech at the Massachusetts Institute of Technology, she quipped, "I censored myself for 50 years when I was a reporter. Now I wake up and ask myself, 'Who do I hate today?'"

=== George W. Bush administration ===
During President George W. Bush's first term, Thomas reacted to Press Secretary Ari Fleischer's statements about arms shipments to the terrorists by asking: "Where do the Israelis get their arms?"

He responded: "There's a difference, Helen, and that is—"

"What is the difference?" she asked.

He responded: "The targeting of innocents through the use of terror, which is a common enemy for Yasser Arafat and for the people of Israel, as well as—"

She interrupted him, saying: "Palestinian people are fighting for their land."

He responded: "I think that the killing of innocents is a category entirely different. Justifying killing of innocents for land is an argument in support of terrorism."

In January 2003, following a speech at a Society of Professional Journalists banquet, Thomas told an autograph seeker, "I'm covering the worst president in American history." The autograph-seeker was a sports writer for The Daily Breeze and her comments were published. After that she was not called upon during a press conference for the first time in over four decades. She wrote to the President to apologize.

For many years, Thomas sat in the front row and asked the first question during White House press conferences. However, according to Thomas in a 2006 Daily Show interview, this ended because she no longer represented a wire service. During the Bush administration, Thomas was moved to the back row during press conferences; she was called upon at briefings on a daily basis but no longer ended presidential news conferences by saying, "Thank you, Mr. President." When asked why she was seated in the back row, she said, "They didn't like me. . . . I ask too many mean questions."

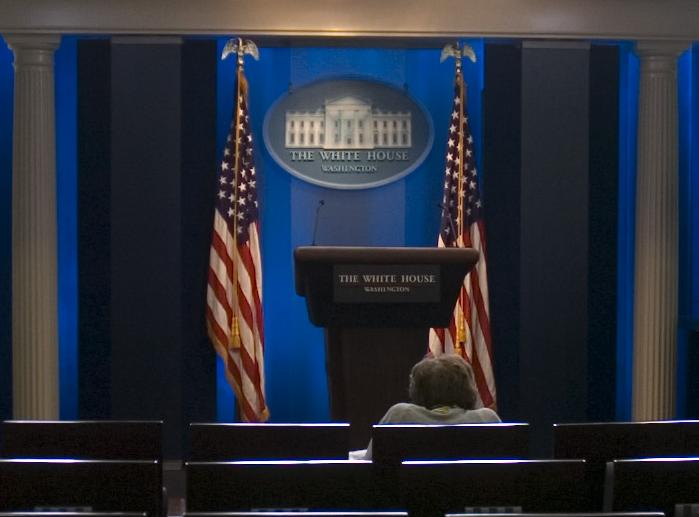
Thomas in the James S. Brady Press Briefing Room half an hour before morning gaggle, 2007

On March 21, 2006, Thomas was called upon directly by President Bush for the first time in three years. Thomas asked Bush about the War in Iraq:

I'd like to ask you, Mr. President, [about] your decision to invade Iraq . . . Every reason given, publicly at least, has turned out not to be true. My question is: Why did you really want to go to war? . . . You have said it wasn't oil . . . quest for oil, it hasn't been Israel, or anything else. What was it?

Bush responded by discussing the war on terror, stating as a reason for the invasion that Saddam Hussein chose to deny inspectors and not to disclose required information.

In July 2006, she told The Hill, "The day Dick Cheney is going to run for president, I'll kill myself. All we need is another liar . . . I think he'd like to run, but it would be a sad day for the country if he does."

At the July 18, 2006, White House press briefing, Thomas remarked: "The United States . . . could have stopped the bombardment of Lebanon. We have that much control with the Israelis . . . we have gone for collective punishment against all of Lebanon and Palestine." Press Secretary Tony Snow responded: "Thank you for the Hezbollah view."

In a press conference on November 30, 2007, Thomas questioned White House Press Secretary Dana Perino as to why Americans should depend on General David Petraeus in determining when to re-deploy U.S. troops from Iraq. Perino began to answer, when Thomas interjected with "You mean how many more people we kill?" Perino immediately took offense, responding:

Helen, I find it really unfortunate that you use your front row position, bestowed upon you by your colleagues, to make such statements. This is a...it is an honor and a privilege to be in the briefing room, and to suggest that we, the United States, are killing innocent people is just absurd and very offensive.

Refusing to back down, Thomas responded immediately by asking Perino if she knew how many innocent Iraqis had been killed and then questioned the worth of regret when Perino responded that the administration regretted the loss of all innocent Iraqi lives.

=== Obama administration ===
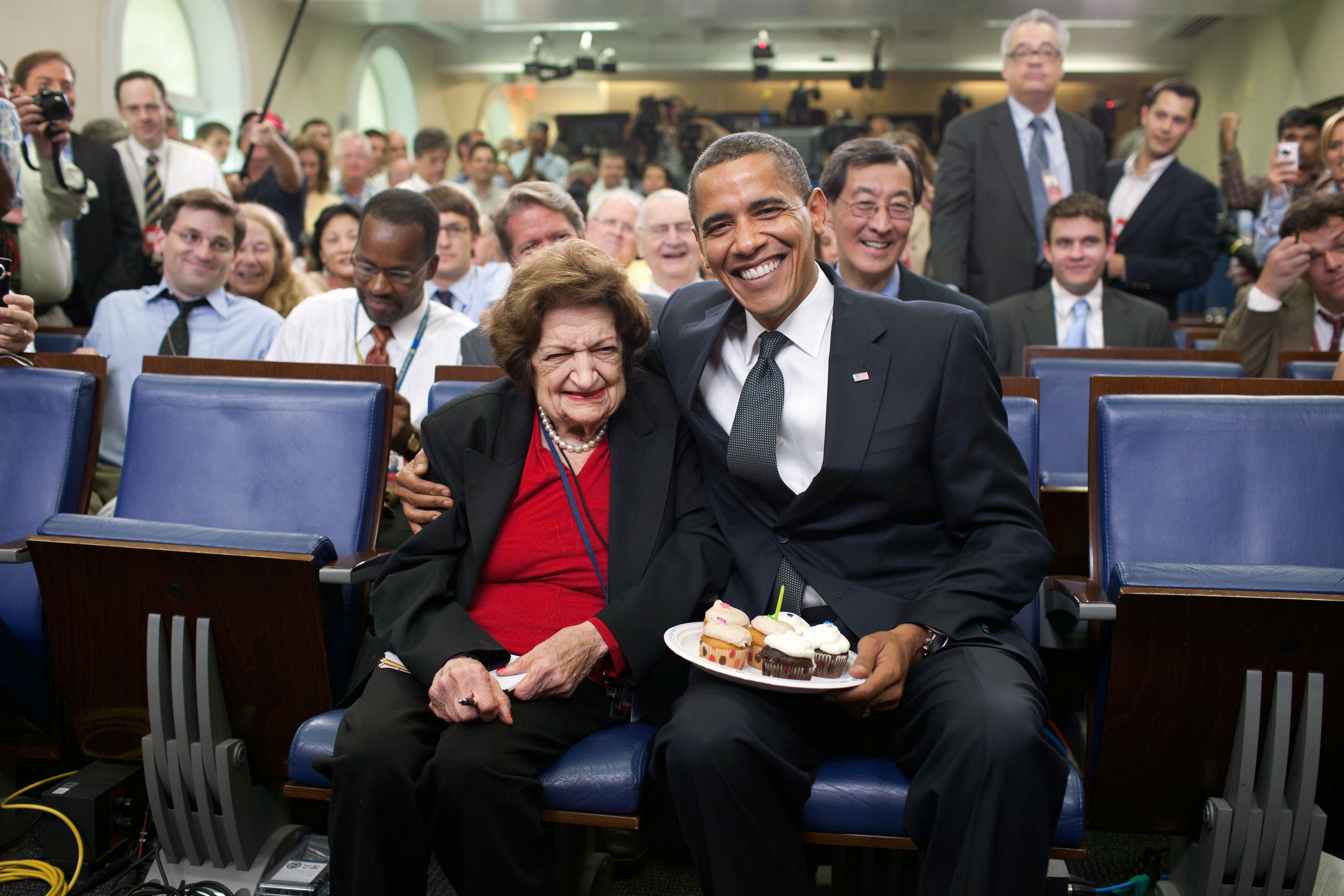
President Barack Obama presenting Thomas cupcakes on her 89th birthday

On February 9, 2009, Thomas was present in the front row for newly elected President Obama's first news conference. President Obama called on her with the statement, "Helen. I'm excited, this is my inaugural moment," seemingly a reference to her long-term presence in the White House Press Corps. Thomas asked if he knew of any Middle Eastern country that possessed nuclear weapons, implicitly asking him to confirm or deny Israel's alleged nuclear arsenal, despite Israel's long held stance of "nuclear ambiguity". Obama replied that he did not want to "speculate" on the matter.

On July 1, 2009, Thomas commented on the Obama administration's handling of the press, "we have had some control but not this control. I mean I'm amazed, I'm amazed at you people who call for openness and transparency and you have controlled...".

On August 4, 2009, Thomas celebrated her 89th birthday. President Obama, whose birthday is on the same day, presented Thomas with birthday cupcakes and sang Happy Birthday to her before that day's press conference.

=== Comments on Israel ===
Rabbi David Nesenoff of RabbiLive.com, on the White House grounds with his son and a teenage friend for a May 27, 2010, American Jewish Heritage Celebration Day, interviewed Thomas for an unscheduled short conversation as she was leaving the White House via the North Lawn driveway. When solicited for "any comments on Israel," she replied, "tell them to get the hell out of Palestine" and: "Remember, these people are occupied and it's their land. Not German [sic], it's not Poland." Then he asked: "Where they should go? What do they do?". To which she responded: "They go home." He follows-up with: "Where's the home?". She replies back with "Poland, .." but in the middle of her answer, he adds to his question: "So the Jews..", she adds: "...Germany." He finishes off: "...should go back to Poland and Germany?" To which she finally responds: "And America and everywhere else. Why push people out of there who have lived there for centuries? See?" An about two-minutes long full cut of the May 27, 2010, interview was posted on Nesenoff's YouTube channel on June 7.

In a later interview on CNN, on The Joy Behar Show, Thomas defended her comments. In response to Behar's question of whether she was an antisemite, Thomas replied: "Hell no! I'm a Semite, of Arab background." She then said of Israelis: "They're not Semites."

In addition, Thomas said in the CNN interview: "Why do they [Jews] have to go anywhere? They aren't being persecuted! They don't have the right to take other people's land." When asked if she regretted the comment, she said: "We have organized lobbyists in favor of Israel, you can't open your mouth. I can call the president of the United States anything in the book, but you say one thing about Israel and you're off limits."

Following the controversy, The Executive Committee of the Society of Professional Journalists (SPJ) voted to recommend that the organization retire the Helen Thomas Award for Lifetime Achievement, which had been awarded since 2000. After her initial comments, the committee decided not to act, as it was "a one-time, spontaneous remark for which she apologized", but acted after she reiterated it.

On June 4, Thomas posted the following response on her website: "I deeply regret my comments I made last week regarding the Israelis and the Palestinians. They do not reflect my heart-felt belief that peace will come to the Middle East only when all parties recognize the need for mutual respect and tolerance. May that day come soon."

==== Resignation ====
Thomas's agency, Nine Speakers, Inc., immediately dropped her as a client because of her remarks. In a statement, they said "Ms. Thomas has had an esteemed career as a journalist, and she has been a trailblazer for women, helping others in her profession, and beyond. However, in light of recent events, Nine Speakers is no longer able to represent Ms. Thomas, nor can we condone her comments on the Middle East." Craig Crawford, who co-authored Listen up, Mr. President, said "I ... will no longer be working with Helen on our book projects." Her scheduled delivery of a commencement speech at Walt Whitman High School in Bethesda, Maryland, was canceled by the school. The White House Correspondents' Association, over which she once presided, issued a statement calling her remarks "indefensible". In January 2011, the Society of Professional Journalists voted to retire the Helen Thomas Award for Lifetime Achievement.

On June 7, Thomas abruptly tendered her resignation from Hearst Newspapers. The next day, in an interview on NBC's Today Show, President Obama called her remarks "offensive" and "out of line" and said her retirement was "the right decision." He remarked that it was a "shame" her celebrated career had to end in such controversy, and at the same time he recognized her long service covering U.S. presidents, calling her "a real institution in Washington". Her comments also garnered rebukes from numerous others, including White House Press Secretary Robert Gibbs, former White House Press Secretary Ari Fleischer, former special counsel to and White House spokesman for President Bill Clinton, Lanny Davis, former Arkansas Gov. Mike Huckabee and Hoover Institution senior fellow Victor Davis Hanson.

Thomas was defended by former presidential candidate Ralph Nader, Fox News contributor Ellen Ratner, former UPI managing editor Michael Freedman and The Nation editor and publisher Katrina vanden Heuvel. Nader said there was a "double standard" where one "off-hand 'ill-conceived remark'" (quoting NPR ombudsman Alicia Shepard) ended Helen Thomas' career while "ultra-right wing radio and cable ranters" engaged in "bigotry, stereotypes and falsehoods directed wholesale against Muslims, including a blatant antisemitism against Arabs" keep getting rewarded with "enhanced careers and fat lecture fees." Medea Benjamin said "We are clear what Helen Thomas meant to say, which is that Israel should cease its occupation of Palestine and we agree with that".

In an October 2010 radio interview with Scott Spears of WMRN, Thomas said she realized soon after making the comments that she would be fired, stating, "I hit the third rail. You cannot criticize Israel in this country and survive." She added that she issued an apology because people were upset, but that ultimately, she still "had the same feelings about Israel's aggression and brutality."

== Last years ==
=== 2010 speech and comments about Jews and Zionists ===
On December 2, 2010, shortly before a speech for the eighth annual "Images and Perceptions of Arab Americans" conference in Dearborn, Michigan, Thomas told reporters that she still stood by the comments she had made to Nesenoff. Referring to her resignation, she said "I paid a price, but it's worth it to speak the truth." During the speech, Thomas said: "Congress, the White House, Hollywood and Wall Street are owned by Zionists. No question, in my opinion." Thomas defended her comments on December 7, telling Scott Spears of Marion, Ohio radio station WMRN, "I just think that people should be enlightened as to who is in charge of the opinion in this country."

The next day, the Anti-Defamation League called for journalism schools and organizations to rescind any honors given to Thomas. The organization said that Thomas had "clearly, unequivocally revealed herself as a vulgar antisemite" in the speech. Wayne State University in Detroit discontinued the Helen Thomas Spirit of Diversity in Media Award, which it had been granting for more than ten years, citing what it called her antisemitic remarks. Thomas objected, saying that "the leaders of Wayne State University have made a mockery of the First Amendment and disgraced their understanding of its inherent freedom of speech and the press." Asked by the Detroit Free Press how she would respond to people who say she is antisemitic, Thomas responded: 'I'd say I'm a Semite. What are you talking about?'"

Thomas was interviewed for the April 2011 issue of Playboy magazine. When asked "Do you actually think there’s a secret Jewish conspiracy at work in this country [the US]?", Thomas replied, "Not a secret. It’s very open."

=== Subsequent employment ===
Thomas was employed as a columnist by the Virginia Falls Church News-Press from January 2011 to January 2012, contributing a few sporadic columns in the free weekly paper. Owner-Editor Nicholas Benton repeatedly defended the decision to hire her despite her comments. He said in 2011 that he was "outraged" when the Society of Professional Journalists voted on retiring a scholarship award named for Thomas. Benton defended Thomas from antisemitism by saying that Thomas "is herself a Semite" and was "expressing a political point of view [in the interview with Nesenoff above], and not a bigoted racial sentiment."

== Personal life ==
Thomas described herself as a liberal. For most of her adult life, she chose her work over her personal life. At age 51, Thomas married a colleague, Douglas Cornell, who was just retiring as the White House reporter for the Associated Press. Four years later, he was diagnosed with Alzheimer's disease, and she cared for him until his death in 1982.

=== Death ===
Thomas died on July 20, 2013, at her home in Washington, D.C. at the age of 92. Thomas was cremated and her ashes are buried in Detroit, following a traditional Antiochian Orthodox funeral service.

== Legacy ==
Many female journalists memorialized Thomas on Twitter, including Judy Woodruff, who called her a "trailblazer", and Lynn Sweet, who said she was a "glass ceiling breaking journalist". Andrea Mitchell tweeted that Thomas "made it possible for all of us who followed."

Dana Perino, who served as press secretary to President George W. Bush, remembered that on her first day as press secretary, Thomas approached her to give her words of encouragement. President Obama released a statement calling her "a true pioneer" who "never failed to keep presidents—myself included—on their toes."

In 2006, Thomas encouraged Arab-Americans to become journalists: "For her own part, Helen Thomas says that, while she’s glad to see Americans of Arab descent winning journalism prizes, she would prefer simply to see more bylines with Arab names. So she has one instruction for newcomers: 'Get into the game!' she says."

== Awards ==
Thomas received numerous awards and more than 30 honorary degrees. In 1976, Thomas was named one of the World Almanac's 25 Most Influential Women in America. In 1985, she received the Columbia University Journalism Award. and in 1984 was honored with the National Press Club Fourth Estate Award. In 2000, Thomas was presented with the Kiplinger Distinguished Contributions to Journalism Award. In 2003, Thomas received the Religious Liberty Award from the American Humanist Association.

In 1986 she received the William Allen White Foundation Award for Journalistic Merit from the University of Kansas. In 1993, Thomas won the Walter Cronkite Award for Excellence in Journalism. Thomas received an Al Neuharth Award for Excellence in the Media from the Freedom Forum in 1991. The White House Correspondents' Association honored her in 1998 by establishing the "Helen Thomas Lifetime Achievement Award". In 2000, her alma mater, Wayne State University, established an award for journalists in her honor, the "Helen Thomas Spirit of Diversity award". In December 2010, the award was discontinued by Wayne State which cited her renewed remarks similar to those in May 2010. Speaking for Wayne State, Matthew Seeger, its interim dean said, that the award is given to promote the importance of diversity in the media and that this award "is no longer helping us achieve our goals." In 2007, Thomas received a Foremother Award from the National Center for Health Research.

In October 2010, the Council on American-Islamic Relations (CAIR) honored Thomas with a lifetime achievement award.

In April 2012, Thomas received an award from the Palestine Liberation Organization's General Mission to the United States. The award was presented by PLO Executive Committee member Hanan Ashrawi to "recognize Thomas's long career in the field of journalism, during which she defended the Palestinian position every step of the way."

The Society of Professional Journalists had an annual award for top journalists named after Thomas but decided to retire the award in 2011. The SPJ executive board initially said it would keep the award after Thomas's May 2010 comments calling for Jews to leave Israel to the Palestinians and return to "Europe, Russia and America," but the board decided to retire the award after Thomas's remarks later in 2010 about the alleged control of the United States by Zionists. Several pro-Thomas individuals in SPJ leadership roles campaigned to have the award reinstated, but the retirement decision was upheld by SPJ's regional leadership that year and by an 85-77 margin at the national SPJ convention, also that year, marking the permanent end of any ties between Thomas and SPJ.

== Bibliography ==
- Dateline: White House (Macmillan, 1975), ISBN 0-02-617620-3
- Front Row at the White House: My Life and Times (Scribner, 2000), ISBN 0-684-86809-1
- Thanks for the Memories, Mr. President: Wit and Wisdom from the Front Row at the White House (Charles Scribner's Sons, 2003), ISBN 0-7432-0226-0
- Watchdogs of Democracy?: The Waning Washington Press Corps and How It Has Failed the Public (Charles Scribner's Sons, 2006), ISBN 0-7432-6781-8
- The Great White House Breakout (with co-author and illustrator Chip Bok; Penguin Group, 2008), ISBN 978-0-8037-3300-8 (children's book)
- Listen Up Mr. President: Everything You Always Wanted Your President to Know and Do (with co-author Craig Crawford;Charles Scribner's Sons, 2009) ISBN 1-4391-4815-5

== See also ==
- Women in journalism and media professions
