= Not a Love Story: A Film About Pornography =

- Directed by: Bonnie Sherr Klein
- Written by: Andrée Klein; Bonnie Sherr Klein; Irene Lilienheim Angelico; Rose-Aimée Todd
- Produced by: Dorothy Todd Hénaut; Mark L. Rosen
- Starring: Lindalee Tracey; Bonnie Sherr Klein
- Cinematography: Pierre Letarte
- Edited by: Anne Henderson
- Music by: Ginette Bellavance; Sylvia Moscovitz
- Production company: National Film Board of Canada Studio D
- Distributed by: National Film Board of Canada; Esma Films
- Release date: 11 September 1981 (TIFF)
- Running time: 69 minutes
- Country: Canada
- Language: English
- Budget: $503,519

Not a Love Story: A Film About Pornography is a Canadian documentary film about the pornography industry, directed by Bonnie Sherr Klein and released in 1981.

It remains one of the landmark works from Studio D, the women's unit of the National Film Board of Canada. The film was banned in the province of Ontario on the basis of its pornographic content, a decision that was later reversed.

The film premiered at the 1981 Festival of Festivals in Toronto.

== Synopsis ==
Film-maker Bonnie Sherr Klein and stripper (later journalist) Lindalee Tracy explore multiple facets of the sex entertainment industry. They interview porn actors, sex workers and notable feminists such as Robin Morgan and Kate Millett.

== Participants ==
- Margaret Atwood
- Kathleen Barry
- Edward Donnerstein
- Susan Griffin
- Bonnie Sherr Klein
- Kate Millett
- Robin Morgan
- Kenneth Pitchford
- Suze Randall
- Marc Stevens
- Lindalee Tracey

== Production ==
The film had a budget of $503,519 (equivalent to $1,670,259 in 2025).

== Release ==
The film was banned in Saskatchewan. The Ontario Censor Board refused to classify it, resulting it not being allowed to be shown, but the film was seen by 40,000 people at 300 private showings in Ontario within the next year. The film became the NFB's highest-grossing film at that point in its existence after being shown in Montreal for nine months. The film was retitled to A Film Against Pornography in the United Kingdom.

== Critical response ==
At the time, the local Canadian reviewers were hostile. The Globe and Mail called the film "bourgeois feminist fascism" and the Toronto Star judged it to be "a one-sided tract of outrage that only feminists and moral majority believers will take to their bosom". Writing in the Village Voice, B. Ruby Rich dismissed the film as anti-porn propaganda. Jay Scott criticized the film as an "unenlightening learn-a-long."

The film is the subject of a book-length analysis for the Canadian Cinema Series published by University of Toronto Press. In its reassessment, it acknowledges that the film "was one of the first attempts to actually give voice to the women and men who worked in the sex industry without expecting them to recant or testify to their own exploitation."

== Works cited ==
- Evans, Gary (1991). In the National Interest: A Chronicle of the National Film Board of Canada from 1949 to 1989. University of Toronto Press. ISBN 0802027849.
- Rodley, Chris, ed. (1997). Cronenberg on Cronenberg. Faber and Faber. ISBN 0571191371.
