= 1981 Toronto International Film Festival =

Annual Canadian film festival

- Festival poster
- Opening film: Ticket to Heaven
- Closing film: Threshold
- Location: Toronto, Ontario, Canada
- Hosted by: Toronto International Film Festival Group
- Festival date: September 10, 1981–September 19, 1981
- Language: English
- Website: tiff.net
- 1982 1980

The 6th Toronto International Film Festival (TIFF) took place in Toronto, Ontario, Canada between September 10 and September 19, 1981. The festival screened films from more than twenty countries. Ticket to Heaven, a Canadian film, was selected as the opening film. Another Canadian film, Threshold, was chosen as the closing film. The People's Choice Award was awarded to Chariots of Fire, directed by Hugh Hudson; the film later won an Oscar for Best Picture.

The Canadian documentary Not a Love Story, about the pornography industry, was also featured at the festival. Initially it was banned by the Ontario Censor Board, but later they allowed a single screening of film during the festival. With all the media attention surrounding this decision, public interest in the film increased. However, the Censor Board refused to permit a second screening of the film.

== Awards ==
Award	Film	Director
People's Choice Award	Chariots of Fire	Hugh Hudson

== Programme ==
=== Gala ===
- Chariots of Fire by Hugh Hudson
- Cutter's Way by Ivan Passer
- Cutting It Short by Jiří Menzel
- Heartaches by Donald Shebib
- Man of Iron by Andrzej Wajda
- Montenegro by Dusan Makavejev
- Neige by Jean-Henri Roger and Juliet Berto
- Only When I Laugh by Glenn Jordan
- Threshold by Richard Pearce
- Ticket to Heaven by Ralph L. Thomas

=== Buried Treasures ===
- An Actor's Revenge by Kon Ichikawa
- An Affair to Remember by Leo McCarey
- Bird of Paradise
- Glen or Glenda by Ed Wood
- The Indian Tomb by Fritz Lang
- Lumière d'été by Jean Grémillon
- Mikey and Nicky by Elaine May
- Some Call It Loving by James B. Harris
- The Tiger of Eschnapur by Fritz Lang
- Track of the Cat by William A. Wellman

=== Critic's Choice ===
- L'Altra donna by Peter Del Monte
- Angels of Iron by Thomas Brasch
- Asphalt Night by Peter Fratzscher
- Beads of One Rosary by Kazimierz Kutz
- Céleste by Percy Adlon
- Charlotte by Frans Weisz
- Desperado City by Vadim Glowna
- Diva by Jean-Jacques Beineix
- In Search of Famine by Mrinal Sen
- Jaguar by Lino Brocka
- Killer of Sheep by Charles Burnett
- Looping by Rolf Bührmann and Walter Bockmayer
- Malou by Jeanine Meerapfel
- The Mark of the Beast by Pieter Verhoeff
- Pixote by Héctor Babenco
- The Pretenders by Jos Stelling
- Short Circuit by Patrick Grandperret
- Squeeze by Richard Turner

=== Culture Under Pressure ===
A curated program of films about minority groups under cultural pressure from the majority.

- Aziza by Abdellatif Ben Ammar
- Babylon by Franco Rosso
- Chuquiago by Antonio Eguino
- Far from Home by Sohrab Shahid-Saless
- Gaijin: Roads to Freedom by Tizuka Yamasaki
- Hazal by Ali Özgentürk
- Magic in the Sky by Peter Raymont
- Palermo or Wolfsburg by Werner Schroeter
- Take Your Ten Thousand Francs and Get Out by Mahmoud Zemmouri
- Where Dollars Grow on Trees by Tahani Rached

=== Laughing Matters ===
A program of classic comedy or comedy-drama films from throughout cinematic history.

- 10 by Blake Edwards
- À Nous la Liberté by René Clair
- The Americanization of Emily by Arthur Hiller
- Annie Hall by Woody Allen
- The Apartment by Billy Wilder
- The Awful Truth by Leo McCarey
- Baby Doll by Elia Kazan
- The Baker's Wife by Marcel Pagnol
- The Bed Sitting Room by Richard Lester
- Boudu Saved from Drowning by Jean Renoir
- Bringing Up Baby by Howard Hawks
- The Chess Players by Satyajit Ray
- Dr. Strangelove by Stanley Kubrick
- Duck Soup by Leo McCarey
- Fanfare by Bert Haanstra
- The Fireman's Ball by Miloš Forman
- Five Day Lover by Philippe de Broca
- The General by Clyde Bruckman and Buster Keaton
- The Gold Rush by Charlie Chaplin
- Hail the Conquering Hero by Preston Sturges
- Happiness by King Vidor
- The Heartbreak Kid by Elaine May
- Hellzapoppin' by H. C. Potter
- Jonah Who Will Be 25 in the Year 2000 by Alain Tanner
- Laurel and Hardy Shorts by various directors
- Lolita by Stanley Kubrick
- Lord Love a Duck by George Axelrod
- M. Hulot's Holiday by Jacques Tati
- Macunaíma by Joaquim Pedro de Andrade
- Mickey One by Arthur Penn
- Il minestrone by Sergio Citti
- Modern Times by Charlie Chaplin
- Nashville by Robert Altman
- Nights of Cabiria by Federico Fellini
- The Nutty Professor by Jerry Lewis
- A Pacemaker and a Sidecar by André Forcier
- The Paleface by Norman Z. McLeod
- Pat and Mike by George Cukor
- Polyester by John Waters
- A Report on the Party and the Guests by Jan Němec
- Seduced and Abandoned by Pietro Germi
- Shampoo by Hal Ashby
- Shoot the Piano Player by François Truffaut
- The Sheep Has Five Legs by Henri Verneuil
- Simon of the Desert by Luis Buñuel
- Taking Off by Miloš Forman
- Twentieth Century by Howard Hawks
- W.R.: Mysteries of the Organism by Dušan Makavejev
- Whiskey Galore! by Alexander Mackendrick
- Zazie dans le Métro by Louis Malle

=== Less Is More ===
Films from independent studios.

- The Dark End of the Street by Jan Egleson
- Day by Day by Paul Tana
- A Flight of Rainbirds by Ate de Jong
- The Grass Is Singing by Michael Raeburn
- Jet Lag by Gonzalo Herralde
- Looks and Smiles by Ken Loach
- She Dances Alone by Robert Dornhelm
- Street Music by Jenny Bowen
- The Vulture by Yaky Yosha

=== Real to Reel ===
Documentary films.

- Being Different by Harry Rasky
- Blood Wedding by Carlos Saura
- The Followers (Les Adeptes) by Gilles Blais
- A Free Life
- From Mao to Mozart: Isaac Stern in China by Murray Lerner
- Image Before My Eyes by Joshua Waletzky
- Mur Murs by Agnès Varda
- P4W: Prison for Women by Holly Dale and Janis Cole
- Soldier Girls by Nick Broomfield and Joan Churchill

=== Special Presentations ===
- The Contract by Krzysztof Zanussi
- The Crime of Cuenca by Pilar Miró
- Fårö Document by Ingmar Bergman
- Fool's Gold
- Gamin
- The Gardener
- The Heiresses by Márta Mészáros
- Imagine the Sound by Ron Mann
- In Defense of People by Rafigh Pooya
- Krieghoff by Kevin Sullivan
- Malevil by Christian de Chalonge
- Not a Love Story by Bonnie Sherr Klein
- A Time to Rise by Anand Patwardhan

=== 3-D ===
A late-night program of genre and cult films exhibited in 3D film format.

- Bwana Devil by Arch Oboler
- Dial M for Murder by Alfred Hitchcock
- Flesh for Frankenstein by Paul Morrissey
- Fort Ti by William Castle
- House of Wax by Andre de Toth
- Inferno by Dario Argento
- Miss Sadie Thompson by Curtis Bernhardt
- Phantom of the Rue Morgue by Roy Del Ruth

=== Yılmaz Güney ===
Retrospective of the films of Turkish director Yılmaz Güney.

- Elegy
- The Enemy
- The Father
- The Herd
- Hope

=== World of Animation ===
Several programs of animated short films, presented under the titles Best British Animation, NFB Animation, Independent Animation, Ottawa Festival I & II, Animation & Commercials, Cinémathèque québécoise I & II and Best of Animation. However, sources are not currently available to confirm the titles of individual short films aired within the programs.
