= The Whole World Is Watching =

"The whole world is watching" is a phrase chanted by anti-Vietnam War demonstrators in Chicago during the 1968 Democratic National Convention.

The whole world is watching and variants may also refer to:

- "The Whole World Is Watching" (The Falcon and the Winter Soldier), the fourth episode of the 2021 television series
- "Whole World Is Watching", a 2014 song by Within Temptation

== See also ==
- The World Is Watching, a 1988 Canadian short documentary film
