= Out from Under: Disability, History and Things to Remember =

Out from Under: Disability, History and Things to Remember is a traveling exhibition that explores the history of disability within the lives of Canadians.

The exhibition was produced in collaboration with students, scholars and alumni from the School of Disability Studies at Ryerson University (now Toronto Metropolitan University). The exhibition originated from a special topic seminar designed to uncover the hidden history of disability in Canada. Each student identified an artifact to explore that represented a particular moment in Canadian disability history. Thirteen objects were then selected for the exhibition, revealing narratives that pay homage to the resilience, creativity, and the civic and cultural contributions of Canadians with disabilities. Accompanying interpretive texts help confront stereotypical representations of disability such as pity, inspiration or freak, helping to illustrate the complexity of disability struggles for social and political acknowledgement, identity, survival and remembrance.

Out from Under is curated by three faculty members from Ryerson University's School of Disability Studies.

== Exhibition components ==
Each objects' history is represented by a single word title: Digging, Labouring, Dressing, Fixing, Measuring, Naming, Breathing, Remembering, Packing, Trailblazing, Struggling, Leading and Aspiring.

== Accessibility features ==
American Sign Language Video podcast of all exhibit text in American Sign Language.

Audio description and Touch Stations Audio podcasts of all exhibit text with detailed audio descriptions and touch stations profiling selected objects.

Braille Booklets Braille copies of exhibit text including participant profiles.

== Exhibition catalogue ==
A 60-page color catalogue entitled "Out from Under: Disability, History and Things to Remember" (2008) was produced by the School of Disability Studies.

== Exhibition history ==
March 9 to March 21, 2010, Cultural Olympiad exhibition (UBC Robson Square), Vancouver, Canada

April 17 to July 13, 2008, Royal Ontario Museum, Toronto, Canada

October 25 to October 31, 2007, Abilities Arts Festival (at the Columbus Centre), Toronto, Canada

== Awards ==
Access Award for Disability Issues, 2008.

== See also ==
- Disability studies
- Catherine Frazee
- 2010 Winter Paralympics
- Paralympic Games
- Disabled sports
