= FREE Players Drum and Bugle Corps =

Musical marching band, New York

FREE Players Drum and Bugle Corps is an American drum and bugle corps in Long Island, New York, made up of disabled people. With four sections – drumline, front ensemble, color guard, and brass – the corps has more than 70 members. The FREE Players regularly perform in parades, competitions, and festivals throughout the United States, and have performed at the Drum Corps International and at the Drum Corps Associates world championships, where they also competed in 2019.

== History ==
The corps was founded in 2010 by Brian Calhoun, and is run by Family Residences and Essential Enterprises, Inc. (FREE), a nonprofit organization supporting individuals with intellectual or developmental disabilities, mental illness, and traumatic brain injuries.

The corps was invited to perform at the Drum Corps International World Class Championship in 2018, along with the Community Living Hamilton Drum Corps from Ontario, Canada. Although the FREE Players Drum and Bugle Corps performed at the 2018 DCI World Champions, they did not compete.

In 2019, however, the FREE Players Drum and Bugle Corps was invited to both perform and compete at the Drum Corps Associates World Championships. According to Newsweek, it was "the first time a differently abled drum and bugle corps was selected to compete". The FREE Players headlined the DCA championship, performing "Fabulous" on August 31, 2019, one day after their first Color Guard member performed an on-stage solo to the song "Pure Imagination" from Willy Wonka & the Chocolate Factory.
