= Donnerstein =

Donnerstein may refer to:

- A summit in Virgen municipality, Austria
- Edward Donnerstein, American professor
- Erich Donnerstein, or Lord Dynamo, fictional character from DC, Comics, see List of Justice Society of America enemies
