= Lindalee Tracey =

Canadian writer, journalist and filmmaker (1957–2006)

Lindalee Tracey (May 14, 1957 – October 19, 2006) was a Canadian broadcast journalist, documentary filmmaker, writer, and exotic dancer. She is best known for the documentary film Not a Love Story, a controversial 1981 film about pornography. Her credits include work on many films on controversial topics.

== Career ==
Her appearance as a journalist in the film Not a Love Story marked a career change for Tracey. Bonnie Sherr Klein, one of the film's producers, described meeting Tracey when she was working as a stripper in Montreal. Sherr Klein described being impressed that Tracey's act was different from those of other women she met researching the film—playful and intelligent, allowing her to retain a greater measure of autonomy and self-respect. Tracey was hired to serve as one of the film's researchers and presenters.

Following her work on the film Tracey started working as a writer and researcher, and later a producer. Tracey and her husband, Peter Raymont, set up a production company that produced many of their later works. Most of the documentaries she worked on were serious, issue-oriented films.

She and Raymont created the television drama The Border, which was eventually broadcast in 2008.

== Death and legacy ==
Tracey died on October 19, 2006, after a four-year battle with breast cancer.

Tracey's friends and family created the Lindalee Tracey Award to celebrate her memory and her accomplishments. A Canadian filmmaker is given the annual award at the Hot Docs film festival in Toronto.

== Filmography ==
- Not a Love Story: A Film About Pornography (1981)
- A 20th Century Chocolate Cake (1983)
- Other Tongues (1984)
- Abby, I Hardly Knew Ya (1995)
- An English Sense of Justice
- Passing The Flame: The Legacy of Women's College Hospital (1997)
- The Undefended Border (2002)
- Bhopal: The Search for Justice (2004)
- Shake Hands With the Devil: The Journey of Romeo Dallaire (2004) - Producer
- The Border (2008 - 38 X 1 hr) - Co-Creator
- The Anatomy of Burlesque
