= Inclusion Canada =

Non-profit organization

- Formation: 1958
- Merger of: L'institut National Canadien Francais (1972)
- Type: non-profit
- Registration no.: 10684 2545 RR0001
- Legal status: charity
- Headquarters: WeWork
- Location: 1 University Avenue, Toronto, Ontario
- Region served: Canada
- Members: people with intellectual disabilities and their families
- Official languages: English / French
- President: Robin Action
- Vice-President: Moira Wilson
- Board of directors: Catherine Frazee
- Subsidiaries: 400+
- Affiliations: People First of Canada
- Website: inclusioncanada.ca
- Formerly called: Canadian Association for Retarded Children, Canadian Association for the Mentally Retarded, Canadian Association for Community Living

Inclusion Canada, formerly the Canadian Association for Community Living, is a non-profit organization founded in 1958 to assist in training and socialization of people with intellectual disabilities, then known as Mental Retardation.

== History ==
The organization was founded as the "Canadian Association for Retarded Children". In 1969, the name was changed, to "Canadian Association for the Mentally Retarded". The name "Canadian Association for Community Living" was adopted in 1985, and the current name in 2020.

In 1963, the organization established the "Canadian John F. Kennedy Memorial Fund for Retarded Children". The money raised went to the organization and was used to fund research.

A "Canadian Retarded Children's Week" was also established in 1964 for fundraising, to run from May 6 to 16. The theme was "Flowers of Hope". Cosmos seeds were mailed out as a part of fundraising efforts.

The organization was a proponent of Deinstitutionalisation.

There are branches and subbranches in all Canadian provinces. In 1972, "L'institut National Canadien Francis" merged with the organization to provide French-language services.

During the 1970s NBCAMR operated sheltered workshops in Lindsay, New Brunswick, and other small communities. They were later closed when the organizations goals shifted.

The organization was involved in the Infant K case in 1985, the Eve case, and others involving involuntary contraceptive sterilization.

The organization rebranded from the "Canadian Association for Community Living" to Inclusion Canada on September 14, 2020.

During the COVID-19 pandemic, the organization received a $416,883 grant from the Public Health Agency of Canada's Immunization Partnership Fund to increase uptake of COVID-19 vaccines among people with intellectual disabilities and their families.

== See also ==
- Community Living Ontario
- R. v. Swain
- Sheltered workshop
