= Abby, I Hardly Knew Ya =

1995 Canadian documentary film

- Directed by: Lindalee Tracey
- Written by: Lindalee Tracey
- Produced by: Peter Raymont; Lindalee Tracey
- Cinematography: Douglas Kiefer
- Edited by: Cathy Gulkin
- Production company: White Pine Pictures
- Distributed by: TVOntario
- Release date: 1995
- Running time: 57 minutes
- Country: Canada
- Language: English

Abby, I Hardly Knew Ya is a Canadian short documentary film, directed by Lindalee Tracey and released in 1995. The film is a portrait of her own search for information about the life of her biological father Albert "Abby" Tracey, whom she had never really known as he left her mother when she was only a baby, and made contact with her only one further time before dying, impoverished and living on skid row in Ottawa, in 1971. It features interviews with Abby's surviving friends and family, and concludes with Lindalee visiting his grave.

Tracey described the film as having little effect on her view of her father himself, but as having the positive side effect of enabling her to develop relationships with the paternal cousins she met through the film's production.

The film had various film festival screenings, but was distributed primarily as an episode of TVOntario's documentary television series The View from Here.

The film received a Genie Award nomination for Best Short Documentary at the 16th Genie Awards in 1996.
