= Shameless: The Art of Disability =

Shameless: The ART of Disability
- Directed by: Bonnie Sherr Klein
- Production company: National Film Board of Canada
- Release date: 2006
- Country: Canada
- Language: English

Shameless: The ART of Disability is a documentary film by Bonnie Sherr Klein about persons with disabilities. Produced in 2006 by the National Film Board of Canada, it is Klein's first film since a catastrophic stroke in 1987 left her a quadriplegic. The film explores disability culture and the transformational power art has for people with disabilities.

Klein is featured in the film, along with fellow artists with disabilities Catherine Frazee, a poet and writer; humourist David Roche; dancer and choreographer Geoff McMurchy; and writer and artist Persimmon Blackbridge. Vancouver musician Veda Hille contributed music for the film.

Klein gathers these artists for a pyjama party where they explore Hollywood stereotypes of people with disabilities. The artists decide to meet a year later at Vancouver's Kickstart Festival with the intent of creating their own images of disability.

The film is set mainly in British Columbia, in Vancouver, Roberts Creek and Hornby Island, with brief sequences in San Francisco and Nova Scotia's Annapolis Valley.

== See also ==
- Carts of Darkness
