= Persimmon Blackbridge =

Canadian writer and artist

- Born: 1951 (age 74–75); Philadelphia, Pennsylvania
- Known for: writer, performance artist, installation artist, sculptor
- Awards: Ferro-Grumley Award; 1997 Lesbian Fiction; VIVA Award; 1991

Persimmon Blackbridge (born 1951) is a Canadian writer and artist whose work focuses on feminist, lesbian, disability and mental health issues. She identifies herself as a lesbian, a person with a disability, and a feminist. Her work explores these intersections through her sculptures, writing, curation and performance. Her novels follow characters that are very similar to Blackbridge's own life experiences, allowing her to write honestly about her perspective. Blackbridge's struggle with her mental health has become a large part of her practice, and she uses her experience with mental health institutions to address her perspective on them. Blackbridge is involved in the film, SHAMELESS: The Art of Disability exploring the complexity of living with a disability. Her contributions to projects like this help destigmatize the attitudes towards people with disabilities. Blackbridge has won many awards for her work exploring her identity and the complexities that come with it.

== Life and career ==
Born in Philadelphia, Pennsylvania, Blackbridge moved to British Columbia with her family as a teenager, and has worked and resided in Canada ever since. Along with artists Susan Stewart and Lizard Jones, she has been a member of the Vancouver-based Kiss and Tell collective. Kiss & Tell: Lesbian Art & Activism, the 2025 book published by the Art Canada Institute, explores Persimmon's biography, career, and activism through her work in the collective.

A portrait of Blackbridge, by her Kiss and Tell colleague Susan Stewart, is held by The ArQuives: Canada's LGBTQ2+ Archives' National Portrait Collection, in honour of her role as a significant builder of LGBT culture and history in Canada. She is also featured in the 2006 National Film Board of Canada documentary film Shameless: The Art of Disability.

Blackbridge's work as an artist has been in a variety of domains, including performance art, installation art, video art and sculpture. In 1991 she was the recipient of the VIVA Award for her sculptural installations.

=== Major exhibitions ===
Doing Time was Blackbridge's 1989 exhibition at the Surrey Art Gallery, created in collaboration with ex-prison inmates Geri Ferguson, Michelle Kanashiro-Christensen, Lyn MacDonald and Bea Walkus. Incorporating twenty-five life-sized cast-paper figures of the four women, the installation also included texts written by the participants. This marked the first exhibition where Blackbridge worked with large-scale multi-media assemblage.

Still Sane was her 1984 exhibit in collaboration with Sheila Gilhooly at Women in Focus gallery. This exhibition focused on Gilhooly's experiences of being institutionalized for being a lesbian. To create this exhibition, Gilhooly and Blackbridge spent 36 months creating a sculptural and written record of Gilhooly's time incarcerated in the hospital.

Both Still Sane and Doing Time were cited in the awarding of the 1991 VIVA award to Blackbridge.

In 2016, her exhibition Constructed Identities was the first to open Tangled Art Gallery, a fully accessible gallery dedicated to art focused on disability issues. The Constructed Identities exhibition aims to disrupt the current aesthetic of disability in society. It addresses intersections of race, sexuality, ability and gender constructs. The content of the exhibition and gallery it was shown in, Tangled art Gallery in Toronto, highlighted the importance of the shift in perspective about people with disabilities. The collection of works is made up of mixed, found materials to create bodies that explore the variety of disability and what people look like when their bodies do not conform.

== Disability in the arts ==
(See more at Disability in the arts)

Blackbridge was diagnosed with a learning disability in her youth. Her art work explores the diversity of disabilities and other intersections of peoples identities. By attending Emily Carr University of Art and Design, what was then known as the Vancouver School of Art she was able to obtain a degree despite her learning disability.

The film includes many artists all living with disabilities. It highlights the importance of art as a way to express yourself in an empowering sense, and in this way has the transformative power to shift culture.

Alison Kafer defines the term "crip" in her book Feminist Queer Crip as a term that intends to be confrontational and jarring. The purpose of the term is to reappropriate the word to mean something that benefits the community and those that identify as part of it, not as the derogatory term, cripple, from which it originated. The term "crip" and "crip aesthetics" both describe the intersections of identities. Rather than just focusing on a person's disabilities, this distinction attempts to acknowledge a person's diverse intersections of their ability and identity. "Crip aesthetics" consider both the outsiders view of disabled bodies as other in both social and political realms as well as the intersectional aspects of that individual's identity. Blackbridge's sculptures in her Constructed Identities exhibition explores her own intersections as a lesbian woman with a learning disability. The sculptures from this work negate the idea of a normative body in a celebratory way.

The conversation around accessibility in the arts typically revolves around how the audience can view and access the art, while this mentality is important it should also be noted that accessibility as a creator in the art world must be achieved. Blackbridge's art work bridges this gap, the content of her Constructed Identities sculptures embraces the aesthetics of disability and various types of bodies while placing this exhibition in a fully accessible gallery.

== Mental health ==
Blackbridge had her first mental breakdown when she was nineteen years old, after a realization about her sexuality and thus her struggle with what society was telling her about how to be a woman. Blackbridge's work helped her to process the conditions of Canadian mental health institutions. She has collaborated with another artist, Sheila Gilhooly, a woman who was institutionalized for her sexuality, to create Still Sane. This collaborative experience between the two women allowed Blackbridge to open up about both her sexuality and her disability.

== Writing ==
Although predominantly a non-fiction writer, Blackbridge has also published two novels. Her novel Sunnybrook won a Ferro-Grumley Award for Lesbian Fiction in 1997, and her novel Prozac Highway was a shortlisted nominee for the Lambda Literary Award in 1998. She was also a frequent contributor to Rites, one of the major Canadian LGBT publications of the late 1980s.

=== Novels ===
- Sunnybrook: A True Story with Lies (1996) A story about a woman named Diane who is struggling with her mental health, hiding her learning disability from her coworkers and girlfriend all while living a double life in a lesbian bar she frequents as her alter identity, Persimmon. A woman named Shirley from the bar convinces her that freeing herself from the lives she is living to live one true and honest one.
- Prozac Highway (1997) This novel has a lot in common with Blackbridge herself. The narrator and main character is named Jam, she is an artist, lesbian and person struggling with her mental health. The novel is not made up of many major plot points, but is propelled by the discussions Jam has via the internet.

=== Non-fiction ===
- Drawing the Line: Lesbian Sexual Politics on the Wall (1991, with Susan Stewart and Lizard Jones)
- Still Sane (1985, with Sheila Gilhooly)
- Her Tongue on My Theory: Images, Essays and Fantasies (1994, with Susan Stewart and Lizard Jones)
- Slow Dance: A Story of Stroke, Love and Disability (1997, with Bonnie Sherr Klein)

== Awards ==
- Winner of the VIVA award for visual arts in 1991
- 1995 Lambda Award in Washington DC
- 1997 Ferro Grumley Fiction Prize in New York City
- 1998 Van City Book Award
- Emily Carr Distinguished Alumni Award in 2000
