= List of films banned in Canada =

This is a non-exhaustive list of films that have been or are banned in Canada.

== List ==
Release date	Film	Notes
1910	Romeo and Juliet	Banned in Ontario.
1916	Damaged Goods	Banned in Ontario.
1931	Little Caesar	Banned in Alberta, British Columbia, and Nova Scotia.
1937	The Life of Emile Zola	Banned in Quebec. Available in Quebec since 1997 with a "G" rating.
1939	Thugs with Dirty Mugs	Banned in Winnipeg, Manitoba, because censors "felt the film was just an excuse to show criminal activity." Available in Winnipeg on DVD as part of the Looney Tunes Golden Collection: Volume 3.
1946	Scarlet Street	Banned in New Brunswick.
1946	Wicked Lady	Banned in New Brunswick.
1947	Forever Amber	Banned in Quebec. Available in Quebec since 1994 with a "G" rating.
1953	The Wild One	Alberta, British Columbia, and Quebec banned the film. Available in Quebec from 1968 to 2013 with a "14+" rating and since 2013 with a "G" rating.
1956	Baby Doll	Originally banned in Alberta in 1957.
1960	Elmer Gantry	United Artists withdrew the film from release in the Ontario province on 4 August 1960, after star Burt Lancaster objected to Ontario censor O.J. Silverthorne's removal of a racy line of dialogue. The ban on the film lasted only a week; the cut version began showing at the Carlton theater in Toronto with a Restricted rating on 18 August, though it only was a modest box office success in the city. The uncut version is available on DVD with a G rating under the Canadian Home Video Rating System.
1963	Tom Jones	Alberta banned the film. After two years, the decision was reversed and it was allowed to be shown.
1967	Who's Afraid of Virginia Woolf?	Nova Scotia censors banned the film, describing it as "obscene and blasphemous". After an appeal from the distributor and media coverage, the decision was later reversed and the film was released with a "Restricted" rating
1967	Warrendale	Manitoba banned the film due to the language. However, due to public outcry, the decision was reversed.
1970	On est au coton	The National Film Board of Canada blocks the release of Denys Arcand's controversial documentary. An edited version is released in 1976, but the original unedited version was not released until 2004.
1970	Women in Love	The Alberta censors banned the film due to nudity.
1971	A Clockwork Orange	Alberta and Nova Scotia banned the film. Alberta reversed the ban in 1999. The Maritime Film Classification Board has also reversed the ban. Both jurisdictions now grant an R rating to the film.
1972	Pink Flamingos	Edited in several provinces, with Nova Scotia banning it outright until 1997.
1973	Heavy Traffic	Banned in Alberta.
1974	The Texas Chain Saw Massacre	Banned in Alberta in 1975.
1976	Blood Sucking Freaks	Banned in Ontario when classified for a videocassette release.
1976	In the Realm of the Senses	Banned in Ontario because the censors deemed it contained "degradation, explicit and prolonged scenes of sexual activity, undue emphasis on human genitals, and its representation of a person under 16 in sexual context".
1978	Pretty Baby	Banned in Ontario and Saskatchewan on the basis of scenes in which star Brooke Shields, then aged thirteen, was photographed in the nude. The ban was repealed in 1995.
1978–1996	Faces of Death	Series of mondo films banned in Ontario, Quebec and British Columbia.
1979	Beneath the Valley of the Ultra-Vixens	Banned in Nova Scotia.
1980	Caligula	Banned by all provinces except British Columbia, which received a Restricted rating with a warning. Edited versions were later passed. The 156-minute "unrated" version was passed in British Columbia by the BC Film Classification Office. The uncut version was banned again in Ontario in 2000 for a theatrical reissue due to "sexual violence" "bestality" and "incest". It has subsequently been reevaluated and approved with an R rating in the Maritimes and in Ontario.
1980	The Tin Drum	Edited, and later banned outright as child pornography by the Ontario Film Classification Board.
1981	Not a Love Story	The feminist documentary critique of the pornography industry was itself banned in Ontario for its pornographic content, although that decision was ultimately reversed.
1981	Beau-père	French film about a man having sex with a minor was banned in Ontario.
1981	The Best of sex and violence	Banned in Ontario in 1986.
1983	I Spit on Your Grave	Banned in Nova Scotia until 1998.
1984	The Toxic Avenger	Ontario censors banned the film after only watching the first 40 minutes due to "graphic and prolonged scenes of gratuitous violence, torture, crime, cruelty, horror, rape, degradation to humans and animals and exploitation of the blind and children, as well as indignities to the human body in an explicit manner". A softer version missing a lot of the gore was passed with a restricted rating after several cuts were made.
1984	Silent Night, Deadly Night	Banned in Ontario in 1987.
1985	Day of the Dead	Banned in Ontario and the Maritimes, with a cut, 97 minute version passed in Ontario. The original 101 minute version was resubmitted to the Ontario Film Review Board in 1998 and given a R rating when released on VHS. In 2008 the rating was changed to 14A. The 101-minute version has also been granted an R rating in the Maritimes.
1986	Killer Party	Banned in Ontario.
1986	Blue Velvet	A David Lynch film that was banned by the New Brunswick Film Classification Board due to its prevalence of sexually explicit scenes and of heavily violent scenes. New Brunswick now uses the ratings provided by the Maritime Film Classification Board, which granted an R rating.
1987	Hellraiser	Initially banned in Ontario because of "Brutal, graphic violence with blood-letting through, horror, degradation, and torture." Passed with a Restricted rating after New World Mutual agreed to cut 40 seconds of violence.
1989–1993	Death Scenes	Video series is banned in Nova Scotia.
1992	Dead Alive	U.S. unrated version banned in Ontario, however the heavily cut U.S. R-rated version was approved with a Restricted rating.
1992	Tokyo Decadence	Briefly banned in Ontario in early 1994. The distributor appealed and the censor allowed the film to play only in "select venues".
1994	Exit to Eden	Temporarily banned by the Saskatchewan Film and Video Classification Board. The controversy surrounding the ban and the film itself ultimately led to Saskatchewan disbanding its classification authority, handing classification of films over to the British Columbia Film Classification Office in a 1997 bilateral agreement.
2000	Baise-moi	Banned in Ontario in 2000. The ban was lifted in 2001 with the film being passed with a 'Restricted' rating after 13 seconds were removed.
2001	Fat Girl	Banned in Ontario in 2001 because the censor board deemed the film depicted underage sex. The ban was lifted in 2003 with the film being passed with an "R" rating.
2003	Steve-O: Out on Bail	Banned in Ontario because of two scenes of explicit defecation that were deemed to have no artistic merit.
2006	Bumfights	This series of shot-on-tape reality productions, is banned in seven of the thirteen provinces and territories; the remaining give it an R rating. As of 2016, the films are still banned in Quebec.

== See also ==
- List of banned films
- Cinema of Canada
- Film censorship
