= Squeeze (1980 film) =

1980 film by Richard Turner

- Directed by: Richard Turner
- Written by: Richard Turner
- Produced by: Richard Turner
- Starring: Robert Shannon; Paul Eady; Donna Akersten
- Cinematography: Ian Paul
- Edited by: Jamie Selkirk
- Music by: Andrew Hagen; Morton Wilson
- Production company: Trilogic Film Productions
- Release date: July 1980
- Running time: 79 minutes
- Country: New Zealand
- Language: English

Squeeze is a New Zealand drama film, written, produced and directed by Richard Turner and released in 1980. The film stars Robert Shannon, Donna Akersten and Paul Eady.

The film premiered in July 1980 in Auckland, and had its North American premiere in October 1980 at the Chicago International Film Festival. It was subsequently screened in selected markets in 1981, including Sydney and Los Angeles, and at the 1981 Festival of Festivals in Toronto.

== Synopsis ==
The film revolves around Grant, a bisexual businessman torn between his relationships with his fiancée Joy and his boyfriend Paul .

== Cast ==
- Robert Shannon as Grant
- Paul Eady as Paul
- Donna Akersten as Joy
- Peter Heperi as Riki
- David Herkt as John
- Faye Flegg as Kate
- Eileen Swann as Linda
- Arthur Wright as David
- Lynne Robson as Dave's wife
- Sandy Gauntlett as Jeremy
- Martyn Sanderson as Paul's father
- Dinah Russell as Paul's mother

== Background ==
The film, made six years before homosexuality was decriminalized in New Zealand, was refused funding by the New Zealand Film Commission, and instead its $100,000 budget was funded almost entirely by individual donors within Auckland's LGBT community.

== Release ==
The film premiered in July 1980 in Auckland, and had its North American premiere in October 1980 at the Chicago International Film Festival. It was subsequently screened in selected markets in 1981, including Sydney and Los Angeles, and at the 1981 Festival of Festivals in Toronto.

== Critical response ==
Kevin Thomas of the Los Angeles Times reviewed the film positively, writing that "What is most important about 'Squeeze' is the steadfast compassion with which it views its hero…’Squeeze' is a drama of most painful self-discovery, well-acted and heightened by an aptly moody, restless score." Thomas criticized the score, but still thought that the execution matched the theme the film tried to make.

George Williams of the Sacramento Bee also criticized the film's audio, writing that the dialogue was sometimes "nearly unintelligible as it is mixed in with the background noise of street scenes and confrontations in gay bars", but concluded that the film was redeemed especially by the strength of Shannon and Eady's performances.

Meaghan Morris of the Sydney Morning Herald criticized the portrayal of Joy as "like something out of the 1950s", and characterized some of its dramatic scenes as something akin to soap opera, but praised Shannon's performance and wrote that the film is "worth seeing just for the evocation of the streetlife of Auckland".

== Soundtrack ==
The movie's title derives from the song Squeeze by Toy Love. The film features the song along with music from other Auckland post-punk bands, The Features and the Marching Girls.

== See also ==
- Cinema of New Zealand
- List of New Zealand films
- List of films set in New Zealand
- List of feature films with bisexual characters
- List of LGBTQ-related films of 1980
