= Craig Crawford =

American political commentator

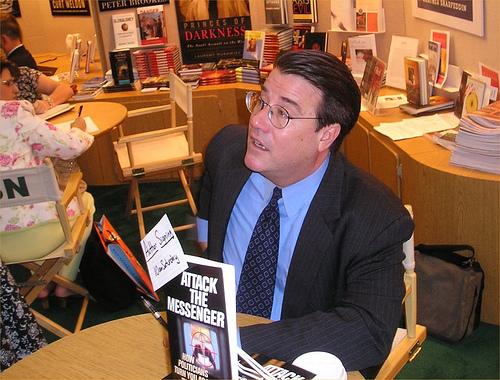
- Born: 1956 (age 69–70); Owensboro, Kentucky, U.S.
- Education: Stetson University (BA, JD)
- Occupations: Lawyer, Writer
- Political party: Democratic

Craig Crawford (born 1956) is an American writer and television political commentator based in Washington, D.C. Publisher of the news commenting forum, Trail Mix, Crawford was a columnist for Congressional Quarterly, Editor-in-Chief of National Journal's The Hotline, and Washington Bureau Chief for The Orlando Sentinel, and the author of Listen Up Mr. President: Everything You Always Wanted Your President to Know and Do, The Politics of Life: 25 Rules for Survival in a Brutal and Manipulative World, and Attack the Messenger: How Politicians Turn You Against the Media.

== Early years ==
Craig Crawford was born in Owensboro, Kentucky. During his childhood, Crawford moved with his family to Orlando, Florida, where he attended Pineloch Elementary School and Oak Ridge High School. His parents, Tabitha and Bill Crawford, encouraged his interest in public affairs. When he was nine years old, Crawford had the opportunity to meet President Lyndon B. Johnson. While still in high school, Crawford served as a page to Republican Senator Ed Gurney. In 1976, while attending Stetson University, he worked on Jimmy Carter's presidential campaign. After the 1976 election, Crawford transferred to American University in Washington to intern in the Carter White House press office. Crawford graduated from Stetson University (1978) and Stetson University College of Law (1981). He has been a member of the Florida Bar since 1982.

== Career ==
While beginning his law practice, Crawford worked for Democratic candidates John Glenn and Walter Mondale. In 1982, he was an unsuccessful candidate for Florida's state legislature as a Democrat. Crawford joined the staff of the Orlando Sentinel in 1985 as a legal affairs and politics reporter. In 1989, he moved to the paper's Washington bureau. In 1997, Crawford left the Sentinel to run The Hotline until 2003, when he joined Congressional Quarterly leading to his work for NBC, CNBC and MSNBC.

Crawford publicly resigned from MSNBC on March 5, 2010. In the comments section of his Congressional Quarterly blog, he wrote, "i [sic] simply could not any longer endure being a cartoon player for lefty games."

Crawford was a regular contributor to the John Batchelor and Paul Alexander radio show, broadcast from WABC - AM, New York. He also appeared on the CBS Early Show as a political contributor. Crawford was also a frequent guest on the Imus in the Morning radio/TV simulcast.

In 2005, Crawford released the book "Attack The Messenger: How Politicians Turn You Against The Media" which talks about "the role of politicians in taking advantage of that public distrust of the media."

In the 2008 Presidential campaign, Crawford defended Hillary Clinton and Bill Clinton following President Clinton's response to a press question about why it "takes two of you" to beat Barack Obama. On January 26, 2008 Crawford appeared on the MSNBC program Morning Joe defending his position toward the Clintons. and Crawford appeared again on Morning Joe on January 29, 2008 to further defend his statements.

In 2015 Crawford was hired to serve as Communications Director for the presidential campaign of former Sen. Jim Webb (D-VA). Following the campaign, Crawford resumed his work as publisher of the political commentary site TrailMix.cc, which he has operated since 2005.

== Personal life ==
Crawford is openly gay. He married David Blank in the District of Columbia in 2013.

== Works ==
- Listen Up Mr. President: Everything You Always Wanted Your President to Know and Do. (with co-author Helen Thomas) (Charles Scribner's Sons, 2009) ISBN 1-4391-4815-5
- The Politics of Life: 25 Rules for Survival in a Brutal and Manipulative World (Rowman & Littlefield, 2007) ISBN 0-7425-5250-0 - a kind of updated Machiavelli.
- Attack the Messenger: How Politicians Turn You Against the Media.(Rowman & Littlefield, 2005) ISBN 0-7425-3816-8
