= Kiss and Tell collective =

Canadian performance and artist collective

Kiss & Tell is a performance and artist collective whose work is concerned with lesbian sexuality, based in Vancouver, British Columbia. In the late 1980s, collective members Persimmon Blackbridge, Lizard Jones, and Susan Stewart came together to explore debates within the queer community around lesbian sexual practice.

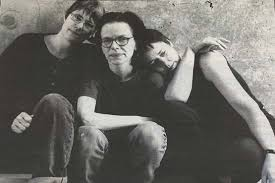
Portrait of Kiss & Tell (left to right: Persimmon Blackbridge, Lizard Jones, and Susan Stewart), 1998, photograph by Della McCreary.

Their landmark exhibition was called Drawing the Line and was first held at Vancouver's Women in Focus Gallery in 1988. Their photographs depicted a continuum of lesbian sexual practice ranging from kissing to bondage to voyeurism. The project encouraged gallery viewers to comment on what they saw and how it made them feel by writing directly on the walls around the prints; allowing the viewer to "draw the line" and examine their ideas and beliefs about different sexual behaviors. "Drawing the Line" was made in response to the "porn wars" of the late 80's-the feminist debate of if female sexual imagery was more oppressive to women, or if it was empowering to women.

Kiss & Tell's work explicitly embraced depictions of female sexuality, and encouraged the conversation between anti-porn feminists and sex positive feminists. The art was controversial, even more so as it was released in the era of the Red Hot Video Store bombings. The collective displayed their work to point out the double standard in which artists exploring politics and sexuality are "cause for alarm" and yet adult films and magazines that are much more explicit are of no concern, as well as desensitizing the public view of queer sex and relationships. Through the intimate exploration of queer bodies, the Kiss & Tell collective gave space for lesbians to perform and share their experiences. The show traveled widely in Canada and the United States in the 1990s, as well as showing in Australia and the Netherlands. In the summer of 2015 Kiss & Tell had redisplayed and revisited their exhibition "Drawing the Line." This was featured at the Vancouver Queer Arts Festival in celebration of the work's 25th anniversary, and was the first time in 13 years that it had been displayed.

Group member Lizard Jones remembers the impact of the show in her community of Vancouver, and beyond: "There was/is a lot to say, and a lot to learn from audiences at our talks. Our first performance piece... True Inversions, evolved quite directly from those experiences, from a desire to say things that were non-verbal, visual, or more emotive, things that had no place in talks".

True Inversions was a multi-media performance that caused a similar stir across the country, and resulted in the book, Her Tongue on my Theory: Images, Essays and Fantasies in 1995. It had a good reception and won the Lambda Literary Award's Small Press Book Award. Lorna Boschman directed three videos about Kiss & Tell: Drawing the Line (1992), True Inversions (1992), and Before the New Millennium (2007).

Kiss & Tell premiered That Long Distance Feeling: Perverts, Politics & Prozac in Vancouver in November 1997.

In 2025, with the Art Canada Institute, author Kristen Hutchinson published the book Kiss & Tell: Lesbian Art & Activism. This resource, available for free in English and French, explores the groundbreaking contributions of the collective alongside some of the most seismic debates in contemporary discourse including censorship, queer bodies and representation, disability, art as activism, and the feminist sex wars.

== Artist biographies ==
- Persimmon Blackbridge is a visual artist and writer whose work has focused on lesbian sex and sexual representation, disability culture, and the mental illness system. Born in 1951 in Columbus, Ohio, she is a sculptor, writer, curator, and performer based on Hornby Island in British Columbia. Blackbridge has since been the winner of a 1991 VIVA award, a 1995 Lambda Award, a Ferro Grumley Fiction Prize in 1997, the 1998 Van City Book Award, and an Emily Carr Distinguished Alumni Award in 2000.
- Emma Kivisild, known by the pseudonym Lizard Jones, is a visual artist, award-winning writer, and performer from Vancouver, born in 1961. Her novel, Two Ends of Sleep, was published by Press Gang Publishers in 1997.
- Susan Stewart is a photographer and videographer born in Vermont in 1952, who moved to Canada at age 21. She has been producing photography and multi-media performance works since 1978. She also teaches and has an M.F.A. from Simon Fraser University. Her most recent work, "Lovers & Warriors: aural/photographic collaborations," was an installation produced in collaboration with 25 women, mostly lesbians, which explores issues of gender, marginality, and the politics of photographic representation.

== Bibliography ==
- Kiss & Tell: Lesbian Art & Activism by Kristen Hutchinson. Art Canada Institute: Toronto, 2025.
- Kiss & Tell Drawing The Line: Lesbian Sexual Politics on the Wall. Vancouver, B.C.: Press Gang Publishers, 1991.
- Kiss & Tell (Persimmon Blackbridge, Lizard Jones, and Susan Stewart). Her Tongue on My Theory: Images, Essays and Fantasies. Vancouver, B.C.: Press Gang Publishers, 1994.
- Blackbridge, Persimmon and Sheila Gilhooly. Still Sane. Vancouver, B.C.: Press Gang Publishers, 1985.
- Blackbridge, Persimmon. Sunnybrook: A True Story With Lies. Vancouver, B.C.: Press Gang Publishers, 1996.
