= Hearts of Hate =

- Directed by: Peter Raymont
- Music by: Mark Korven
- Country of origin: Canada

Production
- Producer: Peter Raymont
- Editor: Nick Hector

Original release
- Release: 1995

Hearts of Hate is a 1995 Canadian television documentary film about the Canadian White Supremacist movement of the early to mid-1990s.

== Synopsis ==
The 51-minute film profiles the four most active groups in Canada at the time; Heritage Front, Aryan Nations, Church of the Creator and Canadian Liberty Net.

== Summary ==
Directed and produced by Peter Raymont, the film primarily studies the involvement of young Canadians in the activities of these groups, which were making frequent headlines at the time in Canada. The documentary was intended for in-classroom viewing, though it aired nationally on CTV.

Interviews in the documentary include Wolfgang Droege, deceased leader of the Heritage Front, George Burdi, former lead singer of RaHoWa and Alicia Reckzin, a former member of the Anti-Racist Action.

=== Notes ===
The film erroneously claims that Dunbarton High School is located in Scarborough, Ontario when in fact it is located east in the neighboring city of Pickering.

== Awards and nominations ==
- 1995 Gold Apple Award, National Education Media Competition
- 1995 Yorkton Film Festival Golden Sheaf Award Nominee, Multicultural/Race Relations
