= R v Swain =

- Supreme Court of Canada

Hearing: February 19, 1990 Judgment: May 2, 1991
- Full case name: Owen Lloyd Swain v Her Majesty The Queen
- Citations: [1991] 1 S.C.R. 933
- Docket No.: 19758
- Prior history: Judgment for the Crown in the Court of Appeal for Ontario
- Ruling: Appeal allowed and proceedings stayed.

Holding
- 1) The common law rule allowing the Crown to enter evidence of the accused's insanity over the accused's wishes is unconstitutional. Instead, the Crown must wait until an accused person is found guilty by the trier of fact before raising evidence of insanity over the accused's objections. 2) The automatic detention of people found not guilty by reason of insanity is unconstitutional.

Court membership
- Chief Justice: Antonio Lamer; Puisne Justices: Bertha Wilson, Gérard La Forest, Claire L'Heureux-Dubé, John Sopinka, Charles Gonthier, Peter Cory, Beverley McLachlin, William Stevenson

Reasons given
- Majority: Lamer C.J., joined by Sopinka and Cory JJ.
- Concurrence: Gonthier J., joined by La Forest J.
- Concurrence: Wilson J.
- Dissent: L'Heureux‑Dubé J.
- McLachlin and Stevenson JJ. took no part in the consideration or decision of the case.

R v Swain, [1991] 1 S.C.R. 933 is a leading constitutional decision of the Supreme Court of Canada on certain rights of the mentally ill in their criminal defence. The case concerned a constitutional challenge of the common law rule permitting the Crown to adduce evidence of an accused's insanity and section 542(2) of the Criminal Code, which allowed for the indeterminate detention of an accused who is found not guilty by reason of "insanity". The Court held that both the common law rule and the Code provision were unconstitutional. As a result, the Court created a new common law rule that was constitutional, and Parliament created new laws of what to do with individuals who were found not criminally responsible by reason of a mental disorder. The parties to the case were the appellant, Swain, the respondent, the Crown, and the following interveners: the Attorney General of Canada, the Lieutenant Governor's Board of Review of Ontario, the Canadian Disability Rights Council, the Canadian Mental Health Association, and the Canadian Association for Community Living.

== Background ==
In October 1983, Owen Swain was arrested for attacking his wife and children in a bizarre manner, and was charged with assault and aggravated assault. Later at the trial for the charges, Swain's wife testified that Swain was "fighting the air" and talking about spirits. Swain testified that at the time of the incident, he believed that his wife and children were being attacked by devils, and that he had to protect them.

On November 1, 1983, Swain was transferred from jail to a mental health centre, where he was observed to be acting in a bizarre manner. He was prescribed with antipsychotic medications, and his condition improved rapidly. Swain was granted bail, released into the community, and continued to take his medication and see a psychiatrist. Swain remained out of custody until the conclusion of his trial.

=== Trial ===
Swain's trial took place on May 2, 1985 in the District Court of Ontario (which later became part of what is now known as the Ontario Superior Court of Justice).

Applying the appropriate common law rule at the time, the court allowed the Crown to adduce evidence of Swain's insanity at the time of the alleged offence, over defence counsel's objections. At the end of the trial, Swain was found not guilty by reason of insanity.

As a result of the court's finding, the Criminal Code at the time required that the person be held in custody until the Lieutenant Governor of the Province (i.e. the executive branch of the provincial government) decides to release them.

Defence counsel challenged the constitutionality of that provision, on the basis that it violated the Canadian Charter of Rights and Freedoms. On June 10, 1985, the trial judge found that the provisions were constitutional, and ordered that Swain be detained until the Lieutenant Governor's wishes were known.

=== Subsequent detention ===
Swain immediately filed for an appeal to the Court of Appeal for Ontario, and applied for bail pending appeal. The appeal judge hearing the bail application adjourned the application to permit an early hearing by the committee that advises the Lieutenant Governor concerning the detention of individuals found not guilty by reasons of insanity (the Advisory Review Board).

On June 12, 1985, the Lieutenant Governor issued a warrant further detaining Swain to be held in safe custody in a mental health hospital for assessment, and to report to the Advisory Review Board in 30 days. Neither Swain nor his counsel were notified about the decision, or given an opportunity to make submissions.

The review hearing was held on July 26, 1985, which Swain and his counsel were present at. On August 6, 1985, the Board advised that Swain be held in safe custody in a mental health centre, and that the director of the centre have discretion to allow Swain to re-enter the community with conditions regarding supervision and follow-up treatment. The recommendation was not initially released to Swain or his counsel.

Swain's counsel requested to make submissions before the Lieutenant Governor at the time when the Board's recommendation was made, but before the Lieutenant Governor made a decision, the request was denied.

The Lieutenant Governor issued a warrant for Swain to be held in custody with the conditions recommended by the Board. That was the first time Swain or his counsel were advised what the Board's recommendation was.

=== Court of Appeal ===
The appeal to the Court of Appeal was heard in early September, 1985. A majority of the Court dismissed Swain's appeal.

=== Discharge ===
On September 4, 1986, the Lieutenant Governor ordered that the warrant for Swain to be held in custody be vacated, and that Swain be discharged absolutely.

== Reasons of the Supreme Court of Canada ==
Chief Justice Lamer wrote the majority decision, allowing Swain's appeal. Two separate decisions concurring with the majority's final decision were released by Gonthier and Wilson JJ. The sole dissenting judge was L'Heureux-Dubé J.

=== Crown adducing evidence of insanity ===
At the time of the case, Canadian common law allowed the Crown to adduce evidence of an accused person's insanity at the time of the alleged offence during the Crown's case over the objections of the accused.

The majority found that a principle of fundamental justice required an accusatorial and adversarial criminal justice system, founded on respect for the autonomy and dignity of human beings. Therefore, the same principle required that an accused person has the right to control his or her own defence (assuming the person is found fit to stand for trial).

The majority found that since the defence of insanity is an exemption to criminal liability, based on not being capable to form the criminal intent, it is a defence to the criminal charge, and therefore should not be interfered with by the Crown.

The majority went on to find that if the Crown independently raised the defence of insanity, it could be inconsistent with the defence an accused person intends to rely on, putting the accused in a position of having to argue inconsistent defences. For example, the defence of insanity could be inconsistent with the defence of alibi. It could also undermine the accused's credibility with the jury, due to the stigma associated with the mentally ill.

The majority also concluded that the accused's right to control their own defence is not an absolute right. For example, if an accused person puts their mental health at issue without going so far as to claim the defence of insanity, the Crown is entitled to "complete the picture".

The majority agreed with the Crown that the principles of fundamental justice also required that a person who was insane at the time of an offence not be convicted of that offence. However, the majority found that still did not excuse breaching another principle of fundamental justice.

Since the common law rule caused an accused person to lose their liberty, and since it violated a principle of fundamental justice, the majority found that the common law rule infringed section seven of the Canadian Charter of Rights and Freedoms. The majority did not need to decide whether it also violated other sections of the Charter.

The majority went on to find that the common law rule failed the Oakes test for a justified limitation of the Charter under section one of the Canadian Charter of Rights and Freedoms. Specifically, although the objective justified the limitation (avoiding convicting a person who was insane at the time of the offence but refuses to raise the issue, and protecting the public from mentally ill people who require treatment), and there was a rational connection between the objective and the means to carry out that objective, the means was not minimally intrusive of the Charter right being violated.

As a result, the majority created a new common law rule that was minimally intrusive. The new rule only allows two instances of when the Crown can lead evidence of insanity. The first instance is when the trier of fact has concluded beyond a reasonable doubt that the accused is otherwise guilty of the charges before the court (as it will no longer interfere with the accused's other defences). The second instance is if the accused's own defence has put his or her mental capacity for criminal intent at issue.

The majority also concluded that the new common law rule would not infringe section 15 of the Canadian Charter of Rights and Freedoms (the equality section). This was because the new rule would not treat the mentally ill unequal in the courts, and would not create new burdens on the mentally ill.

In her concurring judgment, Wilson J. reached a similar reasoning with the majority, and agreed with the new common law rule. In his concurring judgment, Gonthier J. agreed with the majority's conclusions and the new rule, but disagreed with some of the alternatives considered by the majority.

In her dissenting judgement, L'Heureux-Dubé J. found that the old common law rule did not infringe sections 7 or 15 of the Charter, and in fact was reflective of the principles of fundamental justice.

=== Federalism ===
In Canadian law, the federal and provincial governments have exclusive authority to legislate in certain areas (see Canadian federalism). Since the Criminal Code is a federal statute, an issue was whether the provision requiring the automatic detention by a person found not guilty by reason of insanity - until released by the Lieutenant Governor - was outside the federal government's authority to legislate, or whether it fell within provincial jurisdiction over health matters.

The majority found that the pith and substance of the provision was "to protect society against dangerous individuals". A preventative law such as this was considered to be a valid part of criminal law, which the exclusive authority of the federal government. The majority felt it was important to note that the legislative provisions dealt with supervision of the person, not treatment of the person, and the focus was on what was in the interests of the public.

In their concurring judgments, Wilson and Gonthier JJ. agreed with the majority's decision. Although dissenting in other areas, L'Heureux-Dubé J. agreed with the majority on this point.

=== Constitutionality of automatic detention ===
The majority found that the legislative provisions gave no discretion to the trial judge. Instead, the provisions required the judge to order the person's detention without any hearing on the issue of the person's mental state. Subsequent hearings cannot change that fact.

Since the detention is automatic with no standards or criteria that can be applied, the majority found that the law was arbitrarily detaining individuals, and violated section nine of the Canadian Charter of Rights and Freedoms.

The majority went on to find that the legislation failed the Oakes test for a justified limitation of the Charter under section one of the Canadian Charter of Rights and Freedoms. Specifically, although all the parties agreed that the objective was substantial (detaining individuals who may be dangerous due to their mental health), and that there is a rational connection between the objective and the means, it was not minimally intrusive.

The majority noted that there was no minimum time before the Lieutenant Governor was required to make their decision known. In fact, the legislation does not require the Lieutenant Governor to ever make an order. The majority felt that minimally intrusiveness required that a person be held no longer than necessary to determine their mental state.

In her concurring judgment, Wilson J. agreed with the majority's conclusion, but disagreed with a comment made by the majority that there is a presumption that discretion conferred by statute would be exercised in a manner that is in compliance with the Charter. In his concurring judgment, Gonthier J. agreed with the majority. In her dissenting decision, L'Heureux-Dubé J. found that the legislative scheme was constitutional.

=== Disposition ===
As a result of the majority's findings, Swain's finding of not guilty by reason of insanity was overturned. While normally a new trial should be ordered, the specific circumstances in this case did not warrant it: Swain had been acquitted (by reason of insanity) and had been absolutely discharged. A new trial would be unfair to Swain, but entering a full acquittal would also be inappropriate. Therefore, the court entered a judicial stay of proceedings.

Although the court's reasons found that the legislative scheme was unconstitutional, and therefore of no force and effect, the majority crafted a six-month transitional period to allow Parliament to create a new legislative scheme. The period was extended by the court to February 5, 1992.

== Aftermath ==
As a result of the legislative scheme being struck down, Parliament created a new legislative scheme in 1992.

The insanity defence was replaced with being found not criminally responsible by reason of a mental disorder".

If a person was "not criminally responsible", the court is no longer required to automatically detain the person. Instead, the court can enter their own disposition or refer the person to the independent Review Board for disposition. The possible dispositions are: detention in hospital, conditional discharge, or absolute discharge. The new legislation requires that the least restrictive or onerous disposition be imposed, bearing in mind public safety, the mental condition of the accused, and the goal of reintegration into society. The role of the Lieutenant Governor in these decisions was abolished, and their decision-making duties were transferred to the Review Boards.

== See also ==
- List of Supreme Court of Canada cases (Lamer Court)
