= The Effeminists =

American gay political advocacy group

The Effeminists was a political and social advocacy group composed primarily of gay men in the 1970s who concerned themselves with allying the gay liberation movement with women and the feminist movement at the time. The group was borne out of the Gay Liberation Front (GLF), when some members expressed disagreement with the ways in which women were being treated by the gay liberation movement.

== Origin ==
In the 1970s, groups such as the Lavender Menace arose out of many queer women's discomfort with the treatment of lesbian and bisexual women within the gay liberation front. Some men began to be more outspoken about this, such as those who formed the Effeminists.

The Effeminists was a consciousness-raising group born out of the Gay Liberation Front in 1969, by GLF members Kenneth Pitchford, John Knoebel, and Steven Dansky. They established themselves with a radical manifesto written in prose by Pitchford, titled "The Flaming Faggots" [sic]. They formed a more autonomous group, separate to the GLF, in response to the misogynistic views they alleged were present within the GLF.

In the manifesto, Pitchford expressed his views that many leftist groups, including gay liberation groups, had pervasive misogyny embedded within them. He particularly pointed out his belief that many male leftists were misogynistic towards women within their organizations.

The Effeminists raised the need for a group of radical, anti-heteropatriarchy gay men within the gay liberation movement, as they alleged that the GLF was having issues with sexism. Female members of the Gay Liberation Front were increasingly pulling back their involvement, due to the alleged misogyny. The Effeminists pointed out that poor treatment and sexual harassment towards women in the movement was occurring in many New Left organizing spaces, and that without addressing it, liberation could not be achieved.

The group focused on communication and increasing visibility of the issues they concerned themselves with, rather than recruiting. In the summer of 1970, effeminist literature was distributed by GLF activist Allen Young; then in 1973 another manifesto was published in an effeminists-specific magazine, called "Double-F: A Magazine of Effeminism". Two years prior, in 1971, University of California, Berkeley students Jim Rankin and Nick Benton launched a newspaper entitled, "The Effeminist". As a small group, literature distribution was important to the Effeminists, as it enabled them to increase their reach to others within the gay liberation movement and the New Left through magazines or essays.

Steven F. Dansky shared that, in hindsight, the group seemed to have focused far more on this literature distribution rather than recruitment; while this contributed to the group's short span of existence, it allowed for their viewpoint to be spread more broadly across the area.

== Ideology ==
The Effeminists expressed critiques of straight male leftists who embraced hyper-masculine or machismo identities. They centralized their concerns around the issues of misogyny and homophobia, but also remained explicitly anti-imperialist, anti-racist, and anti-capitalist. In addition to being anti-sexist, this was in line with the broader views and political interests of the New Left.

The Effeminists also expressed concerns and critiques of the ways in which gay men experience masculinities and identity, such as the difficulties gay men face to achieve hegemonic masculinity. They also acknowledged the struggles heterosexual men faced, too, for not being able to express affection towards other men.

Kenneth Pitchford and other members of the Effeminist movement then became involved across the United States. Kenneth Pitchford, for example, traveled across the US for a short period of time to spread the word of the Effeminists. One such example of this is his involvement in the Flaming Faggots Collective's activism at New College of Florida in fall of 1971. This particular satellite group staged a protest at a speaking engagement at the college with Dr. Benjamin DeMott. Members of The Flaming Faggots Collective alleged his political opinions of feminist and gay topics to be homophobic and misogynistic. After being shut out of a board of trustees meeting, students walked along the seawall to attend. This is one of a few demonstrations conducted by Effeminist groups.

== Controversies ==
The Effeminist movement as a whole expressed views (particularly within their written literature) that were anti-camp, anti-transvestism [sic], and anti-sado-masochism. Their later analysis of gender expression, gender identity, and sex led them to conclude that the issue at hand is much more complex than they originally interpreted it.

Many years later, leaders such as Pitchford and Dansky expressed that those views were incorrect; particularly, that transgender people have an expanded, rather than a reduced, understanding of gender. In an essay reflecting on the Effeminists, Steve Dansky recalls, "I found their [transgender people’s] narratives compelling and challenged the social construction of an immutable binary gendered world. On rethinking transgender these decades later, it's evident that we, as effeminists, had a very elementary understanding of the construction of gender".

In a 2010 interview, Pitchford shared that, "...in this period in my life, I am re-examining, very closely, the anti-tranvestisim [sic] ... And, I'm trying to look at those things, and see that, perhaps, there's another way to look at them... So, my thinking is changing a lot... A lot of the things, you know, the trimmings, are not right."
