= Falls Church News-Press =

Weekly newspaper in Falls Church, Virginia

- Type: Weekly newspaper (Thursdays)
- Format: Tabloid
- Owner(s): Benton Communications, Inc.
- Publisher: Nicholas Benton
- Editor-in-chief: Nicholas Benton
- Founded: 1991
- Language: English
- Headquarters: 105 N. Virginia Avenue, Suite 310, Falls Church, VA 22046
- Circulation: 9,900 (as of 2021)
- OCLC number: 37046234
- Website: fcnp.com

The Falls Church News-Press is a weekly newspaper in Falls Church, Virginia. The periodical was founded in 1991 by Owner/Editor-in-Chief Nicholas F. Benton.

The newspaper was named CityPaper's "Best Remnant of the Liberal Media" for 2008.

== Origins ==
Nicholas F. Benton grew up in California and moved to Falls Church in the late 1980s after getting a hired as a White House correspondent with Executive Intelligence Review. A few years later Benton started Falls Church News-Press in March 1991.

== Content ==
Te paper keeps up with the effect local news has on matters with national importance, though not always with widespread approval. For example, when the namesake Falls Church was the subject of a contentious split in the Episcopalian/Anglican denomination, the News-Press reported the details.

== Circulation ==
In 2006, it was delivered in Bailey's Crossroads, Sleepy Hollow, Pimmit Hills, Lake Barcroft, and City of Falls Church regions.

In 2024, the newspaper introduced a $10 a month paywall and a pilot program to deliver papers by mail instead of dedicated delivery routes.
