= Nicholas F. Benton =

American activist

- Born: February 9, 1944 (age 81); Ross, California
- Education: Westmont College (B.A., 1965), Pacific School of Religion (M.Div., 1969)
- Occupations: Owner, publisher, and editor-in-chief of the Falls Church News-Press

Nicholas F. "Nick" Benton (born February 9, 1944) is the founder, owner, and editor of the Falls Church News-Press, a weekly newspaper distributed free in Falls Church, Virginia, and in parts of Fairfax County, and Arlington County.

== Life and work ==
Born in Ross, California, Benton earned a degree in English from Westmont College in 1965. He obtained a master of divinity degree in 1969 from the Pacific School of Religion in Berkeley, California. He became a contributor to the underground newspaper Berkeley Barb, during which time he came out as gay. Benton was an early member of the Berkeley Gay Liberation Front and wrote the first editorial for the newspaper Gay Sunshine. Benton also co-produced a pair of issues for The Effeminist.

From 1974 to the late 1980s, Benton worked with the Lyndon LaRouche organization, initially as a political organizer, and later as a reporter for LaRouche's Executive Intelligence Review.

Benton founded the Falls Church News-Press in March 1991. In addition to being the editor and main contributor to the News-Press, Benton writes for local publications such as the Metro Weekly.

== Personal life ==
Benton has been married and divorced three times; he has no children. He lives in Falls Church.

== Works ==
- Benton, Nicholas (1970). Theology, the church and homosexual liberation. OCLC 44087262. Length: 8, [3] leaves.
- Benton, Nicholas (1971). God and My Gay Soul. Berkeley, California: The Committee of Concern for Homosexuals. OCLC 27410982. An 11-page mimeographed pamphlet. Several sources ascribe this work to 1971, although Benton himself says he wrote it in 1970.
- Benton, Nick (1971). Sexism, Racism and White Faggots in Sodomist Amerika. Berkeley, California: The Effeminist. ASIN B000727IEC. OCLC 25184403. Length: 15 pages.
- Laurents, Arthur (1971). "Reminiscences of Arthur Laurents: oral history, 1971" (Interview). Hollywood film industry project. Interviewed by Nicholas Benton and Judith Green. OCLC 122598174. Transcript: 26 leaves. Tape: 1 cassette.
- Benton, Nick (2013). Extraordinary Hearts: Reclaiming Gay Sensibility's Central Role in the Progress of Civilization. Lethe Press. ISBN 9781590213926. OCLC 853618574. Length: 344 pages.
- Benton, Nick (2018). Gay Men in the Feminist Revolution. BCI Press.
- Benton, Nick (2021). Education of a Gay Soul. BCI Press.
