= Matthew Seeger =

American academic

Matthew W. Seeger
- Born: Matthew Wayne Seeger; June 17, 1957 (age 68); Greenfield, Indiana
- Education: B.A., Communication, M.A., Communication Theory; Ph.D., Communication Theory and Research
- Alma mater: University of Evansville, Northern Illinois University, Indiana University
- Occupation: Professor
- Employer: Wayne State University
- Title: Professor of Communication
- Spouse: Beth
- Children: 2

Matthew W. Seeger (born June 17, 1957, in Greenfield, Indiana) is a Professor of Communication and Dean Emeritus at Wayne State University.

== Education ==
Matthew W. Seeger completed his undergraduate degree at the University of Evansville in 1979. Seeger developed an interest in crisis communication while covering the Air Indiana Flight 2016 crash that was carrying the University of Evansville’s basketball team, the Purple Aces for the school newspaper. Soon after, he received his M.A. in Communication Theory from Northern Illinois University. In 1983, Seeger received his Ph.D. in Communication Theory and Research from Indiana University.

== Career ==
Seeger was appointed Dean of Wayne State University’s College of Fine, Performing & Communication Arts in 2011 and served until 2022.

Prior to the appointment, Dr. Seeger served as an Assistant Dean of Wayne State University’s Graduate School, and Chair of the Department of Communication.

== Academic interests ==
His research concerns crisis communication and risk communication, health promotion and communication, crisis response and agency coordination, the role of media, including new media, crisis and communication ethics, failure of complex systems and post-crisis renewal. Seeger helped develop the discourse of renewal theory “as a framework that emphasizes learning from the crisis, ethical communication, communication that is prospective in nature, and effective organizational rhetoric."

He is the author/co-author of several books, including The Handbook of International Crisis Communication Research; Effective risk communication: A message-centered approach; Organizational communication ethics: Decisions and dilemmas, Theorizing Crisis Communication, Narratives of crisis: Telling stories of ruin and renewal, Communication in times of trouble and Communication and Organizational Crisis. He has published over 200 peer-reviewed journal articles and chapters. He was the founding editor of The Journal of International Crisis and Risk Communication Research (JICRCR). Seeger assisted in the development of the Crisis and Emergency Risk Communication framework for the Centers for Disease Control and Prevention and the World Health Organization risk communication guidelines. Seeger also participated in major investigations of the Flint water crisis.

== Achievements and awards ==
- National Communication Association – Member
- Central States Communication Association – Member
- International Communication Association – Member
- Gerald M. Phillips Award for Distinguished Applied Communication Scholarship, National Communication Association, 2017
- Service Engagement Award, National Communication Association, 2015
- Hall of Fame Award, Public Relations Society of America – Detroit Chapter, 2014
- H. A. WICHELNS MEMORIAL AWARD for Speech and Law, National Communication Association 1989
