= Peter Raymont =

Canadian filmmaker (born 1950)

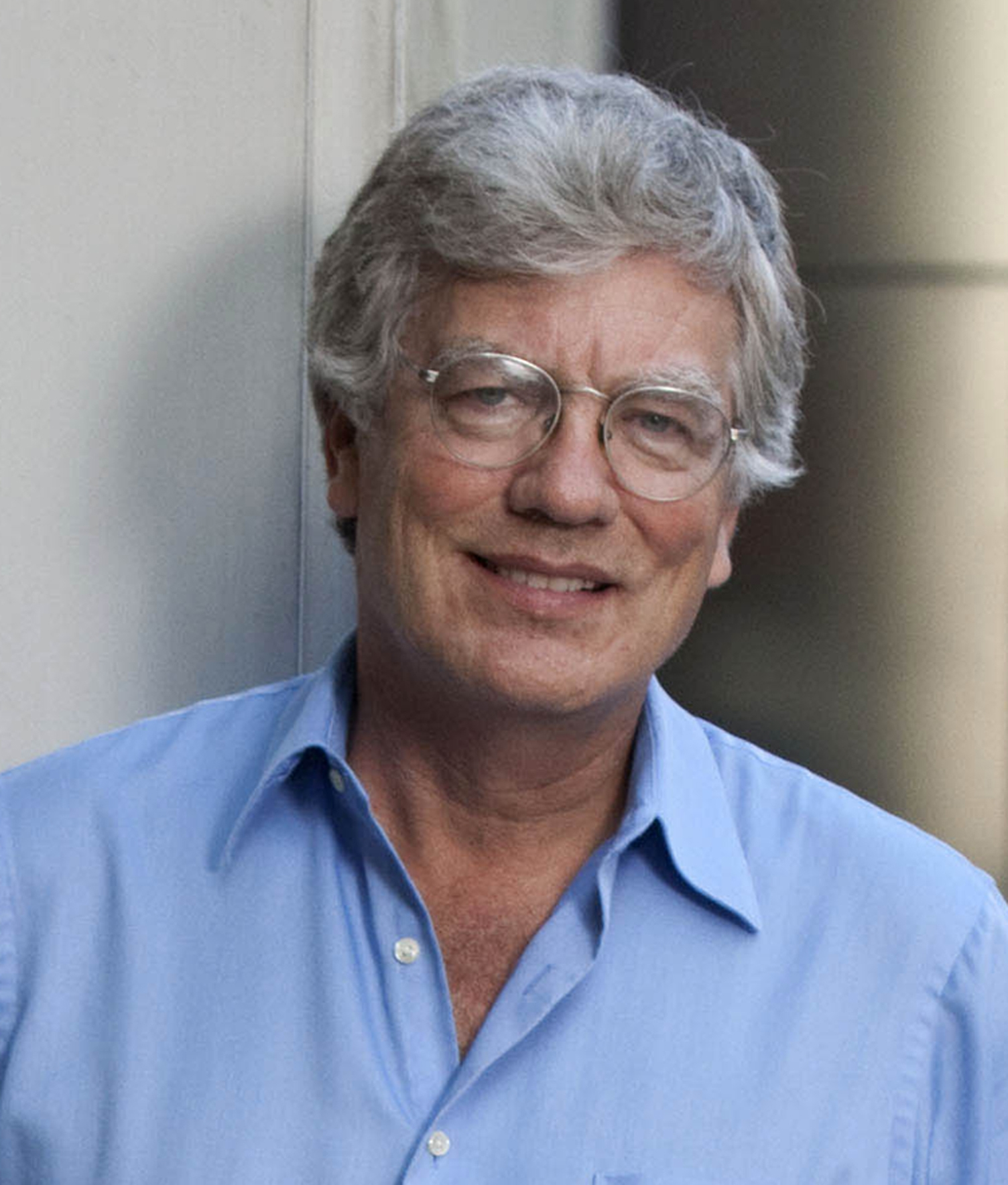
- Born: February 28, 1950 (age 76); Ottawa, Ontario, Canada
- Occupations: film director, screenwriter, producer, film editor & cinematographer
- Years active: 1971-present
- Spouse: Lindalee Tracey (May 14, 1957 - October 19, 2006) her death
- Website: Official website

Peter Raymont (born February 28, 1950) is a Canadian filmmaker and producer and the president of White Pine Pictures, an independent film, television and new media production company based in Toronto. Among his films are Shake Hands with the Devil: The Journey of Romeo Dallaire (2005), A Promise to the Dead: The Exile Journey of Ariel Dorfman (2007), The World Stopped Watching (2003) and The World Is Watching (1988). The 2011 feature documentary West Wind: The Vision of Tom Thomson and 2009's Genius Within: The Inner Life of Glenn Gould were co-directed with Michèle Hozer.

== Education ==
Raymont attended Crighton Street School, Rockcliffe Park Public School and Lisgar Collegiate Institute. He graduated from Trinity College School in Port Hope in 1968.

At Queen's University in Kingston, Ontario he was honoured with the Tricolour Award for contribution to the university community. Raymont graduated from Queen's University in 1971 with a Bachelor of Arts, majoring in Political Science and Film Studies. Raymont is a graduate of The Canadian Centre for Advanced Film Studies in North York, Ontario (First Year, 1988), now the Canadian Film Centre. He was a co-founder of the Canadian Independent Film Caucus, now The Documentary Organization of Canada and is a member of The Directors' Guild of Canada and The Canadian Media Producers' Association.

== Early career ==
Raymont's career began at age 21 at the National Film Board of Canada in Montreal. From 1971 to 78, he worked as an editor, director and producer. While at the NFB, Raymont also taught film and video production in the Canadian Arctic. In 1978, Raymont moved to Toronto and established his independent film and television production company, Investigative Productions now operating as White Pine Pictures. He co-partnered the company for many years with his late wife, award-winning filmmaker and author Lindalee Tracey.

== Career ==
Raymont was executive producer of the television drama series The Border, which he co-created with Lindalee Tracey, Janet MacLean and Jeremy Hole, and Cracked, a Toronto-based police procedural which explores the intersection of the law and mental illness. Cracked's 2 seasons are also broadcast in France, Germany, USA and elsewhere.

Raymont's documentary feature Shake Hands with the Devil: The Journey of Roméo Dallaire was honoured with the 2005 Audience Award for World Cinema Documentaries at The Sundance Film Festival and the 2007 Emmy Award for Best Documentary. A Promise to the Dead: The Exile Journey of Ariel Dorfman was longlisted for the 2007 Academy Award for Best Documentary Feature.

Genius Within: The Inner Life of Glenn Gould premiered at the 2009 Toronto International Film Festival, followed by invitational presentations at the International Documentary Film Festival in Amsterdam (IDFA) and several other festivals worldwide (Full Frame, Vancouver, Seattle, Sydney, Melbourne, Hawaii, Bermuda). The film opened theatrically across Canada, USA and Australia in 2010, playing in over 50 US cities. A two-hour version of the film was broadcast on the PBS series American Masters in December, 2010. Genius Within won the 2010 Gemini Award for Best Biography Documentary presented by the Canadian Academy of Cinema and Television, and was short-listed for an Academy Award for Best Documentary Feature.

In 2015 Raymont received an Honorary Doctor of Letters Degree from Trent University

In 2019 he was named the winner of the Don Haig Award at the Hot Docs Canadian International Documentary Festival.

== Filmography ==
=== Film ===
Year	Title	Director	Producer	Writer
1970	Blue	Yes	Yes	No
1971	Have You Ever Been North of Princess Street?	Yes	Yes	No
1977	Flora: Scenes from a Leadership Convention	Yes	No	No
1978	The Art of the Possible	Yes	No	No
1979	History on the Run: The Media and the ’79 Election	Yes	Yes	No
1981	Magic in the Sky	Yes	Yes	No
1982	Arctic Spirits	Yes	Yes	No
1982	Falasha: Agony of the Black Jews	Yes	No	No
1983	On to the Polar Sea: A Yukon Adventure	Yes	No	Yes
1983	Prisoners of Debt: Inside The Global Banking Crisis	Yes	No	Yes
1986	At The Brink: The Cuban Missile Crisis	Yes	No	No
1987	The Politics of Aid	Yes	No	No
1988	The World Is Watching	Yes	No	Yes
1990	Between Two Worlds	No	Yes	No
1992	Voices From the Shadows	Yes	Yes	No
1993	Chasing the Dream	Yes	Yes	No
1994	Hearts of Hate: The Battle for Young Minds	Yes	Yes	No
1995	Abby, I Hardly Knew Ya	No	Yes	No
1995	The Skeptic’s Journey	Yes	No	No
1997	Invisible Nation: Policing the Underground	No	Yes	No
1997	Passing the Flame: The Legacy of Women’s College Hospital	No	Yes	No
1999	Rwanda: In Search of Hope	Yes	Yes	No
2002	King of Hearts	Yes	No	No
2003	Into the Light	Yes	Yes	No
2003	The World Stopped Watching	Yes	Yes	No
2003	Arctic Dreamer: The Lonely Quest of Vilhjalmur Stefansson	Yes	Yes	No
2004	Shake Hands with the Devil: The Journey of Roméo Dallaire	Yes	Yes	No
2004	Bhopal: The Search for Justice	Yes	Yes	No
2004	The Killer Cure	No	Yes	No
2005	The Idealist: James Beveridge, Film Guru	No	Yes	No
2007	A Promise to the Dead: The Exile Journey of Ariel Dorfman	Yes	Yes	No
2007	Tsepong: A Clinic Called Hope	No	Yes	No
2008	Worlds Collide: The Saga of Herschel Island	No	Yes	No
2008	I Nuligak: An Inuvialuit History of First Contact	No	Yes	No
2008	Tar Sands: The Selling of Alberta	No	Yes	No
2008	Radical Dreamer: The Passionate Journey of Graham Spry	Yes	Yes	No
2008	Triage: Dr. James Orbinski’s Humanitarian Dilemma	No	Yes	No
2009	Genius Within: The Inner Life of Glenn Gould	Yes	Yes	No
2009	Hugh Hefner: Playboy, Activist and Rebel	No	Yes	No
2010	Pets on Prozac	No	Yes	No
2010	Experimental Eskimos	No	Yes	No
2010	Winds of Heaven: Emily Carr, Carvers and The Spirit of The Forest	No	Yes	No
2010	The Team	No	Yes	No
2010	Prosecutor	No	Yes	No
2011	West Wind: The Vision of Tom Thomson	Yes	Yes	No
2012	Fight Like Soldiers, Die Like Children	No	Yes	No
2014	Guantanamo's Child	No	Yes	No
2014	Painted Land: In Search of the Group of Seven	No	Yes	No
2015	Premier: The Unscripted Kathleen Wynne	No	Yes	No
2016	All Governments Lie: Truth, Deception and the Spirit of I. F. Stone	No	Yes	No
2009	Margaret Atwood: A Word After a Word after a Word is Power	Yes	Yes	No
2022	Ice-Breaker: The 1972 Summit Series	No	Yes	No

Executive producer

- PTSD: Beyond Trauma (2017)
- The Truth Is In The Stars (2017)
- The Corporate Coup D'État (2018)
- Toxic Beauty (2019)
- Once Were Brothers: Robbie Robertson and The Band (2019)
- The Price of Cheap (2021)
- Sleeping Warrior (2021)
- Unloved: Huronia's Forgotten Children (2022)
- Buffy Sainte-Marie: Carry It On (2022)
- Balancing Act (2023)
- Plastic People: The Hidden Crisis of Microplastics (2024)
- Shadow Man: William Stephenson and the Art of Political Warfare (2024)

=== Short film ===
Year	Title	Director	Producer	Writer	Editor
1972	Just Another Job	No	No	No	Yes
1972	The Point: Community Legal Clinic	Assistant	No	No	Yes
1973	The Innocent Door	No	Associate	No	Yes
1974	The Coldspring Project	No	Associate	No	Yes
1975	The Forest Watchers	Yes	No	Yes	No
1975	Sikusilarmiut	Yes	Yes	No	No
1975	Lumsden	Yes	No	No	No
1975	Natsik Hunting	No	Yes	No	No
1977	The Hunters	No	Yes	No	No
1977	River: Planet Earth	Yes	No	No	No
1977	Whale Hunting	No	Yes	No	No
1978	Reflections of a Leadership Convention	Yes	No	Yes	Yes
1985	With Our Own Two Hands	Yes	Yes	No	No
1987	The Brokers	Yes	Yes	No	No
1989	Only The News That Fits	Yes	Yes	No	No

=== Television ===
Year	Title	Director	Producer	Notes
1990	As Long As the Rivers Flow	No	Yes	5 x 1hr episodes
1997	The New Ice Age: A Year in the Life of the NHL	Yes	Yes	6 episodes
1998	A Scattering of Seeds	No	Yes	52 x ½ hr episodes
2000	Toronto: City of Dreams	No	Yes	3 x 1hr episodes
2001	Graveyard Shift	Yes	Yes	6 x ½ hr episodes
2002	The Undefended Border	Yes	Yes	3 x 1 hr episodes
2003	The Anatomy of Burlesque	No	Yes	2 x 1 hr episodes
2003	The Hero’s Hero: The Forgotten Life of William Barker	No	Executive	
2007	The Border	No	Executive	38 x 1hr episodes
2009	City Sonic	No	Yes	20 episodes
2012	Cracked	No	Executive	
2015	Where the Universe Sings: The Spiritual Journey of Lawren Harris	Yes	Yes	
2016	Arctic Secrets	No	Yes	8 x 1 hr episodes
2016	Girls' Night Out	No	Yes	
2017	We Are Canada	No	Executive	6 x 1 hr episodes
2018	In the Making	No	Executive	16 x ½ hr episodes
2020	CitizenKid: Earth Comes First	No	Executive	
2021	Wild Pacific Rescue	No	Executive	3 x 1 hr episodes

== Awards ==
- International Emmy Award Winner for Best Arts Programming - Buffy Sainte Marie 2023
- Allan King Award for Excellence in Documentary (Guantanamo's Child), 2016
- Academy of Television Arts & Sciences
- NEWS AND DOCUMENTARY EMMY AWARD - Best Documentary 2007
- GENIE AWARD

Gemini Awards:

- Best Sports Program or Series 1999
- Best History-Biography Documentary, 2004
- Best Direction of a Documentary, 2004
- Best Biography Documentary, 2010

Canadian Film and Television Awards

- Best Documentary 1983

Sundance Film Festival

- AUDIENCE AWARD - World Cinema Documentary, 2005

Philadelphia Film Festival

- JURY AWARD - Best Documentary, 2005

Chicago International Film Festival

- SILVER HUGO - Best Social/Political Documentary 1991
- GOLD HUGO - Best Social/Political Documentary 1988
- GOLD PLAQUE - Social/Political Documentary 1983

American Film Festival, New York City

- Blue Ribbon, Best Social/Political Documentary 1976
- Red Ribbon Social/Political Documentary 1983

Nyon International Documentary Film Festival, Switzerland

- Sesterce d'Argent, 1990
- Ecumenical Prize and Second Public Jury Prize, 1988

Leipzig International Film Festival

- Best Short Documentary 1976
- International Jury Award, 1991

Festival International de Programmes Audiovisuels (FIPA), Biarritz, France

- Special Jury Mention, 2004
- Honourable Mention, 2004

Association of Canadian Television and Radio Artists, ACTRA Awards

- Top Ten Award, 1999
- Best Writing, TV Documentary 1984

Yorkton International Film Festival, Canada

- Best Documentary, Sports/Recreation and Best Cinematography 1985
- Best Broadcast Documentary 1991
- Best Documentary 2010

Alberta Film and Television (AMPIA)

- Best Documentary 1986

International Arctic Film Festival (Rovaniemi, Finland)

- Special Award, Television 1986

23rd International Festival of Short Films (Cracow, Poland)

- Polish National Peace Committee Prize, 1986

National Film and Video Association, Oakland, California

- Bronze Apple 1990, Gold Apple 1991, Bronze Apple 1994, Gold Apple 1995

Worldfest Houston

- Gold, Special Jury Prize, 2001
- Gold Award for Documentary Series 2000
- Special Jury Prize, 2000
- Gold Award for Sports Documentary 1999
- Gold Medal for Best Documentary Television Series 1998
- Silver Award 1992, Certificate of Merit-Finalist 1995

Academy Awards, Los Angeles, USA

- Honourable Mention, Documentary category, 1983

Berlin Film Festival

- Honourable Mention, Peace Prize Committee 1989
