= Community Living Ontario =

Canadian non-profit organization

- Formation: 1953
- Type: Charitable Organization
- Purpose: Advocacy on behalf of people with intellectual disabilities to be fully included in all aspects of community life.
- Region served: Ontario, Canada
- Members: 105 Affiliates
- Chief Executive Officer: Chris Beesley
- Parent organization: Canadian Association for Community Living
- Website: communitylivingontario.ca
- Formerly called: Ontario Association for Community Living

Community Living Ontario (formerly Ontario Association for Community Living) is a non-profit organization in Ontario, Canada, for people with intellectual disabilities.

Community Living Ontario is a confederation of more than 105 local associations (known as affiliates) and a provincial affiliate of Inclusion Canada.

== History ==
Community Living Ontario was founded on April 27, 1953, as the Ontario Association for children with intellectual disabilities. In 1987, the name of the organization was changed to the Ontario Association for Community Living. In 2008, Community Living Ontario added eight new affiliates. In 2009, Community Living Ontario and its local affiliate members saw the closure of three remaining mass institutions for people with intellectual disabilities in Ontario. The Community Living movement is celebrated in Ontario every May with Community Living Month, highlighted by Community Living Day in the Legislative Assembly of Ontario.

== Advocacy ==
The organization has been noted by a book as "one of the most influential advocacy groups in Canada" for people with intellectual disabilities.

It promotes inclusive education so that people with intellectual disabilities can "go with their neighbourhood friends, to their neighbourhood schools where they further their growth and development together.". It also advocates for the inclusion of individuals with intellectual disabilities in all aspects of community life. This includes advocating for de-institutionalization, with a major milestone realized in 2009 when Minister of Community and Social Services Madeleine Meilleur proclaimed the closure of Rideau, Huronia and the Southwest Regional Centres. On April 1, 2009, Community Living held its 10th Annual Day at the Legislature, where close to 300 people—including people who have an intellectual disability, their families and friends, volunteers, and staff of Community Living associations, and other community advocates—joined at Queen's Park to celebrate the closures and the dawning of a new era in Ontario.

In advocating for de-institutionalization one of Community Living Ontario's current concerns is the trend toward placements in nursing homes. According to Professor Patricia Spindel, a senior adviser to the organization, people with intellectual disabilities are being increasingly funneled into nursing homes instead of other more appropriate housing options.

Community Living Ontario was also an important contributor to Bill 77, the "Services and Supports to Promote the Social Inclusion of Persons with Developmental Disabilities Act" of 2008. Seven of the fifteen recommendations made by the organization to the Government of Ontario were adopted. "We're very encouraged to see the concept of social inclusion named in this legislation," said Dianne Garrels-Munro, past president of Community Living Ontario.
