= Catherine Frazee =

Canadian academic, writer, and activist

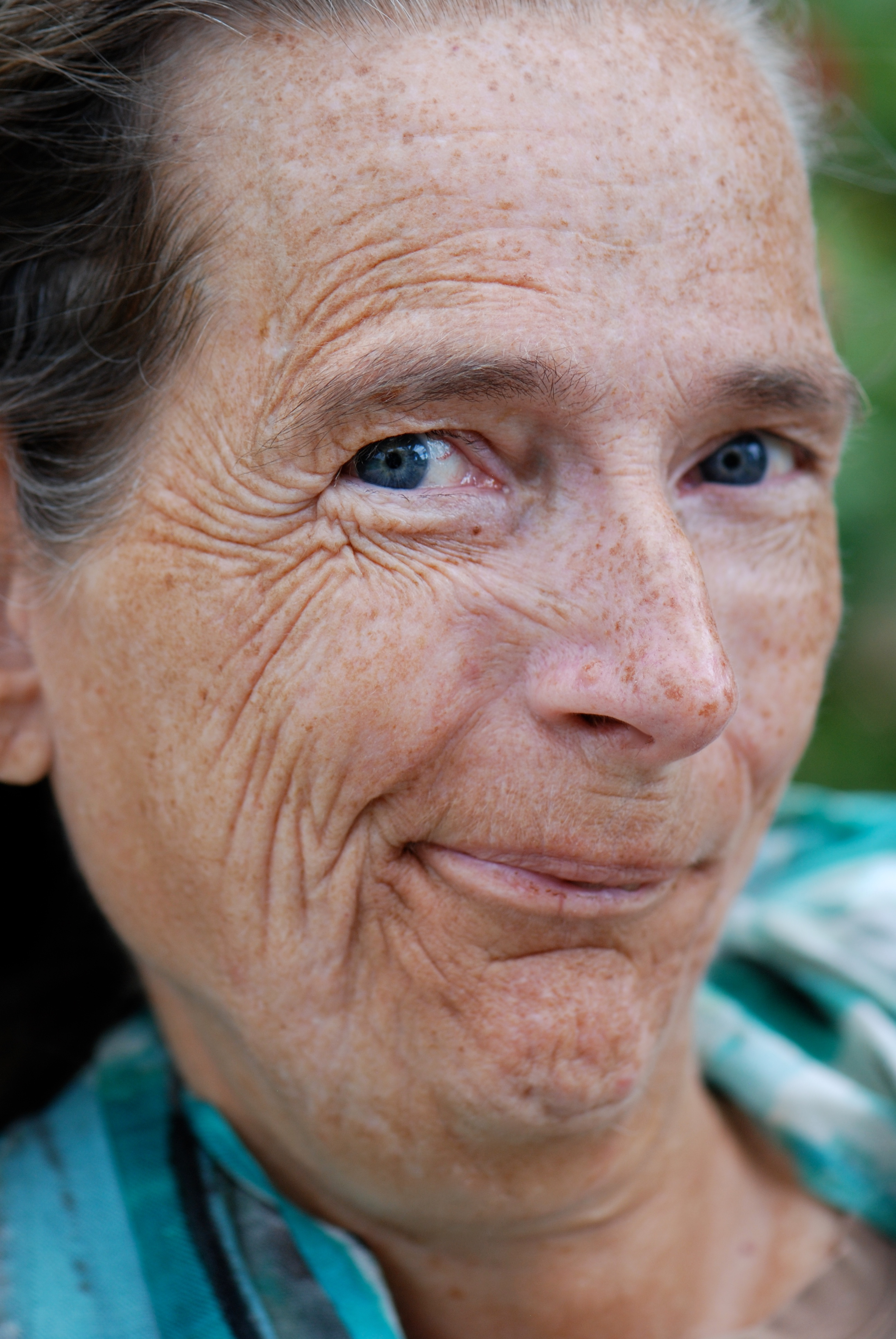
- Catherine Frazee
- Known for: Disability Rights Activist, Chief Commissioner of the Ontario Human Rights Commission
- Awards: Order of Canada

Catherine Frazee OC is a Canadian educator, activist, researcher, poet and writer. She is currently professor emerita in the School of Disability Studies at Toronto Metropolitan University (formerly Ryerson University). Prior to her retirement from Ryerson in 2010, she served for a decade as professor of distinction and as co-director of the Ryerson/RBC Institute for Disability Studies Research and Education. She is known for her role as Chief Commissioner of the Ontario Human Rights Commission from 1989 to 1992. Her father was prominent Canadian banker Rowland Cardwell Frazee.

== Organizations ==
Frazee is a member of DAWN (DisAbled Women's Network Canada)'s Equality Rights Committee and serves on the Board of Directors of the Canadian Abilities Foundation and the Canadian Association for Community Living, chairing that organization's Task Force on Values and Ethics.

From 1989 to 1992, Frazee was the Chief Commissioner of the Ontario Human Rights Commission.

== Honours ==
Frazee was awarded the Arnold Davidson Dunton Alumni Award of Distinction in 1990 by the Carleton University Alumni Association.

In 2014, Catherine Frazee was appointed Officer of the Order of Canada for her advancement of the rights of persons with disabilities, and as an advocate for social justice.

Frazee has been awarded honorary Doctorate degrees from the following four Canadian Universities: University of New Brunswick in 2002, Dalhousie University in 2009, McMaster University in 2015 and Carleton University in 2018.

== Media ==
Frazee, along with humourist David Roche, dancer, choreographer and impresario Geoff McMurchy, writer/artist Persimmon Blackbridge, and director and filmmaker Bonnie Sherr Klein is one of five Canadian artists with diverse disabilities profiled in Klein's 2006 NFB film Shameless: The ART of Disability.

In 1998, Frazee's lecture about the dangers of contemporary eugenics was featured on Canada's Vision TV, commemorating the 50th anniversary of the Universal Declaration of Human Rights. Her publications to date include numerous textbooks, academic journals, and magazine contributions, including articles in Abilities Magazine, ARCHtype, and The Womanist

Frazee served as an external panel member in 2015, which conducted public consultations regarding physician-assisted dying in order to advise the Ministers of Justice and Health regarding the Government of Canada's response to the Carter v. Canada trial.
