= The World Is Watching =

- Directed by: Peter Raymont
- Written by: Peter Raymont; Harold Crooks
- Produced by: Harold Crooks; Peter Raymont; Jim Munro
- Cinematography: Jonathan Collinson; Martin Duckworth; Dan Holmberg
- Edited by: Robert Benson; John Kramer
- Music by: Doug Wilde
- Production company: Investigative Productions
- Release date: 1988
- Running time: 59 minutes
- Country: Canada
- Language: English

The World Is Watching is a Canadian short documentary film, directed by Peter Raymont and released in 1988. The film examines media coverage of the Nicaraguan Revolution through the lens of an ABC News crew on the ground in the country, documenting the various production pressures and limitations that can hamper the efforts of journalists to fully and accurately report a story; its thesis hinges in part on the fact that Nicaraguan president Daniel Ortega's key announcement that he would negotiate with the Contras was made only after the network's news production deadline for the day, leaving the network's initial reports on ABC World News Tonight able to report that he had made a speech but almost completely unable to say anything informative about it.

The film was made with the full participation and support of ABC News anchor Peter Jennings.

Produced for TVOntario and Britain's Channel 4, the film premiered at the 1988 Festival of Festivals. It was subsequently screened at the 1989 Berlin Film Festival, where it received an honorable mention for the Peace Award.

It won the Genie Award for Best Short Documentary Film at the 10th Genie Awards in 1989.

== Sequel ==
In 2003 Raymont released The World Stopped Watching, a sequel film which returned to Nicaragua to document the effects that the Nicaraguan Revolution still had on life in the country. Raymont received a Gemini Award nomination for Best Direction in a Documentary Program at the 19th Gemini Awards in 2004.
