= Bonnie Sherr Klein =

American-Canadian filmmaker and author

- Born: 1941 (age 84–85); Philadelphia, Pennsylvania, U.S.
- Education: Barnard College (B.A.); Stanford University (M.A.)
- Occupation: Filmmaker
- Notable work: Not a Love Story: A Film About Pornography (1981); Shameless: The ART of Disability (2005)
- Spouse(s): Michael Klein (m. 1967, died 2026)
- Children: 2 (Naomi and Seth)
- Relatives: Avi Lewis (son-in-law)

Bonnie Sherr Klein OC (born 1941) is a feminist filmmaker, author and disability rights activist.

== Early life and education ==
Bonnie Sherr Klein was born in Philadelphia, Pennsylvania, in 1941 to working class Jewish parents. She attended public schools until high school, when she then attended Akiba Hebrew Academy. She received a bachelor's degree in American studies at Barnard College, and became more active in the Civil Rights and anti-nuclear movements. After a year of teaching high school, she was admitted to Stanford University for their MA program in theatre. There, she attended a presentation by Claude Jutra and Marcel Carrière from the National Film Board of Canada (NFB). It inspired her to switched her major from theatre to film. Her thesis film, For All My Students, was completed under the supervision of visiting professor George C. Stoney, and was funded by the US Department of Education.

Upon graduation, she was invited to New York to work on some of Stoney's film projects, and gained experience as a freelance editor.

She and her husband, Michael Klein, immigrated to Montreal in 1967 as resisters to the Vietnam War. Soon after, she began to work with the NFB. Her father died in 1969.

== Career ==
John Kemeny hired Klein to work at the NFB's Challenge For Change program. One year later, he resigned and she recommended her mentor, Stoney, who led the program until 1970.

In the Challenge for Change program, Klein co-directed Organizing for Power: The Alinsky Approach (1968), a five-part film series on community organizer Saul Alinsky. With Dorothy Todd Hénaut, she produced the first citizens' community video project, VTR St-Jacques. They provided equipment and training to residents of one of Montreal's poorest neighbourhoods to facilitate community dialogue and organizing. A short documentary was also produced by Klein and Hénaut. Other projects with Challenge for Change include Citizen's Medicine and Little Burgundy.

In 1970, Klein moved to Rochester, New York, and, based on the Challenge for Change model, established Portable Channel, "a community-access media and documentary centre" that was aligned with the guerilla television movement and funded by the New York State Council on the Arts. In 1975, she was invited by her Challenge for Change colleague, Kathleen Shannon, to join the newly formed Studio D, the women's unit of the NFB.

As the only government-funded feminist film production agency, Studio D was committed to making films not just about women or by women, but also about social issues from women's point of view. Klein, an avowed feminist, was one of the first film directors assigned to the studio by the NFB. However, due to shortage of funds for the studio and internal politics, she spent a lot of time organizing training programs, developing film series, and advocating for feminist film productions. "Studio D was a total integration of film and the movement. We were inspired by and inspired the movement," she recalls. "It was really heady. Intellectually it was incredibly stimulating. Every idea was a new idea. Discovering the patriarchy behind every corner. The whole movement about violence against women was unheard of. It was just a soup that was constantly bubbling."

In 1981, Klein made what is probably her best-known film, Not a Love Story: A Film About Pornography. It went on to become one of the most popular and commercially successful films the NFB ever made.

In 1987, Klein had a catastrophic stroke caused by a congenital malformation in her brainstem. She became locked-in, quadriplegic, respirator-dependent, and experienced panic attacks. She spent more than six months in hospital and another three years in formal rehabilitation. She went on permanent disability pension from the NFB and began her work in disability activism, as told in her memoir Slow Dance: A Story of Stroke, Love and Disability (1997) which she co-authored with writer and artist Persimmon Blackbridge. She writes, speaks, consults, and counsels on issues of disability; in particular access, health care, and representation. In 1998, she co-founded kickstART: Disability Arts and Culture, and they held their first festival in 2001.

Klein's most recent film is Shameless: The ART of Disability (2006). She is featured in the film, along with poet and writer Catherine Frazee, humourist David Roche, dancer and choreographer Geoff McMurchy, and Persimmon Blackbridge. Vancouver musician Veda Hille contributed music for the film.

== Honours ==
Klein received a lifetime achievement award from Women in Film and Television Toronto and a Governor General's Award in Commemoration of the Persons Case. She was named a YWCA Woman of Distinction in 1996. In 2012, she was invested as an Officer of the Order of Canada. In his remarks, the Governor General of Canada said, "Bonnie Sherr Klein has used her talents to shed light on social issues and to give voice to the voiceless."

She received two honorary Doctor of Law degrees from Ryerson University in 2003 and from University of British Columbia in 2014.

== Personal life ==
Klein and her husband, Michael, immigrated to Canada in 1967 as resisters to the Vietnam War. The pair have two children. Their daughter is the Canadian journalist and author Naomi Klein. Their son, Seth Klein, was director of the British Columbia office of the Canadian Centre for Policy Alternatives for 22 years.

== Praise and criticism ==
Klein's film Not a Love Story: A Film About Pornography (1981) was instrumental in launching a fierce public debate on pornography across Canada. In 2015, the Toronto International Film Festival screened it as part of their Open Vault series and stated "it remains both timely and essential viewing today."

She has been described as "a radical icon" and "a groundbreaking filmmaker" by Point of View Magazine.

Reflecting on his time at the NFB, George C. Stoney noted "The two women who persuaded us to launch our first community videotape project were no ordinary film-makers. Dorothy Hénaut and Bonnie Klein brought to the task a philosophy about democratic participation that shaped every aspect of the work, from the way to run training classes to the way editorial decisions are made. It is largely their concept, their way of working, which guides social animators, teachers and community leaders generally who are now applying Challenge for Change techniques across Canada."

== Filmography ==
- 1965–1966 Community Mental Health Series (three docu-dramas)
- 1966 For All My Students
- 1966 Last-Chance Children
- 1966 One Fine Day
- 1968 Challenge for Change
- 1968 Introduction to Fogo Island
- 1968 Little Burgundy
- 1968 Organizing for Power: The Alinsky Approach. Series of five films: People and Power; Deciding * to Organize; Building an Organization; Through Conflict to Negotiation; A Continuing Responsibility
- 1969 Opération boule de neige
- 1970 Citizens' Medicine
- 1970 La clinique des citoyens
- 1970 VTR St-Jacques
- 1976 Du coeur à l'ouvrage
- 1976 A Working Chance
- 1977 Harmonie (in French and English)
- 1978 Patricia's Moving Picture
- 1979 The Right Candidate for Rosedale
- 1981 Not a Love Story: A Film about Pornography
- 1982 C'est surtout pas de l'amour : un film sur la pornographie
- 1985 Dark Lullabies
- 1985 Speaking Our Peace
- 1986 A Writer in the Nuclear Age: A Conversation with Margaret Laurence
- 1987 Children of War
- 1987 A Love Affair with Politics: A Portrait of Marion Dewar
- 1988 Mile Zero: The SAGE Tour
- 1988 Le mille zéro : la tournée SAGE
- 1989 Russian Diary
- 2003 KickstART! A Celebration
- 2006 Shameless: The ART of Disability
