= Edward Donnerstein =

Edward I. Donnerstein (born 1945) is an American professor of communication and psychology. His interests include mass media violence and mass media policy.

Donnerstein is the author of over 240 academic publications. He extensively studied the links between exposure to violent media, in particular violent pornography, and aggressive behavior and rape myth acceptance. He was member of many commissions, panels, and task forces related to violence, pornography, and mass media. He made many presentations and took part in various governmental hearings on the above issues.

He was with UC Santa Barbara during 1986–2002, serving as Dean of Social Science and appointed the Arthur N. Rupe Professor of Mass Communication. Before that he was professor of communication at the University of Wisconsin. Since then, he has served as the Dean of the University of Arizona College of Social and Behavioral Sciences (2002-2009) and member of the faculty since then.

== Research ==
Donnerstein was one of the researchers in a 1981 study showing that exposure to violent pornography in which victims are portrayed as enjoying violence -- increased sexual aggression in viewers. Two more of his 1983 studies showed that exposure to violent media, sexual or not, increased aggressive behavior in subjects experiencing social conflict with women.

== Recognition ==
2008: Distinguished Scientific Contribution to Media Psychology award from the American Psychological Association citing "outstanding empirical and/or theoretical contributions to the field of media psychology."

== Personal ==
Donnerstein earned a B.S. in psychology at the University of Florida (1967), and a Ph.D. in psychology from Florida State University (1972).

Donnerstein's spouse is Deborah Levine-Donnerstein, Ph.D. in Administration, Education Leadership and Policy Analysis from University of Wisconsin-Madison (1988).
