= List of LGBTQ-related films of 1985 =

This is a list of lesbian, gay, bisexual, transgender or queer-related films released in 1985. It contains theatrically released films that deal with important gay, lesbian, bisexual, transgender or queer characters or issues and may have same-sex romance or relationships as a plot device.

== Films ==
Title	Director	Country	Genre	Cast	Notes
The Angelic Conversation	Derek Jarman	United Kingdom	Drama	Dave Baby, Timothy Burke, Simon Costin, Christopher Hobbs, Philip McDonald, Toby Mott, Steve Randall, Robert Sharp, Tony Wood, Judi Dench (narrator) and Paul Reynolds	Juxtaposition of slow moving photographic images while Dench reads the sonnets of William Shakespeare
Aqueles Dois	Sérgio Amon	Brazil	Drama	Pedro Wayne, Beto Ruas	a.k.a. Those Two Based on the story of the same name by Caio Fernando Abreu
Avenging Angel	Robert Vincent O'Neil	United States	Action	Betsy Russell, Rory Calhoun, Susan Tyrrell	
The Berlin Affair	Liliana Cavani	Italy; West Germany	Drama	Gudrun Landgrebe, Kevin McNally, Mio Takaki, Hanns Zischler, Andrea Prodan, Massimo Girotti, Pieter Daniel, William Berger, John Steiner, Edward Farrelly, Philippe Leroy and Claudio Lorimer	Based on the novel Quicksand by Jun'ichirō Tanizaki
The Boys Next Door	Penelope Spheeris	United States	Drama	Charlie Sheen, Maxwell Caulfield	
Buddies	Arthur J. Bressan Jr.	United States	Drama	Geoff Edholm, Damon Hairston, Joyce Korn, Billy Lux, David Rose, Libby Saines, David Schachter, Susan Schneider and Tracy Vivat	First film to deal with the AIDS pandemic
La Cage aux Folles 3: The Wedding	Georges Lautner	France; Italy	Comedy	Michel Serrault, Ugo Tognazzi, Antonella Interlenghi	
A Chorus Line	Richard Attenborough	United States	Musical, comedy, drama	Michael Douglas, Alyson Reed, Terrence Mann, Sharon Brown, Michael Blevins, Yamil Borges, Jan Gan Boyd, Gregg Burge, Cameron English, Tony Fields, Audrey Landers, Nicole Fosse, Vicki Frederick, Michelle Johnston, Janet Jones, Pam Klinger, Charles McGowan, Justin Ross, Blane Savage and Matt West	Based on the musical of the same name
Colonel Redl	István Szabó	Austria; Hungary; West Germany	Drama	Klaus Maria Brandauer, Hans Christian Blech, Armin Mueller-Stahl, Gudrun Landgrebe, Jan Niklas, László Mészáros, András Bálint, László Gálffi, Dorottya Udvaros, Károly Eperjes, Róbert Rátonyi and Flóra Kádár	Based on the play A Patriot for Me by John Osborne, which itself is based on the true story of Alfred Redl
The Color Purple	Steven Spielberg	United States	Drama	Whoopi Goldberg, Desreta Jackson, Danny Glover, Oprah Winfrey, Margaret Avery, Táta Vega, Akosua Busia, Adolph Caesar, Willard Pugh, Rae Dawn Chong, Laurence Fishburne, Grand Bush, Dana Ivey, Leon Rippy, Bennet Guillory, James Tillis and Leonard Jackson	Based on the epistolary novel of the same name by Alice Walker
Consenting Adult	Gilbert Cates	United States	Drama	Marlo Thomas, Martin Sheen, Barry Tubb, Talia Balsam	TV movie; based on the novel of the same name by Laura Z. Hobson
Desert Hearts	Donna Deitch	United States	Romance, drama	Helen Shaver, Patricia Charbonneau, Audra Lindley, Andra Akers, Gwen Welles, Dean Butler, James Staley, Katie La Bourdette, Alex McArthur, Tyler Tyhurst, Denise Crosby and Antony Ponzini	Based on the novel Desert of the Heart by Jane Rule
Dona Herlinda and Her Son	Jaime Humberto Hermosillo	Mexico	Romance, comedy, drama	Arturo Meza, Marco Treviño (credited as Marco Antonio Treviño), Guadalupe Del Toro, Letícia Lupercio, Josefina González, Lucha Villa and Guillermina Alba	
An Early Frost	John Erman	United States	Drama	Aidan Quinn, Sylvia Sidney, Ben Gazzara, Gena Rowlands, Sydney Walsh, Terry O'Quinn, John Glover, Bill Paxton, D.W. Moffett, Cheryl Anderson, Christopher Bradley, Sue Ann Gilfillan, Don Hood, Barbara Hey and Scott Jaeck	
Extramuros	Miguel Picazo	Spain	Drama	Carmen Maura, Mercedes Sampietro, Aurora Bautista, Assumpta Serna, Antonio Ferrandis, Manuel Alexandre, Conrado San Martín, Valentín Paredes, Marta Fernández Muro, Beatriz Elorrieta, Cándida Losada, Maite Brik, Amparo Valle, Maria Caro and Mari Paz Molinero	
Just One of the Guys	Lisa Gottlieb	United States	Comedy	Joyce Hyser, Clayton Rohner, Billy Jacoby, Toni Hudson, William Zabka, Leigh McCloskey, Sherilyn Fenn, Arye Gross and Kenneth Tigar	
Kiss of the Spider Woman	Hector Babenco	Brazil; United States	Drama	William Hurt, Raúl Juliá, Sonia Braga, José Lewgoy, Milton Gonçalves, Míriam Pires, Nuno Leal Maia, Fernando Torres, Patricio Bisso, Herson Capri, Denise Dumont, Antônio Petrin, Wilson Grey and Miguel Falabella	Based on the novel of the same name by Manuel Puig
The Court of the Pharaoh	José Luis García Sánchez	Spain	Comedy, musical	Ana Belén, Fernando Fernán Gómez, Antonio Banderas, Josema Yuste, Agustín González, Quique Camoiras, Mary Carmen Ramírez, Juan Diego, Guillermo Montesinos, María Luisa Ponte, Millán Salcedo, Antonio Gamero, Luis Ciges, Guillermo Marín and Pedro Farrés	a.k.a. La corte de Faraón
Mishima: A Life in Four Chapters	Paul Schrader	United States	Biography, drama	Ken Ogata, Kenji Sawada, Toshiyuki Nagashima	Based on the life and work of Yukio Mishima
My Beautiful Laundrette	Stephen Frears	United Kingdom	Romance, drama	Gordon Warnecke, Daniel Day-Lewis, Saeed Jaffrey, Roshan Seth, Derrick Branche, Rita Wolf, Souad Faress, Richard Graham, Shirley Anne Field and Stephen Marcus	
A Nightmare on Elm Street 2: Freddy's Revenge	Jack Sholder	United States	Horror	Mark Patton, Kim Myers, Robert Rusler	
No Sad Songs	Nik Sheehan	Canada	Documentary	Jim Black, Catherine Hunt, Jim St. James and David Sereda	
November Moon	Alexandra von Grote	West Germany; France	Romance, war, drama	Maurice Arama, Daniel Berlioux, Denise Boulet, Antonin Brunel, Nicole Camus, Marc Delestre, Danièle Delorme, Albert Delpy, Ingrid Dupont, Wolfgang Finck, Robert Florent, Stéphane Garcin, René Geney, Andreas Grothusen, Alexander Hauff, Christiane Millet and Gabriele Osburg	aka Novembermond
Seduction: The Cruel Woman	Monika Treut	West Germany	Drama	Mechthild Großmann, Udo Kier, Sheila McLaughlin, Carola Regnier, Peter Weibel, Georgette Dee, Judith Flex, Barbara Ossenkopp, John Erdman, Daniela Ziegler, Katorka Takerka, Karin Roewer-Nennemann, George Lannan and Juerg Schlachter	aka Verführung: Die grausame Frau Inspired by the novella Venus in Furs by Leopold von Sacher-Masoch
Westler	Wieland Speck	West Germany	Romance, drama	Sigurd Rachman, Rainer Strecker, Andy Lucas, Frank Rediess, Andreas Bernhardt, Sasha Kogo, Hans-Jürgen Punte, Zazie de Paris, Harry Baer, Christoph Eichhorn, Jörg Uwe Dost, Thomas Kretschmann, Georges Stamkowski and Andrew Kelner	
