= Forget Magazine =

Canadian literary magazine

- Editor: Kent Bruyneel
- Categories: Literary
- Frequency: Variable
- Founder: Kent Bruynee
- First issue: February 12, 2001; 24 years ago
- Company: Forget Magazine
- Country: Canada
- Based in: Vancouver, British Columbia
- Language: English
- Website: forgetmagazine.com
- ISSN: 1710-193X
- OCLC: 1105223947

Forget Magazine is an online Canadian literary magazine founded on Valentine's Day, 2001, first based in Charlottetown, now based in Vancouver. It has featured original works of poetry, fiction and journalism by first-time authors and well-known Canadian writers.

In an April 2002 on Forget Magazine, Quill & Quire described editor and founder Kent Bruyneel as "a Jack McClelland in the making."
