= Donna Deitch =

American film director

- Born: June 8, 1945 (age 81); San Francisco, California, U.S.
- Occupations: Director; producer; writer
- Years active: 1975–present
- Known for: Desert Hearts (1985)
- Website: donnadeitch.com

Donna Deitch (born June 8, 1945) is an American film and television director, producer, screenwriter, and actor best known for her 1985 film Desert Hearts. The movie was the first feature film to "de-sensationalize lesbianism" by presenting a lesbian romance story with positive and respectful themes.

== Career ==
=== Desert Hearts (1985) ===
Deitch segued from documentary filmmaker to producing and directing Desert Hearts, the landmark hit of the 1985 Telluride and Toronto International film festivals, and the 1986 Sundance Film Festival. It was picked up for worldwide distribution by The Samuel Goldwyn Company and established Deitch as a prominent lesbian filmmaker. Desert Hearts is an adaptation of Jane Rule's 1964 lesbian novel, Desert of the Heart.

==== Themes ====
The most prominent themes in Desert Hearts include gender, sexuality, and family, specifically the ways in which lesbian identity can subvert Western-Colonial standards and ideals. This is witnessed through the setting of Reno, Nevada and the Western structures that the main characters navigate while carrying on a secret relationship. The main character, Vivian Bell (Helen Shaver), is a rigid University professor who travels to Reno following a divorce. Cay Rivvers (Patricia Charbonneau) is younger, free-spirited, and impulsive. "In her wildness, Cay embodies the characteristics associated with the reckless male outlaw figure of a traditional Western, even referring to her cottage as her “hideout'," with Vivian representing rigid social structures and repression of sexuality.

Lesbian eroticism and same-sex gaze are prominent themes in Desert Hearts. Deitch demonstrates Vivian and Cay's attraction to each other through subtle glances and touches, as well as the pivotal sex scene between the two towards the end of the film. Deitch uses the women's mutual, exchanging gazes to subvert the typical male gaze formula (a term coined by film theorist Laura Mulvey) where women in film are sexualized by being looked upon voyeuristically as objects. "Vivian and Cay engage in homoerotic visual interchanges that involve mutuality and reciprocity rather than dominance and submission."

==== Reception ====
When Desert Hearts was released, there was little mainstream critical attention towards the film despite its popularity among lesbian and gay audiences. While some praised the film's positive representation of a lesbian relationship, primarily lesbian critics denounced it, many stating that Vivian and Cay are essentially a heterosexual couple "repackaged" into lesbian bodies. For example, Vivian is more passive and "feminine" while Cay is dominant and comfortable with her sexuality, pursuing Vivian and driving their romance forward, imitating the active/passive power dynamic of a heterosexual relationship. Other critics still regard the film to be important within lesbian film history, since it was directed by a lesbian and presents the audience with a "lesbian gaze."

Nevertheless, Desert Hearts was applauded for how it highlighted lesbian struggles in the fifties, since homosexuality was considered a mental disorder until 1973, only eleven years prior to the film's release. Considering Vivian's job as a professor, her career would have been jeopardized if her sexuality were exposed. Real threats of being exposed linger throughout the film, and further reinforce how critics believed Desert Hearts to be pivotal in lesbian cinematic history.

The sex scene at the climax of the film is also highly debated among lesbians due to it being toned down, with some critics stating that it was too tame while others saw it as extremely erotic and intimate. It does not use extreme nudity to attract its viewers, but the connection and chemistry between the two characters, the exchanging looks and soft touches, convey their mutual attraction. Yet, "as the scene progresses, it breaks down this active/passive dichotomy and conveys the mutuality of both women’s attraction to each other."

=== Other works ===
Shortly after seeing Desert Hearts, Oprah Winfrey hired Deitch to direct the Emmy-nominated four-hour miniseries The Women of Brewster Place. Deitch directed, photographed, and edited Angel On My Shoulder, a feature-length documentary about her best friend, actress Gwen Welles, and her experience with terminal cancer. The film won the Gold Hugo for Best Documentary at the 1998 Chicago International Film Festival.

In a 2008 interview, she said she was working on obtaining financing for Blonde Ghost, a screenplay adapted from Stella, the 1992 non-fiction book by Peter Wyden about Stella Goldschlag, which takes place in Berlin during World War II. That same year, Deitch said that she was writing a sequel to Desert Hearts which would be set "in NYC in the late 60s."

== Personal life ==
Deitch is openly lesbian. Her partner is writer Terri Jentz.

== Filmography ==
=== Films ===
Year	Title	Director	Producer	Screenwriter	Cinematographer	Editor	Notes
1975	Woman to Woman	Yes	Yes		Yes	Yes	Documentary
1977	The Great Wall of Los Angeles	Yes					Documentary short
1985	Desert Hearts	Yes	Yes				Cameo appearance: Hungarian Gambler; Winner: Special Jury Prize – Dramatic, Sundance Film Festival, 1986
1994	Criminal Passion	Yes					
1998	Angel on My Shoulder	Yes	Yes	Yes	Yes	Yes	Documentary

=== Actor ===
Year	Title	Role	Notes
1969	Several Friends		Short film
1985	Desert Hearts	Hungarian Gambler	Cameo appearance

=== Television ===
Year	Title	Director	Notes
1989	The Women of Brewster Place		Miniseries
1990	WIOU		1 episode
1991	Prison Stories: Women on the Inside		TV film. Segment "1"
1991	Veronica Clare		1 episode
1992	Sexual Advances		TV film
1994	A Change of Place		TV film
1994	Robin's Hoods		2 episodes
1995	ER		2 episodes
1995-1997	Murder One		5 episodes
1995-2003	NYPD Blue		13 episodes
1996	Second Noah		1 episode
1996	Moloney		1 episode
1997	Murder One: Diary of a Serial Killer		Miniseries (final 6 episodes of Murder One)
1997	EZ Streets		1 episode
1997	Total Security		1 episode
1997	The Visitor		1 episode
1997	Dellaventura		1 episode
1998	Nothing Sacred		1 episode
1998	C-16: FBI		1 episode
1999	The Devil's Arithmetic		TV film
2000	Common Ground		TV film
2000-2001	The $treet		2 episodes
2001-2007	Crossing Jordan		9 episodes
2002-2011	Law & Order: Special Victims Unit		3 episodes
2003	Judging Amy		1 episode
2003	L.A. Dragnet		1 episode
2004	Wild Card		1 episode
2005	South of Nowhere		2 episodes
2006	Bones		1 episode
2006	Heroes		1 episode
2007	Eureka		1 episode
2009-2010	Private Practice		4 episodes
2010	Grey's Anatomy		1 episode
2010	Army Wives		1 episode
2011	Off the Map		1 episode
2011	A Gifted Man		1 episode
2013	The Glades		1 episode
2016	Greenleaf		1 episode

== Accolades ==
Year	Work	Award	Result	Ref
1986	Desert Hearts	Special Jury Prize – Dramatic • Sundance Film Festival	Won	
1986	Desert Hearts	Grand Jury Prize – Dramatic • Sundance Film Festival	Nominated	
1996	NYPD Blue, episode "These Old Bones"	Outstanding Directorial Achievement in Dramatic Series • Directors Guild of America	Nominated	
1998	Angel on My Shoulder	Gold Hugo – Best Documentary • Chicago International Film Festival	Won	
2000	The Devil's Arithmetic	Emmy Award – Outstanding Directing in a Children's Special • National Academy of Television Arts and Sciences	Won	
2008	Heroes	Hugo Award – Best Dramatic Presentation - Long Form • World Science Fiction Society	Nominated	
2008		Outfest Achievement Award • Outfest	Won	

== See also ==
- List of female film and television directors
- List of lesbian filmmakers
- List of LGBT-related films directed by women
