= Contract with the World =

1980 novel by Jane Rule

Contract With the World
- First US edition
- Author: Jane Rule
- Language: English
- Genre: Gay & Lesbian Fiction
- Publisher: Harcourt Brace
- Publication date: 1980
- Publication place: Canada
- Media type: Print Paperback
- Pages: 339 pp
- ISBN: 0-15-122578-8
- OCLC: 57431211

Contract With the World is a 1980 novel written by Canadian author Jane Rule. The story takes place in Vancouver, British Columbia, in the mid-1970s, and is divided in six parts, each focusing on the perspective of a different character. Themes of artistic motivation, personal fulfilment, and sexual politics are present throughout.

== Characters ==
The six primary characters to which each a chapter is devoted are: Joseph (walker), Mike (sculptor), Alma (story writer), Roxanne (recording artist), Allen (photographer/"mourner"), and Carlotta (a painter)
