= Jessica Novak =

American drama television series

- Helen Shaver as Jessica Novak
- Also known as: Close-Up: Jessica Novak
- Genre: Drama
- Created by: Jerry Ludwig
- Written by: Ira Steven Behr
- Starring: Helen Shaver; Lara Parker
- Composer: Fred Karlin
- Country of origin: United States
- Original language: English
- No. of seasons: 1
- No. of episodes: 7 (3 unaired)

Production
- Executive producers: Jerry Ludwig; Marc Merson
- Producer: Paul Waigner
- Running time: 60 minutes
- Production companies: Brownstone Productions; 20th Century Fox Television

Original release
- Network: CBS
- Release: November 5 – December 3, 1981

Jessica Novak is an American drama television series that aired on CBS from November 5 until December 3, 1981 and was written by Ira Steven Behr. The cast includes Helen Shaver, Kip Gilman, Erik Kilpatrick, and Lara Parker. The series was cancelled after only 7 episodes and the last two episodes were only aired in West Germany.

== Synopsis ==
The series focused on Jessica Novak, a news reporter for KLA-TV, who did human interest stories and exposés.

== Cast ==
- Helen Shaver as Jessica Novak
- David Spielberg as Max Kenyon
- Andrew Rubin as Phil Bonelli
- Eric Kilpatrick as Ricky Duran
- Nina Wilcox as Audrey Stiles
- Kenneth Gilman as Vince Halloran
- Lara Parker as Katie Roberts

== Episodes ==
No.	Title	Original release date
1	"Closeup News (pilot)"	November 5, 1981
2	"The Boy Most Likely"	November 12, 1981
3	"Kenny"	November 19, 1981
4	"Man on the Street"	November 26, 1981
5	"Mirrorful of Gamblers"	December 3, 1981
6	"Silent Night"	unaired
7	"The Reward"	unaired
