= Margery Fee =

Professor emeritus of English

- Born: 1948 (age 77–78)

Academic background
- Education: BA, MA, Glendon College, York University; PhD., English, University of Toronto
- Thesis: English-Canadian literary criticism, 1890-1950: defining and establishing a national literature (1992)

Academic work
- Discipline: English
- Institutions: University of British Columbia
- Notable students: Deanna Reder
- Main interests: Aboriginal, Canadian, and postcolonial literatures

Margery Fee (born 1948) FRSC is a professor emeritus of English at the University of British Columbia (UBC). From 2015 to 2017, Fee was the Brenda and David McLean Chair In Canadian Studies at UBC. She publishes in the fields of Canadian, postcolonial and Indigenous studies and Canadian English usage and lexicography.

== Education ==
Fee completed her PhD studies in English at the University of Toronto in 1981, with a dissertation entitled "English-Canadian literary criticism, 1890–1950: defining and establishing a national literature". After earning her PhD, Fee began to take up an interest in Indigenous peoples literature.

== Career ==
=== Early career ===
Because academic jobs in English were scarce in the early 1980s, Fee decided to earn a diploma in applied linguistics at the University of Victoria in order to teach English as a second language (ESL) in Japan. While earning the diploma, she learned of the existence of the Strahy Language Unit at Queen's University. The Unit was founded in 1981 to study the English language in Canada by a bequest from J. R. Strathy, a Queen's alumnus with a lifelong passion for the English language. Two years later, Fee was hired as director of the Unit, replacing W. C. Lougheed. Lougheed had recognized the need for creating a computer-based Canadian English "corpus" of texts, essentially a database of Canadian English. Fee helped obtain a Social Sciences and Humanities Research Council (SSHRC) grant to continue the expansion of the corpus. The resulting Strathy Corpus of Canadian English is a 50-million-word corpus of written and spoken English dated between 1970 and 2010. It is freely available online. Using this corpus, she coordinated with later director Janice McAlpine to publish the Guide to Canadian English Usage in 1997 (1st ed.).

During this period, Fee continued her work on Canadian literature. In 1985, she published Canadian poetry in selected English-language anthologies: an index and guide. In 1992, Fee compiled a collection of essays titled Silence Made Visible: Howard O'Hagan and Tay John. The book also included an interview of Howard O'Hagan, conducted by Keith Maillard in 1979, where he explained his writing process. She published The Fat Lady Dances: Margaret Atwood's "Lady Oracle", a literature review of Margaret Atwood's work in 1993.

=== UBC ===
Fee was hired as an associate professor at the University of British Columbia (UBC) in 1993. She came to UBC with the purpose of teaching First Nations literatures.

Fee served as associate dean of students from 1999 to 2004. In 2005, Fee was awarded the Margaret Fulton Award for her contribution to student development and the university community. She served as director of the Arts One Program and director of the Canadian Studies Program from 2005 to 2008. The year she left her position as director, Fee was honoured as a distinguished scholar in residence at the Peter Wall Institute for Advanced Studies and was the recipient of the Dean of Arts Award.

From 2007 until 2015, Fee was an editor of Canadian Literature, a quarterly journal of criticism and review. She led the team that established CanLit Guides, an open-access resource for the study of Canadian literature. In 2015, Fee was selected as the Brenda and David McLean Chair In Canadian Studies at UBC. That year, her book Literary Land Claims was shortlisted for the 2015 Gabrielle Roy Prize by the Association for Canadian and Québec Literatures. The book analyses texts produced between 1832 and the late 1970s by speakers and writers who resisted nationalist ideas about Canada's claim to land: John Richardson, Louis Riel, E. Pauline Johnson, Archibald Belaney (Grey Owl) and Harry Robinson. Similarly, Fee became a co-Investigator with Daniel Heath Justice and Deanna Reder on a SSHRC-funded project called The People And The Text. The project aimed to collect ignored texts and literature from Indigenous Canadians during the time of British colonization.

In 2016, Fee published Tekahionwake: E. Pauline Johnson's writings on native North America, which detailed the life of the early North American Indigenous poet and fiction writer. The following year, Fee was elected a Fellow of the Royal Society of Canada for her research in Canadian literature and Canadian English lexicography.

== Publications ==
The following is a list of publications:

- Edited with Jean Barman. On the Cusp of Contact: Gender, Space, and Race in the Colonization of British Columbia: Essays by Jean Barman. Harbour, 2020. ISBN 9781550178968
- Polar Bear. Reaktion, 2019. ISBN 9781789141771
- Associate editor with Stefan Dollinger (chief editor). DCHP-2: The Dictionary of Canadianisms on Historical Principles', Second Online Edition. March 2017. www.dchp.ca/dchp2
- Edited with Dory Nason. Tekahionwake: E. Pauline Johnson's writings on native North America. Broadview, 2016. ISBN 9781554811915
- Literary land claims: the "Indian land question" from Pontiac's war to Attawapiskat Wilfrid Laurier UP, 2015. ISBN 9781771121194
- Written With Janice McAlpine. Guide to Canadian English usage: the essential English resource for Canadian writers & editors. Oxford UP, 1997. Second edition, 2007. New issue, 2011. ISBN 9780195445930
- The Fat Lady Dances: Margaret Atwood's "Lady Oracle". ECW Press, 1993. ISBN 9781550221367
- Silence made visible: Howard O'Hagan and Tay John. ECW Press, 1992. ISBN 9781550221671
- Canadian poetry in selected English-language anthologies: an index and guide (1985)
