= Desert Hearts =

1985 film by Donna Deitch

- Theatrical release poster
- Directed by: Donna Deitch
- Screenplay by: Natalie Cooper
- Based on: Desert of the Heart by Jane Rule
- Produced by: Donna Deitch
- Starring: Helen Shaver; Patricia Charbonneau; Audra Lindley
- Cinematography: Robert Elswit
- Edited by: Robert Estrin
- Production company: Desert Hearts Productions
- Distributed by: The Samuel Goldwyn Company
- Release dates: August 1985 (Locarno Film Festival); March 7, 1986 (United States)
- Running time: 96 minutes
- Country: United States
- Language: English
- Budget: $1.5 million
- Box office: $2.5 million

Desert Hearts is a 1985 American romantic drama film produced and directed by Donna Deitch. The screenplay, written by Natalie Cooper, is an adaptation of the 1964 lesbian novel Desert of the Heart by Jane Rule. Set in Reno, Nevada, in 1959, it tells the story of a university professor awaiting a divorce who finds her true self through a relationship with another, more self-confident woman. The film stars Helen Shaver and Patricia Charbonneau with a supporting performance by Audra Lindley.

Desert Hearts was released theatrically in the United States on March 7, 1986, and in the United Kingdom on June 6, 1986. It is regarded as the first feature film to "de-sensationalize lesbianism" by presenting a positive portrayal of a lesbian romance.

== Plot ==
In 1959, Vivian Bell, a 35-year-old English professor at Columbia University in New York City, travels to Reno to establish residency in Nevada (a process that takes six weeks), in order to obtain a quick divorce. She stays at a guest house ranch for women who are waiting for their divorces to be finalized. The ranch is owned by Frances Parker.

Soon after her arrival in Reno, Vivian meets Cay Rivvers, a young, free-spirited sculptor. Frances was the longtime mistress of Cay's late father, Glenn, and raised Cay after her biological mother (Glenn's wife) abandoned her. Cay is employed as a change operator at a casino in Reno, and is ending a relationship with Darrell, her controlling boss, saying that she was "attracted to his attraction" to her. When Vivian arrives, Cay takes an immediate interest in her; the proper, elegant Vivian is taken aback by Cay's lack of concern for what others think of her, as Cay has had relationships with women in the past. Frances, dismayed by Cay's lesbianism but frightened by the possibility of Cay leaving her alone, becomes resentful as Cay and Vivian grow closer.

After they attend an engagement party for Silver, Cay's best friend and co-worker, Cay takes a mildly inebriated Vivian to see Pyramid Lake at dawn and kisses her. Vivian returns the kiss passionately, but then becomes apprehensive and asks Cay to take her home. When they return to the ranch early the next morning, Frances angrily kicks Vivian out and accuses her of seducing Cay. Deeply hurt, Cay leaves the ranch immediately as Vivian transfers to a hotel near the casino for the rest of her stay.

Later, Cay arrives at Vivian's hotel room, where they initially clash but ultimately have sex after Cay removes her clothes and invites Vivian to bed. With the impending finalization of Vivian's divorce, the two struggle with the future of their relationship. At Silver's wedding, Cay attempts to reconcile with Frances, stating that Vivian "just reached in and put a string of lights around my heart", directly quoting Frances's own description of how she fell in love with Glenn.

After Vivian's divorce has become finalized, she packs up and boards a train to return to New York City. Cay still refuses to commit to leaving Nevada, but boards the train at the last minute as it begins to move away, agreeing to accompany Vivian until they reach the next station.

== Cast ==
- Helen Shaver as Vivian Bell
- Patricia Charbonneau as Cay Rivvers
- Audra Lindley as Frances Parker
- Andra Akers as Silver
- Gwen Welles as Gwen
- Dean Butler as Darrell
- James Staley as Art Warner
- Katie La Bourdette as Lucille
- Alex McArthur as Walter
- Tyler Tyhurst as Buck
- Denise Crosby as Pat
- Antony Ponzini as Joe

== Development and production ==
Desert Hearts is loosely based on the 1964 romance novel Desert of the Heart by Jane Rule. (Note: The novel's story mirrored Rule's life, as she met and fell in love with an older married woman, Helen Sonthoff, a creative writing and literature teacher at Concord Academy in Massachusetts.) In 1979, Donna Deitch was searching for a story about a lesbian romance that "was mainstream, not in the context of the women's community or (New York's) the Village." The first draft of the screenplay, written by Deitch, followed the original story, but when Natalie Cooper was hired as the screenwriter she veered away from it. The names of the main characters were changed: Evelyn Hall became Vivian Bell and Ann Childs became Cay Rivers. Other characters were minimized or excluded, subplots were eliminated, and the love scene was made explicit. Jane Rule described the film as "beautifully simplified".

Deitch raised the $1.5 million needed for the production budget with a $20,000 grant from the National Endowment for the Arts and sales of $15,000 shares to stock brokers and individual investors. The largest group of investors were lesbian and feminist women in several cities of the U.S., and the largest single investor was a gay man. She gave fundraising parties and published a regular newsletter to keep investors informed about the project's development. Raising funds took almost four years. It has been falsely reported that she had to sell her house to complete the film. In a 1991 interview with The Guardian, Deitch said that: "In San Francisco I sold it as politics. In New York as Art. In LA I convinced them it would be a box office hit." It took nearly six years for Deitch to bring Desert Hearts to theater screens.

Deitch encountered difficulty finding actresses who would portray lesbians without reserve with many refusing to audition for the film. Patricia Charbonneau was the first actress to be cast and went to Los Angeles with Deitch so she could audition with those reading for the role of Vivian Bell. Deitch noticed the chemistry between Charbonneau and Helen Shaver immediately. She persuaded actors to work for scale, and after casting completed, the film was shot on location in Reno in 31 days. Limited funds often necessitated filming two scenes in one day, with little room for retakes. Renting space in a real casino was out of the question and a dressed set in a room of an abandoned hotel served as the gambling casino in the film. (Note: Deitch makes a cameo appearance as the "Hungarian Gambler" playing two slot machines at a time in the casino. She says to Vivian Bell: "If you don't play, you can't win.")

Desert Hearts was Patricia Charbonneau's film debut. The contract with Charbonneau and Shaver obligated them to perform the sex scene in the hotel room without body doubles and to be nude on camera from the waist up. (Note: Charbonneau discovered two days before filming began that she was pregnant, although it mostly didn't show since the shoot took 31 days.) The scene was shot on the second-to-last day of filming, with cinematographer Robert Elswit and a boom operator as the only crew members present. The Samuel Goldwyn Company insisted in having the scene cut down but Deitch refused. (Note: When The L Word began production, producer Rose Troche had the cast and crew of the television series view the love scene in Desert Hearts to show them what a well-made lesbian sex scene should be like.) In a 1986 Los Angeles Times interview, Helen Shaver described it as being "profoundly intimate".

Deitch became the first lesbian director to have a sex scene between women seen by general movie theater audiences. She was surprised to learn 20 years after the film's release that Helen Shaver (Note: Helen Shaver said in a 2017 interview that she had "never, ever ... worked with a woman as a director until Donna Deitch.") and Patricia Charbonneau were told by their friends and agents that the film would ruin their careers. (Note: In a separate interview, Charbonneau said, "When I first read it, I thought, 'Well, everything that I've done so far people have taken a risk with me. I wanted to do something that at least people would talk about. Even if they hated it, they'd be talking about it." Commenting on doing such an explicit love scene, Charbonneau said, "Kissing Helen wasn't the hard part, really. The hard part was just walking out on the set naked and just standing there.") (Note: Charbonneau learned that model Gia Carangi patterned herself after Cay's character.)

In a 1986 Globe and Mail interview, Shaver said that she was being considered for a role in Joshua Then and Now, which would have promoted her career much farther than Desert Hearts. Donna Deitch assured her over the phone that she was right for her movie and told her she refused to hang up the phone until she got an answer. After five minutes, Shaver accepted the role. Shaver explained her feelings about the film. "I was scared, not about the lesbianism — the script said, 'The passion builds' in the love scene, so once I knew how the passion built and where the camera would be, that was fine — but because someone wanted me to do what I'd wanted to do all along, and here it was, and all I had to do was say yes. I had always wanted to carry a movie. Now, if I never make another one, I've done this. For the first time, I feel I've done a complete work on film." (Note: Helen Shaver met her husband, key grip Steve Smith, during production. They married in 1988.) (Note: In 2016, Helen Shaver revealed that screen legend Greta Garbo was so impressed with her performance in the film that they attempted to meet but due to Garbo's poor health instead talked over the phone.)

An original 35 mm print of Desert Hearts was donated to the Outfest UCLA Legacy Project for LGBT Film Preservation at the UCLA Film & Television Archive. In celebration of its 30th anniversary, Deitch's personal 35 mm print was screened at The Museum of Modern Art in December 2016.

Desert Hearts was digitally restored by the UCLA Film & Television Archive and the Criterion Collection/Janus Films in conjunction with the Outfest UCLA Legacy Project and the Sundance Institute.

In April 2016, Donna Deitch announced that she was fundraising to produce a sequel to Desert Hearts, to be set in New York City during the women's liberation movement.

== Release ==
Theatrical poster for 2017 release of 4K restoration

Desert Hearts made its North American debut at the 1985 Telluride Film Festival in September 1985. It had its world premiere at the 1985 Toronto International Film Festival in September 1985. The film screened at the 1985 Chicago International Film Festival on November 15, 1985, and the 1986 Sundance Film Festival in January 1986. Desert Hearts was the only lesbian film out of nine films selected for screening at the first London Lesbian and Gay Film Festival in 1986.

It was wide released in the United States by The Samuel Goldwyn Company on March 7, 1986, and in the United Kingdom by Mainline Pictures Ltd. on June 6, 1986.

The 4K restoration made its debut at the 2017 Sundance Film Festival on January 24, 2017, followed by a Q&A with director Donna Deitch, cinematographer Robert Elswit, and production designer Jeannine Oppewall. It was screened in Los Angeles by the UCLA Film & Television Archive on February 4, 2017; and in San Francisco at the Frameline Film Festival on June 18, 2017. The new digital version was released in theaters by Janus Films in July 2017.

=== Home media ===
The VHS of Desert Hearts was released by Vestron Video in the United States in December 1986, and in the United Kingdom by Vestron Video International on April 3, 1987. The DVD was released by MGM Home Entertainment in Region 1 on January 23, 2001.

A two-disc "Vintage Collection" special edition DVD for Region 1 was released by Wolfe Video on June 5, 2007. The DVD's extra features included original theatrical trailer, previously unseen footage of the love scene, slide show of production photographs, a commentary by Donna Deitch and interviews she conducted with Helen Shaver and Patricia Charbonneau.

The digitally restored version was released in Blu-ray and DVD by The Criterion Collection on November 14, 2017; featuring new interviews with Helen Shaver and Patricia Charbonneau, an excerpt from a 1995 documentary about Jane Rule, (Note: Fiction and Other Truths: A Film about Jane Rule by Lynne Fernie and Aerlyn Weissman.) an essay by film critic B. Ruby Rich, conversations between Donna Deitch and film crew plus Jane Lynch, and the audio commentary by Deitch included in the 2007 release by Wolfe Video.

== Critical reception ==
The reaction by film critics was mixed. In his scathing review for The New York Times, Vincent Canby criticized the screenplay as "unimaginative", described its characters as having "so little life", and the film as lacking a "voice or style of its own", but did add that it "is so earnest and sincere that it deserves an A for deportment". In comparison, Gene Siskel of the Chicago Tribune gave the film 3-1/2 stars out of 4 and wrote that it was "elegant, traditional story-telling" with "complete characterizations and performances, a genuinely tender and erotic love scene and a sweetly satisfying finale"; adding "the filmmaking and performances are so seamless that "Desert Hearts" may accomplish on film what hasn't been achieved in society—the de-sensationalizing of lesbianism."

In the review for The Body Politic, Ed Jackson said the screenplay was "spiked with hilarious one-liners", described the love scene as "a luminous study in gentle eroticism, almost painfully intimate", and the film as "a treat that is both soft-centred and sugar-coated", "handsome, well-constructed", and "much more dense than the simple propaganda that it might at first resemble." Michael Musto wrote in the Saturday Review that "Lesbianism isn't exploited for angst a la Children's Hour, or touched upon then summarily dropped as in Personal Best; it's handled tenderly and optimistically, if not with a lot of levity and wit." Paul Attanasio of The Washington Post praised the film highly, calling it "astonishingly polished and nuanced"; and although some aspects of the cinematography were criticized, remarked "Donna Deitch's first feature, touches something about love that few movies even hint at — not the tremulousness, or the hiding and jousting (although there is that), but the way the attraction of two lovers warps the world around them, throws it out of whack." In the Los Angeles Times, Sheila Benson wrote that although it was not "easy to sympathize with her character", Charbonneau was a "magnetic presence" and both she and Audra Lindley gave "crackerjack performances"; stating "although you can feel the budget limitations with every truncated scene, it's clear that Deitch is adept with actors and with the camera". In the Chicago Sun-Times, Roger Ebert gave Desert Hearts two and a half stars for the simplicity and directness of the film, but noted the surprising power of the romantic scenes. In City Limits, Amanda Lipman wrote that it was "a passionate, lovingly shot romance" and that "one of the most important differences between [Desert Hearts] and most heterosexual romances is the equality with which it treats each of its central characters." Geoff Brown in The Times praised the film wholeheartedly, including both actors in the leading roles, writing "Fuelled by vibrant performances and an expert script that articulates feelings without ascending into wordy clouds, Desert Hearts rises far above such pigeon-hole categories as the nostalgic period drama or the lesbian love-story. Deitch's film is a passionate, beautifully controlled drama about making choices and exercising the heart: in a word, about living."

In his critical study about homosexuality in the movies, The Celluloid Closet: Homosexuality in the Movies, film historian Vito Russo wrote: "Desert Hearts is a love story that recreates with perceptiveness and tenderness what it might have been like for two women of different generations and backgrounds to fall in love in the Fifties....Deitch's refusal to feature the straight world's reaction to lesbianism as the focus of her film made all the difference in the way the relationship between the women was perceived by audiences." He remarked about Vincent Canby's review of the film: "In the New York Times, Vincent Canby complained that we are not given enough information about the quality of Vivian's broken marriage, asking if perhaps her lesbianism was a hysterical reaction to her divorce. This is the point at which many heterosexual critics disqualify themselves from perceptively reviewing gay films."

On review aggregator Rotten Tomatoes, Desert Hearts has a 77% approval rating based on 92 reviews. On Metacritic, the film holds a score of 67 out of 100, based on 12 film critic reviews, indicating "generally favorable" reviews.

=== Reevaluation ===
With the passage of time, Desert Hearts has gained recognition for its quality and impact on lesbian cinema. In 1996, The Sydney Morning Herald declared, "Donna Deitch's 1985 Desert Hearts is widely regarded as one of the best and most significant mainstream fiction films about lesbians." The Globe and Mail referred to it as "one of the first and most highly regarded works in which a lesbian relationship is depicted favourably."

The Lesbian Film Guide states: "It is no exaggeration to say that in 1985 Desert Hearts was the film many lesbians had waited for all their lives. For the first time in cinema history here was a movie which was an unashamedly romantic lesbian love story, aimed primarily at a lesbian audience."

PlanetOut defined it as "One of the seminal lesbian/gay films of the 1980s, and arguably the most romantic lesbian film of all time"; and "historically important because it was the first lesbian-themed feature film written and directed by a woman." In 2002, Desert Hearts was a nominee in the American Film Institute list of greatest love stories in film in 100 years. In 2013, The Guardian named Desert Hearts one of the ten most romantic films and characterized the final scene of Vivian and Cay at the train station as "a subversive take on Hollywood endings." Curve described Desert Hearts as "possibly the first feature film with fully-rounded female characters who are attracted to each other without that attraction being contested by a male."

In 2007, Outfest named Desert Hearts one of the "25 Films That Changed Our Lives." It was one of "The 25 Most Important LGBT Films" in a 2014 IndieWire reader's poll. In 2017, Autostraddle ranked it at 25 of the best 102 lesbian movies of all time. In 2020, The A.V. Club named Desert Hearts one of the 50 most important American independent films.

== Audience reception ==
Lesbian literary critic Camille Paglia praised the film for its "riveting performances", having seen it 11 times in theaters. She claimed that Patricia Charbonneau's "magic" came from hormonal glow, as she had found out she was pregnant before shooting began. In her book Sexual Personae (1990), Paglia wrote: "The closest thing I have ever seen to Shakespeare's Rosalind is Patricia Charbonneau's spirited performance as a coltish Reno cowgirl in Donna Deitch's film Desert Hearts."

Actress Jane Lynch said she had never "seen in celluloid such real passion and desire between two women" and had watched the video "over 50 times." C.J. Prince, author and executive director of North Jersey Pride, wrote in 2014 that Desert Hearts "was refreshingly different, not only because the characters weren't psychotic, but also because it didn't end in depressing, unrequited love...or death", adding "the film holds up as a bold, beautifully rendered story about the search for authenticity and love, and the sacrifices one has to make to find them...For a coming-out movie, it's as good as it gets."

In an assessment of lesbian genre films since the 1980s, Slate said the film was "immensely popular with lesbian audiences" and earned "cult classic status...years after it was released."

== Box office ==
By the fall of 1986, Desert Hearts had grossed $2.5 million in the United States and Canada. The revenue from its rental by independent distribution companies was $1.1 million.

== Accolades ==
List of accolades
Award / Film Festival	Date	Category	Recipient(s)	Result	Ref.
Independent Spirit Awards	1987	Best Female Lead	Patricia Charbonneau	Nominated	
Locarno International Film Festival	1985	Bronze Leopard	Helen Shaver	Won	
Sundance Film Festival	1986	Grand Jury Prize – Dramatic	Desert Hearts	Nominated	
Sundance Film Festival	1986	Special Jury Prize – Dramatic	Desert Hearts	Won	

== Soundtrack ==
In the director's commentary bonus feature of the special edition DVD released by Wolfe Video, Donna Deitch said that approximately 20% of her budget went to obtaining the rights to the original music in the film. Deitch asked the Goldwyn Company to extend the rights to the music to release a soundtrack on album or compact cassette, but the studio declined.

=== Track listing ===
The music for Desert Hearts was supervised by Terri Fricon and Gay Jones.

Desert Hearts (Soundtrack)
No.	Title	Writer(s)	Performers	Length
1.	"Leavin' on Your Mind"	Wayne Walker, Webb Pierce	Patsy Cline	n/a
2.	"Rave On"	Bill Tilghman, Sonny West, Norman Petty	Buddy Holly	n/a
3.	"Amigo's Guitar"	Kitty Wells, Roy Bodkin, John D. Loudermilk	Kitty Wells	n/a
4.	"Get Rhythm"	Johnny Cash	Johnny Cash	n/a
5.	"Blue Moon"	Richard Rodgers, Lorenz Hart	Elvis Presley	n/a
6.	"Be-Bop-A-Lula"	Gene Vincent, Donald Graves, Bill "Sheriff Tex" Davis	Gene Vincent	n/a
7.	"'March' from the Suite For Three Oranges"	Sergei Prokofiev	(Note: "Courtesy of Everest Records" appears in the credits but the artist is not identified. In the 1961 Everest Records Catalog of classic Long-Playing albums, under Everest Classical Collections, "Prokofiev—March from Love For Three Oranges" appears in album PIANO VIRTUOSO, ROBERT ALEXANDER BOHNKE (catalog Nos. 6071 / 3071).)	n/a
8.	"Wondering"	Joe Werner	Webb Pierce	n/a
9.	"Crazy"	Willie Nelson	Patsy Cline	n/a
10.	"When My Blue Moon Turns to Gold Again"	Wiley Walker, Gene Sullivan	Elvis Presley	n/a
11.	"Honky-Tonk Man"	Johnny Horton, Tillman Franks, Howard Hausey	Johnny Horton	n/a
12.	"Gone"	Smokey Rogers	Ferlin Husky	n/a
13.	"He'll Have to Go"	Joe Allison, Audrey Allison	Jim Reeves	n/a
14.	"Treasure of Love"	Lou Stallman, Jim Shapiro	Clyde McPhatter	n/a
15.	"Old Cape Cod"	Claire Rothrock, Milton Yakus, Allan Jeffrey	Patti Page	n/a
16.	"It Wasn't God Who Made Honky Tonk Angels"	J.D. Miller	Kitty Wells	n/a
17.	"Cry"	Churchill Kohlman	Johnnie Ray	n/a
18.	"I Wished on the Moon"	Ralph Rainger, Dorothy Parker	Ella Fitzgerald	n/a
19.	"Lookin' For Someone To Love"	Steve Ferguson	Andra Akers	n/a
Total length:				n/a

== See also ==
- List of feature films with lesbian characters
- List of LGBTQ-related films of 1985
- List of LGBTQ-related films by storyline
- Another Way, award-winning 1982 lesbian romance film, set in Hungary in the 1950s
- Carol, Oscar-nominated 2015 lesbian romance film directed by Todd Haynes, set in the 1950s
- Tell It to the Bees, 2018 lesbian romance film, set in Scotland in the 1950s
- The World Unseen, 2007 lesbian romance film, set in South Africa in the 1950s
