= United States (TV series) =

- Genre: Comedy drama
- Created by: Gary Markowitz
- Written by: Gary Markowitz; Larry Gelbart; Tom Whedon; Everett Greenbaum; Carol Gary
- Directed by: Will Mackenzie; Nick Havinga
- Starring: Beau Bridges; Helen Shaver; Rossie Harris; Justin Dana
- Composer: Jack Elliott
- Country of origin: United States
- Original language: English
- No. of seasons: 1
- No. of episodes: 13 (4 unaired)

Production
- Executive producer: Larry Gelbart
- Camera setup: Single-camera
- Running time: 30 minutes
- Production company: OTP Productions

Original release
- Network: NBC
- Release: March 11 – April 29, 1980

United States is an American comedy-drama series that aired on NBC from March 11 until April 29, 1980.

Larry Gelbart, the show's executive producer and chief writer, said the name United States was not a reference to the country but rather to "the state of being united in a relationship". Gelbart envisioned a series that would be "a situation comedy based on the real things that happen in my marriage and in the marriages of my friends".

Episodes tackled such topics as marital infidelity, household debt, friends who drink too much, death within the family, and sexual misunderstandings.

United States focused on Richard and Libby Chapin, an upwardly mobile couple who lived in a Los Angeles suburb, Woodland Hills. Beau Bridges played Richard, and Helen Shaver played Libby. Gelbart reverted to black-and-white script for the show's titles. He said that was to convey the mood of "a sophisticated '30s film." Gelbart also avoided use of background music and a laugh track. Scripts featured dialogue such as, "Just for once I'd like to be treated like a friend instead of a husband," and "Maybe you and Bob can go out and get yourselves one redhead with two straws."

United States premiered at 10:30 p.m. on March 11, 1980. NBC pulled it from the schedule within two months, after only nine of 13 episodes had aired. The series aired later that year in Britain on BBC2, under the title Married. The remaining episodes were not broadcast in the US until 1986, when the A&E cable channel aired United States.

The show's tagline made by NBC was "It will do to marriages what M*A*S*H did for war".

== Cast ==
- Beau Bridges - Richard Chapin
- Helen Shaver - Libby Chapin
- Rossie Harris - Dylan Chapin
- Justin Dana - Nicky Chapin

== Episodes ==
| No. | Title | Directed by | Written by | Original release date |
|---|---|---|---|---|
| 1 | "Uncle Charlie" | Unknown | Unknown | March 11, 1980 |
When Uncle Charlie dies, the Chapins have to figure out how to explain it to their sons.
| 2 | "Broccoli" | Unknown | Unknown | March 18, 1980 |
The Chapins' dinner party with another couple turns into a disaster when the main topic of conversation becomes the husband's infidelity.
| 3 | "Josh" | Unknown | Unknown | March 25, 1980 |
An old friend for the past 30 years suddenly reveals to the Chapins that he has been hiding his homosexuality all that time.
| 4 | "And Baby Makes Two..." | Unknown | Unknown | April 1, 1980 |
The Chapins panic when they think that Libby is pregnant.
| 5 | "All Our Weapons" | Unknown | Unknown | April 8, 1980 |
Richard and Libby have a fight over his refusal to ask her father for a loan.
| 6 | "Windmills" | Unknown | Unknown | April 15, 1980 |
Libby's ex-husband makes a surprise visit to the Chapin home.
| 7 | "Sometimes" | Unknown | Unknown | April 22, 1980 |
Sometimes it's like this, he's wrong.
| 8 | "Better Than Burning" | Unknown | Unknown | April 29, 1980 |
Richard and Libby separately reveal their thoughts to interviewers for a book survey.
| 9 | "Touching Story" | Unknown | Unknown | Unaired |
Libby finally confesses a shocking childhood secret.
| 10 | "Slide Area" | Unknown | Unknown | Unaired |
A severe storm causes their friends to have to stay over because their house is about to slide away. Richard questions his emotions when he cries for no apparent reason.
| 11 | "Room Service" | Unknown | Unknown | Unaired |
Staying in a motel after a fight with his wife, Richard is tempted to stray when a female friend visits to console him.
| 12 | "Lysdexia Is No Joek" | Unknown | Unknown | Unaired |
When Nicky's teacher comes to talk to them about his difficulties learning how to read, Libby feels pangs of guilt that her son seems to be inheriting her learning disability.
| 13 | "The Grand Funk" | Unknown | Unknown | Unaired |
An already depressed Richard becomes even more so when Libby tells him that their son Nicky is part of a gang of kids who are going around killing cats.

== Reception ==
Writing in The Toronto Star, entertainment critic Ron Base (reviewing the first episode) felt the program lacked insight, and wrote that the program's emphasis on talk and arguments made Bridges and Shaver "surprisingly unlikable".

In their The Complete Directory to Prime Time Network and Cable TV Shows 1946–Present, authors Tim Brooks and Earle Marsh characterize the show as "tedious, boring and didactic".

== Bilbliography ==
- Lurie, Alison. (1980, April 26-May 2). Are We Ready For Marriage—1980s-Style ... With No Sugar Added? TV Guide, pp. 4–8
