= Shakedown (1988 film) =

1988 film by James Glickenhaus

- Theatrical release poster
- Directed by: James Glickenhaus
- Written by: James Glickenhaus
- Produced by: J. Boyce Harman Jr.
- Starring: Peter Weller; Sam Elliott; Patricia Charbonneau; Antonio Fargas; Blanche Baker
- Cinematography: John Lindley
- Edited by: Paul Fried
- Music by: Jonathan Elias
- Production company: Shapiro-Glickenhaus Entertainment
- Distributed by: Universal Pictures
- Release date: May 6, 1988
- Running time: 97 minutes
- Country: United States
- Language: English
- Budget: $6 million
- Box office: $10.1 million

Shakedown (also known in international markets as Blue Jean Cop) is a 1988 American crime action film written and directed by James Glickenhaus, starring Peter Weller and Sam Elliott. The plot concerns an idealistic lawyer (Weller) who teams with a veteran cop (Elliott) to uncover a possible police corruption scandal.

The film was released by Universal Pictures on May 6, 1988. It received generally positive reviews and was a commercial success.

== Plot ==
Roland Dalton is a burned-out, mild-mannered Manhattan public defender, and his last case before leaving legal aid is crack dealer Michael Jones, accused of shooting to death police officer Patrick O'Leary in Central Park. According to Jones, the shooting was in self-defense and Officer O'Leary was a "Blue Jean Cop" (an opportunistic police officer who robs drug dealers).

Being a creature of habit, Dalton seeks the truth to his mysterious case and looks to Richie Marks, a renegade loner NYPD narcotics detective. Dalton realizes the prosecutor in his last case is a former love interest, the smart and sexy Susan Cantrell. Throughout the trial, Roland rekindles this former affair with Susan unbeknownst to his fiancée Gail.

Roland and Marks eventually learn that O'Leary was working with a large number of dirty cops, and purchased designer blue jeans and an expensive car. The dirty cops were working with drug lord Nicky Carr. Roland at one point breaks into the police station's evidence locker to locate the cassette tape that Jones had in a boom box radio at the time of his shooting. The tape recorded the entire incident, and when Roland attempts to get the tape, he is taken hostage by Detective Rydel and other dirty cops. Rydel goes to create a distraction so the others can kill Roland, but Marks bursts in and kills the cops.

Although Roland makes it to court with the assistance of an insane cab driver, the judge refuses to allow the tape into evidence. After making an impassioned closing statement, the jury acquits Jones of the shooting. Marks then shows up in a Porsche purchased by O'Leary and they rush to LaGuardia Airport to hunt down Carr and Rydel, who are fleeing the country. Richie jumps onto their plane's landing gear and after shooting out an engine and tossing a hand grenade into the landing gear compartment, he jumps into the East River before the plane explodes.

Roland stays working as a public defender. He has broken up with Gail and is once again dating Susan.

== Cast ==
- Peter Weller as Roland Dalton
- Sam Elliott as Detective Richie Marks
- Patricia Charbonneau as Susan Cantrell
- Antonio Fargas as Nicky Carr
- Jude Ciccolella as Patrick O'Leary
- William Prince as Mr. Feinberger
- Larry Joshua as Detective Rydel
- John C. McGinley as Sean Phillips (credited as John McGinley)
- Richard Brooks as Michael Jones
- Thomas G. Waites as Officer Kelly (credited as Tom Waites)
- John Finn as The Bartender
- Augusta Dabney as Judge Maynard
- Blanche Baker as Gail Feinberger

== Production ==
The working title of the film was Blue Jean Cop, which was still used in some international markets. Filming took place on-location in New York City.

== Reception ==
=== Critical response ===
On the review aggregator website Rotten Tomatoes, 70% of 10 critics' reviews are positive, with an average rating of 6.6/10.

Roger Ebert at the Chicago Sun-Times commended Glickenhaus for showing a "tremendous amount of craftsmanship and skill" when sacrificing story to direct his action scenes and gave praise to both Weller and Elliott for being "strong, unsubtle but convincing" in their respective roles, saying "It's an assembly of sensational moments, strung together by a plot that provides the excuses for amazing stunts, and not much else." Gene Siskel of the Chicago Tribune called the film "a rollicking, thrilling and funny police picture", praising Glickenhaus' direction for containing a "mixture of reality and way-out thrills" in the action sequences, saying that "Shakedown moves with intelligence, speed and joy in everything from writing to stunt work. A picture this much fun can keep a movie lover happy for a week." Kevin Thomas from the Los Angeles Times felt that Elliott lacked equal screen time alongside Weller for his character to remain in the viewer's mind, but he also praised Glickenhaus for keeping the film "terse, fast-moving and atmospheric" throughout the plot and into the action set pieces, calling it "mindlessly enjoyable escapist fare".

=== Box office ===
In the United States and Canada, Shakedown grossed $10.1 million at the box office.
