= Deanna Reder =

Canadian professor of English

- Born: Brandon, Manitoba, Canada

Academic background
- Education: BA, 1990, Concordia University; MA, 1994, York University; PhD., 2007, University of British Columbia
- Thesis: Âcimisowin as theoretical practice: autobiography as Indigenous intellectual tradition in Canada (2007)
- Academic advisors: Margery Fee; Jo-Ann Archibald

Academic work
- Institutions: Simon Fraser University

Deanna Helen Reder is a Cree-Métis professor of English and Indigenous Studies at Simon Fraser University. Reder was elected a member of the College of New Scholars of the Royal Society of Canada in 2018. As a faculty member at Simon Fraser University, she was a founding member of the Indigenous Literary Studies Association (ILSA) and served on the council from 2015 to 2018. In 2019 she helped establish the Indigenous Editors Association (IEA) and served as its "Past-President" from 2020 to 2021.

== Early life and education ==
While Reder has family all over the Canadian prairies, her Cree speaking Cree and Métis family come from La Ronge, and historically from Île-à-la-Crosse and surrounding communities, including Lac Doré, Green Lake, and Sled Lake Saskatchewan. Her father was a corporal in the Canadian Armed Forces and the family lived on army bases until Reder was ten years old. Her parents did not graduate high school.

Reder says she began to understand the significance of autobiography when her mother read Halfbreed by Maria Campbell, and was excited to read a book that accurately represented her life. Growing up, Reder says that little Indigenous literature was taught in the school system, so that the only Indigenous author that she was assigned to read throughout her entire K-12 education was Pauline Johnson's poem "The Song my Paddle Sings."

While attending York University for her Masters of Arts, Reder wanted to focus on Indigenous literatures but found it difficult to find enough courses on the topic. She instead focused on nineteenth-century Canadian literature, noting that the focus was on settlers rather than Indigenous authors. After earning her MA, Reder took a break from her studies, returning in 2001 to begin her PhD, which she completed in 2007.

== Career ==
In 2007, Reder was hired as an assistant professor in the Department of English and the First Nations Studies Program at Simon Fraser University.

In 2010, Reder published Troubling Tricksters: Revisioning Critical Conversations with Linda M. Morra through Wilfrid Laurier University Press. Troubling Tricksters was an anthology of essays revolving around the trickster discourse in Indigenous literature.

In 2012, the First Nations Program at SFU was established as the Department of First Nations Studies at SFU. (In 2019 the department changed its name to The Department of Indigenous Studies.) The new department, which became effective in April 2012, included certificates in First Nations studies research and major, minor, and joint major with archaeology and linguistics. The following year, Reder was part of a council of Indigenous and settler scholars that founded the Indigenous Literary Studies Association (ILSA). As president of ILSA, she coordinated with Sam McKegney at Queen's, and with Sophie McCall at SFU and various other ILSA members, to organize the Indigenous Voices Awards in order to recognize emerging Indigenous authors in Canada.

In 2015, she became a Co-Investigator with Daniel Heath Justice and Margery Fee on a SSHRC-funded project called The People And The Text. The project aimed to collect literature by Indigenous authors that either never were published or had fallen out of print. A year later, Reder and Morra edited the anthology Learn, Teach, Challenge: Approaching Indigenous Literatures; the following year, Reder edited Read, Listen, Tell: Indigenous Stories from Turtle Island with Sophie McCall, David Gaertner, and Gabrielle L'Hirondelle Hill.

In 2018, Reder and Alix Shield published documents that had been omitted from Halfbreed in 1973, against the wishes of author Maria Campbell, by the book's editors, at the last moment before publication. The documents were Campbell's account of being raped by Royal Canadian Mounted Police officers as a youth. She was also elected a member of the College of New Scholars of the Royal Society of Canada.

She sits on the Board of Directors of the non-profit Federation for the Humanities and Social Sciences. In June 2019, Reder was part of the SFU Art Cluster that elected to remove the 1951 mural British Columbia Pageant, a piece of art by Charles Comfort that misrepresented Indigenous Peoples as passive and accepting of the colonization of British Columbia.

In 2023, Reder's monograph Autobiography as Indigenous Intellectual Tradition: Cree and Métis âcimisowina was awarded the Gabrielle-Roy Prize for her work on Indigenous literary criticism. Reder was later awarded a Canada Prize by the Federation for the Humanities and Social Sciences in 2024, where she notes how this monograph highlights Indigenous autobiography across various literary genres to break down a binary between Indigenous oral and European written cultures. The following year, Autobiography as Indigenous Intellectual Tradition was awarded the Modern Language Association (MLA) Prize for Studies in Native American Literatures, Cultures, and Languages.

== Publications ==
- Troubling Tricksters: Revisioning Critical Conversations (2010), edited with Linda M. Morra
- Learn, Teach, Challenge: Approaching Indigenous Literatures (2016), edited with Linda M. Morra
- Read, Listen, Tell: Indigenous Stories from Turtle Island (2017), edited with Lead Editor Sophie McCall, as well as David Gaertner and Gabrielle L'Hirondelle Hill
- Honouring the Strength of Indian Women: Plays, Stories, Poetry (2019), edited with Michelle Coupal, Joanne Arnott, and Emalene A. Manuel
- Cold Case North: The Search for James Brady and Absolom Halkett (2020), with Michael Nest and Eric Bell
- Autobiography as Indigenous Intellectual Tradition: Cree and Métis âcimisowina (2022)
- Elements of Indigenous Style: A Guide for Writing By and About Indigenous Peoples, second edition (2025), by Gregory Younging, edited with Lead Editor Warren Cariou, as well as Lorena Sekwan Fontaine and Jordan Abel
