= Call Me (film) =

1988 erotic thriller film

- Theatrical release poster
- Directed by: Sollace Mitchell
- Written by: Karyn Kay; Sollace Mitchell
- Produced by: Kenneth F. Martel
- Starring: Patricia Charbonneau; Stephen McHattie; Boyd Gaines; Sam Freed; Steve Buscemi
- Cinematography: Zoltán David
- Edited by: Paul Fried
- Music by: David Michael Frank
- Distributed by: Vestron Pictures
- Release date: May 20, 1988
- Running time: 96 minutes
- Country: United States
- Language: English
- Box office: $251,819 (USA)

Call Me is a 1988 American erotic thriller film about a woman who strikes up a relationship with a stranger over the phone, and in the process becomes entangled in a murder. The film was directed by Sollace Mitchell, and stars Patricia Charbonneau, Stephen McHattie, and Boyd Gaines.

== Plot ==
Anna, a young and energetic journalist, receives an obscene call from an unknown caller whom she mistakes for her boyfriend. As a result of this mistake she agrees to meet with the caller at a local bar. There she witnesses a murder in the women's bathroom. She finds herself drawn into a mystery involving both the killer and the mysterious caller with whom she shares increasingly personal conversations.

== Cast ==
- Patricia Charbonneau as Anna
- Stephen McHattie as "Jellybean"
- Boyd Gaines as Bill
- Sam Freed as Alex
- Steve Buscemi as "Switchblade"
- Patti D'Arbanville as Cori
- David Strathairn as Sam
- Olek Krupa as Hennyk
- John Seitz as "Pressure"
- Pi Douglass as Nikki
- George Gerdes as Fred
- Ernest Abuba as Boss
- Kevin Harris as Dude
- Gy Mirano as The Waitress

== Reception ==
In reviewing the film, The Pittsburgh Post-Gazette gave it a C+ calling it a "hot, hip thriller." The Baltimore Maryland Evening Sun gave it one star saying the film "tries but it is not one of your better fim noir tributes. It may be one of the worst."

The film was reviewed by the television show At the Movies, on May 28, 1988. Roger Ebert called the film a "directorial mess", citing laborious scenes which serve only to set up plot points, some of which are never followed up on. Gene Siskel felt the premise had potential, but it was ruined by the lead character's relentless stupidity, and that the film did not take the sexual elements far enough. The critics gave the film two thumbs down.
