= One Special Night =

- Based on: A Winter Visitor play by Jan Hartman
- Written by: Nancey Silvers
- Directed by: Roger Young
- Starring: James Garner; Julie Andrews
- Music by: Richard Bellis
- Country of origin: United States
- Original language: English

Production
- Executive producers: Jim Green; Allen Epstein; Mark Bacino
- Producer: Albert Salzer
- Cinematography: Guy Dufaux
- Editor: Ben Weissman
- Running time: 92 minutes
- Production company: Green/Epstein Productions

Original release
- Network: CBS
- Release: November 28, 1999

One Special Night is a 1999 American made-for-television drama film directed by Roger Young, adapted by Nancey Silvers from the play A Winter Visitor by Jan Hartman, and starring James Garner and Julie Andrews.

The plot involves two strangers, a construction contractor (Garner) and a Pediatric Cardiologist (Andrews), who take refuge in a small abandoned cabin during a stormy winter night and, despite their many differences, they become undeniably drawn to one another.

This was Garner's and Andrews' third film pairing as romantic leads, after The Americanization of Emily (1964) and Victor Victoria (1982).

== Plot ==
Contractor Robert Woodward visits his ill wife at a nursing home on Thanksgiving Day, while Dr. Catherine Howard, whose husband recently died, winds up at the same nursing home. They meet for the first time despite living within miles of each other for years.

Following an approaching blizzard, Catherine offers Robert a ride home when she learns that he is stranded. The pair gets off to a rocky start as she tries to maneuver the car through the storm and he barks instructions. The car careens off the road into a snow bank. So, Robert and Catherine must trek through the blizzard and take shelter in an empty cabin to wait out the storm.

The next morning, they are discovered by one of his daughters and her husband. who give Catherine a ride back to her home. On the following Sunday, Catherine drives to Murray's, a restaurant both she and Robert frequent. She orders his suggested chocolate chip pancakes and waits for him. Robert also drives to Murray's, but upon arriving receives a call informing him his wife has fallen ill again, so heads to the hospital.

Robert hosts the wake for his wife, who passed on that Sunday. Both of his daughters are there, with Lori sitting on the kitchen floor and crying. Her sister Jaclyn comes over and comforts her. Lori is eight months pregnant and has discovered her husband has been cheating.

Later, Catherine receives a phone call to let her know that a young woman is going into a troubled labor. She drives to the hospital only to find that Robert is the one who requested her. Indicating it is okay, she then heads in to see the daughter

Robert asks Catherine if she went to the diner that Sunday. Lying, she replies that she did not, that she had been too busy. Robert explains he was called away before he could go inside. Then she discovers that his wife died that day. At his SUV, Robert pulls out a box with a necklace inside, which turns out to be the necklace Catherine lost earlier, then shows her the scarf she had tied on the tree near where she lost it.

With Catherine having Christmas Day off, Robert takes her through the icy roads. His SUV gets stuck near the same place where they were stranded earlier. Robert and Catherine walk to the cabin, where they see smoke from the chimney. Robert breaks another window before letting Catherine in, and upon being questioned by her, Robert explains that he bought the cabin from the previous owners as an emergency vacation home, in case he get stranded again. Catherine and Robert kiss in the living room, ending the movie.

== Cast ==
- James Garner as Robert Woodward
- Julie Andrews as Catherine Howard
- Patricia Charbonneau as Lori
- Stacy Grant as Jaclyn Woodward
- Stewart Bick as Jeff
- Daniel Magder as Michael
- Sheena Larkin as Marybeth Woodward
- Kim Roberts as Nurse Sara
- Gary Plaxton as Dr. Michaels
- Belinda Hum as new hospice nurse
- Kerrilyn Keith as O.R. nurse (billed as Kerilyn Keith)
- Sasha Wentges as nursery nurse
- Annabelle Torsein as young hospice nurse
- Frank Cavallero as TV reporter
- Sam Stone as Murray

== Production ==
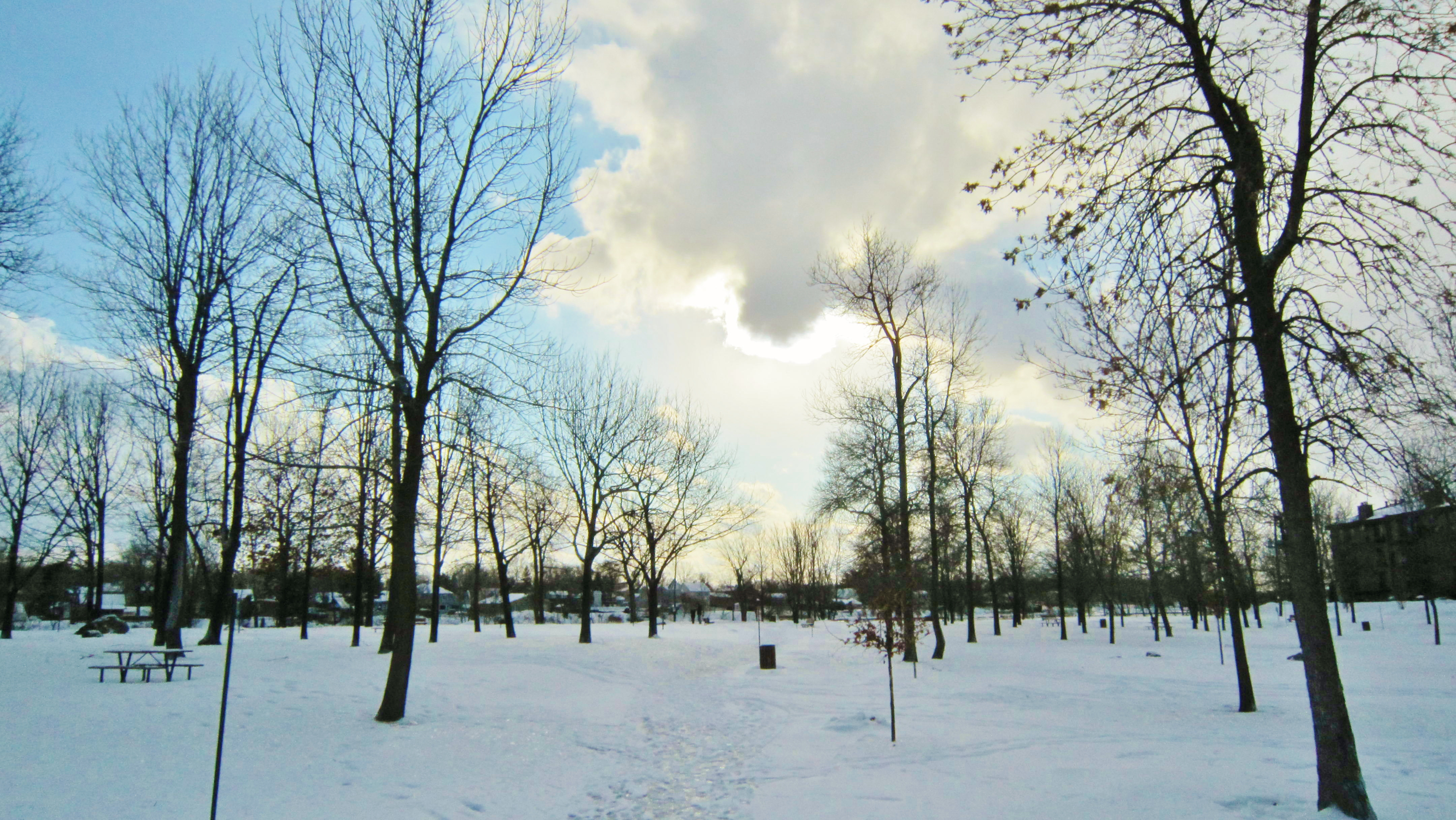
One Special Night was filmed in various locations throughout the Montreal area in Quebec.

One Special Night marked the third film pairing of longtime friends James Garner and Julie Andrews as romantic leads, after The Americanization of Emily (1964) and Victor Victoria (1982). It was Garner's 21st television movie, and his first since The Rockford Files: Shoot Out at the Gold Pagoda in 1997 as well as Andrews' first assignment since she underwent throat surgery after her stage comeback in the 1995 Broadway musical version of Victor/Victoria. Andrews's husband, veteran director Blake Edwards, was originally attached to direct the project but he eventually withdrew, citing a scheduling conflict. Director Roger Young took over from him.

Filming took place over five weeks in Montreal during the winter of 1998-1999. Shooting locations include off-island suburb Terrebonne and St. Mary's Hospital. Andrews was initially worried about working again after her surgery, especially since the filming location required her to work "in such cold, bone dry weather," which at times dipped to 29 degrees below zero. Although there was plenty of real snow, Garner mentioned that the wind was so strong at times that the filmmakers had to use some artificial snow to ensure it would show up on camera.

== Critical reception ==
John Leonard, writing for New York magazine, described One Special Night as "a trifle slower and more than a trifle thicker, but still game. Skip this at your own peril. Not for nothing do they play some Ella Fitzgerald [...] Nancy Silvers and Roger Young deliver, as screenwriter and director. They get us to the clinch we need. And if there isn’t a tear in our eye when we finally arrive, we should probably give up on ourselves." New York Times critic Ron Wertheimer found that the film "lives up to its title. These dependable performers can still generate enough sparks to warm two hours on Sunday night." He noted that "CBS has wisely found the stars a script about opposites attracting, one that subtly nudges memories of the pair's two movies, The Americanization of Emily in 1964 and Victor/Victoria in 1982. This film cannot stack up to those, and it doesn't try to. But it does offer a sweet tale of autumnal romance that your heart will believe." In a retrospective review for Entertainment Weekly, Marcus Jones wrote about the film: "A lesser-known project in Dame Julie Andrews' oeuvre, this TV movie still packs on the charm with her opposite James Garner as two strangers who take refuge in a cabin during bad winter weather and fall in love."

== Ratings ==
Broadcast on November 28, 1999, One Special Night drew one of the highest ratings for any television movie that was broadcast during the season, with an estimated 25.9 million viewers tuning in Sunday night. In April 2000, The Los Angeles Times reported that the film was the second-biggest made-for-TV movie of "that sweeps period." According to The New York Post, it would remain the top-rated scripted television movie until Darnell Martin's drama film Their Eyes Were Watching God, starring Halle Berry and released in 2005.

== Awards and nominations ==
Awarding body	Award	Nominee	Result	Ref.
Golden Reel Awards	Best Sound Editing – Television Movies and Specials (including Mini-Series)	Ed Kalnins	Nominated	
