= Linda Morra =

Canadian literature and studies scholar

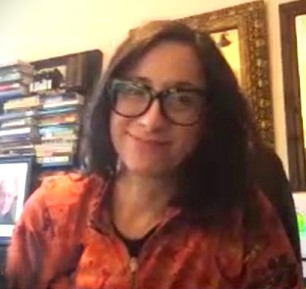
Morra in 2024

Linda M. Morra is a scholar of women's archives, affect theory, and women's writing in Canada. She holds a PhD from the University of Ottawa in Canadian literature and Canadian studies. She serves as a professor of English at Bishop's University, and was a John A. Sproul Research Fellow at the University of California, Berkeley where she joined the Canadian studies program for the spring 2016 semester. In 2022 she was awarded the Jack & Nancy Farley Distinguished Visiting Scholar position at Simon Fraser University. In 2008, while researching author Jane Rule after her death, Morra discovered Rule's unpublished autobiography, Taking My Life. She went on to edit and annotate this work, which was published in 2011.

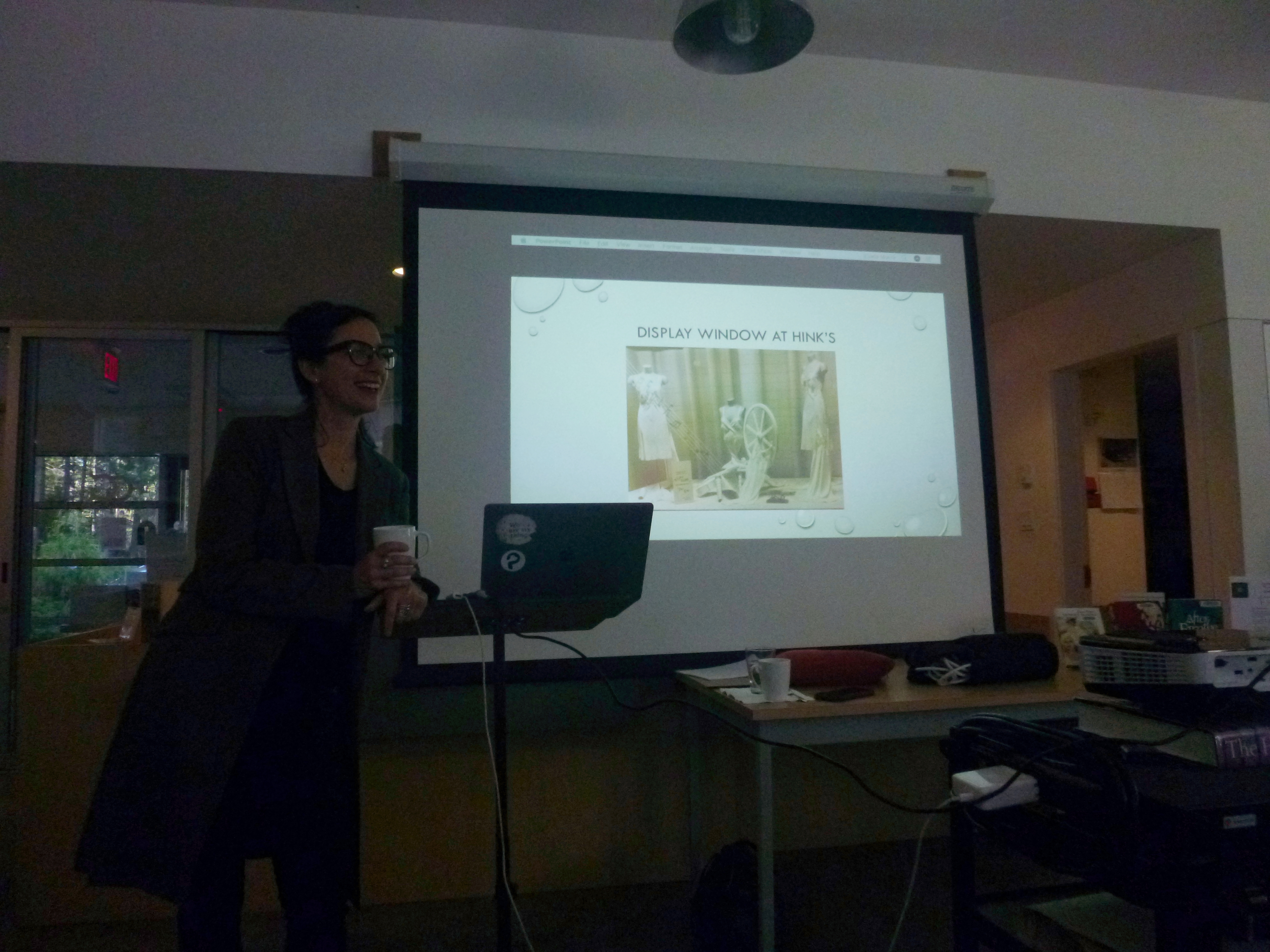
Morra speaks on Jane Rule at Galiano Library.

== Life ==
Morra holds a Ph.D. from the University of Ottawa in Canadian literature and Canadian studies. She currently lives in Montreal, Quebec. She was the President of the Quebec Writers' Federation between 2014 and 2016, and again between 2017 and 2018.

She is the host of the literary podcast, Getting Lit With Linda, which explores literature from Canada. The podcast won in the category of Outstanding Education Series by the Canadian Podcasting Awards in 2022, and appraised on RadioActive, a CBC radio program, in November 2022, by Karen Unland for the range of literature covered and for the "dulcet tones" of the host's voice. In 2024, her podcast won in the category of education for the Women in Podcasting Awards.

== Career ==
Morra is currently a professor of English at Bishop's University. She specializes in women's archives, affect theory, and women's writing in Canada. She served as the Craig Dobbin Chair of Canadian Studies at University College, Dublin, between 2016 and 2017. She was a John A. Sproul Research Fellow at the University of California, Berkeley where she joined the Canadian studies program for the spring 2016 semester. There, she focused on research about Jane Rule and her work. In 2022, she became the Jack and Nancy Farley Distinguished Visiting Scholar at Simon Fraser University, where she continued to research about Rule and explores Rule's influence on "the development of a West Coast Queer Community."

=== Notable works ===
In 2008, while researching author Jane Rule after her death, Morra discovered Rule's unpublished autobiography, Taking My Life. She went on to edit and annotate the work, which was published in 2011. M. A. C. Farrant writes in her review that Morra's introduction is "enlightening," and Katherine V. Forrest calls the book "fastidiously edited and annotated."

Morra and Jessica Schagerl edited the 2012 book Basements and Attics, Closets and Cyberspace: Explorations in Canadian Women's Archives. The work examines the processes of archivization and the ethical concerns around the archival research in relation to women's writing through "contemporary conversations" with scholars, archivists and artists. Lisa Sloniowski summarizes in Resources for Feminist Research, "Morra and Schagerl have created an impressive and admirable collection, which helps us identify feminist concerns in relation to contemporary women's archives, archives that have historically been dismissed and hard to find."

Her book Unarrested Archives: Case Studies in Twentieth-Century Canadian Women’s Authorship, published in 2014, was shortlisted for the Gabrielle Roy Prize in 2015. It explores the literary and personal archives of five Canadian women authors and through thorough case studies documents how they were "regulated and contained" throughout their lives. Jennifer Toews, writing in The Journal of the Association of Canadian Archivists notes that "Overall, Morra’s presentation of these five unique archives provides a thought‑provoking and broad history of the experience of Canadian women writers, their struggles to survive and overcome adversity and oppression of various kinds, and their participation in the creation and preservation of their lasting legacies through their archives." Shawn Brackett, in History of Intellectual Culture, writes "she does an excellent job of problematizing gender, race, and class, and weaves nuanced understandings throughout."

With Cree-Métis scholar, Dr. Deanna Reder, she collaborated on the anthology, Learn, Teach, Challenge: Approaching Indigenous Literatures. Published by Wilfrid Laurier Press in 2016, the book is now considered a foundational classroom text for the study of Indigenous literatures.

A 2018 release, Margaret Laurence and Jack McClelland: Letters, co-edited by Morra and Laura K. Davis, is an annotated volume of letters between author Margaret Laurence and publisher Jack McClelland. George Fetherling, in Quill and Quire, criticizes both the length of the book and the annotations, which he observes are "plentiful but peppered with errors." Jeffrey Aaron Weingarten agrees that the volume could have been pared down, but offers, "the volume, overall, is a vital contribution to Canadian letters and a touching tribute to two titans who guided the development of Canadian literature after 1960."

In 2020, she produced Moving Archives (WLUP 2020), which won the Gabrielle Roy Prize in English in the same year. This collection of essays looks at the sheer volume of archival deposits that have developed over recent decades, their materialization, their preservation, and the research produced about them. Collectively, the essays show how archival research is invested in "emotionally-engaged, emotionally-charged processes" that are transformative for those who interact with them. Moving Archives responds to what Sara Ahmed calls “affective economies” to produce new insight about the process of archiving and approaching literary materials.

She published The Routledge Introduction to Gender and Sexuality in Literature in Canada in 2023, which she wrote during her residence as the Farley Visiting Scholar at SFU (2022).

== Honors and awards ==
- Awarded a prize in the category of Education for the Women in Podcasting Awards, 2024.
- Finalist for a Lambda Prize in 2012 for her edition of Jane Rule's Taking My Life
- Finalist for the Gabrielle Prize in English in 2015 for her monograph, "Unarrested Archives"
- 2016 John A. Sproul Fellowship
- Awarded the Gabrielle Roy Prize in English in 2020 for Moving Archives
- Awarded the Canadian Studies Network Prize for Best Edited Collection in 2021 for On the Other Side(s) of 150
- 2021-2022 Jack & Nancy Farley Distinguished Visiting Scholar at Simon Fraser University
- Awarded the Outstanding Education Series Prize by the Canadian Podcasting Awards for her podcast, Getting Lit With Linda, in 2022
- Finalist for the People's Choice Podcast Awards in the "Grammar Girl - Education Category" in 2023
