= Patricia Charbonneau =

American actress (born 1959)

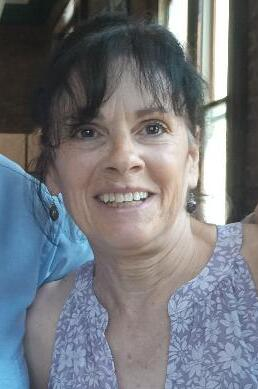
- Born: April 19, 1959 (age 67); Valley Stream, Long Island, New York, U.S.
- Education: Valley Stream Central High School; Boston University
- Occupation: Actress
- Years active: 1983–2008
- Known for: Desert Hearts; Call Me; RoboCop 2 Shakedown
- Spouse: Vincent Caggiano (m. 1982)
- Children: 1

Patricia Charbonneau (born April 19, 1959) is an American actress, perhaps best known for playing the part of Cay Rivvers in Desert Hearts (1985), her first film role, for which she was nominated for the Independent Spirit Award for Best Female Lead.

== Early life ==
Charbonneau was born in Valley Stream, New York on Long Island, the youngest of 10 children. Her father is French and her mother is Austrian. She graduated in 1977 from Valley Stream Central High School, which she attended with fellow actors Steve Buscemi and Steve Hytner. She later attended Boston University as a theater major, and left after a month to take a position with the Lexington Conservatory Theatre company in the Catskills.

== Early work ==
At age 19, Charbonneau moved to New York City. She appeared in New York in the Lexington Conservatory Theatre production of The Revengers, a rock opera adaptation by William C. Sandwick and Philip Soltanoff at Playwrights Horizons, alongside Sofia Landon Geier. She also studied with noted acting teacher Fred Kareman and worked in smaller roles, including a part with the New York City Opera. In 1982, as a member of the Actors Theatre of Louisville, she originated the role of Lea in My Sister in this House by Wendy Kesselman, a part that she also played Off-Broadway, helping to launch her film and television career.

== Desert Hearts ==
In 1985, Charbonneau made her film debut in Donna Deitch's film Desert Hearts, at a time when it was still considered a risk to portray a lesbian in a romantic drama, complete with a lengthy love scene. She told The Associated Press, "Kissing Helen [Shaver, her costar] wasn't the hard part, really. The hard part was walking out on the set naked and just standing there." Two days before shooting began, she found out that she was pregnant with her first child, whom she once called her "Desert Hearts baby."

For her performance in Desert Hearts, Charbonneau was nominated for a 1987 Independent Spirit Award for Best Female Lead.

== Other notable work ==
In the following year she appeared in Michael Mann's Manhunter (based on the novel Red Dragon) and then played Anna, the lead, in Call Me (1988), which also featured fellow Valley Streamer Buscemi. The same year, she was featured in the crime drama/action movie Shakedown. Her television work began with a 1986 NBC pilot C.A.T. Squad and continued with dozens of appearances, including HBO's Tales from the Crypt; Crime Story; The Equalizer; Wiseguy; Murder, She Wrote; Matlock; New York Undercover; and Law & Order: Criminal Intent. In the 1990 film RoboCop 2, she played the role of Linda Garcia. Despite the character's prominence in the movie's plot, her name is never spoken, and the role was not listed in the credits; observant fans were able to determine the character's name by noticing that she wore a name tag. In 1995, she starred in Mission Critical, a Legend Entertainment sci-fi adventure game. She played one of James Garner's daughters in the 1999 CBS made-for-TV film One Special Night, which featured Julie Andrews.

In March 2007, Charbonneau joined the faculty of the Hudson Valley Academy of Performing Arts in West Taghkanic, New York where she teaches an acting workshop for children and teens.

== Personal life ==
Charbonneau met musician Vincent Caggiano in 1978, and they married in 1982. She was pregnant with their only child, a daughter, during the filming of Desert Hearts.

== Filmography ==
=== Movies ===
Year	Title	Role	Notes
1983	MysteryDisc: Many Roads to Murder	Tracey Lowe	Direct-to-video
1985	Desert Hearts	Cay Rivvers	
1986	Manhunter	Mrs. Sherman	
1988	Shakedown	Susan Cantrell	
1988	Call Me	Anna	
1990	Brain Dead	Dana Martin	
1990	RoboCop 2	Robocop Tech Linda Garcia	Uncredited
1991	K2	Jackie Metcalf	
1996	Portraits of a Killer	Carolyn Price	
1998	Kiss the Sky	Franny	
1999	The Arrangement	Marion Markel	
1999	She's All That	Lois Siler	
1999	California Myth	Barbara	
2008	100 Feet	Frances	

=== Television ===
Year	Title	Role	Notes
1986	C.A.T. Squad	Nikki Blake	TV movie
1986–1987	Crime Story	Inger Thorson	Recurring role (season 1)
1987	The Equalizer	Sally Stevens	Episode: "High Performance"
1987	Spenser: For Hire	Linda Shannon	Episode: "Mary Hamilton"
1988	Disaster at Silo 7	Kathy Fitzgerald	TV movie
1988–1989	Wiseguy	Carole Sternberg	Recurring role (season 2)
1989	Unsub	Lucille	Episode: "Silent Stalker"
1989	Matlock	Madeline 'Maddy' Medford	Episode: "The Con Man"
1989	Desperado: Badlands Justice	Emily Harris	TV movie
1990	Booker	Clara	Episode: "Who Framed Roger Thornton?"
1990	Midnight Caller	Dakota Roberts	Episode: "Three for the Money"
1991	Murder, She Wrote	Diana Sterling	Episode: "From the Horse's Mouth"
1991	Father Dowling Mysteries	Laurie Kidd	Episode: "The Malibu Mystery"
1991	The Owl	Danny Santerre	TV movie
1991	Captive	Karen	TV movie
1992	The Commish	Catherine Belzer	Episode: "Sex, Love and Kerosene"
1992	Tales from the Crypt	Ellen Renfield	Episode: "Strung Along"
1993	Renegade	Janet	Episode: "Vanished"
1993	Walker, Texas Ranger	Robin Henley	Episode: "Storm Warning"
1994	Viper	Ella Keats	Episode: "Wheels of Fire"
1995	Extreme	Sheriff Lynn Roberts	Episode: "Pilot"
1995	seaQuest DSV	Elaine Morse	2 episodes
1996	Kindred: The Embraced	Camilla	Episode: "Bad Moon Rising"
1997	Profiler	Barbara Chapin	Episode: "Shattered Silence"
1997	New York Undercover	Jennifer Lewis	Episode: "School's Out"
1997	Diagnosis Murder	Fed. Marshal Monica Shattuck	Episode: "Deadly Games"
1998	Beyond Belief: Fact or Fiction	Woman Driving	Episode: "Bright Lights"
1999	One Special Night	Lori	TV movie
2000	Strange World		Episode: "Age of Reason"
2001	Law & Order: Criminal Intent	Sydney Markham	Episode: "The Extra Man"
2002	Law & Order	Janet Naiman	Episode: "Oxymoron"
2008	Law & Order: Special Victims Unit	Paige Beddles	Episode: "Streetwise"

=== Video games ===
Year	Title	Role
1995	Mission Critical	Lieutenant Commander Tran
