= Antony Ponzini =

American actor

- Born: June 1, 1933; Brooklyn, New York City, U.S.
- Died: December 30, 2002 (aged 69); Moosup, Connecticut, U.S.
- Years active: 1963-1996

Antony Ponzini (June 1, 1933 – December 30, 2002) was an American actor. Some of Ponzini's credits include roles on soap operas The Edge of Night, Another World, and being a member of the original cast of One Life to Live as Vince Wolek, the latter of which lasted from 1968 through 1975. Throughout the 1970s, 1980s, and 1990s, Ponzini became a familiar face on television with numerous guest appearances on some of that era's most popular TV shows (including: Kojak, The Jeffersons, The Bionic Woman, Starsky and Hutch, Hawaii Five-O, The Rockford Files, Lou Grant, Three's Company, Cagney & Lacey, Hill Street Blues, St. Elsewhere, The Love Boat, Falcon Crest, Hardcastle and McCormick, Knight Rider, Remington Steele, Who's the Boss?, Hunter, Columbo, Baywatch, Murphy Brown, Murder, She Wrote). Quite often he was cast as a "thug", "crime boss", or "tough cop." From 1989 to 1991, Ponzini played "Capt. Corelli", a recurring character (54 episodes) on the daytime soap opera Generations. He also appeared in Friday the 13th Part 4 as Vincent. In 1993, in one of Ponzini's most memorable roles, he played Enzo, the title role, in the Seinfeld episode The Barber.

== Filmography ==
=== Film ===
Year	Title	Role	Notes
1977	The Other Side of Midnight	Paul Metaxas	
1977	Relentless	Jack Hanratty	TV Movie
1978	Gray Lady Down	Caruso	
1979	...And Your Name is Jonah	Larry	TV Movie
1979	The Gift	Patsy	TV Movie
1980	Alcatraz: The Whole Shocking Story	John Anglin	TV Movie
1982	Some Kind of Hero	Sal	
1982	Moonlight	Victor Barbella	TV Movie
1984	Friday the 13th: The Final Chapter	Vincent	
1984	Hardbodies	Rocco	
1984	Fear City	Mobster #1	
1985	Desert Hearts	Joe	
1985	Stitches	The Commentator	
1995	Night of the Running Man	Ernie	
1996	Blood Money	Nick Vento	
1997	Opposite Corners	"Tootie"	

=== Television ===
Year	Title	Role	Notes
1963	General Hospital	Tony Perelli #2 (1980)	1 episode
1966-1967	Another World	Danny Fargo	8 episodes
1966	The Edge of Night	Tony Wyatt	1 episode
1968-1975	One Life to Live	Vince Wolek	36 episodes
1970	All My Children	Det. Victor Borelli (1986)	unknown episodes
1973	The Corner Bar		1 episode
1976	Serpico	Dominique	1 episode
1976-1979	Hawaii Five-O	Mack/Eddie Marco/Ray Santoro	4 episodes
1976	Bert D'Angelo/Superstar	Curt Haman	1 episode
1976	Delvecchio	Artie Kravens	1 episode
1976-1977	Kojak	Florello/Duff	2 episodes
1976	Wonderbug		1 episode
1977	Aspen	Ric	1 episode
1978	The Jeffersons	Neil	1 episode
1978	The Bionic Woman	Mauro	1 episode
1978	Starsky & Hutch	Trayman/Frank Stryker	2 episodes
1979	Flatbush	Esposito	2 episodes
1979	The Rockford Files	Tony Martine	1 episode
1980	Nobody's Perfect	Slade	1 episode
1981-1982	Lou Grant	Mario/Officer Polazzio	2 episodes
1982	Three's Company	Tony	1 episode
1982	Cagney & Lacey	Miles Grayson/Allen Brown	2 episodes
1983	Hill Street Blues	Boss	1 episode
1983-1985	Hardcastle and McCormick	Freddy Landers/Sid Storm	2 episodes
1983	St. Elsewhere	Detective Franco	1 episode
1984	The Love Boat	Al Dixon	1 episode
1984	Rituals	Detective Lucas Gates (1984-1985)	unknown episodes
1985	Scarecrow and Mrs. King	Nick Falcone	1 episode
1985	Falcon Crest	Mr. Wilson	1 episode
1986	Sidekicks	Detective Kelly	1 episode
1986	Knight Rider	Mel Tobey	1 episode
1986	Remington Steele	Pittsburgh Phil	1 episode
1987	Ohara	Alderson	1 episode
1989-1991	Generations	Capt. Corelli	54 episodes
1989	A Man Called Hawk	Taylor	1 episode
1990	B.L. Stryker	Jennings	1 episode
1990	Who's the Boss?	Dante	1 episode
1991	Hunter	Jim Matolla	1 episode
1991	Columbo	Gregry Lopiccolo	1 episode
1992	Dark Justice	Tony Paterno	1 episode
1993	Baywatch	Angelo Maceri	1 episode
1993	Seinfeld	Enzo	1 episode
1995	Murphy Brown	Guiseppe	1 episode
1995	Murder, She Wrote	Tomaso Clurillo	1 episode
1996	The Single Guy	Alfredo	1 episode
