= Jane Rule =

Canadian-American writer (1931–2007)

Jane Rule CM OBC
- Born: March 28, 1931; Plainfield, New Jersey, U.S.
- Died: 27 November 2007 (aged 76); Galiano Island, British Columbia, Canada
- Education: Mills College
- Occupation: Author
- Partner: Helen Sonthoff
- Writing career
- Language: English
- Genres: Fiction, non-fiction, essays
- Subject: Lesbian literature
- Notable work: Desert of the Heart (1964)

Jane Vance Rule CM OBC (28 March 1931 – 27 November 2007) was a Canadian-American writer of lesbian-themed works. Her first novel, Desert of the Heart, appeared in 1964, when gay activity was still a criminal offence. It turned Rule into a reluctant media celebrity, and brought her massive correspondence from women who had never dared explore lesbianism. Rule became an active anti-censorship campaigner, and served on the executive of the Writers' Union of Canada.

== Early life ==
Born in Plainfield, New Jersey, Jane Vance Rule was the oldest daughter of Carlotta Jane Hink-Packer and Arthur Richards Rule. Both her parents were college educated and her father worked in the military. Rule described her mother as "a materially spoiled and emotionally depraved [sic] only child". Rule was also the middle of three children, with an older brother and a younger sister.

Because she grew up in a military family, Rule moved frequently—to Hinsdale, Illinois, and later to California and Missouri, and then back to California where her father served in the Pacific during World War II. She says she was a tomboy growing up and felt like an outsider for reaching six feet tall by age 12 and being dyslexic. When she was 15 she read The Well of Loneliness and wrote later that she "suddenly discovered that [she] was a freak."

Rule earned a BA in English from Mills College in California in 1952. Almost immediately after graduation, she sailed in the Queen Mary to spend a year in London, following a female lover. There, she was an occasional student at University College, London, and began work on her first novel.

Rule returned to the U.S. to work at the writing department at Stanford University, but she quit after a few months because of "the competitive, commercial atmosphere of the school, the condescending attitude toward women students". She then lived at home with her parents until 1954.

Beginning in 1954, Rule taught at Concord Academy in Massachusetts where she met Helen Sonthoff (September 11, 1916 - January 3, 2000), a fellow creative writing and literature teacher. The two fell in love, but at the time of their meeting, Sonthoff was married.

Worried about politics and McCarthyism of the 50s in America, Rule moved with her friend and literary critic, John Hulcoop, to Vancouver, British Columbia in 1956. While there, she worked at the University of British Columbia, as well as wrote her first novel.

While living together, Rule and Hulcoop's relationship became romantic. However, that became complicated by the arrival of the woman Hulcoop would marry, as well as the arrival of Helen Sonthoff. Sonthoff was recently divorced and went to Vancouver for a vacation, which turned into a life-long relationship with Jane Rule.

== Career ==
Although Rule had finished writing her first novel, Desert of the Heart, in 1961, it was not published until 1964, after 22 rejections from publishers. The book features two women who fall in love, and ends overall-positively for the two. It caused Rule to be inundated with letters from desperate women discovering their lesbianism, as well as fearful and chilly reviews surrounding the homosexual theme. It was, after all, published five years before the decriminalization of homosexuality in Canada. Therefore, Rule became the spokesperson of all issues surrounding homosexuality in Canada, and she later wrote "I became, for the media, the only lesbian in Canada. A role I gradually and very reluctantly accepted and used to educate people as I could."

Rule wrote 11 more novels in the 70s and 80s, including her book Lesbian Images, a study of lesbian writers. Her other works during this time included fiction novels, essays, and short stories. In all of her work, she has become known for her eloquence in describing human relationships, both hetero and homosexual. Rule's wish was to be remembered as a Canadian writer, more than a lesbian or woman writer.

Rule served on the executive of the Writers' Union of Canada. She was an outspoken advocate of both free speech and gay rights, included in the various controversies surrounding the gay magazine The Body Politic, which she wrote for regularly, along with The Ladder. She was also a prominent anti-censorship figure (specifically about the seizure of gay and lesbian books).

In 1989, Rule donated a collection of her writings to the University of British Columbia. The collection was updated with more writings in 2016, and Helen Sonthoff's papers now also belong to the University of British Columbia.

Rule was inducted into the Order of British Columbia in 1998, and into the Order of Canada in 2007, both award ceremonies taking place, at Rule's initiative, in her home community of Galiano Island. Rule remarked "I chose Canada over 50 years ago. So it is very nice to have Canada choose me", about receiving the latter honor.

Rule received the Bill Whitehead Award for Lifetime Achievement from Publishing Triangle in 2002.

Desert of the Heart was the inspiration for the now cult-classic lesbian 1985 film Desert Hearts, directed by Donna Deitch.

Rule was also the subject of Lynne Fernie and Aerlyn Weissman's 1995 documentary film Fiction and Other Truths: A Film About Jane Rule.

== Personal life and death ==
Rule and Helen Sonthoff lived together from 1957 until Sonthoff's death in 2000. Sonthoff also taught at the University of British Columbia. The two became Canadian citizens in 1960.

Rule surprised some in the gay community by declaring herself against gay marriage, writing "To be forced back into the heterosexual cage of coupledom is not a step forward but a step back into state-imposed definitions of relationship. With all that we have learned, we should be helping our heterosexual brothers and sisters out of their state-defined prisons, not volunteering to join them there."

In 1976, Rule moved to Galiano Island along with Helen Sonthoff; the two remained there until the end of both their lives. They were well-known and loved on the island; Helen and Jane would give loans to the island's residents in need, as well as teach all the neighborhood children how to swim in their backyard pool.

By age 60, Rule was plagued with chronic arthritis, which ultimately dulled her desire to write. In 2007, she was diagnosed with liver cancer. She refused any radical treatment and instead continued swimming and living her life as usual. Prior to her death, Rule had already had two "living wakes" and felt that because of this, she would die elegantly. She died later that year, at the age of 76 on November 28, 2007, at home on Galiano Island. The ashes of Jane Vance Rule were interred in the Galiano Island Cemetery next to those of her beloved Helen Sonthoff.

The manuscript of Rule's memoir was found and published posthumously, Taking My Life, published in 2011. The manuscript was discovered by Linda M. Morra, who edited and annotated the book.

== Works ==
Rule was notable for being published in hardback by mainstream publishers, marking a shift from the era of lesbian pulp fiction. Much of her early work was later reissued by Naiad Press and others.

=== Novels ===
- 1964 : Desert of the Heart (Secker & Warburg)
- 1970 : This Is Not for You (McCall)
- 1971 : Against the Season (McCall)
- 1977 : The Young in One Another's Arms (Doubleday)
- 1980 : Contract with the World (Harcourt Brace Jovanovich)
- 1987 : Memory Board (Naiad)
- 1989 : After the Fire (Naiad)

=== Short stories ===
- 1975 : Theme for Diverse Instruments (Talonbooks)
- 1981 : Outlander, combines short stories and essays (Naiad)
- 1985 : Inland Passage (Naiad)

=== Non-fiction ===
- 1975 : Lesbian Images, essays (Doubleday)
- 1985 : A Hot-Eyed Moderate, essays (Naiad)
- 2008 : Loving the Difficult, essays (Hedgerow)

=== Posthumous non-fiction ===
Rule completed the preparation of Loving the Difficult before she died. Two further books have been drawn from her manuscripts and typescripts.

- 2011 : Taking My Life, autobiography (Talonbooks)
- 2017 : A Queer Love Story: The Letters of Jane Rule and Rick Bébout (UBC Press)
