= Jack McClelland (publisher) =

Canadian publisher (1922–2004)

- Born: John Gordon McClelland; July 30, 1922; Toronto, Ontario, Canada
- Died: June 14, 2004 (aged 81); Toronto, Ontario, Canada
- Education: University of Toronto
- Occupation: publisher
- Known for: president of McClelland and Stewart

John Gordon "Jack" McClelland CC (July 30, 1922 – June 14, 2004) was a Canadian publisher. He was known for promoting Canadian writers as president of the McClelland and Stewart publishing house.

== Education and military service ==
Born and raised in Toronto, Ontario, he attended the University of Toronto Schools, St. Andrew's College (1937–1940), and then the University of Toronto, where he was a member of the Alpha Delta Phi fraternity, interrupting his studies to serve in the Royal Canadian Navy in the Battle of the Atlantic.

== Career ==
McClelland began working for McClelland and Stewart, his father's company, in 1946, becoming president in 1961. Under his control, the company promoted Canadian literature and encouraged Canadian authors such as Margaret Atwood, Pierre Berton, Leonard Cohen, Marian Engel, Farley Mowat and Mordecai Richler. He introduced a popular series of Canadian authors in paperback, making Canadian writing more accessible to the general public. "I decided that I didn't want to be dependent on foreign agencies," he would recall. "I saw that a logical decision in London or New York could cut our volume in half. A Canadian nationalist was born overnight." In 1985, he sold the company.

Many subsequent heads of Canadian publishing companies got their start at McClelland and Stewart while Jack McClelland was running the company.

== Legacy and death ==
In 1976 he was made an Officer of the Order of Canada and was promoted to Companion in 2000.

He had been in poor health for some time when he died in Toronto in 2004 at the age of 81.

Leonard Cohen expressed his gratitude to McClelland by dedicating his 2004 album Dear Heather to him. The liner notes read "In memory of Jack McClelland, 1922–2004"

== Bibliography ==
- Imagining Canadian Literature: The Selected Letters of Jack McClelland, Toronto: Key Porter, 1998. (edited by Sam Solecki)
- Margaret Laurence and Jack McClelland, Letters, University of Alberta Press, 2018. (edited by Laura K. Davis and Linda M. Morra)

== Biography ==
- James King, Jack: The Story of Jack McClelland, Toronto: Knopf Canada, 1999.
