= Desert of the Heart =

1964 novel by Jane Rule

- First edition
- Author: Jane Rule
- Language: English
- Genre: Lesbian literature
- Publisher: Macmillan Canada
- Publication date: 1964
- Publication place: Canada
- OCLC: 137262687

Desert of the Heart is a 1964 novel written by Jane Rule. The story was adapted into the 1985 film Desert Hearts, directed by Donna Deitch. The book was originally published in hardback by Macmillan Canada. It was one of the very few novels addressing lesbianism that was published in hardback form; most books during this period with female homosexuality as a topic were considered lesbian pulp fiction until 1969.

At the time the novel was published, Rule was a lecturer at the University of British Columbia in Vancouver, and because the novel dealt with lesbian romance, her job was threatened.

Desert of the Heart was first republished in paperback form by Talonbooks in 1977.

== Background ==
Rule's family lived in Reno, Nevada, where the book is set, and although she was not a resident, she visited them. One summer, Rule worked in a casino to research for the book and was impressive in her competence. Rule completed the book in 1961 and spent three years trying to find a publisher for it, eventually sending it to about 25 American publishers. Rule remembered that one publisher told her, "If this book isn't pornographic, what's the point of printing it? ... if you can write in the dirty parts we'll take it but otherwise no".

== Plot summary ==
Evelyn Hall is an English professor from the University of California. She arrives in Reno to establish a six-week residency to attain a quick divorce, which Nevada was known for at that time. After being married for 15 years, she is overwhelmed with guilt for feeling as if she is ruining her husband's mental health. While in Reno, she stays in the guest home of Frances Packer with other women awaiting their divorces. Frances also lives with Walter, her 18-year-old son and her late lover's 25-year-old daughter, Ann Childs. Evelyn and Ann are startled at how alike they are in appearance, despite their 15-year age difference.

Ann works as a change operator at a local casino and as a relatively successful cartoonist. Ann is revealed to reject significant relationships in her life, and although she is romantic with both men and women, she refuses to become attached to anyone. She is ending a relationship with her boss, Bill, that was significant enough to make her friends believe they were to be married. Ann's best friend is Silver, who works with her at the casino as a dealer, and is also a sometime lover.

Evelyn and Ann begin a friendship that evolves into a romantic relationship in which Evelyn must deal with her guilt after being asked by her husband's doctor to divorce him for his own good. Despite the symptoms of his deep and chronic depression, Evelyn takes the responsibility for the failure of the marriage and his depression upon herself, but after divulging how caustic she is to Ann, she is relieved to realize that the responsibility is not hers to take. Ann must subsequently deal with committing to a relationship wholeheartedly. Being employed by the casino, she is rather well-paid, but is stifled within the atmosphere there, though she continues to work despite her abilities.

Ann is fired from the casino after a slot machine is stolen on her shift when she is distracted by Evelyn being at the casino. Ann's previous split with Bill is not amicable, despite Bill beginning to date another of his employees. There is some suspicion that Bill is spying on Ann and Evelyn, and he threatens to contact Evelyn's husband's lawyer to notify him of Ann and Evelyn's lesbian relationship, but the divorce is finalized without his interference. Immediately after the final hearing, Evelyn and Ann decide to live together "for a while."

== Origin of the title ==
The story is set in Reno, Nevada, around which spreads an expanse of desert that initially strikes fear into Evelyn upon her arrival and has been a comfort to Ann during her existence there. It is used to describe Evelyn's lack of knowledge of what real love is, when she tells Ann that she lives "in the desert of the heart." After she falls in love with Ann, the desert surrounding Reno ceases to terrify her. Simultaneously, the desert also ceases to comfort Ann as a place to run to be alone.

Along with the desert climate as a symbol, the setting of the casino in which Ann works and Evelyn visits is also considered a desert of morality. Ann is witness to what the addiction of gambling does to people of all walks of life, including the employees. Being fired from the casino frees Ann from her refusals to care about what happens to the gambling addicts, dealers, other change aprons, and the casino management, and allows her to commit to a more refined life with Evelyn.

The title is taken from a poem by W.H. Auden, his elegy for Yeats. "In the desert of the heart, Let the healing fountain start." Evelyn is a professor of English literature, and she quotes from some of Yeats' poems.

== Reception ==
Rule's first novel received warm praise from literary critics who described it as "an intelligent novel, not afraid of ideas, and not committed to them overdiagrammatically." Rule's prose did not sensationalize the relationship between Evelyn and Ann, choosing a detached method of writing. One reviewer noted, "Miss Rule is so arbitrary in her depiction of the major characters' psyche-searching and so sketchy in her description of minor figures that the reader is apt to have little empathy with anyone." One reviewer cautioned potential readers that despite the lack of sensationalism, "The Desert of the Heart is not recommended to those who find sexual perversion an uncomfortable subject."

Desert of the Heart was highly recommended by Gene Damon in The Ladder, who called it "a symbolic delight."

Rule remembered the mail she got from women who read the book. "I got a huge amount of fan mail which I didn't expect. I thought movie stars got fan mail. People were writing things like you are the only person in the world who could possibly understand who I am, how I feel, if I'm not able to talk to someone I'm going to kill myself...it just felt to me overwhelming and depressing that there was so much fear and so much self-hatred and so much loneliness."

It tied for 10th place on a list of top ten gay novels by Bibliofemme, an Irish book club.

== Editions ==
- 1964 – Toronto: Macmillan Canada
- 1964 – London: Secker and Warburg
- 1965 – Cleveland: World
- 1975 – New York: Arno
- 1977 – Vancouver: Talonbooks
- 1983 – Tallahassee, FL: Naiad
- 1991 – Vancouver: Talonbooks
- 1995 – London: Silver Moon
