= Helen Shaver =

Canadian actress and director

- Shaver in 2026
- Born: February 24, 1951 (age 75); St. Thomas, Ontario, Canada
- Occupations: Actress, director
- Years active: 1972–present
- Spouses: Steven Reuther (m. 1979; div. 1982) Steve Smith (m. 1988)
- Children: 1

Helen Shaver (born February 24, 1951) is a Canadian actress and film and television director. After appearing in a number of Canadian movies, she received a Canadian Screen Award for Best Actress for her performance in the romantic drama In Praise of Older Women (1978). She later appeared in the films The Amityville Horror (1979), The Osterman Weekend (1983), Desert Hearts (1985), The Color of Money (1986), The Believers (1987), The Craft (1996), Tremors 2: Aftershocks (1996) and Down River (2013). She received another Canadian Screen Award for Best Actress nomination for the 1986 drama film Lost!, and won a Best Supporting Actress for We All Fall Down (2000). Shaver also starred in some short-lived television series, including United States (1980) and Jessica Novak (1981), and from 1996 to 1999 starred in the Showtime horror series, Poltergeist: The Legacy, for which she received a Saturn Award for Best Actress on Television nomination.

In the mid-1990s, Shaver began working as a television director, directing more than 50 shows. She won three Directors Guild of Canada Awards, one Directors Guild of America Award for Outstanding Directing – Miniseries or TV Film, two Canadian Screen Awards, and three Women's Image Network Awards. She was nominated for an Emmy Award for directing the 1999 television movie Summer's End and in 2020 made her big screen debut with the drama film Happy Place. In 2004, Shaver was inducted into Canada's Walk of Fame.

== Early life ==
Shaver was born and raised with five sisters in St. Thomas, Ontario, Canada.

== Career ==
After roles in Canadian features such as Outrageous! (1977), Starship Invasions (1977), Who Has Seen the Wind (1977) and High Ballin' (1978), Shaver won a Canadian Film Award as Best Lead Actress opposite Tom Berenger (for her performance as "Ann MacDonald") in In Praise of Older Women (1978).

Shaver was one of the stars of director Sam Peckinpah's final film, 1983's The Osterman Weekend. In 1985, Shaver starred in Desert Hearts as a 1950s university professor who falls in love with another woman. Her performance, with co-star Patricia Charbonneau, drew critical praise and Shaver won the Bronze Leopard Award at the Locarno International Film Festival. Another prominent film performance during that time came in 1986 as the love interest of Paul Newman in his Oscar-winning portrayal of "Fast" Eddie Felson in Martin Scorsese's The Color of Money, a sequel to 1961's The Hustler.

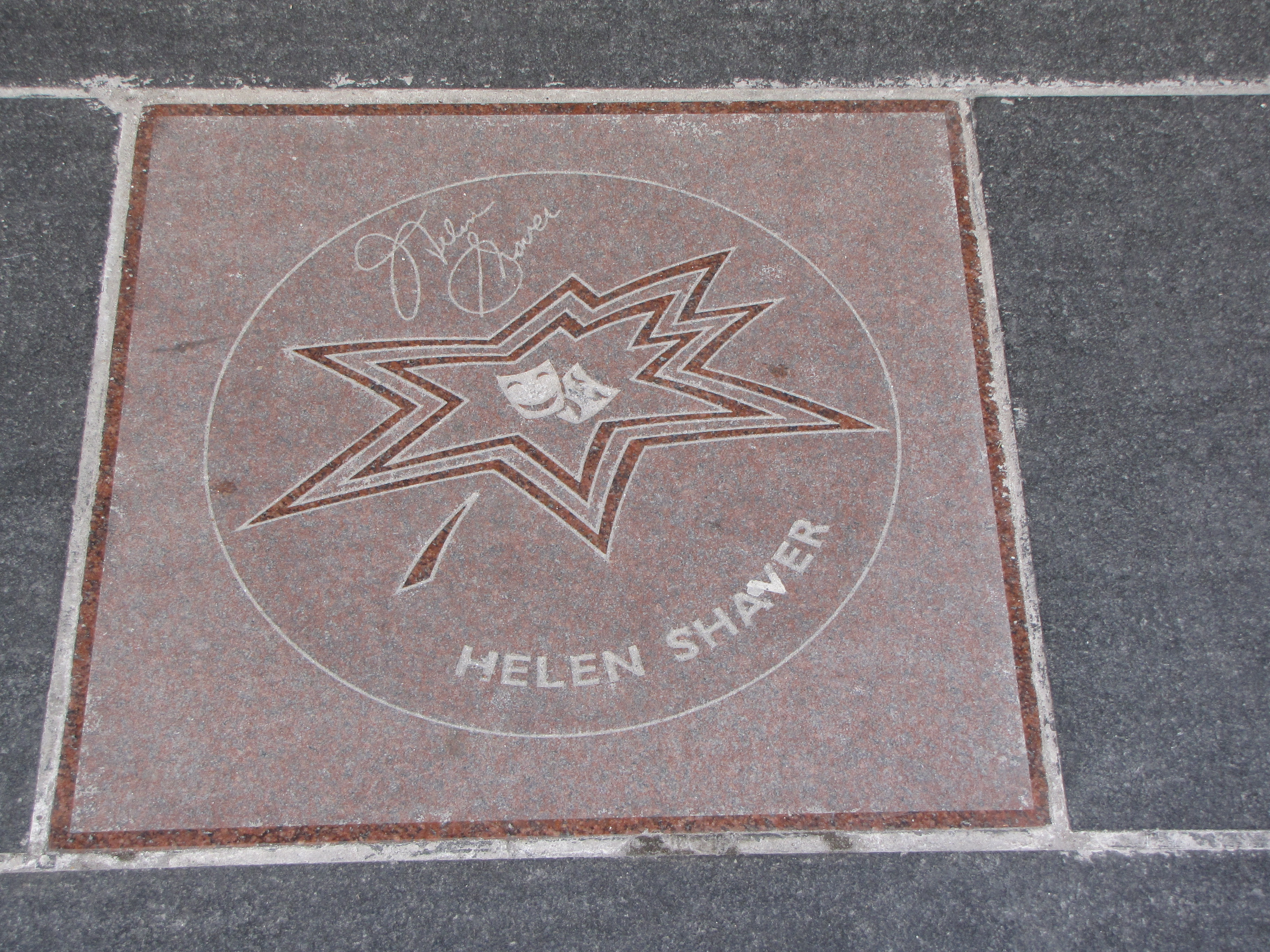
Helen Shaver's star on Canada's Walk of Fame

In 1980, Shaver starred with Beau Bridges in the short-lived NBC television series United States developed by Larry Gelbart. A year later she starred in the short-lived drama series Jessica Novak. She was in the 1984 Canadian-made Countdown to Looking Glass. She subsequently appeared on such television shows as Hill Street Blues and T. J. Hooker. In 1990, she guest-starred as the murderer in Rest in Peace, Mrs. Columbo, and later that year co-starred on the short-lived series WIOU, playing a television journalist (as she also did on Jessica Novak). From 1996-1999, Shaver co-starred on the television series Poltergeist: The Legacy, playing Dr. Rachel Corrigan, a widowed psychiatrist with an eight-year-old daughter who is helped by the Legacy in the pilot episode; her performance earned a Saturn Award nomination. In 2000, she won a Genie Award for her portrayal of a drug-addicted prostitute in the independent feature We All Fall Down.

Shaver made her feature-length directorial debut in 1999 with the television film Summer's End, which won an Emmy and earned her a directorial nomination. Shaver has also directed a number of television shows and cable movies, including The Outer Limits, Judging Amy, Joan of Arcadia, Medium, The O.C., Law & Order: Special Victims Unit, The L Word, Jericho, Journeyman, Private Practice, The Unit, Crusoe, Orphan Black, Vikings, 13 Reasons Why, and Westworld. In 2003, she won a Gemini award for Best Direction in a Dramatic Series for the Just Cause television series episode "Death's Details".

In 2004, Shaver was inducted into Canada's Walk of Fame.

Happy Place, her first theatrical feature film after directing for television, premiered at the Cinéfest Sudbury International Film Festival, and was screened at the 2020 Vancouver International Film Festival.

In 2021, Shaver picked up The Living Legend Tribute at the 23rd Women's Image Network Awards with fellow honoree JoJo Siwa its Rising Musical Star recipient.

In 2023, Shaver won the DGA award for directing episode 8 ("Who's There?") of Station Eleven.

== Filmography ==
=== Film ===
Year	Title	Role	Notes
1976	The Supreme Kid	Girl Hitch-Hiker	Make-up
1976	Shoot	Paula	
1977	Outrageous!	Jo	
1977	Starship Invasions	Betty Duncan	
1977	Who Has Seen the Wind	Ruth Thompson	
1978	High-Ballin'	"Pickup"	
1978	In Praise of Older Women	Ann MacDonald	Canadian Screen Award for Best Actress
1979	The Amityville Horror	Carolyn	
1980	Coming Out Alive	Isobel	
1981	Gas	Rhonda	
1982	Harry Tracy, Desperado	Catherine Tuttle	
1983	The Osterman Weekend	Virginia Tremayne	
1984	Best Defense	Clair Lewis	
1984	Body Double	Voice of Gloria Revelle (uncredited)	
1985	Desert Hearts	Vivian Bell	Locarno International Film Festival Bronze Leopard
1985	The War Boy	Maria	
1986	Lost!	Linda	Nominated — Canadian Screen Award for Best Actress
1986	The Men's Club	Sarah	
1986	The Color of Money	Janelle	
1987	The Believers	Jessica Halliday	
1988	The Land Before Time	Littlefoot's Mother	
1989	Tree of Hands	Benet Archdale	
1990	Bethune: The Making of a Hero	Veronica Dowd	
1991	A Smile in the Dark	The Devil	
1992	Zebrahead	Diane	
1992	That Night	Ann O'Connor	
1993	Morning Glory	Lula Peak	
1995	Open Season	Rachel Rowen	
1995	Born to Be Wild	Margaret Heller	
1996	The Craft	Grace Downs	
1996	Rowing Through	"Slim"	
1996	Tremors 2: Aftershocks	Dr. Kate Riley	
1996	Egg Salad	Gladys	Short
1999	The Wishing Tree	Wallis Caldwell	
2000	Bear with Me	Sara Bradley	
2000	We All Fall Down	Sherry	Canadian Screen Award for Best Supporting Actress
2004	The Keeper	Ruthie	
2007	Numb	Audrey Milbank	
2013	Birthday Cake	Judith Ferguson	
2013	Down River	Pearl	Nominated — Leo Award for Best Lead Performance by a Female in a Motion Picture; Nominated — ACTRA Award for Outstanding Performance - Female
2018	Souls of Totality	Shepherd One	Short

=== Television ===
Year	Title	Role	Notes
1974	The Beachcombers		"Affairs of the Heart"
1974	Police Surgeon	Gloria	"The Killer"
1975	Police Surgeon	Bonnie	"Web of Guilt"
1977	Search and Rescue: The Alpha Team	Dr. Liz Warren	TV film
1978	Lovey: A Circle of Children, Part II	Patty	TV film
1979	Overlanders	Mrs. O'Mara	TV film
1980	United States	Libby Chapin	Main role
1981	Jessica Novak	Jessica Novak	Main role
1982	Between Two Brothers	Susan Frazer	TV film
1982	Off Your Rocker	Miss Beecher	TV film
1982	Hill Street Blues	Teresa Hyler	4 episodes
1983	T. J. Hooker	Lisa Jericho	"The Shadow of Truth"
1984	Countdown to Looking Glass	Dorian Waldorf	TV film
1985	The Park Is Mine	Valery	TV film
1986	Amazing Stories	Karen	"Mirror, Mirror"
1986	Philip Marlowe, Private Eye	Belle Delaguerra	"Spanish Blood"
1986	The Edison Twins	Phyllis Dayton	"The Case of the Friendly Fugitive", "Gems and Jelly Beans", "The Maharajah of Weston"
1986	Many Happy Returns	Sally Robinson	TV film
1987	The Tonight Show Starring Johnny Carson	Herself	TV talk show, June 25, 1987
1988	The Ray Bradbury Theater	Miss Haight	"The Emissary"
1988	No Blame	Amy Donaldson	TV film Nominated — Gemini Award for Best Performance by a Lead Actress in a Dramatic Program or Mini-Series
1989	B.L. Stryker	Diane Decker	"The Dancer's Touch"
1989	Mothers, Daughters and Lovers	Claire Nichols	TV film
1990	Pair of Aces	Rose	TV film
1990	Columbo	Vivian Dimitri	"Rest in Peace, Mrs. Columbo"
1990–1991	WIOU	Kelby Robinson	Main role
1992	E.N.G.	Sandra Brady	"Child's Play"
1992	Fatal Memories	Elaine Tipton	TV film
1993	Survive the Night	Stacy	TV film
1993	Poisoned by Love: The Kern County Murders	Edie Ballew	TV film
1993	Trial & Error	Katherine Woodfield	TV film
1994	The Forget-Me-Not Murders	Monique	TV film
1994	Ride with the Wind	Katherine Barnes	TV film
1994	Without Consent	Nora Fields	TV film
1994	Janek: The Silent Betrayal	Monique Dessier	TV film
1995	Falling for You	Mary	TV film
1995	The Outer Limits	Cathy Kress	"The Sandkings"; Nominated — CableACE Award for Actress in a Dramatic Series
1996–1999	Poltergeist: The Legacy	Dr. Rachel Corrigan	Main role Nominated — Saturn Award for Best Actress on Television
1997	Dead Man's Gun	Dianna McKinney	"Next of Kin"
1998	The Sweetest Gift	Mrs. Martin	TV film
1999	The First Gentleman	Marjorie Litchfield	TV film
2000	Common Ground	Janet	TV film
2001–2002	The Education of Max Bickford	Erica Bettis	Main role
2003	The Risen	Lynn Todd	TV film
2003	D.C. Sniper: 23 Days of Fear	Sandy Moose	TV film
2004	The L Word	Faye Buckley	"Luck, Next Time", "Liberally"
2004	The 4400	Barbara Yates	"Becoming", "Trial by Fire"
2008	A Very Merry Daughter of the Bride	Rose	TV film
2010	Iris Expanding	Iris's Mom	TV film

=== Director ===
Year	Title	Note(s)
1996–1999	Poltergeist: The Legacy	2 episodes
1997–2000	The Outer Limits	6 episodes
1998	Dead Man's Gun	Episode: "Stage Coach Marty"
1998	The Net	Episode: "Bulls and Bears"
1999	Summer's End	TV movie
2000–2001	Beggars and Choosers	2 episodes
2001	The Associates	Unknown episodes
2001	Soul Food	Episode: "This Crazy Life"
2001–2005	Judging Amy	11 episodes
2002	The District	Episode: "Shell Game"
2002	Due East	TV movie
2003	Just Cause	Episode: "Death's Details"
2003	Dead Like Me	Episode: "Rest in Peace"
2003	Joan of Arcadia	Episode: "The Uncertainty Principle"
2004	The O.C.	Episode: "The Proposal"
2004	The 4400	Episode: "The New and Improved Carl Morrissey"
2005	Close to Home	Episode: "Divine Directions"
2005	The Stranger I Married	TV movie
2006	Medium	Episode: "Doctor's Orders"
2006–2007	The Unit	3 episodes
2006	Vanished	Episode: "The Feed"
2006	Standoff	Episode: "Borderline"
2006	Ultra	TV movie
2007	Jericho	Episode: "Black Jack"
2007	Journeyman	Episode: "Winterland"
2008–2011	Law & Order: Special Victims Unit	9 episodes
2008–2009	Crusoe	2 episodes
2008–2009	Private Practice	2 episodes
2009	Castle	Episode: "One Man's Treasure"
2010	Make It or Break It	Episode: "Save the Last Dance"
2010	The Bridge	2 episodes
2010	Shattered	2 episodes
2011	Flashpoint	Episode: "I'd Do Anything"
2011	Stargate Universe	Episode: "Seizure"
2011	Law & Order: LA	Episode: "Big Rock Mesa"
2011	Combat Hospital	2 episodes
2012	The Firm	5 episodes
2012–2015	Person of Interest	3 episodes
2013	Republic of Doyle	Episode: "Firecracker"
2013–2014	Revolution	3 episodes
2014	Reign	Episode: "For King and Country"
2014	Elementary	Episode: "Dead Clade Walking"
2014–2017	Orphan Black	3 episodes
2015–2019	Vikings	6 episodes
2016	Heartbeat	Episode: "100,000 Heartbeats"
2016	Travelers	2 episodes
2017–2018	Anne with an E	2 episodes
2017	13 Reasons Why	2 episodes
2018	Sneaky Pete	Episode: "The Reluctant Taxidermist"
2018	Impulse	Episode: "The Eagle and the Bee"
2018	Dietland	2 episodes
2020	Westworld	Episode: "Passed Pawn"
2020	Snowpiercer	2 episodes
2020	Lovecraft Country	Episode: "Meet Me in Daegu"
2020	Happy Place	Feature film
2021–2022	Station Eleven	3 episodes
2022	Quantum Leap	Episode: "What a Disaster!"
2023	The New Look	4 episodes
2024	The Penguin	Episodes: "Cent'Anni" and "Homecoming"
2026	Matlock	Episode: "The Greater Good"

== Awards and nominations ==
Year	Award	Category	Work	Result	Ref.
1999	Leo Awards	Best Direction: Dramatic Series	The Outer Limits, episode: "Lithia"	Nominated	
2001	Genie Awards	Best Performance by an Actress in a Supporting Role	We All Fall Down	Won	
2001	Leo Awards	Best Performance by a Female: Feature Length Drama	We All Fall Down	Nominated	
2014	Leo Awards	Best Lead Performance by a Female: Motion Picture	Down River	Nominated	
2017	DGC Awards	Outstanding Directorial Achievement in Dramatic Series	Vikings, episode: "Promised"	Won	
2018	Canadian Screen Awards	Best Direction: Dramatic series	Anne With an E, episode: "I Am No Bird, And No Net Ensnares Me"	Nominated	
2019	Leo Awards	Best Direction: Dramatic Series	Anne With an E, episode: "Youth Is The Season Of Hope"	Nominated	
2022	DGC Awards	Outstanding Directorial Achievement in Dramatic Series	Maid, episode: "String Cheese"	Nominated	
2022	DGC Awards	Outstanding Directorial Achievement in Movies for Television and Mini-Series	Station Eleven, episode: "Who's There?"	Won	
2025	Primetime Emmy Awards	Outstanding Directing for a Limited or Anthology Series or Movie	The Penguin, episode: "Cent'anni"	Nominated	
