= List of Canadian films of 1983 =

This is a list of Canadian films which were released in 1983:

Title	Director	Cast	Genre	Notes
A 20th Century Chocolate Cake	Lois Siegel	Greg Van Riel, Charles Fisch, Stephen Lack	Comedy	
All in Good Taste	Anthony Kramreither	Jonathan Welsh, Jim Carrey	Comedy	
American Nightmare	Don McBrearty		Horror	
Au clair de la lune	André Forcier	Michel Côté, Pierre Girard	Fantasy drama	
The Ballad of Hard Times (La turlute des années dures)	Richard Boutet, Pascal Gélinas		Documentary	
Boys and Girls	Don McBrearty	Megan Follows, David Fox	Short	Oscar winner
A Christmas Story	Bob Clark	Melinda Dillon, Darren McGavin, Peter Billingsley, Ian Petrella, Scott Schwartz	Comedy	Based on short stories by Jean Shepherd; Genie Awards – Director, Screenplay; made with U.S. financing
Cross Country	Paul Lynch	Richard Beymer, Nina Axelrod, Brent Carver, Michael Ironside	Drama	
Curtains	Richard Ciupka	John Vernon, Linda Thorson, Samantha Eggar, Anne Ditchburn, Lynne Griffin, Lesleh Donaldson	Horror	
David Roche Talks to You About Love	Jeremy Podeswa	David Roche	Short drama	
Dead Wrong	Len Kowalewich	Winston Rekert, Britt Ekland	Crime drama	
Deserters	Jack Darcus	Alan Scarfe, Dermot Hennelly, Barbara March	Drama	
Flamenco at 5:15	Cynthia Scott		National Film Board documentary	Academy Award for Documentary Short Subject
Falasha: Exile of the Black Jews	Simcha Jacobovici		Documentary	
For Those I Loved	Robert Enrico	Michael York, Brigitte Fossey, Helen Hughes	Drama	Canada-France co-production
The Funny Farm	Ron Clark	Miles Chapin, Peter Aykroyd, Howie Mandel, Tracy Bregman, Jack Blum, Maurice LaMarche	Comedy	
Gehri Chot - Urf: Durdesh	Ambrish Sangal		Drama	India-Canada coproduction
Going Berserk	David Steinberg	John Candy, Joe Flaherty, Eugene Levy, Pat Hingle, Alley Mills	Comedy	
Hey Babe!	Rafal Zielinski	Buddy Hackett, Yasmine Bleeth	Musical	
I Am a Hotel	Allan F. Nichols		Short drama, musical	
I Think of You Often	Scott Barrie		Short documentary	
Just a Game (Rien qu'un jeu)	Brigitte Sauriol	Raymond Cloutier, Marie Tifo	Drama	
The Kid Who Couldn't Miss	Paul Cowan	Eric Peterson	National Film Board docudrama	Based partly on John Gray’s irreverent stage play Billy Bishop Goes to War.
Losin' It	Curtis Hanson	Tom Cruise, Jackie Earle Haley, John Stockwell, Shelley Long, John Navin	Comedy	Released just prior to Tom Cruise's breakout role in Risky Business and made with U.S. financing.
Lucien Brouillard	Bruno Carrière	Pierre Curzi, Marie Tifo	Drama	
Maria Chapdelaine	Gilles Carle	Carole Laure, Nick Mancuso	historical drama	Based on the novel by Louis Hémon; Genie Awards – Cinematography, Art Direction, Costumes
Narcissus	Norman McLaren	Jean-Louis Morin		Norman McLaren's final film
Of Unknown Origin	George P. Cosmatos	Peter Weller, Jennifer Dale, Kenneth Welsh	Horror	Made with U.S. financing
Porky's II: The Next Day	Bob Clark	Don Monahan, Wyatt Knight, Mark Herrier, Roger Wilson, Bill Wiley	Teen comedy	Made with U.S. financing
Pourquoi l'étrange Monsieur Zolock s'intéressait-il tant à la bande dessinée?	Yves Simoneau	Jean-Louis Millette, Michel Rivard	Docudrama	
The Profession of Arms	Michael Bryans, Tina Viljoen		Documentary	
Rock & Rule	Clive A. Smith	voices: Greg Salata, Susan Roman	Animated musical	
The Ruffian	José Giovanni		Crime drama	
Running Brave	Don Shebib	Robby Benson, Pat Hingle, August Schellenberg, Graham Greene	Bio-drama on the life of Billy Mills	
Screwballs	Rafal Zielinski		Sex Comedy	
Skullduggery	Ota Richter	David Calderisi, Wendy Crewson	Horror	
Siege	Paul Donovan	Doug Lennox, Tom Nardini	Thriller	
Snow	Tibor Takács	Douglas Campbell, Torquil Campbell, Cynthia Dale	Short drama	
Spasms	William Fruet	Peter Fonda, Oliver Reed, Kerrie Keane, Al Waxman	Horror	
Stations	William D. MacGillivray	Mike Jones	Comedy-drama	
Strange Brew	Rick Moranis Dave Thomas	Rick Moranis, Dave Thomas, Max von Sydow	Comedy	The adventures of the Bob and Doug McKenzie from SCTV; Golden Reel Award
Tell Me That You Love Me	Tzipi Trope	Nick Mancuso, Barbara Williams, Andrée Pelletier, Kenneth Welsh	Drama	Canadian-Israeli coproduction
The Terry Fox Story	Ralph L. Thomas	Robert Duvall, Eric Fryer, Chris Makepeace, Rosalind Chao	Bio-drama of amputee Terry Fox's run across Canada	
The Tin Flute (Bonheur d'occasion)	Claude Fournier	Mireille Deyglun, Marilyn Lightstone, Michel Forget		Based on the Gabrielle Roy novel
To the Rhythm of My Heart (Au rythme de mon coeur)	Jean Pierre Lefebvre		Documentary	
Ups and Downs	Paul Almond	Colin Skinner, Andrew Sabiston, Leslie Hope	Drama	
Utilities	Harvey Hart	Robert Hays, Brooke Adams, John Marley	Drama	
Videodrome	David Cronenberg	James Woods, Sonja Smits, Deborah Harry, Peter Dvorsky, Les Carlson	Sci-fi drama	Genie Award - Director
The Wars	Robin Phillips	Brent Carver, Martha Henry, William Hutt, Ann-Marie MacDonald, Jackie Burroughs	Family drama	Based on the novel by Timothy Findley; Genie Awards – Actress (Henry), Supporting Actress (Burroughs)

== See also ==
- 1983 in Canada
- 1983 in Canadian television
