= 5th Genie Awards =

1984 Canadian film awards

- Date: March 21, 1984
- Site: Royal Alexandra Theatre; Toronto, Ontario
- Hosted by: Louis Del Grande

Highlights
- Best Picture: The Terry Fox Story
- Most awards: The Terry Fox Story (5)
- Most nominations: Maria Chapdelaine (11)

Television coverage
- Network: CBC Television

The 5th Genie Awards were presented on March 21, 1984, to honour films released in 1983.

This year's entries numbered 15 features, 14 theatrical shorts and 5 theatrical documentaries. Maria Chapdelaine led with 11 nominations overall. However, the nominations were criticized for the fact that three of the five nominees for Best Picture, Maria Chapdelaine, The Terry Fox Story and The Wars, failed to garner Best Director nominations. After surveys, polls and scrutiny, it was found that the voting system was valid and it remained unchanged.

After much debate, the contentious categories of Best Foreign Actor and Best Foreign Actors were dropped. A new points system was instituted which encouraged creative input by Canadians in the awards categories, while allowing some foreign participation and co-production eligibility.

The ceremony, which was hosted by comedian Louis Del Grande, was noted for the participation of Prime Minister Pierre Trudeau, as presenter of the award for Best Picture. The Globe and Mail film critic Jay Scott criticized his inclusion, writing "Why did he agree to participate in this thing? In the closing moments of his stewardship has he developed an uncontrollable urge to know what it's like to be Ronald Reagan?"

== Winners and nominees ==
Motion Picture	Direction
The Terry Fox Story — Robert M. Cooper; A Christmas Story — Bob Clark, René Dupont; Lucien Brouillard — René Gueissaz, Marc Daigle; Maria Chapdelaine — Murray Shostak, Robert Baylis; The Wars — Robin Phillips	Bob Clark, A Christmas Story; David Cronenberg, Videodrome; Bruno Carrière, Lucien Brouillard; Jack Darcus, Deserters; André Forcier, Au clair de la lune; Brigitte Sauriol, Just a Game (Rien qu'un jeu)
Actor in a leading role	Actress in a leading role
Eric Fryer, The Terry Fox Story; Pierre Curzi, Lucien Brouillard; Guy L'Écuyer, Au clair de la lune; Nick Mancuso, Maria Chapdelaine; Alan Scarfe, Deserters	Martha Henry, The Wars; Carole Laure, Maria Chapdelaine; Barbara March, Deserters; Marie Tifo, Lucien Brouillard; Marie Tifo, Just a Game (Rien qu'un jeu)
Actor in a supporting role	Actress in a supporting role
Michael Zelniker, The Terry Fox Story; Leslie Carlson, Videodrome; Pierre Curzi, Maria Chapdelaine; Peter Dvorsky, Videodrome; Kenneth Welsh, Tell Me That You Love Me	Jackie Burroughs, The Wars; Amulette Garneau, Maria Chapdelaine; Elva Mai Hoover, The Terry Fox Story; Tedde Moore, A Christmas Story; Sonja Smits, Videodrome; Linda Sorgini, The Tin Flute (Bonheur d'occasion)
Screenplay	Documentary
Bob Clark, A Christmas Story; David Cronenberg, Videodrome; Jack Darcus, Deserters; Timothy Findley, The Wars	Pourquoi l'étrange Monsieur Zolock s'intéressait-il tant à la bande dessinée? — Nicole M. Boisvert; The Ballad of Hard Times (La Turlute des années dures) — Lucille Veilleux; Thunder Drum (Mémoire battante) — Nicole Lamothe, Arthur Lamothe
Art Direction/Production Design	Cinematography
Jocelyn Joly, Maria Chapdelaine; Gilles Aird, Lucien Brouillard; Glenn Bydwell, Ups and Downs; Carol Spier, Videodrome	Pierre Mignot, Maria Chapdelaine; Richard Ciupka, The Terry Fox Story; Mark Irwin, Videodrome; Doug McKay, Dead Wrong; Reginald H. Morris, A Christmas Story
Costume Design	Editing
Michèle Hamel, Maria Chapdelaine; Michèle Hamel, Lucien Brouillard; François Laplante, Au clair de la lune; Mary E. McLeod, A Christmas Story; Nicole Pelletier, The Tin Flute (Bonheur d'occasion)	Ron Wisman, The Terry Fox Story; Stan Cole, A Christmas Story; André Corriveau, The Tin Flute (Bonheur d'occasion); Tony Lower, The Wars; Bill Roxborough, Doris Dyck, Jack Darcus, and Ingrid Rosen, Deserters; Ronald Sanders, Videodrome
Overall Sound	Sound Editing
Joe Grimaldi, Bruce Carwardine, Austin Grimaldi, Glen Gauthier, The Terry Fox Story; Kenneth Heeley-Ray, David Appleby, Dino Pigat, A Christmas Story; Austin Grimaldi, Patrick Rousseau, Joe Grimaldi, and Dino Pigat, Maria Chapdelaine; Dino Pigat, David Appleby, and Lars Ekstrom, Ups and Downs; Hans Peter Strobl, The Wars	Joe Grimaldi, Bruce Carwardine, Austin Grimaldi, and Glen Gauthier, The Terry Fox Story; Sharon Lackie, Bruce Nyznik, and Bernard Bordeleau, The Wars; David Evans, Steven Cole, Wayne Griffin, and Kenneth Heeley-Ray, A Christmas Story; Claude Langlois, Patrick Dodd, and Jean-Guy Montpetit, Maria Chapdelaine; Marcel Pothier, Just a Game (Rien qu'un jeu); John Kelly, David Evans, Wayne Griffin, Ups and Downs
Original Score	Original Song
Lewis Furey, Maria Chapdelaine; Michael Conway Baker, Deserters; Joël Bienvenue, Au clair de la lune; Karl Kobylansky, Dead Wrong; André Vincelli, A 20th Century Chocolate Cake	Bo Harwood and Bobby Pollard, "Ups & Downs" — Ups and Downs; Jimmy Bond, "Feel It" — Just a Game (Rien qu'un jeu); André Vincelli, "Talk About It" — A 20th Century Chocolate Cake
Theatrical Short	Special Awards
Ted Baryluk's Grocery — Michael Scott and Wolf Koenig; Brushstrokes — Sylvie Fefer; Snow — Stephen Zoller and Tibor Takács	Golden Reel Award: Strange Brew
