= 1983 in film =

The following is an overview of events in 1983 in film, including the highest-grossing films, award ceremonies and festivals, a list of films released and notable deaths.

== Highest-grossing films (U.S.) ==
The top ten 1983 released films by box office gross in North America are as follows:

Highest-grossing films of 1983
| Rank | Title | Distributor | Box-office gross |
|---|---|---|---|
| 1 | Return of the Jedi | 20th Century Fox | $252,583,617 |
| 2 | Terms of Endearment | Paramount | $108,423,489 |
| 3 | Flashdance | Paramount | $92,921,203 |
| 4 | Trading Places | Paramount | $90,404,800 |
| 5 | WarGames | United Artists | $79,567,667 |
| 6 | Octopussy | United Artists | $67,893,619 |
| 7 | Sudden Impact | Warner Bros. | $67,642,693 |
| 8 | Staying Alive | Paramount | $64,892,670 |
| 9 | Mr. Mom | 20th Century Fox | $64,783,827 |
| 10 | Risky Business | Warner Bros. | $63,541,777 |

== Events ==
- February 11 - The Rolling Stones concert film Let's Spend the Night Together opens in New York City.
- May 25 - Return of the Jedi, the final installment in the original Star Wars trilogy, is released. Like the previous films, it goes on to become the highest-grossing film of the year.
- Academy Award winner Nicole Kidman makes her film debut in the Australian movie Bush Christmas.
- Brainstorm, the final film of screen star Natalie Wood, is released, 2 years after her death.
- October - Frank Price resigns as president of Columbia Pictures and is replaced by Guy McElwaine.
- November 18 - A Christmas Story released to theaters to moderate success, earning about $2 million in its first weekend. By Christmas 1983, the film is no longer playing at most venues but remains in about a hundred theatres until January 1984. Gross earnings were just over $19.2 million. Over the years, the film's critical reputation would grow considerably and it is now regarded by some as one of the best films of 1983. By the late 1980s, it was already considered a classic.
- December 9 - Terms of Endearment is released to theaters. It later went on to win five awards at the 56th Academy Awards, including Best Picture.

== Awards ==
| Category/Organization | 41st Golden Globe Awards January 28, 1984 | | 37th BAFTA Awards March 25, 1984 | 56th Academy Awards April 9, 1984 |
| Category/Organization | Drama | Musical or Comedy | 37th BAFTA Awards March 25, 1984 | 56th Academy Awards April 9, 1984 |
|---|---|---|---|---|
| Best Film | Terms of Endearment | Yentl | Educating Rita | Terms of Endearment |
| Best Director | Barbra Streisand; Yentl | | Bill Forsyth; Local Hero | James L. Brooks; Terms of Endearment |
| Best Actor | Tom Courtenay; The Dresser; Robert Duvall; Tender Mercies | Michael Caine; Educating Rita | Michael Caine; Educating Rita; Dustin Hoffman; Tootsie | Robert Duvall; Tender Mercies |
| Best Actress | Shirley MacLaine; Terms of Endearment | Julie Walters; Educating Rita | | Shirley MacLaine; Terms of Endearment |
| Best Supporting Actor | Jack Nicholson; Terms of Endearment | | Denholm Elliott; Trading Places | Jack Nicholson; Terms of Endearment |
| Best Supporting Actress | Cher; Silkwood | | Jamie Lee Curtis; Trading Places | Linda Hunt; The Year of Living Dangerously |
| Best Screenplay, Adapted | James L. Brooks; Terms of Endearment | | Ruth Prawer Jhabvala; Heat and Dust | James L. Brooks; Terms of Endearment |
| Best Screenplay, Original | James L. Brooks; Terms of Endearment | | Paul D. Zimmerman; The King of Comedy | Horton Foote; Tender Mercies |
| Best Original Score | Giorgio Moroder; Flashdance | | Ryuichi Sakamoto; Merry Christmas, Mr. Lawrence | Bill Conti; The Right Stuff (film); Michel Legrand and Alan and Marilyn Bergman; Yentl |
| Best Original Song | "Flashdance... What a Feeling"; Flashdance | | "Up Where We Belong"; An Officer and a Gentleman | "Flashdance... What a Feeling"; Flashdance |
| Best Foreign Language Film | Fanny and Alexander | | Danton | Fanny and Alexander |

Palme d'Or (Cannes Film Festival):

The Ballad of Narayama (楢山節考, Narayama bushiko), directed by Shohei Imamura, Japan

Golden Lion (Venice Film Festival):

Prénom Carmen (First Name: Carmen), directed by Jean-Luc Godard,

Golden Bear (Berlin Film Festival):

Ascendancy, directed by Edward Bennett, United Kingdom
The Beehive (La Colmena), directed by Mario Camus, Spain

People's Choice Award (Toronto International Film Festival):

The Big Chill, directed by Lawrence Kasdan, United States

== 1983 films ==
=== By country/region ===
- List of American films of 1983
- List of Argentine films of 1983
- List of Australian films of 1983
- List of Bangladeshi films of 1983
- List of British films of 1983
- List of Canadian films of 1983
- List of French films of 1983
- List of Hong Kong films of 1983
- List of Indian films of 1983
  - List of Hindi films of 1983
  - List of Kannada films of 1983
  - List of Malayalam films of 1983
  - List of Marathi films of 1983
  - List of Tamil films of 1983
  - List of Telugu films of 1983
- List of Japanese films of 1983
- List of Mexican films of 1983
- List of Pakistani films of 1983
- List of South Korean films of 1983
- List of Soviet films of 1983
- List of Spanish films of 1983

=== By genre/medium ===
- List of action films of 1983
- List of animated feature films of 1983
- List of avant-garde films of 1983
- List of comedy films of 1983
- List of drama films of 1983
- List of horror films of 1983
- List of science fiction films of 1983
- List of thriller films of 1983
- List of western films of 1983

== Births ==
- January 2
  - Kate Bosworth, American actress
  - Anthony Carrigan, American actor
  - Kristen Hager, Canadian actress
- January 3 - Katie McGrath, Irish actress
- January 9 - Kerry Condon, Irish actress
- January 13 - Julian Morris, British actor
- January 16 - Marwan Kenzari, Dutch actor
- January 17 - Ryan Gage, English actor
- January 20 - Rukiya Bernard, Canadian actress and producer
- January 21 - Svetlana Khodchenkova, Russian actress
- January 24
  - Frankie Grande, American actor, singer, producer, television host and YouTube personality
  - Lee Toland Krieger, American director and screenwriter
- January 26 - Stephen Lea Sheppard, Canadian writer and former actor
- January 28 - Ángel Manuel Soto, Puerto Rican film director, producer, and screenwriter
- February 4 – Hannibal Buress, American comedian, actor, writer and producer
- February 7 - Elina Pähklimägi, Estonian actress
- February 9 - Matty Cardarople, American actor and comedian
- February 10 - Julius Onah, Nigerian-American filmmaker
- February 12 - Iko Uwais, Indonesian actor, stuntman, fight choreographer and martial artist
- February 16
  - Agyness Deyn, English actress and model
  - John Magaro, American actor
- February 18
  - Evan Jonigkeit, American actor
  - Wrenn Schmidt, American actress
- February 20
  - Jessie Mueller, American actor and singer
  - Bronson Webb, British actor
- February 21
  - Eoin Macken, Irish actor
  - Mélanie Laurent, French actress
- February 22 - Taraka Ratna, Indian actor (died 2023)
- February 23
  - Aziz Ansari, American actor, writer, producer, director and comedian
  - Emily Blunt, English actress
- February 27 - Kate Mara, American actress
- March 1 - Lupita Nyong'o, Kenyan-Mexican actress and director
- March 4 - Julieta Zylberberg, Argentine actress
- March 7
  - Greta Lee, American actress
  - Hettienne Park, American actress and writer
- March 8 - Jessie Collins, American actress
- March 9
  - Bobby Campo, American actor
  - Victor Gojcaj, Albanian-American actor
- March 10
  - Rafe Spall, English actor
  - Carrie Underwood, American singer-songwriter and actress
- March 11 - Lucy DeVito, American actress
- March 12 - Ron Funches, African-American comedian, writer, actor and voice actor
- March 14
  - Phillip Chorba, American actor
  - Johnny Flynn, British actor, musician and singer-songwriter
- March 15
  - Sean Biggerstaff, Scottish actor
  - Ricky Sekhon, English actor
- March 18 - Ivan Kolesnikov, Russian actor
- March 20 - Michael Cassidy, American actor
- March 21 - Justin McDonald, British actor
- March 29 - Ed Skrein, English actor, director, screenwriter and rapper
- March 31
  - Ashleigh Ball, Canadian singer, musician and voice actress
  - Melissa Ordway, American actress
- April 1
  - Ellen Hollman, American actress
  - Matt Lanter, American actor
- April 4
  - Eric André, American comedian, actor, writer, producer and musician
  - Amanda Righetti, American actress
- April 6 - Diora Baird, American actress and former model
- April 7 - Kyle Labine, Canadian actor
- April 8
  - Serena Reeder, American actress and screenwriter
  - Levy Tran, Vietnamese-American actress
- April 10 - Jamie Chung, American actress
- April 15 - Alice Braga, Brazilian actress and producer
- April 18 - Reeve Carney, American actor and musician
- April 19 - Victoria Yeates, English actress
- April 21 - Gugu Mbatha-Raw, British actress
- April 22 - Francis Capra, American actor
- April 27 - Ari Graynor, American actress
- April 30 - Will Jordan, Scottish film critic and YouTuber
- May 3 - Ari Magder, Canadian actor (died 2012)
- May 4
  - Brad Bufanda, American actor (died 2017)
  - Jesse Moss, Canadian actor
- May 5 - Henry Cavill, British actor
- May 6
  - Adrianne Palicki, American actress
  - Gabourey Sidibe, American actress
- May 8
  - Elyes Gabel, English actor
  - Vicky McClure, English actress
- May 11 - Holly Valance, Australian actress and singer
- May 12 - Domhnall Gleeson, Irish actor, writer, and director
- May 14 - Amber Tamblyn, American actress, writer, and director
- May 15 - Sid Makkar, Indian actor
- May 17 - Ginger Gonzaga, American comedian and actress
- May 18 - Nakamura Shichinosuke II, Japanese actor
- May 22
  - Cassie Powney, English actress
  - Connie Powney, English actress
- May 25 - Chelse Swain, American actress
- May 28 - Megalyn Echikunwoke, American actress
- June 1 - Sylvia Hoeks, Dutch actress
- June 2 - Yuliya Snigir, Russian actress and model
- June 3 - Yasmin Lee, Cambodian-American actress
- June 6 - Christian Brassington, English actor and writer
- June 10 - Leelee Sobieski, American retired actress
- June 14 - Louis Garrel, French actor and filmmaker
- June 16 - Olivia Hack, American actress
- June 17 - Kazunari Ninomiya, Japanese actor and singer-songwriter
- June 19 - Aidan Turner, Irish actor
- June 23 - Miles Fisher, American actor, comedian and musician
- June 24 - John Lloyd Cruz, Filipino actor
- June 28 - Scott Haze, American actor and filmmaker
- June 30 - Angela Sarafyan, Armenian-American actress
- July 1
  - Tanya Chisholm, American actress
  - Kyle Soller, English actor
- July 4 - Brent Bailey, American actor, director, producer and screenwriter
- July 6
  - Christine Firkins, Canadian former actress
  - Gregory Smith, Canadian actor, writer and director
- July 7 - Robert Eggers, American filmmaker
- July 8 - DeVaughn Nixon, American actor
- July 10 - Golshifteh Farahani, Iranian actress
- July 16 - Katrina Kaif British actress
- July 18 - Cara Gee, Canadian actress
- July 19 - Trai Byers, American actor
- July 20 - Martin McCann, Irish actor
- July 22 - Ricky Russert, American actor and producer
- July 23 - Olamide Faison, American actor and singer
- July 28 - Dhanush, Indian actor
- August 1 - Inga Salurand, Estonian actress
- August 3 - Mamie Gummer, American actress
- August 4
  - Nathaniel Buzolic, Australian actor
  - Greta Gerwig, American director, writer, and actress
  - Adhir Kalyan, South African actor
- August 6 - Landon Pigg, American singer-songwriter and actor
- August 7
  - Maggie Castle, Canadian actress
  - Brit Marling, American actress and screenwriter
- August 8
  - Guy Burnet, British actor
  - Trina Nishimura, American voice actress
- August 9
  - Ashley Johnson, American actress
  - Dan Levy, Canadian actor and filmmaker
- August 10 - Bonnie Piesse, Australian actress and singer-songwriter
- August 11
  - Chris Hemsworth, Australian actor
  - Tatá Werneck, Brazilian comedian, television presenter and actress
- August 14
  - Mila Kunis, American actress
  - Lamorne Morris, American actor, comedian and television personality
- August 16 - Dominik García-Lorido, American actress
- August 19 - Mike Moh, American actor and martial artist
- August 20 - Andrew Garfield, English actor
- August 22 - Elena Goode, American actress
- August 23 - Annie Ilonzeh, American actress
- August 24 - Antonio Campos, American film director
- August 29 - Jennifer Landon, American actress
- August 31 - Devan Chandler Long, American actor
- September 9 - Zoe Kazan, American actress and screenwriter
- September 20 - Olivia Grant, English actress
- September 21
  - Scott Evans, American actor
  - Maggie Grace, American actress
  - Joseph Mazzello, American actor
- September 25 - Donald Glover, American actor, singer, comedian, writer, producer and director
- September 26 - Manny Montana, American actor
- September 28 - Sarah Wright, American actress
- October 3 - Tessa Thompson, American actress
- October 4 - Vicky Krieps, Luxembourgish-German actress
- October 5
  - Jesse Eisenberg, American actor, director, producer, and writer
  - Shelby Rabara, Filipino-American actress and dancer
  - Noot Seear, Canadian actress
  - Noah Segan, American actor
- October 9 - Spencer Grammer, American actress
- October 10 - Layke Anderson, British director and former actor
- October 16 - Andrew Santino, American stand-up comedian and actor
- October 17 - Felicity Jones, English actress
- October 19 - Rebecca Ferguson, Swedish actress
- October 21 - Aaron Tveit, American actor and singer
- October 23 - Alice Fearn, British actress
- October 28 - Joe Thomas, English actor, writer and comedian
- October 29 - Johnny Lewis, American actor (died 2012)
- October 30 - Andrew Schulz, American stand-up comedian and actor
- November 7 - Adam DeVine, American actor, comedian, screenwriter, producer and singer
- November 8 - Chris Rankin, New Zealand-born British actor
- November 14 - Benjamin Renner, French animator and filmmaker
- November 15 - Sophia Di Martino, English actress
- November 17 - Harry Lloyd, English actor
- November 18 - Julia Ducournau, French film director and screenwriter
- November 19
  - Adam Driver, American actor
  - Ilya Naishuller, Russian director and musician
- November 24
  - Gwilym Lee, British actor
  - Karine Vanasse, Canadian actress
- November 28 - Emun Elliott, Scottish actor
- November 29 - Claudia O'Doherty, Australian actress, writer and comedian
- November 30 - Guillaume Gouix, French actor, director and screenwriter
- December 8 - Utkarsh Ambudkar, American actor, singer and rapper
- December 9 - Jolene Purdy, American actress
- December 10
  - Patrick Flueger, American actor
  - Xavier Samuel, Australian actor
- December 13 - Satya Bhabha, British actor
- December 17 - Stef Dawson, Australian actress
- December 20 - Jonah Hill, American actor, filmmaker, and comedian
- December 21 - Steven Yeun, American actor
- December 23
  - Eva Ceja, American actress and film producer
  - Joe Dinicol, Canadian actor

== Deaths ==
| Month | Date | Name | Age | Country | Profession | Notable films |
|---|---|---|---|---|---|---|
| January | 8 | Gale Page | 72 | US | Actress | They Drive by Night; Knute Rockne, All American |
| January | 15 | Shepperd Strudwick | 75 | US | Actor | All the King's Men; A Place in the Sun |
| January | 19 | Robert Carson | 73 | US | Screenwriter | A Star Is Born; Beau Geste |
| January | 24 | George Cukor | 83 | US | Director | The Philadelphia Story; My Fair Lady |
| January | 27 | Louis de Funès | 68 | France | Actor, Director | La Grande Vadrouille; L'avare |
| January | 28 | Billy Fury | 42 | UK | Singer, Actor | That'll Be the Day; Play It Cool |
| January | 30 | Joan Valerie | 71 | US | Actress | Blazing Sixes; Free, Blonde and 21 |
| February | 10 | Eduard Franz | 80 | US | Actor | The Ten Commandments; The Story of Ruth |
| February | 13 | Marian Nixon | 78 | US | Actress | Rebecca of Sunnybrook Farm; Winner Take All |
| February | 19 | Charles Bluhdorn | 56 | Austria | Studio Executive | |
| February | 19 | Alice White | 75 | US | Actress | The Girl from Woolworth's; Showgirl in Hollywood |
| February | 21 | Marie Mosquini | 83 | US | Actress | Short Orders; 7th Heaven |
| February | 25 | Tennessee Williams | 71 | US | Screenwriter | A Streetcar Named Desire; Cat on a Hot Tin Roof |
| February | 27 | Ruth Dunning | 71 | UK | Actress | It's a Great Day; Hoffman |
| March | 7 | Robert Bray | 65 | US | Actor | My Gun Is Quick; Bus Stop |
| March | 8 | William Walton | 80 | UK | Composer | Hamlet; Henry V |
| March | 9 | Faye Emerson | 65 | US | Actress | The Mask of Dimitrios; Nobody Lives Forever |
| March | 14 | Maurice Ronet | 55 | France | Actor | Elevator to the Gallows; Purple Noon |
| March | 16 | Arthur Godfrey | 79 | US | Actor | The Glass Bottom Boat; Where Angels Go, Trouble Follows |
| March | 27 | James Hayter | 75 | UK | Actor | Oliver!; Night and the City |
| March | 28 | Walter Reisch | 79 | Austria | Screenwriter | Gaslight; Titanic |
| April | 4 | Buster Crabbe | 75 | US | Actor | Flash Gordon; Jungle Man |
| April | 4 | Gloria Swanson | 84 | US | Actress | Sunset Boulevard; Sadie Thompson |
| April | 5 | Bronisław Kaper | 81 | Poland | Composer | Lili; Mutiny on the Bounty |
| April | 11 | Dolores del Río | 77 | Mexico | Actress | Ramona; Bird of Paradise |
| April | 15 | Rodolfo Hoyos Jr. | 67 | Mexico | Actor | The Brave One; Villa!! |
| April | 21 | Walter Slezak | 80 | Austria | Actor | Lifeboat; Ten Thousand Bedrooms |
| April | 23 | Selena Royle | 78 | US | Actress | Joan of Arc; Night and Day |
| April | 26 | Shirley Deane | 70 | US | Actress | Educating Father; Undercover Agent |
| April | 26 | Vaughn Taylor | 73 | US | Actor | Psycho; Cat on a Hot Tin Roof |
| May | 1 | Joseph Ruttenberg | 93 | Ukraine | Cinematographer | Brigadoon; Gigi |
| May | 5 | John Williams | 80 | UK | Actor | Dial M for Murder; To Catch a Thief |
| May | 8 | Fay Spain | 50 | US | Actress | Al Capone; God's Little Acre |
| May | 22 | Art Cruickshank | 68 | US | Special Effects Artist | Fantastic Voyage; The Black Hole |
| May | 23 | George Bruns | 68 | US | Composer | The Jungle Book; One Hundred and One Dalmatians |
| May | 23 | Eve Gray | 87 | UK | Actress | Murder at Monte Carlo; Midnight |
| May | 25 | Sydney Box | 78 | UK | Producer, Screenwriter | The Seventh Veil; A Girl in a Million |
| May | 28 | John C. Howard | 52 | US | Film Editor | Butch Cassidy and the Sundance Kid; Blazing Saddles |
| May | 30 | Burnett Guffey | 78 | US | Cinematographer | Bonnie and Clyde; From Here to Eternity |
| June | 12 | Norma Shearer | 80 | Canada | Actress | The Women; Marie Antoinette |
| June | 22 | David MacDonald | 79 | UK | Director | Dead Men Tell No Tales; The Moonraker |
| June | 23 | Jonathan Latimer | 76 | US | Screenwriter | The Glass Key; The Big Clock |
| June | 30 | Herbert Baker | 62 | US | Screenwriter | Dream Wife; Murderers' Row |
| July | 1 | Charles G. Clarke | 84 | US | Cinematographer | Miracle on 34th Street; Hello, Frisco, Hello |
| July | 5 | Harry James | 67 | US | Musician, Actor | Two Girls and a Sailor; The Opposite Sex |
| July | 7 | Alexander Fu Sheng | 28 | Hong Kong | Actor, Martial Artist | Chinatown Kid |
| July | 9 | Robert Dawn | 61 | US | Makeup Artist | Marnie; Black Sunday |
| July | 15 | Eddie Foy Jr. | 78 | US | Actor | Yankee Doodle Dandy; Bells Are Ringing |
| July | 16 | Samson Raphaelson | 89 | US | Screenwriter | The Shop Around the Corner; Heaven Can Wait |
| July | 17 | Byron Kennedy | 33 | Australia | Producer | Mad Max; Mad Max 2 |
| July | 20 | E. Preston Ames | 77 | US | Art Director | An American in Paris; Airport |
| July | 23 | Georges Auric | 84 | France | Composer | Roman Holiday; The Wages of Fear |
| July | 25 | Jerome Moross | 69 | US | Composer | The Big Country; Rachel, Rachel |
| July | 29 | Luis Buñuel | 83 | Spain | Screenwriter, Director, Actor | Un Chien Andalou; Belle de Jour |
| July | 29 | Raymond Massey | 86 | Canada | Actor | Arsenic and Old Lace; East of Eden |
| July | 29 | David Niven | 73 | UK | Actor | The Pink Panther; The Guns of Navarone |
| July | 30 | Lynn Fontanne | 95 | UK | Actress | The Guardsman; The Magnificent Yankee |
| August | 1 | Peter Arne | 64 | UK | Actor | Straw Dogs; Chitty Chitty Bang Bang |
| August | 3 | Carolyn Jones | 53 | US | Actress | King Creole; Last Train from Gun Hill |
| August | 5 | Judy Canova | 69 | US | Actress | Louisiana Hayride; The Adventures of Huckleberry Finn |
| August | 26 | Mike Kellin | 61 | US | Actor | Midnight Express; Sleepaway Camp |
| August | 28 | Jan Clayton | 66 | US | Actress | The Showdown; This Man's Navy |
| August | 29 | Simon Oakland | 68 | US | Actor | Psycho; West Side Story |
| September | 15 | LeRoy Prinz | 88 | US | Choreographer, Director | Show Boat; Yankee Doodle Dandy |
| September | 16 | Henry Grace | 76 | US | Set Decorator | Gigi; North by Northwest |
| September | 27 | Ben Carruthers | 47 | US | Actor | Shadows; The Dirty Dozen |
| September | 30 | William Elliott | 49 | US | Actor | Coffy; Night of the Lepus |
| October | 5 | Rafael Bertrand | 66 | Cuba | Actor | The Professionals; Isle of the Snake People |
| October | 8 | Joan Hackett | 49 | US | Actress | Only When I Laugh; The Last of Sheila |
| October | 10 | Ralph Richardson | 80 | UK | Actor, Director | Doctor Zhivago; The Heiress |
| October | 11 | William Hornbeck | 82 | US | Film Editor | A Place in the Sun; It's a Wonderful Life |
| October | 14 | Paul Fix | 82 | US | Actor | To Kill a Mockingbird; Giant |
| October | 15 | Pat O'Brien | 83 | US | Actor | Some Like It Hot; Angels with Dirty Faces |
| October | 17 | Vittorio Nino Novarese | 76 | Italy | Costume Designer | Cleopatra; Cromwell |
| October | 18 | Barbara Karinska | 97 | Ukraine | Costume Designer | Joan of Arc; Hans Christian Andersen |
| October | 22 | Paul Hardwick | 64 | UK | Actor | Romeo and Juliet; Julius Caesar |
| November | ? | Eleanore Whitney | 66 | US | Actress | Rose Bowl; Blonde Trouble |
| November | 8 | Robert Agnew | 84 | US | Actor | The Heart of Broadway; The College Hero |
| November | 15 | John Le Mesurier | 71 | UK | Actor | The Moon-Spinners; The Italian Job |
| November | 18 | Marcel Dalio | 83 | France | Actor | Sabrina; To Have and Have Not |
| November | 22 | Michael Conrad | 58 | US | Actor | The Longest Yard; They Shoot Horses, Don't They? |
| November | 28 | Johnnie Davis | 73 | US | Actor | Hollywood Hotel; Cowboy from Brooklyn |
| November | 28 | Christopher George | 52 | US | Actor | El Dorado; Midway |
| December | 2 | Fifi D'Orsay | 79 | Canada | Actress | Those Three French Girls; Going Hollywood |
| December | 5 | Robert Aldrich | 65 | US | Director | The Dirty Dozen; What Ever Happened to Baby Jane? |
| December | 8 | Slim Pickens | 64 | US | Actor | Dr. Strangelove; Blazing Saddles |
| December | 13 | Leora Dana | 60 | US | Actress | Some Came Running; 3:10 to Yuma |
| December | 17 | Hal Pereira | 78 | US | Art Director | Vertigo; Breakfast at Tiffany's |
| December | 21 | Rod Cameron | 73 | Canada | Actor | Requiem for a Gunfighter; Santa Fe Passage |
| December | 22 | Charles Lloyd-Pack | 81 | UK | Actor | if....; Dracula |
| December | 28 | William Demarest | 91 | US | Actor | Mr. Smith Goes to Washington; It's a Mad, Mad, Mad, Mad World |
| December | 29 | Janet Webb | 52 | UK | Actress | A Funny Thing Happened on the Way to the Forum; Joseph Andrews |

== Film debuts ==
- Curtis Armstrong – Risky Business
- Rowan Atkinson – Never Say Never Again
- Kathy Baker – The Right Stuff
- Steven Bauer – Scarface
- Luc Besson (director) – Le Dernier Combat
- Juliette Binoche – Liberty Belle
- Alan Blumenfeld – WarGames
- Lothaire Bluteau – Just a Game
- Eric Bogosian – Born in Flames
- Mark Boone Junior – Variety
- Matthew Broderick – Max Dugan Returns
- Clancy Brown – Bad Boys
- Ron Canada – The Man Who Wasn't There
- Jim Carrey – All in Good Taste
- Wendy Crewson – Skullduggery
- John Cusack – Class
- Lolita Davidovich – Class
- Warwick Davis – Return of the Jedi
- William B. Davis – The Dead Zone
- Vincent D'Onofrio – The First Turn-On!
- James Eckhouse – Trading Places
- Chris Elliott – Lianna
- Frances Fisher – Can She Bake a Cherry Pie?
- Matt Frewer – The Lords of Discipline
- Andy García – Blue Skies Again
- Jeff Garlin – Spring Break
- Mary Pat Gleason – Easy Money
- Crispin Glover – My Tutor
- Valeria Golino – A Joke of Destiny
- John Goodman – Eddie Macon's Run
- Kelsey Grammer – WarGames
- Graham Greene – Running Brave
- David Alan Grier – Streamers
- Lukas Haas – Testament
- Tess Harper – Tender Mercies
- Arliss Howard – The Prodigal
- James Newton Howard (film composer) – Twilight Zone: The Movie
- Jack Kehler – Strange Invaders
- Nicole Kidman – Bush Christmas
- Jane Krakowski – National Lampoon's Vacation
- Maurice LaMarche – Rock & Rule
- Al Leong – Twilight Zone: The Movie
- Ray Liotta – The Lonely Lady
- John Bedford Lloyd – Trading Places
- Rob Lowe – The Outsiders
- Virginia Madsen – Class
- Camryn Manheim – Sudden Impact
- Andrew McCarthy – Class
- Kelly McGillis – Reuben, Reuben
- Peter McRobbie – Zelig
- Julio Oscar Mechoso – Guaguasi
- Fred Melamed – Lovesick
- Matthew Modine – Baby It's You
- Rick Moranis – Strange Brew
- Megan Mullally – Risky Business
- Judd Nelson – Rock 'n' Roll Hotel
- Afemo Omilami – Trading Places
- Chazz Palminteri – Home Free All
- Michael Paré – Eddie and the Cruisers
- Sarah Jessica Parker – Somewhere Tomorrow
- Alexandra Paul – American Nightmare
- Bruce Payne – Privates on Parade
- Bronson Pinchot – Risky Business
- Larry Poindexter – Going Berserk
- Kevin Pollak – The Right Stuff
- Melvil Poupaud – City of Pirates
- Kelly Preston – 10 to Midnight
- Paul Rodriguez – D.C. Cab
- Mimi Rogers – Blue Skies Again
- Felissa Rose – Sleepaway Camp
- Alan Ruck – Bad Boys
- Julian Sands – Privates on Parade
- Ally Sheedy – Bad Boys
- Elisabeth Shue – Somewhere Tomorrow
- Kiefer Sutherland – Max Dugan Returns
- Lea Thompson – Jaws 3-D
- Lenny Von Dohlen – Tender Mercies
- J. T. Walsh – Eddie Macon's Run
- Julie Walters – Educating Rita
- Zack Ward – A Christmas Story
- Lynn Whitfield – Doctor Detroit
- Kathleen Wilhoite – Private School
- Karen Young – Handgun
