= Canadian Screen Award for Best Director =

Annual film award

- Awarded for: Excellence in film directing
- Country: Canada
- Presented by: Academy of Canadian Cinema & Television
- First award: 1966
- Currently held by: R. T. Thorne for 40 Acres (2025)
- Website: academy.ca/awards

The Academy of Canadian Cinema and Television presents an annual award for Best Achievement in Direction to the best work by a director of a Canadian film.

== History ==
The award was first presented in 1966 by the Canadian Film Awards, and was presented annually until 1978 with the exception of 1974 due to the cancellation of the awards that year. From 1980 until 2012, the award was presented as part of the Genie Awards ceremony; since 2013, it has been presented as part of the Canadian Screen Awards.

== 1960s ==
Year	Nominee	Film	Ref
1966; 18th Canadian Film Awards
1966; 18th Canadian Film Awards	Ron Kelly	The Gift	
1967; 19th Canadian Film Awards
1967; 19th Canadian Film Awards	Ron Kelly	Wojeck: "The Last Man in the World"	
1967; 19th Canadian Film Awards	Allan King	Warrendale	
1968; 20th Canadian Film Awards
1968; 20th Canadian Film Awards	Don Owen	The Ernie Game	
1969; 21st Canadian Film Awards
1969; 21st Canadian Film Awards	Peter Pearson	The Best Damn Fiddler from Calabogie to Kaladar	
1969; 21st Canadian Film Awards	Arthur Hammond	This Land	
1969; 21st Canadian Film Awards	Francis Chapman	McQueen: "There's a Car Upside Down on My Lawn"	

== 1970s ==
Year	Nominee	Film	Ref
1970; 22nd Canadian Film Awards
1970; 22nd Canadian Film Awards	Paul Almond	The Act of the Heart	
1971; 23rd Canadian Film Awards
1971; 23rd Canadian Film Awards	Claude Jutra	Mon oncle Antoine	
1972; 24th Canadian Film Awards
1972; 24th Canadian Film Awards	Gilles Carle	The True Nature of Bernadette (La Vraie Nature de Bernadette)	
1973; 25th Canadian Film Awards
1973; 25th Canadian Film Awards	David Acomba	Slipstream	
1974
1974	No award presented		
1975; 26th Canadian Film Awards
1975; 26th Canadian Film Awards	Michel Brault	Orders (Les Ordres)	
1976; 27th Canadian Film Awards
1976; 27th Canadian Film Awards	Harvey Hart	Goldenrod	
1977; 28th Canadian Film Awards
1977; 28th Canadian Film Awards	Jean Beaudin	J.A. Martin Photographer (J.A. Martin photographe)	
1977; 28th Canadian Film Awards	Allan King	Who Has Seen the Wind	
1977; 28th Canadian Film Awards	Silvio Narizzano	Why Shoot the Teacher?	
1977; 28th Canadian Film Awards	Robin Spry	One Man	
1978; 29th Canadian Film Awards
1978; 29th Canadian Film Awards	Daryl Duke	The Silent Partner	
1978; 29th Canadian Film Awards	Paul Lynch	Blood and Guts	
1978; 29th Canadian Film Awards	George Kaczender	In Praise of Older Women	
1978; 29th Canadian Film Awards	Les Rose	Three Card Monte	

== 1980s ==
Year	Nominee	Film	Ref
1980; 1st Genie Awards
1980; 1st Genie Awards	Bob Clark	Murder by Decree	
1980; 1st Genie Awards	Peter Carter	Klondike Fever	
1980; 1st Genie Awards	Anne-Claire Poirier	A Scream from Silence (Mourir à tue-tête)	
1980; 1st Genie Awards	Donald Shebib	Fish Hawk	
1980; 1st Genie Awards	Eric Till	Wild Horse Hank	
1981; 2nd Genie Awards
1981; 2nd Genie Awards	Francis Mankiewicz	Good Riddance (Les bons débarras)	
1981; 2nd Genie Awards	Bob Clark	Tribute	
1981; 2nd Genie Awards	Zale Dalen	The Hounds of Notre Dame	
1981; 2nd Genie Awards	Jean-Claude Labrecque	The Coffin Affair (L'Affaire Coffin)	
1981; 2nd Genie Awards	Micheline Lanctôt	The Handyman (L'Homme à tout faire)	
1982; 3rd Genie Awards
1982; 3rd Genie Awards	Gilles Carle	The Plouffe Family (Les Plouffe)	
1982; 3rd Genie Awards	David Cronenberg	Scanners	
1982; 3rd Genie Awards	Allan King	Silence of the North	
1982; 3rd Genie Awards	Donald Shebib	Heartaches	
1982; 3rd Genie Awards	Ralph L. Thomas	Ticket to Heaven	
1983; 4th Genie Awards
1983; 4th Genie Awards	Phillip Borsos	The Grey Fox	
1983; 4th Genie Awards	Rex Bromfield	Melanie	
1983; 4th Genie Awards	Jean Pierre Lefebvre	Wild Flowers (Les fleurs sauvages)	
1983; 4th Genie Awards	Robert Ménard	A Day in a Taxi (Une journée en taxi)	
1983; 4th Genie Awards	Eric Till	If You Could See What I Hear	
1984; 5th Genie Awards
1984; 5th Genie Awards	Bob Clark	A Christmas Story	
1984; 5th Genie Awards	David Cronenberg	Videodrome	
1984; 5th Genie Awards	Bruno Carrière	Lucien Brouillard	
1984; 5th Genie Awards	Jack Darcus	Deserters	
1984; 5th Genie Awards	André Forcier	Au clair de la lune	
1984; 5th Genie Awards	Brigitte Sauriol	Just a Game (Rien qu'un jeu)	
1985; 6th Genie Awards
1985; 6th Genie Awards	Micheline Lanctôt	Sonatine	
1985; 6th Genie Awards	Atom Egoyan	Next of Kin	
1985; 6th Genie Awards	Jean Pierre Lefebvre	Le jour S...	
1985; 6th Genie Awards	Don Owen	Unfinished Business	
1985; 6th Genie Awards	Léa Pool	A Woman in Transit (La Femme de l'hôtel)	
1986; 7th Genie Awards
1986; 7th Genie Awards	Sandy Wilson	My American Cousin	
1986; 7th Genie Awards	Jean Beaudin	The Alley Cat (Le Matou)	
1986; 7th Genie Awards	Claude Jutra	The Dame in Colour (La Dame en couleurs)	
1986; 7th Genie Awards	Ted Kotcheff	Joshua Then and Now	
1986; 7th Genie Awards	Giles Walker	90 Days	
1987; 8th Genie Awards
1987; 8th Genie Awards	Denys Arcand	The Decline of the American Empire (Le Déclin de l'empire américain)	
1987; 8th Genie Awards	Leon Marr	Dancing in the Dark	
1987; 8th Genie Awards	Yves Simoneau	Intimate Power (Pouvoir intime)	
1987; 8th Genie Awards	John N. Smith	Sitting in Limbo	
1987; 8th Genie Awards	Anne Wheeler	Loyalties	
1988; 9th Genie Awards
1988; 9th Genie Awards	Jean-Claude Lauzon	Night Zoo (Un zoo la nuit)	
1988; 9th Genie Awards	Atom Egoyan	Family Viewing	
1988; 9th Genie Awards	Marquise Lepage	Marie in the City (Marie s'en va-t-en ville)	
1988; 9th Genie Awards	Patricia Rozema	I've Heard the Mermaids Singing	
1988; 9th Genie Awards	John N. Smith	Train of Dreams	
1989; 10th Genie Awards
1989; 10th Genie Awards	David Cronenberg	Dead Ringers	
1989; 10th Genie Awards	Roger Cardinal	Malarek	
1989; 10th Genie Awards	Louise Clark, Jackie Burroughs, John Walker, Aerlyn Weissman and John Frizzell	A Winter Tan	
1989; 10th Genie Awards	Francis Mankiewicz	The Revolving Doors (Les Portes tournantes)	
1989; 10th Genie Awards	Anne Wheeler	Cowboys Don't Cry	

== 1990s ==
Year	Nominee	Film	Ref
1990; 11th Genie Awards
1990; 11th Genie Awards	Denys Arcand	Jesus of Montreal (Jésus de Montréal)	
1990; 11th Genie Awards	François Bouvier and Jean Beaudry	Unfaithful Mornings (Les Matins infidèles)	
1990; 11th Genie Awards	Atom Egoyan	Speaking Parts	
1990; 11th Genie Awards	John N. Smith	Welcome to Canada	
1990; 11th Genie Awards	Anne Wheeler	Bye Bye Blues	
1991; 12th Genie Awards
1991; 12th Genie Awards	Bruce Beresford	Black Robe	
1991; 12th Genie Awards	Phillip Borsos	Bethune: The Making of a Hero	
1991; 12th Genie Awards	Atom Egoyan	The Adjuster	
1991; 12th Genie Awards	André Forcier	An Imaginary Tale (Une histoire inventée)	
1991; 12th Genie Awards	Darrell Wasyk	H	
1992; 13th Genie Awards
1992; 13th Genie Awards	David Cronenberg	Naked Lunch	
1992; 13th Genie Awards	Jean Beaudin	Being at Home with Claude	
1992; 13th Genie Awards	Eli Cohen	The Quarrel	
1992; 13th Genie Awards	Jean-Claude Lauzon	Léolo	
1992; 13th Genie Awards	Robert Morin	Requiem for a Handsome Bastard (Requiem pour un beau sans-cœur)	
1993; 14th Genie Awards
1993; 14th Genie Awards	François Girard	Thirty Two Short Films About Glenn Gould	
1993; 14th Genie Awards	Paule Baillargeon	The Sex of the Stars (Le Sexe des étoiles)	
1993; 14th Genie Awards	Atom Egoyan	Calendar	
1993; 14th Genie Awards	George Mihalka	La Florida	
1993; 14th Genie Awards	Sandy Wilson	Harmony Cats	
1994; 15th Genie Awards
1994; 15th Genie Awards	Atom Egoyan	Exotica	
1994; 15th Genie Awards	André Forcier	The Wind from Wyoming (Le Vent du Wyoming)	
1994; 15th Genie Awards	Micheline Lanctôt	Two Can Play (Deux actrices)	
1994; 15th Genie Awards	Richard J. Lewis	Whale Music	
1994; 15th Genie Awards	Léa Pool	Desire in Motion (Mouvements du désir)	
1994; 15th Genie Awards	Mina Shum	Double Happiness	
1995; 16th Genie Awards
1995; 16th Genie Awards	Robert Lepage	The Confessional (Le Confessionnal)	
1995; 16th Genie Awards	Charles Binamé	Eldorado	
1995; 16th Genie Awards	Mort Ransen	Margaret's Museum	
1995; 16th Genie Awards	Jean-Marc Vallée	Black List (Liste noire)	
1995; 16th Genie Awards	Clement Virgo	Rude	
1996; 17th Genie Awards
1996; 17th Genie Awards	David Cronenberg	Crash	
1996; 17th Genie Awards	John Fawcett	The Boys Club	
1996; 17th Genie Awards	John Greyson	Lilies	
1996; 17th Genie Awards	Robert Lepage	Polygraph (Le Polygraphe)	
1996; 17th Genie Awards	Bruce McDonald	Hard Core Logo	
1997; 18th Genie Awards
1997; 18th Genie Awards	Atom Egoyan	The Sweet Hereafter	
1997; 18th Genie Awards	Thom Fitzgerald	The Hanging Garden	
1997; 18th Genie Awards	André Forcier	The Countess of Baton Rouge (La Comtesse de Bâton Rouge)	
1997; 18th Genie Awards	Gabriel Pelletier	Karmina	
1997; 18th Genie Awards	Lynne Stopkewich	Kissed	
1998; 19th Genie Awards
1998; 19th Genie Awards	François Girard	The Red Violin (Le Violon rouge)	
1998; 19th Genie Awards	Sturla Gunnarsson	Such a Long Journey	
1998; 19th Genie Awards	Don McKellar	Last Night	
1998; 19th Genie Awards	Gillies MacKinnon	Regeneration	
1998; 19th Genie Awards	Jonathan Tammuz	Rupert's Land	
1998; 19th Genie Awards	Joel Wyner	Pale Saints	
1999; 20th Genie Awards
1999; 20th Genie Awards	Jeremy Podeswa	The Five Senses	
1999; 20th Genie Awards	Louis Bélanger	Post Mortem	
1999; 20th Genie Awards	Atom Egoyan	Felicia's Journey	
1999; 20th Genie Awards	Léa Pool	Set Me Free (Emporte-moi)	
1999; 20th Genie Awards	Istvan Szabo	Sunshine	

== 2000s ==
Year	Nominee	Film	Ref
2000; 21st Genie Awards
2000; 21st Genie Awards	Denis Villeneuve	Maelström	
2000; 21st Genie Awards	Gary Burns	waydowntown	
2000; 21st Genie Awards	Alain DesRochers	The Bottle (La Bouteille)	
2000; 21st Genie Awards	Robert Favreau	The Orphan Muses (Les Muses orphelines)	
2000; 21st Genie Awards	Robert Lepage	Possible Worlds	
2001; 22nd Genie Awards
2001; 22nd Genie Awards	Zacharias Kunuk	Atanarjuat: The Fast Runner	
2001; 22nd Genie Awards	Denis Chouinard	Tar Angel (L'Ange de goudron)	
2001; 22nd Genie Awards	Renny Bartlett	Eisenstein	
2001; 22nd Genie Awards	Bernard Émond	The Woman Who Drinks (La Femme qui boit)	
2001; 22nd Genie Awards	William Phillips	Treed Murray	
2002; 23rd Genie Awards
2002; 23rd Genie Awards	David Cronenberg	Spider	
2002; 23rd Genie Awards	Jean Beaudin	The Collector (Le Collectionneur)	
2002; 23rd Genie Awards	Sturla Gunnarsson	Rare Birds	
2002; 23rd Genie Awards	Ricardo Trogi	Québec-Montréal	
2002; 23rd Genie Awards	Anne Wheeler	Suddenly Naked	
2003; 24th Genie Awards
2003; 24th Genie Awards	Denys Arcand	The Barbarian Invasions (Les Invasions barbares)	
2003; 24th Genie Awards	Robert Lepage	Far Side of the Moon (La Face cachée de la lune)	
2003; 24th Genie Awards	Guy Maddin	The Saddest Music in the World	
2003; 24th Genie Awards	Jean-François Pouliot	Seducing Doctor Lewis (La Grande séduction)	
2003; 24th Genie Awards	Charles Martin Smith	The Snow Walker	
2004; 25th Genie Awards
2004; 25th Genie Awards	Francis Leclerc	Looking for Alexander (Mémoires affectives)	
2004; 25th Genie Awards	Denise Filiatrault	Bittersweet Memories (Ma vie en cinémascope)	
2004; 25th Genie Awards	Pierre Houle	Machine Gun Molly (Monica la mitraille)	
2004; 25th Genie Awards	Bronwen Hughes	Stander	
2004; 25th Genie Awards	David "Sudz" Sutherland	Love, Sex and Eating the Bones	
2005; 26th Genie Awards
2005; 26th Genie Awards	Jean-Marc Vallée	C.R.A.Z.Y.	
2005; 26th Genie Awards	Louise Archambault	Familia	
2005; 26th Genie Awards	Michael Dowse	It's All Gone Pete Tong	
2005; 26th Genie Awards	Deepa Mehta	Water	
2005; 26th Genie Awards	Luc Picard	Audition (L'Audition)	
2006; 27th Genie Awards
2006; 27th Genie Awards	Charles Binamé	The Rocket (Maurice Richard)	
2006; 27th Genie Awards	Érik Canuel	Bon Cop, Bad Cop	
2006; 27th Genie Awards	Robert Favreau	A Sunday in Kigali (Un dimanche à Kigali)	
2006; 27th Genie Awards	Stéphane Lapointe	The Secret Life of Happy People (La Vie secrète des gens heureux)	
2006; 27th Genie Awards	Jean-François Pouliot	The Little Book of Revenge (Guide de la petite vengeance)	
2007; 28th Genie Awards
2007; 28th Genie Awards	Sarah Polley	Away From Her	
2007; 28th Genie Awards	Denys Arcand	Days of Darkness (L'Âge des ténèbres)	
2007; 28th Genie Awards	David Cronenberg	Eastern Promises	
2007; 28th Genie Awards	Bruce McDonald	The Tracey Fragments	
2007; 28th Genie Awards	Roger Spottiswoode	Shake Hands With the Devil	
2008; 29th Genie Awards
2008; 29th Genie Awards	Benoît Pilon	The Necessities of Life (Ce qu'il faut pour vivre)	
2008; 29th Genie Awards	Carl Bessai	Normal	
2008; 29th Genie Awards	Lyne Charlebois	Borderline	
2008; 29th Genie Awards	Yves-Christian Fournier	Everything is Fine (Tout est parfait)	
2008; 29th Genie Awards	Richie Mehta	Amal	
2009; 30th Genie Awards
2009; 30th Genie Awards	Denis Villeneuve	Polytechnique	
2009; 30th Genie Awards	Marie-Hélène Cousineau and Madeline Ivalu	Before Tomorrow (Le Jour avant le lendemain)	
2009; 30th Genie Awards	Bruce McDonald	Pontypool	
2009; 30th Genie Awards	Charles Officer	Nurse.Fighter.Boy	
2009; 30th Genie Awards	Kari Skogland	Fifty Dead Men Walking	

== 2010s ==
Year	Nominee	Film	Ref
2010; 31st Genie Awards
2010; 31st Genie Awards	Denis Villeneuve	Incendies	
2010; 31st Genie Awards	Xavier Dolan	Heartbeats (Les Amours imaginaires)	
2010; 31st Genie Awards	Richard J. Lewis	Barney's Version	
2010; 31st Genie Awards	Vincenzo Natali	Splice	
2010; 31st Genie Awards	Podz	10½	
2011; 32nd Genie Awards
2011; 32nd Genie Awards	Philippe Falardeau	Monsieur Lazhar	
2011; 32nd Genie Awards	David Cronenberg	A Dangerous Method	
2011; 32nd Genie Awards	Larysa Kondracki	The Whistleblower	
2011; 32nd Genie Awards	Steven Silver	The Bang Bang Club	
2011; 32nd Genie Awards	Jean-Marc Vallée	Café de Flore	
2012; 1st Canadian Screen Awards
2012; 1st Canadian Screen Awards	Kim Nguyen	War Witch (Rebelle)	
2012; 1st Canadian Screen Awards	Xavier Dolan	Laurence Anyways	
2012; 1st Canadian Screen Awards	Michael Dowse	Goon	
2012; 1st Canadian Screen Awards	Bernard Émond	All That You Possess (Tout ce que tu possèdes)	
2012; 1st Canadian Screen Awards	Deepa Mehta	Midnight's Children	
2013; 2nd Canadian Screen Awards
2013; 2nd Canadian Screen Awards	Denis Villeneuve	Enemy	
2013; 2nd Canadian Screen Awards	Xavier Dolan	Tom at the Farm (Tom à la ferme)	
2013; 2nd Canadian Screen Awards	Michael Dowse	The F Word	
2013; 2nd Canadian Screen Awards	Sébastien Pilote	The Dismantling (Le Démantèlement)	
2013; 2nd Canadian Screen Awards	Pedro Pires and Robert Lepage	Triptych (Triptyque)	
2014; 3rd Canadian Screen Awards
2014; 3rd Canadian Screen Awards	Xavier Dolan	Mommy	
2014; 3rd Canadian Screen Awards	David Cronenberg	Maps to the Stars	
2014; 3rd Canadian Screen Awards	Atom Egoyan	The Captive	
2014; 3rd Canadian Screen Awards	Stéphane Lafleur	You're Sleeping Nicole (Tu dors Nicole)	
2014; 3rd Canadian Screen Awards	Albert Shin	In Her Place	
2015; 4th Canadian Screen Awards
2015; 4th Canadian Screen Awards	Lenny Abrahamson	Room	
2015; 4th Canadian Screen Awards	Andrew Cividino	Sleeping Giant	
2015; 4th Canadian Screen Awards	Anne Émond	Our Loved Ones (Les Êtres chers)	
2015; 4th Canadian Screen Awards	Maxime Giroux	Felix and Meira (Félix et Meira)	
2015; 4th Canadian Screen Awards	Philippe Lesage	The Demons (Les Démons)	
2016; 5th Canadian Screen Awards
2016; 5th Canadian Screen Awards	Xavier Dolan	It's Only the End of the World (Juste la fin du monde)	
2016; 5th Canadian Screen Awards	Mathieu Denis and Simon Lavoie	Those Who Make Revolution Halfway Only Dig Their Own Graves (Ceux qui font les révolutions à moitié n'ont fait que se creuser un tombeau)	
2016; 5th Canadian Screen Awards	Kevan Funk	Hello Destroyer	
2016; 5th Canadian Screen Awards	Matt Johnson	Operation Avalanche	
2016; 5th Canadian Screen Awards	Chloé Leriche	Before the Streets (Avant les rues)	
2017; 6th Canadian Screen Awards
2017; 6th Canadian Screen Awards	Aisling Walsh	Maudie	
2017; 6th Canadian Screen Awards	Robin Aubert	Ravenous (Les Affamés)	
2017; 6th Canadian Screen Awards	Alexis Durand-Brault	It's the Heart That Dies Last (C'est le cœur qui meurt en dernier)	
2017; 6th Canadian Screen Awards	Sadaf Foroughi	Ava	
2017; 6th Canadian Screen Awards	Ian Lagarde	All You Can Eat Buddha	
2018; 7th Canadian Screen Awards
2018; 7th Canadian Screen Awards	Jasmin Mozaffari	Firecrackers	
2018; 7th Canadian Screen Awards	Sophie Dupuis	Family First (Chien de garde)	
2018; 7th Canadian Screen Awards	Geneviève Dulude-De Celles	A Colony (Une colonie)	
2018; 7th Canadian Screen Awards	Maxime Giroux	The Great Darkened Days (La grande noirceur)	
2018; 7th Canadian Screen Awards	Daniel Roby	Just a Breath Away (Dans la brume)	
2019; 8th Canadian Screen Awards
2019; 8th Canadian Screen Awards	Elle-Máijá Tailfeathers, Kathleen Hepburn	The Body Remembers When the World Broke Open	
2019; 8th Canadian Screen Awards	Sophie Deraspe	Antigone	
2019; 8th Canadian Screen Awards	Kazik Radwanski	Anne at 13,000 Ft.	
2019; 8th Canadian Screen Awards	Matthew Rankin	The Twentieth Century	
2019; 8th Canadian Screen Awards	Calvin Thomas, Yonah Lewis	White Lie	

== 2020s ==
Year	Nominee	Film	Ref
2020; 9th Canadian Screen Awards
2020; 9th Canadian Screen Awards	Deepa Mehta	Funny Boy	
2020; 9th Canadian Screen Awards	Brandon Cronenberg	Possessor	
2020; 9th Canadian Screen Awards	Sophie Dupuis	Underground (Souterrain)	
2020; 9th Canadian Screen Awards	Sean Durkin	The Nest	
2020; 9th Canadian Screen Awards	Pascal Plante	Nadia, Butterfly	
2021; 10th Canadian Screen Awards
2021; 10th Canadian Screen Awards	Shasha Nakhai, Rich Williamson	Scarborough	
2021; 10th Canadian Screen Awards	Anthony Scott Burns	Come True	
2021; 10th Canadian Screen Awards	Danis Goulet	Night Raiders	
2021; 10th Canadian Screen Awards	Philippe Grégoire	The Noise of Engines (Le Bruit des moteurs)	
2021; 10th Canadian Screen Awards	Bretten Hannam	Wildhood	
2022; 11th Canadian Screen Awards
2022; 11th Canadian Screen Awards	Clement Virgo	Brother	
2022; 11th Canadian Screen Awards	David Cronenberg	Crimes of the Future	
2022; 11th Canadian Screen Awards	Stéphane Lafleur	Viking	
2022; 11th Canadian Screen Awards	Charlotte Le Bon	Falcon Lake	
2022; 11th Canadian Screen Awards	Anthony Shim	Riceboy Sleeps	
2023; 12th Canadian Screen Awards
2023; 12th Canadian Screen Awards	Matt Johnson	BlackBerry	
2023; 12th Canadian Screen Awards	Brandon Cronenberg	Infinity Pool	
2023; 12th Canadian Screen Awards	Sophie Dupuis	Solo	
2023; 12th Canadian Screen Awards	Ariane Louis-Seize	Humanist Vampire Seeking Consenting Suicidal Person (Vampire humaniste cherche suicidaire consentant)	
2023; 12th Canadian Screen Awards	Henri Pardo	Kanaval	
2023; 12th Canadian Screen Awards	Pascal Plante	Red Rooms (Les Chambres rouges)	
2024; 13th Canadian Screen Awards
2024; 13th Canadian Screen Awards	Matthew Rankin	Universal Language (Une langue universelle)	
2024; 13th Canadian Screen Awards	Ara Ball	Hurricane Boy Fuck You Tabarnak! (L'Ouragan F.Y.T.)	
2024; 13th Canadian Screen Awards	Henry Bernadet	Gamma Rays (Les Rayons gammma)	
2024; 13th Canadian Screen Awards	Atom Egoyan	Seven Veils	
2024; 13th Canadian Screen Awards	Naomi Jaye	Darkest Miriam	
2024; 13th Canadian Screen Awards	Meryam Joobeur	Who Do I Belong To	
2025; 14th Canadian Screen Awards
2025; 14th Canadian Screen Awards	R. T. Thorne	40 Acres	
2025; 14th Canadian Screen Awards	Éric K. Boulianne	Follies (Folichonneries)	
2025; 14th Canadian Screen Awards	Alireza Khatami	The Things You Kill	
2025; 14th Canadian Screen Awards	Zacharias Kunuk	Wrong Husband (Uiksaringitara)	
2025; 14th Canadian Screen Awards	Sophy Romvari	Blue Heron	
2025; 14th Canadian Screen Awards	Heather Young	There, There	

== Directors with multiple wins ==
- David Cronenberg-5
- Denis Villeneuve-4
- Denys Arcand-3
- Gilles Carle-2
- Bob Clark-2
- Xavier Dolan-2
- Atom Egoyan-2
- François Girard-2
- Ron Kelly-2

== Directors with multiple nominations ==
- David Cronenberg-10 times (5 wins; tie with Bob Clark)
- Atom Egoyan-10 times (2 wins)
- Xavier Dolan-5 times (2 wins)
- Robert Lepage-5 times (1 win; co-nomination with Pedro Pires)
- Denis Villeneuve-4 times (4 wins)
- Denys Arcand-4 times (3 wins)
- Jean Beaudin-4 times (1 win)
- André Forcier-4 times (0 wins)
- Anne Wheeler-4 times (0 wins)
- Bob Clark-3 times (2 wins; tie with David Cronenberg)
- Allan King-3 times (1 win; tie with Ron Kelly)
- Micheline Lanctôt-3 times (1 win)
- Deepa Mehta-3 times (1 win)
- Jean-Marc Vallée-3 times (1 win)
- Michael Dowse-3 times (0 wins)
- Sophie Dupuis-3 times (0 wins)
- Bruce McDonald-3 times (0 wins)
- Léa Pool-3 times (0 wins)
- John N. Smith-3 times (0 wins)
- Gilles Carle-2 times (2 wins)
- Ron Kelly-2 times (2 wins; tie with Allan King)
- François Girard-2 times (2 wins)
- Charles Binamé-2 times (1 win)
- Phillip Borsos-2 times (1 win)
- Matt Johnson-2 times (1 win)
- Claude Jutra-2 times (1 win)
- Zacharias Kunuk-2 times (1 win)
- Jean-Claude Lauzon-2 times (1 win)
- Francis Mankiewicz-2 times (1 win)
- Don Owen-2 times (1 win)
- Matthew Rankin-2 times (1 win)
- Clement Virgo-2 times (1 win)
- Sandy Wilson-2 times (1 win)
- Brandon Cronenberg-2 times (0 wins)
- Bernard Émond-2 times (0 wins)
- Robert Favreau-2 times (0 wins)
- Maxime Giroux-2 times (0 wins)
- Sturla Gunnarsson-2 times (0 wins)
- Stéphane Lafleur-2 times (0 wins)
- Jean Pierre Lefebvre-2 times (0 wins)
- Richard J. Lewis-2 times (0 wins)
- Pascal Plante-2 times (0 wins)
- Jean-François Pouliot-2 times (0 wins)
- Donald Shebib-2 times (0 wins)
- Eric Till-2 times (0 wins)

== See also ==
- Prix Iris for Best Director
