= Joan Almond =

American photographer (1935–2021)

Joan (Harwood Elkins) Almond
- Born: Joan Harwood; June 3, 1935; Los Angeles, California
- Died: August 28, 2021 (aged 86)
- Occupation: Photographer
- Notable work: Specializes in black-and-white photography and printing all her own prints by platinum process.
- Spouses: George Elkins, Jr. (m. 1954; died 1969) Paul Almond (m. 1976; died 2015)
- Children: 4
- Relatives: Bo Harwood (brother)
- Website: www.joanalmond.com

Joan Almond (June 3, 1935 – August 28, 2021) was an American photographer, exhibiting since 1987.

== Career ==
Almond was a photographer for John Cassavetes' 3 Plays of Love & Hate and was also involved in many of Cassavetes' projects that her brother, Bo Harwood, was involved in. Almond was an archival photographer for Charles Kiselyak's book and film A Constant Forge (2000) about the 3 Plays of Love & Hate and Cassavetes' life.

The first exhibition of Almond's black-and-white photos was a collection of 55 photos, Jerusalem: The Gathering of Nations (1987), presented at the Saidye Bronfman Centre in Montreal. The photos in this show were selected from the over 10,000 photos (b/w and color) Almond had taken while on a photo assignment for the architect, Moshe Safdie for his book The Harvard Jerusalem Studio. Saidye had hired a team as part of a large urban design project in Jerusalem and approximately 150 of Almond's photos were selected to illustrate this book.

In 1998, the Canadian Photography Institute of the National Gallery of Canada purchased eight of Almond's platinum and palladium photographic prints: Shadows and Shoes, Tinehir, Morocco (1985); A Room of her Own, Darman, India (1996); Tiger Beware, Udaipur, India (1996); Cool Passage, Farafra, Egypt (1987); Kitchen, Farafra, Egypt (1987); Algerian Villager, Bousaanda, Algeria (1985); Main Street, Mersa Matruk, Egypt (1991) Water Carriers and Donkey, Saqqara, Egypt (1987) for the national collection:. This collection of Almond's prints were presented in Platinum (1999) at the Canadian Museum of Contemporary Photography along with seven other artists: Ginette Bouchard, Patrick Close, Tony Hauser, Stephen Livick, Bruce Monk, Gerald Pisarzowski, Elizabeth Siegfried. Platinum became one of the Canadian Museum of Contemporary Photography's Travelling Exhibitions presented at The Station Gallery in Ontario in 2002.

Almond's black and white photos, collectively titled Le Passé Dans le Present (1999), were presented at the Galerie Mistral in Montreal, Canada. This show was the culmination of over two decades of photos taken by Almond, capturing her explorations of various locations. Henry Lehmann states in The Gazette article, "While some of Almond's pictures are intentionally devoid of depth, transforming life into geometric abstraction, others delve into deep space, but ultimately arrive at the same patterned effect."

A selection of Almond's photographs from 1976 to 1996, including images taken during her travels to Morocco, Algeria, Jerusalem, Egypt and India, were included in her book Joan Almond: The Past in the Present (2002). Susan Scafati stated in an article in Women In Photography that: "Her images together read more like a diary, filled with visions of personal encounters and private lives. Through her patient pursuit of natural moments, an intimacy unveils, blurring the borders between outsider and native."

== Collections ==
- National Gallery of Canada

== Books and catalogs ==
- Joan Almond: The Past in the Present (1997) Catalog
- Joan Almond: The Past in the Present (2002) ISBN 0967174481

== Select exhibitions ==
- Jerusalem: The Gathering of Nations, Saidye Bronfman Centre, Montreal-Canada (1987)
- Armenians of the Holy Land, Tekeyan Armenian Cultural Centre, Montreal-Canada (1988)
- Joan Almond: In Platinum/Palladium, Rose Gallery at Bergamot Station Arts Centre, Santa Monica-USA (1997)
- 2000 PLATINUM, National Gallery of Canada – Canadian Museum of Contemporary Photography, Ottawa, Canada (1999)
- The Past in the Present (Le Passé Dans le Present), Platinum Prints, Mistral Gallery (Gallerie Mistral), Montreal-Canada (1999)
- Platinum/Platine, The Station Gallery, Whitby-Canada (2002)
- The Past in the Present, June Bateman Gallery, New York City-USA (2003)
- The Noble Metals: Platinum & Palladium, International Photography Hall of Fame and Museum, Oklahoma City-USA (2005)

== Personal life ==
Almond was married to her first husband George Elkins, Jr. from 1954 until his death in 1969. She took up photography in the 1970s as a hobby. In 1976, Almond married her second husband Paul Almond, the Canadian filmmaker and became a stills photographer for his films: Ups & Downs (1983), Captive Hearts (1987) and The Dance Goes On (1992). She was married to him until his death in 2015.
