= Eric Fryer =

Eric Fryer may refer to:

- Eric Fryer (actor), Canadian actor
- Eric Fryer (baseball) (born 1985), American baseball catcher
