= Overnight (1985 film) =

1985 film by Jack Darcus

- Directed by: Jack Darcus
- Written by: Jack Darcus
- Produced by: Don Haig; Hank Leis; Jack Darcus; John Board
- Starring: Eric Keenleyside; Melissa Bell; Duncan Fraser; Tedde Moore; Victor Ertmanis; Gale Garnett; Alan Scarfe
- Cinematography: Brian R. R. Hebb
- Edited by: Sally Paterson
- Music by: Michael Conway Baker; Glenn Morley
- Production company: Exile Productions
- Release date: 1985
- Running time: 96 minutes
- Country: Canada
- Language: English

Overnight is a Canadian comedy film, directed by Jack Darcus and released in 1985.

The film stars Victor Ertmanis as Scott, a struggling actor who is cast by producer Arthur (Duncan Fraser) in a new film by Vladimir Jezda (Alan Scarfe), a pretentious director from Czechoslovakia. The catch is that it's a pornographic film opposite porn star Del Dukakis (Gale Garnett), in which he is slated to play a sex robot who suffers from erectile dysfunction opposite Del's Countess Sexcula.

The cast also includes Melissa Bell as Adrienne, Tedde Moore as Leslie, Eric Keenleyside as Ernst, Barbara Gordon as Alison, Patrick Brymer as Miller and Cynthia Kereluk as Patsy.

== Awards ==
The film received four Genie Award nominations at the 7th Genie Awards in 1986:

- Best Actor (Alan Scarfe)
- Best Supporting Actor (Duncan Fraser)
- Best Supporting Actress (Barbara Gordon)
- Best Editing (Sally Paterson)
