= Claire Mackay =

Canadian children's writer

- Born: Claire Lorraine Bacchus; December 21, 1930
- Died: August 11, 2013 (aged 82)
- Occupation: author

Claire Mackay (December 21, 1930 - August 11, 2013) was a Canadian writer of eleven books for children and young-adult fiction and non-fiction.

== Early life and education ==
Mackay was born Claire Lorraine Bacchus. She was raised in Toronto, Ontario. Mackay received a scholarship to the University of Toronto, where she earned an honors BA in Political Science.

== Career ==
Mackay began her writing career by writing newsletter, newspaper and magazine articles. She was motivated to write her first children's book when she found that there was a lack of books about mini-bikes for her son to read. She wrote Mini-Bike Hero in 1974, which was published by Scholastic Canada. The book sold more than 450,00 copies. Mackay wrote two more related books, Mini-Bike Race and Mini-Bike Rescue.

Mackay was one of the eleven co-founders of the Canadian Society of Children's Authors, Illustrators and Performers (CANSCAIP).

Mackay's work has been published by Annick Press, Kids Can Press, James Lorimer, Scholastic Canada, and Tundra Books.

== Personal ==
While at the University of Toronto, Claire met Jackson Mackay, an engineering student and later a chemical engineer for Imperial Oil. They married in 1952 and had three sons. The family moved several times to accommodate Jack's work, living in Vancouver, Regina, and Sarnia, before finally settling in Toronto, Ontario.

Claire Mackay died on August 11, 2013, at the age of 82 from cancer.

== Awards ==
In 1982 Mackay and co-author Marsha Hewitt received the Ruth Schwartz Award for their Young Adult novel One Proud Summer (Women's Press). In 1983 she received the Vicki Metcalf Award, presented for an outstanding body of work in children's literature, and in 1988 for Marvin and Me and the Flies.

== Bibliography ==
- Mini-Bike Hero 1974
- Mini-Bike Racer 1976
- Exit Barney McGee 1979
- Mini-Bike Rescue 1982
- The Minerva Program 1984
- Marvin and Me and the Flies in Canadian children's annual, 12 1987
- Pay Cheques and Picket Lines: All About Unions in Canada 1987
- The Toronto Story 1990
- Touching all the Bases: Baseball for Kids of All Ages 1994
- First Folks and Vile Voyageurs 2001

== Co-authored books ==
- One Proud Summer Hewitt, Marsha, and Mackay, Claire 1981
- Bats About Baseball Little, Jean, and Mackay, Claire 1985
