= Alex Diakun =

Canadian actor

- Born: Rycroft, Alberta, Canada
- Occupation: Actor
- Years active: 1971–present

Alex Diakun is a Canadian actor.

== Career ==
Diakun's credits include a blue-faced alien (Chief Technical Director Hohne) in the series Andromeda, The Outer Limits, and the feature film Valentine.

== Filmography ==
=== Film ===
- McCabe & Mrs. Miller (1971) – Townsperson #7
- Huckleberry Finn and His Friends (1979) – Indian Joe
- Firebird 2015 AD (1981) – Dolan
- Blood Link (1982) – Mr. Adams
- Hellogoodbye (1982)
- Utilities (1983) – Lavallee
- Dead Wrong (1983) – The Stranger
- The Journey of Natty Gann (1985) – Station Master
- Rainbow War (1985)
- High Stakes (1986) – Valenta
- Malone (1987) – Madrid
- Friday the 13th Part VIII: Jason Takes Manhattan (1989) – Deck Hand
- Run (1991) – Casino Maitre D'
- The Hitman (1991) – Armone
- Knight Moves (1992) – Grandmaster Lutz
- The Portrait (1992) – Fraser
- Harmony Cats (1993) – Art Kale
- Double, Double, Toil and Trouble (1993) – Doorman
- Ernest Rides Again (1993) – Librarian
- Crackerjack (1994) – Kraft
- Exquisite Tenderness (1995) – County General Doctor
- Gunfighter's Moon (1995) – Reverend Clinton
- Crying Freeman (1995) – Antonio Rossi
- Starlight (1996) – Pallas
- Drive, She Said (1997) – The Prophecy
- Wrongfully Accused (1998)
- Hoods (1998) – Roman
- The Proposal (2001) – Jimmy
- Valentine (2001) – Pastor
- Agent Cody Banks (2003) – Intelligence Agent
- National Lampoon's Barely Legal a.k.a. After School Special (2003) – Russ
- Arbor Vitae (2003) – Janitor
- Jiminy Glick in Lalawood (2004) – Bellhop / Barber
- The X-Files: I Want to Believe (2008) – Gaunt Man
- Poe: Last Days of the Raven (2008) – Joseph Snodgrass
- Frankie & Alice (2010) – Hal
- Locked in a Garage Band (2012) – Mr. Kaminski
- Eadweard (2015) – Press Photographer Phil

=== Television ===
- Huckleberry Finn and His Friends (1980) – Indian Joe
- The Glitter Dome (1984) – Weasel
- Love Is Never Silent (1985) – Funeral Director
- Perry Mason The Case of the Notorious Nun (1986)
- A Masterpiece of Murder (1986)
- After the Promise (1987) – Foreman
- The Red Spider (1988) – Harold
- Dirty Work (1992) – Peter
- Mortal Sins (1992) – Brother Anthony
- The X-Files (1995-1996, 2016, 2018) – Manager / Dr. Fingers / Tarot Dealer / Curator / The Devil or Alien bartender
- The Outer Limits (1995–2002, various episodes) – Nicholas Prentice / Shopkeeper / Moses Saxon / Mr. Wilkes / Father Claridge / Quasga / Minister
- Johnny's Girl (1995) – Joe Gimble
- Dead Man's Gun (1997) – Crandall (segment "Fool's Gold")
- Intensity (1997) – Mr. John Q. Citizen
- Millennium (1997, 1998) – Greb / Dr. Ephraim Fabricant
- Stargate SG-1(Episode 6.20: "Memento") (2003) – Tarek Solamon
- Da Vinci's Inquest (1998–2005) – Chick Savoy
- Andromeda (2000–2005) – Höhne
- Earthsea (2004) – Thorvald
- Intelligence (2005) – Boat Mechanic
- Da Vinci's City Hall (2005–2006) – Det. Chick Savoy
- Alice (2009) – Rat Catcher
- Tower Prep (2010)
- The Boy Who Cried Werewolf (2010) – Igor Van Helman Stanisklavsky
- Supernatural (2006, 2012, in 1x12: Faith, 8x02: What's Up Tiger Mommy?) – The Reaper / Mr. Vili
- Garage Sale Mystery (2013) – Funeral Director
- Motive (2014, in 2x6: Bad Blonde) – Alex
- Intruders (2014, in 1x2: And Here... You Must Listen, 1x5: The Shepherds and the Fox) – Marcus Fox
- The P. I. Experiment (2015) – Bill 'The One Armed Man'
- Beyond (2017) – Arthur
