= Brushstrokes (film) =

- Directed by: Sylvie Fefer
- Animation by: Sylvie Fefer
- Release date: 1982
- Running time: 3 minutes
- Country: Canada
- Language: English

Brushstrokes is a 1982 Canadian animated short film directed by Sylvie Fefer.

== Summary ==
The film depicts an animator who is pulled into the world he is drawing.

== Accolades ==
The film was one of the winners of the 1983 Canadian Independent Short Film Showcase, which saw the winning films given wider theatrical distribution. It was later co-winner of the award for best animated film at the 1983 Universiade International Student Film Festival.

The film was a Genie Award nominee for Best Theatrical Short Film at the 5th Genie Awards in 1984. It was also one of the initial qualifying films for the Academy Award for Best Animated Short Film at the 57th Academy Awards in 1985, but was not one of the final nominees.
