= Edythe Shuttleworth =

Canadian opera singer (1907–1983)

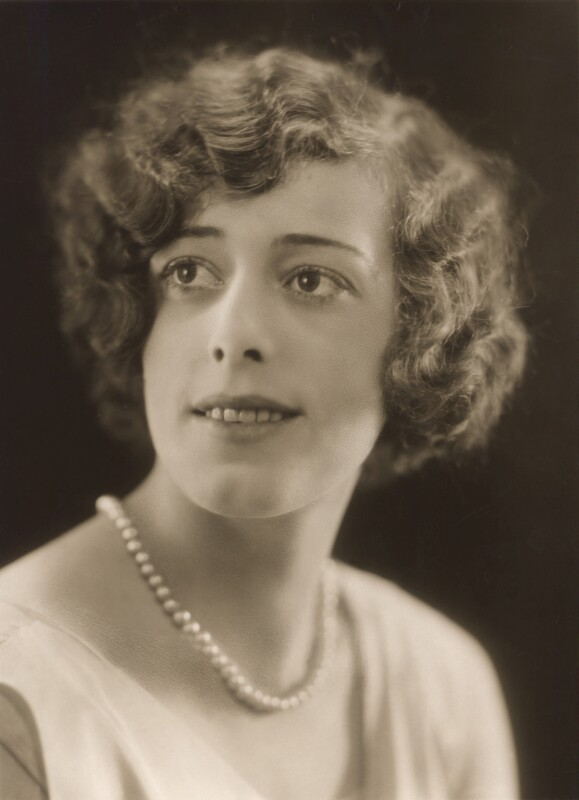
- Shuttleworth in 1928
- Born: Edythe Marjorie Shuttleworth; 1907; Toronto, Ontario, Canada
- Died: December 23, 1983 (aged 75–76); Toronto, Ontario, Canada
- Education: The Royal Conservatory of Music
- Occupation: Mezzo-soprano
- Years active: 1928–1938

Edythe Marjorie Shuttleworth (1907 – December 23, 1983) was a Canadian mezzo-soprano. She toured the rural areas of both Western Canada and the Central United States and was selected to sing on the first international radio broadcast to the United States from the Eiffel Tower in Paris. Shuttleworth made her operatic debut in the United States with the National Opera Company at the Metropolitan Opera in New York in 1934 before retiring professional when she got married in 1938.

== Life and career ==
Shuttleworth was born in 1907, in Toronto, Ontario and not Moose Jaw, Saskatchewan. She was the daughter of the Dominion Bank of Canada director John Kenyon Shuttleworth and his wife Edith Shuttleworth. She matriculated to The Royal Conservatory of Music before studying under La Scala coach Giovanni Pinetti in Italy. Shuttleworth made her debut at the Hart House Theatre at the University of Toronto in early 1928. After giving more than 200 concerts in an extensive tour of the rural areas of both Western Canada and the Central United States, that May, she performed at St. James United Church in Montreal during her first professional appearance in the Quebec city, and went on to sing in the first broadcast of a concert in Toronto on the Eastern Chain of the radio network CNR. Shuttleworth also broadcast on Montreal's CNRM radio station.

She sailed with her mother to Europe late in the year to spend a year studying in France and Italy. Her teachers in France were Pauline Donalda, and Opera Comique's Georges Wague. In 1929, Shuttleworth was selected to sing on the radio for the inaugural international broadcast to the United States from Paris' Eiffel Tower. The broadcast occurred on American Independence Day, July 4, and she sang both the American and French national anthems. She served as soloist with the Vienna Symphony Orchestra at Interlaken Kursal in Interlaken, Switzerland the following month. Shuttleworth was the first singer to be provided with an all-English program in the Swiss city. She was invited to perform in Milan for her public debut in Italy accompanied by Pinetti on March 19 the year after. In 1930, Shuttleworth returned to Canada. That same year, she served a soloist on an afternoon program broadcast on the Canadian radio network. Shuttleworth returned to conduct an evening recital in Montreal's St James United Church to commemorate Saint Patrick's Day in March 1932.

She made her operatic debut in the United States with the National Opera Company at the Metropolitan Opera in New York in 1934. Shuttleworth played Amneris in Giuseppe Verdi's Aida. She went on to appear in Carmen and Maddalena with the Toronto Grand Opera Association. Shuttleworth then undertook the part of Leonora in the Miserere scene of Verdi's Il trovatore with the Ottawa Temple Choir as well as the solo role in the Russian folk song Kalinka with a male voice choir in February 1936. The following month, she was a guest artist at Toronto's St. James United Church, performing to a capacity crowd.

== Retirement and death ==
Following her marriage in 1938, Shuttleworth retired from professional singing. She died on December 23, 1983, in Toronto.

== Artistry and legacy ==
Shuttleworth had a dramatic soprano voice. A Toronto voice critic noted the singer gave "a strongly incisive character" and could develop herself "in the moods of her renditions." The Montreal Gazette wrote she had no control herself enough to produce a united "vocalizing and interpretation into a consistent whole. In the former, the registers are uneven and her power of sustaining musical phrases are weak. In the latter, unrestrained emotion too, often gets the better of musical, especially rhythmic, balance."
