= Bar Salon =

- Directed by: André Forcier
- Written by: André Forcier; Jacques Marcotte
- Produced by: André Forcier; Jean Dansereau
- Starring: Guy L'Écuyer; Madeleine Chartrand; Gélinas Fortin
- Cinematography: François Gill
- Edited by: François Gill
- Music by: Michel McLean
- Production companies: Les Ateliers du Cinéma Québécois; Les Films André Forcier
- Release date: April 4, 1974
- Running time: 84 minutes
- Country: Canada
- Language: French

Bar Salon is a Canadian drama film, directed by André Forcier and released in 1974. Considered to be the film which first established Forcier's reputation as a major filmmaking talent, the film stars Guy L'Écuyer as Charles Méthot, the owner of a seedy bar in Montreal which is failing due to its lack of clientele; desperate, he turns to his friend Larry (Gélinas Fortin) for help, and is offered a new job as manager of a busier suburban bar, where he is drawn into an affair with a topless dancer who steals his car, and eventually ends up in jail after a drunken brawl.

The cast also includes Madeleine Chartrand as Charles's daughter Michèle, Jacques Marcotte as Michèle's fiancé Robert, and Albert Payette, François Berd and Gaby Persechino as the few remaining patrons of Charles's bar.

== Critical response ==
Writing for The Globe and Mail, Martin Knelman described the film as "a low-budget, black-and-white production, with an air of stylized tawdriness that suggests a Bogart movie of the forties."

For the Toronto International Film Festival's Canadian Film Encyclopedia, Peter Morris wrote that "The anecdotal structure of Bar salon – acting that appears improvised but isn't, a sense of observation and sympathetic characterizations, a bittersweet comic tone – recalls the earlier works of Miloš Forman (Loves of a Blonde, The Fireman’s Ball). Yet André Forcier’s film is as authentically Québécois as Forman’s is Czech. The style of Bar salon, aptly described as neo-naturalism, is carefully calculated. It captures Charles’s world of failure, amorality and hopelessness extraordinarily well."
