= Elva Mai Hoover =

Canadian actress

Elva Mai Hoover is a Canadian actress. She is best known for her performance as Betty Fox in The Terry Fox Story, for which she garnered a Genie Award nomination for Best Supporting Actress at the 5th Genie Awards, in 1984, and her television roles as Mrs. Edison in The Edison Twins and Mrs. Lawson in Road to Avonlea.

She has also had guest and supporting roles in other films and television series, but worked primarily as a stage actor, most notably as painter Anne Langton in Molly Thom's The Bush-Ladies.

Hoover is the mother of writer Gemma Files, through her marriage to Australian actor Gary Files.

== Selected filmography ==
=== Film ===
List of film appearances, with year, title, and role shown
Year	Title	Role	Notes
1977	Equus	Miss Raintree	
1980	Superman II	Mother	
1982	Murder by Phone	Phone woman	
1982	Class of 1984	Ellen Corrigan	
1990	Stella	Mrs. Hough	
1996	Losing Chase	Margaret Thompson	
1997	Pippi Longstocking	Mrs. Kling (voice)	
1997	Time to Say Goodbye?	Counsellor	
1997	Hayseed	Auntie Charity	
1999	A Map of the World	Superintendent	
2008	Toronto Stories	Dog walker lady	
2011	Down the Road Again	Housekeeper	
2013	Mama	Dr. Dreyfuss' secretary	

=== Television ===
List of television appearances, with year, title, and role shown
Year	Title	Role	Notes
1974	Police Surgeon	Clara	Episode: "Borrowed Trouble"
1976	King of Kensington	Marian Martinique	Episode: "Cathy's Hobby"
1980, 1984	The Littlest Hobo	Margaret "Marge" Carrano	Episodes: "Willy and Kate", "One Door Closes"
1981	The Great Detective	Catherine Emerston	Episodes: "Murder by Proxy: Parts 1 & 2"
1982	Seeing Things		Episode: "Through the Looking Glass"
1983	The Terry Fox Story	Betty Fox	TV film
1984–1986	The Edison Twins	Mrs. Edison	Recurring role
1986	The Judge		Episode: "Just Leave Me Alone"
1986	The Truth About Alex	Mrs. Prager	TV film
1987	Danger Bay	Gail	Episode: "Time Out"
1987	Starcom: The U.S. Space Force	Malvanna Wilde (voice)	Main role
1987, 1989	Friday the 13th: The Series	Jean Flappen, Joanne	Episodes: "Doctor Jack", "The Sweetest Sting"
1988	Diamonds		Episode: "Sweetheart Deal"
1988	T. and T.	Judge	Episodes: "Junkyard Blues", "Mickey's Choice"
1989, 1993	E.N.G.	Mrs. X, Judy Heinrich	Episodes: "Dirty Trick", "Love and Marriage"
1990, 1992	Street Legal	Nancy Cross, Janis Barnett	Episodes: "The Bracelet", "Affairs of the Heart"
1990–1994	Road to Avonlea	Elvira Lawson	Recurring role (seasons 1–5)
1993	Class of '96	Faculty member	Episode: "Pilot"
1993	Tales from the Cryptkeeper	Dr. Mahdi (voice)	Episode: "This Wraps It Up"
1994	Hello Kitty and Friends	(voice)	Episodes: "The Circus Comes to Town", "Mom Loves Me After All"
1995	A Vow to Kill	Ida Lambert	TV film
1995	Choices of the Heart: The Margaret Sanger Story	NY librarian	TV film
1995	Picture Windows	Candice	Episode: "Soir Bleu"
1996	Losing Chase	Margaret Thompson	TV film
1998	Escape: Human Cargo	State Department woman	TV film
2000	Rated X	Principal's secretary	TV film
2000	Queer as Folk	Mrs. Schmidt	Episode: "Ted's Not Dead"
2001	Our Hero	Dora	Episode: "The Last Laugh Issue"
2001	The Familiar Stranger	Sheila	TV film
2001	Midwives	Ob-gyn doctor	TV film
2002	The Ripping Friends	(voice)	Episode: "The Infernal Wedding"
2010	Rookie Blue	Store owner	Episode: "Mercury Retrograde"
2011	Flashpoint	Carol	Episode: "Terror"
2011	Murdoch Mysteries	Mrs. Shanley	Episode: "Confederate Treasure"
2015–16	Odd Squad	Rita	Episodes: "Training Day", "The O Team/Show Me the Money"
2018	The Romanoffs	June	Episode: "The Royal We"
