= Guy L'Écuyer =

Canadian actor (1931–1985)

Guy L'Écuyer (July 26, 1931 – September 20, 1985) was a Canadian actor from Montreal, Quebec. He was most noted for his performance in André Forcier's 1983 film Au clair de la lune, for which he received a Genie Award nomination for Best Actor at the 5th Genie Awards in 1984.

Following his death in 1985, the Rendez-vous Québec Cinéma launched the Prix Guy-L'Écuyer, which was presented to the year's best acting performance in a Quebec film, in his memory. The award was presented until the organization created the comprehensive Jutra Awards program in 1999.

He was the grandfather of actor Antoine L'Écuyer.

== Filmography ==
=== Films ===
- 1959 - 90 Days (Les 90 Jours): Albert Métivier
- 1965 - The Merry World of Leopold Z (La vie heureuse de Léopold Z): Leopold Z. Tremblay
- 1965 - Rope Around the Neck (La Corde au cou): Bozo
- 1967 - Charlie's Day
- 1969 - Au bout de la ligne
- 1971 - Le Savoir-faire s'impose: 1re partie
- 1971 - The Christmas Martian: Laframboise / Mr. Framer
- 1971 - The Men (Les Mâles)
- 1972 - Les Indrogables
- 1972 - The Apparition (L'Apparition)
- 1972 - The Time of the Hunt (Le Temps d'une chasse): Willy
- 1973 - Trois fois passera
- 1973 - You Are Warm, You Are Warm (Tu brûles... tu brûles...): Gabriel's father
- 1974 - Night Cap
- 1974 - Le Grand Voyage
- 1974 - Bar Salon: Charles
- 1975 - Cold Journey
- 1975 - A Woman Inflamed (Tout feu, tout femme): Le chef
- 1975 - A Night in America (Une nuit en Amérique): Fred
- 1975 - Lies My Father Told Me
- 1975 - The Vultures (Les Vautours): Joseph Bériault, le croque-mort
- 1976 - The Flower Between the Teeth (La Fleur aux dents): Sylvio
- 1976 - Let's Talk About Love (Parlez-nous d'amour) : Le maquilleur
- 1976 - Little Tougas (Ti-Cul Tougas)
- 1976 - A Pacemaker and a Sidecar (L'Eau chaude, l'eau frette): Panama
- 1977 - Bernie and the Gang (Ti-mine, Bernie pis la gang...)
- 1977 - J.A. Martin Photographer (J.A. Martin photographe): Raoul
- 1978 - Jacob Two-Two Meets the Hooded Fang: Master Fish
- 1980 - Fantastica: Pompier
- 1980 - The Lucky Star: Antique Dealer
- 1980 - Hot Dogs (Les chiens chauds): River Park Cop
- 1983 - Au clair de la lune: Albert
- 1983 - Maria Chapdelaine: Capitaine
- 1984 - Amuse-gueule

=== Television ===
- 1954 - 14, rue de Galais: Le buandier
- 1956 - Nérée Tousignant: Émilien
- 1956 - La boîte à surprise: Docteur Macaroni
- 1956 - Kimo: Moko
- 1957 - Tomahawk
- 1957 - La lanterne magique
- 1957 - Le Survenant: Parfait
- 1957-1961 - La Pension Velder: Eugène Bujold
- 1957 - Radisson
- 1957 - Au chenal du moine: Parfait
- 1959 - Ouragan
- 1959 - Le grand duc
- 1960 - Les Belles histoires des pays d'en haut: Joseph Ruisselet, fils
- 1966 - Henry V: Governor of Harfleur
- 1968-1971 - Picolo: Docteur Macaroni
- 1968 - Les saintes chéries: Cameraman
- 1971 - To See Ourselves
- 1972 - Picotine: Voix de Poildepluch
- 1974 - Témoignages
- 1974 - Aux frontières du possible
- 1975 - Rosa
- 1975 - Jo Gaillard: Farmer
- 1975-1976 - La Petite Patrie: M. Thibault
- 1977 - Duplessis: Antonio Élie
- 1977 - Le Pont: Albert Fortier
- 1980 - Frédéric: Louis
- 1984 - Entre chien et loup: Quéteux Bonenfant
