= Proxyhawks =

- Directed by: Jack Darcus
- Screenplay by: Jack Darcus
- Starring: Jack Darcus; Susan Spencer
- Cinematography: Hans Klardie; Terry Hudson
- Edited by: Jack Darcus; Luke Bennett
- Music by: Simon Kendall; Chris Dahl; Charles Kobrinski; Harry Klenski; John Gray
- Release date: 1971
- Running time: 75 minutes
- Country: Canada
- Language: English

Proxyhawks is a Canadian drama film, directed by Jack Darcus and released in 1971. It starred Darcus and Susan Spencer as a married couple living on a ranch in British Columbia, whose relationship tensions and difficulties are sublimated into their care of animals; the wife keeps rabbits, while the husband threatens the safety of the rabbits by taking up falconry.

Although the film never had widespread commercial distribution, it was entered into the Best Motion Picture competition at the 24th Canadian Film Awards. It was later screened at the 1984 Festival of Festivals, as part of Front & Centre, a special retrospective program of artistically and culturally significant films from throughout the history of Canadian cinema.
