= Laura Laur =

- Directed by: Brigitte Sauriol
- Written by: Brigitte Sauriol
- Based on: Laura Laur by Suzanne Jacob
- Produced by: Nicole Robert
- Starring: Paula de Vasconcelos; Dominique Briand; Andrée Lachapelle; Jean-Pierre Ronfard
- Cinematography: Louis de Ernsted
- Edited by: André Corriveau
- Music by: Jean Corriveau
- Production company: Lux Films
- Release date: 1989
- Running time: 92 minutes
- Country: Canada
- Language: French

Laura Laur is a Canadian drama film, directed by Brigitte Sauriol and released in 1989. Adapted from the novel by Suzanne Jacob, the film stars Paula de Vasconcelos as the titular Laura Laur, an independent and sexually liberated woman who happily juggles relationships with two lovers, Gilles (Dominique Briand) and Pascal (Éric Cabana).

The film was produced in the summer and fall of 1988, Its cast also includes Andrée Lachapelle, Claude Préfontaine and Jean-Pierre Ronfard.
