= The Terry Fox Story =

1983 film by Ralph L. Thomas

- Written by: Edward Hume
- Story by: John Kastner; Rose Kastner
- Directed by: Ralph L. Thomas
- Starring: Eric Fryer
- Music by: Bill Conti
- Countries of origin: Canada; United States
- Original language: English

Production
- Producer: Bob Cooper
- Running time: 97 minutes
- Production company: HBO Premiere Films
- Budget: $2,400,000

Original release
- Network: HBO
- Release: 22 May 1983

The Terry Fox Story is a 1983 Canadian-American biographical film of Canadian amputee and runner Terry Fox. It was written by Howard Hume, John Kastner and Rose Kastner, and directed by Ralph L. Thomas. The film stars Eric Fryer as Fox, Chris Makepeace as his brother Darrell, and Robert Duvall as Fox's publicist, Bill Vigars. The cast also includes Rosalind Chao, R. H. Thomson, Elva Mai Hoover, Michael Zelniker, Saul Rubinek and Patrick Watson.

The film was produced for HBO in the United States with Canadian co-producers. Although it was also released in Canadian and British theatres, it was the first television film ever made for a cable network.

The movie included the song "Runner", which was written by rock artist Ian Thomas in response to the coverage of Terry Fox's efforts.

== Plot ==
Terry Fox, aspiring young Canadian athlete, learns that the pain in his right knee is due to a cancerous tumour, and his sporting career comes to an end when he receives news that his leg has to be amputated. After a period of lengthy self-reflection, Terry falls in love with Rike Noda, played by Rosalind Chao, a Christian teacher for mentally disabled children, who helps Terry in his quest to regain his self-confidence.

Despite his mother's disapproval, on April 12, 1980, Terry dips his artificial limb into the Atlantic Ocean in St. John's, Newfoundland, and sets off on a Marathon of Hope across Canada to raise money for cancer research, the disease he has been battling for three years. That summer, the young man hobbles triumphantly into Toronto, cheered by over 10,000 Canadians who have adopted the 22-year-old as a national hero. On September 1, after over 3,000 miles, he collapses in Thunder Bay, Ontario and was hospitalized.

Fox is accompanied on his journey by his friend, Doug Alward, played by Michael Zelniker, who has to bear the burden of Fox's disappointment and anger when the marathon does not meet his expectations. Robert Duvall, starring as Bill Vigars, public relations officer for the Cancer Society of Canada, also accompanies Terry on his journey, and masterminds a publicity campaign which results in mass support for Terry's Marathon of Hope.

== Cast ==
- Eric Fryer as Terry Fox
- Robert Duvall as Bill Vigars
- Chris Makepeace as Darrell Fox
- Rosalind Chao as Rika Noda
- Michael Zelniker as Doug Alward
- Elva Mai Hoover as Betty Fox
- Frank Adamson as Rolly Fox
- Marie McCann as Judith Fox

Journalist Patrick Watson, a leg amputee in real life, also plays a small cameo role as an amputee farmer who becomes inspired to join Fox on a small portion of the run.

== Production ==
The film was shot from August 23, 1982, to October 14, 1982, on a budget of $2,400,000 (equivalent to $7,178,142 in 2025).

== Release ==
The rights to the film were pre-sold to the HBO and the CTV Television Network and aired on HBO on 22 May 1983. The film was theatrically released in 100 theatres on 27 May 1983.

== Reception and awards ==
Variety wrote, "The opening section suffers slightly as a result of brevity and awkward dramatics. However, once the film moves into the actual run, it never loses its emotional grip or falters in pacing and involvement." Ron Base of the Toronto Star wrote, "That the Toronto producer Robert Cooper, director R. L. Thomas, and the screenwriter Ed Hume have been able to get truth onto the screen with so much life and intelligence is, to put it mildly, one of the season's most unexpected and refreshing surprises." David Macfarlane wrote in Maclean's that director Ralph Thomas "has chosen to avoid the risk of mystery; instead, he portrays the legend at its most obvious and simplistic level. Courage is a windswept sky. Tragedy is a swirl of violins. Banking on the cheap but correct assumption that tears already cried are waiting to be cried again, The Terry Fox Story is neither more nor less than a newspaper story that moves." Philip Wuntch wrote in The Boston Globe that the film was "well-acted and nicely directed" and "a solid piece of craftsmanship, but it still seems like a made-for-TV movie ... The long shots are not too expansive, and there's an awareness of the natural boundaries of the small screen." Halliwell's Film Guide said of the film: "True it may be, but dramatically this is a one-note film with endless pretty pictures of the countryside and in the foreground signs of failing health."

The Terry Fox Story won six awards, including Best Picture, at the 5th Genie Awards ceremony for Canadian film in 1984. Eric Fryer, the Scarborough amputee who played Fox, won Best Actor, and Michael Zelniker, won Best Supporting Actor for his role in playing Terry's best friend, Doug Alward.

- Best Picture
- Best Actor: Eric Fryer
- Best Supporting Actor: Michael Zelniker
- Best Sound (Joe Grimaldi, Bruce Carwardine, Austin Grimaldi and Glen Gauthier)
- Best Sound Editing: (same as above; tied with The Wars)
- Best Film Editing: (Ron Wisman)

The film was also nominated for Best Cinematography (Richard Ciupka) and Best Supporting Actress (Hoover). Duvall was nominated for Best Actor at the 1983 CableACE Awards, but did not win.

Despite its awards, the film was criticized by Fox's family for depicting him as ill-tempered.

== Company credits ==
- CTV Television Network
- Home Box Office (HBO)
- Robert Cooper Productions

== Distributors ==
- Home Box Office (HBO) (1983) (USA) (TV)
- Twentieth Century Fox (1983) (Canada) (theatrical)
- Roadshow Home Video (1984) (Australia) (video)
- Video Network (Brazil) (VHS)

== Film rights owner ==
- Home Box Office (HBO)

== Works cited ==
- Turner, D. John, ed. (1987). Canadian Feature Film Index: 1913-1985. Canadian Film Institute. ISBN 0660533642.
