= Elizabeth Siegfried =

American photographer

- Born: 1955 (age 70–71); Baltimore, Maryland, U.S.
- Occupation: Photographer
- Known for: Fine art photographer of self portraiture and photographic narrative
- Notable work: Specialzied in printing by platinum process, Termina consists of four grids of sixteen still images

Elizabeth Siegfried (born 1955) is an American visual art photographer of self-portraiture, photographic narrative and meditative landscapes. She has specialized in the technique of platinum printing process. Her adaptations in photography include irises and other archival digital techniques. She has held photo exhibitions in Canada, United States, Italy, Germany, Japan and Mexico. Her photographs rivet attention as they are "involved in intense self-examination -- the images delve deeply into the psyche and life of the artist herself."

A television programme featured Siegfried's photographs under the title "Behind The Camera" on Bravo! and Discovery HD in 2008.

== Biography ==
Elizabeth Siegfried was born in 1955 at Baltimore, Maryland. Right from her young age she had a passion for photography.

During her studies at the Maine photographic workshops, Siegfried learned the technique of platinum process under Sal Lopes, a specialist in this field, who was her guru during 1997 and 2010. During 2013, she learnt the technique of "Wet plate collodion" under France Scully Osterman, well known expert in this field. She specialized in this printing process while working as an artist-in-residence at the Banff Center for the Arts. She explains this technique of platinum process as "the most archival of all the photographic techniques and it produces tones of great depth. There is a three-dimensional quality to a platinum print that is unique to this process". She had drawn out plans to continue her higher education for a degree of Master of Fine Arts (MFA) in Photography from Maine Media College in Rockport, Maine starting from May 2016.

Apart from photographic work, Siegfried has also worked as a teacher at the "Gallery 44 Centre for Contemporary Photography" in Toronto for 11 years. She has conducted workshops not only in her studio but also at Ryerson Polytechnic University.

Siegfried received grant assistance for two of her photographic exhibitions, one from the Ontario Arts Council and the other from the Banff Centre for the Arts in 1992; the latter grant was as "an artist in residence".

"Termina" is one of her best photographic presentations which comprise four grids of sixteen still pictures, basically based on the film. It consists of her family from 1922 to 1945, 8mm film stills of the period from 1987 to 1992 and latest self-portraits, which says "The images in each grid convey scenes and gestures that capture personality, character and spirit."

== Awards ==
Siegfried won an award as one of the "Winning 100" and also honorary mention from the "Women in Photography International" (WIPI) at its 25th Anniversary Competition held during 2006. She also received an appreciation citation in 2010 in the WIPI's "A Decade of Images". During 2014-16 her photo titled "Fading Light" of the Carolyn series exhibited at the WIPI received appreciation. This image series of her mother, during the latter's three years of life, was presented at an exhibition of the "Photo Review’s Women’s Lives" for which Siegfried was awarded a bronze medal by "PX3 prix de la photographie Paris".

== Publications ==
Siegfried's first book is titled LifeLines (2000) with introductory remarks by Andrea Barrett. Some of the magazines where her photographs have been published are: the Schwarzweiss, La Fotografia Actual, The Women's Daybook, ARTnews, Shutterbug and Camera Arts. Her photo collections are found at the Aaron Copland House in Cortlandt Manor, New York, the Kiyosato Museum of Photographic Arts, Japan, the Canadian Museum of Contemporary Photography, Ottawa, and the Peter E. Palmquist Women in Photography International Archive in the Beinecke Rare Book & Manuscript Library at the Yale University, New Haven, Connecticut.
