= Pourquoi l'étrange Monsieur Zolock s'intéressait-il tant à la bande dessinée? =

- Directed by: Yves Simoneau
- Written by: Marie-Loup Simon
- Produced by: Nicole Boisvert
- Starring: Jean-Louis Millette; Michel Rivard
- Cinematography: Jean-Louis Chèvrefils
- Edited by: François Dupuis
- Music by: Michel Bergeron
- Production company: Productions SDA
- Release date: April 23, 1983
- Country: Canada
- Language: French

Pourquoi l'étrange Monsieur Zolock s'intéressait-il tant à la bande dessinée? ("Why was the strange Mr. Zolock so interested in comics?") is a Canadian docufiction film, released in 1983. A documentary about comic books and graphic novels, the film features interviews with comics illustrators wrapped by a fictional frame story in which Monsieur Zolock (Jean-Louis Millette), an evil supervillain, hires private investigator Dieudonné (Michel Rivard) to investigate the cultural influence of comics as part of his plot to take over the world.

The film won the Genie Award for Best Feature Length Documentary at the 5th Genie Awards in 1984.
