= Deserters (film) =

- Directed by: Jack Darcus
- Written by: Jack Darcus
- Produced by: Tom Braidwood; Jack Darcus
- Starring: Alan Scarfe; Barbara March; Jon Bryden
- Cinematography: Tony Westman
- Edited by: Jack Darcus; Bill Roxborough; Doris Dyck; Ingrid Rosen
- Music by: Michael Conway Baker
- Production company: Exile Productions
- Release date: 1983
- Running time: 96 minutes
- Country: Canada
- Language: English

Deserters is a Canadian drama film, released in 1983. Written and directed by Jack Darcus, the film stars Alan Scarfe as Ulysses Hawley, a United States Army officer who is in Canada undercover to arrest Vietnam War draft dodgers. The film's cast also includes Barbara March, Jon Bryden and Dermot Hennelly.

The film garnered six Genie Award nominations at the 5th Genie Awards in 1984, for Best Actor (Scarfe), Best Actress (March), Best Director (Darcus), Best Screenplay (Darcus), Best Editing (Darcus, Bill Roxborough, Doris Dyck and Ingrid Rosen) and Best Original Score (Michael Conway Baker).
