= Dead Wrong (film) =

- Film poster
- Directed by: Len Kowalewich
- Written by: Ron Graham
- Produced by: Len Kowalewich
- Starring: Winston Rekert; Britt Ekland
- Cinematography: Doug McKay
- Edited by: Jana Fritsch
- Music by: Karl Kobylansky
- Production companies: Heritage; Sounder Productions
- Release date: December 26, 1983
- Running time: 92 minutes
- Country: Canada
- Language: English

Dead Wrong is a Canadian crime thriller film, directed by Len Kowalewich and released in 1983. The film stars Winston Rekert as Sean Phelan, a financially struggling fisherman who agrees to smuggle marijuana into Canada aboard his boat, and Britt Ekland as Penny Lancaster, an undercover Royal Canadian Mounted Police officer who joins his crew in an attempt to catch and arrest him, but finds herself falling in love with him.

The cast also includes Dale Wilson, Jackson Davies and Alex Diakun.

The film received two Genie Award nominations at the 5th Genie Awards in 1984, for Best Cinematography (Doug McKay) and Best Original Score (Karl Kobylansky).
