= Bo Harwood =

American composer (1946–2022)

Benjamin Harwood Jr. (1946–2022), better known as Bo Harwood, was an American sound mixer, sound editor, sound engineer, music supervisor, composer, and songwriter. Harwood's sound work gained attention in the 1970s after his work on films directed by John Cassavetes. In the 1990s and 2000s, Harwood worked primarily as a mixer for several television series, including Felicity and Six Feet Under.

== Film work ==
In 1966, Bo Harwood was the lead singer and guitarist in a rock band. His first feature film score was for 1969's The Bach Train.

=== The Cassavetes films ===
Harwood began working with Cassavetes doing "a little editing" on Husbands (1970), and "a little sound editing" on Minnie and Moskowitz (1971). Before the production of 1974's A Woman Under the Influence, Cassavetes approached Harwood with the idea that he be the sound mixer as well as composer on the film. Harwood, who at the time had no experience with sound recording was hesitant but Cassavetes prevailed. He is credited as the composer (Music) and as the mixer (Sound) on the film.

Harwood composed music for three more Cassavetes films, and was credited as "Sound" for two of them. During these projects, Harwood wrote several songs, some which he co-wrote with Cassavetes, only a few of which were eventually used in the films, such as "Morning Fields of Frost and Magic," which can be heard in the audition scene of The Killing of a Chinese Bookie.

During his work with Cassavetes, Harwood claimed that the notoriously unpredictable director preferred to use the "scratch track" version of his compositions, rather than to let Harwood refine and re-record them with an orchestra. Some of these scratch tracks were recorded in Cassavetes office, with piano or guitar, as demos, and then eventually ended up in the final film. Though Harwood was sometimes surprised and embarrassed by this, the technique matched the raw, unpolished feel that marks most aspects of Cassavetes' films.

On the Criterion Collection DVD version of A Woman Under the Influence, Bo Harwood, cameraman Mike Ferris do a commentary to the movie, discussing much of their interpretations of the film and their history with Cassavetes.

Bo's relationship ended only with the death of Cassavetes in 1989. When asked by documentarian Michael Ventura, during the making of Cassavetes' last film Love Streams, what he had learned from working with Cassavetes, Harwood wistfully replied:

I learned a lot through John. I've done a lot of editing for him. Picture editing, sound editing, music editing, shot sound, composed score, and I've learned a lot about integrity...I think you know what I mean. You know, thirty years from now, I can say I rode with Billy the Kid."

== Later work ==
Starting in 1986, with Pee-wee's Playhouse, Bo Harwood has done work mixing sound for several television series, including My So-Called Life, Malcolm in the Middle, and a couple of episodes of Entourage.

Harwood, along with two other musicians, was involved in a music group named "TRIO".

== Personal life and death ==
Harwood was born in Los Angeles, California, in 1946, to Benjamin Harwood Sr., and Jeanne Elaine Yourell Harwood. His older sister was photographer Joan Almond. He died in 2022, at the age of 76.

== Selected work in film and television ==
- Composer for I'm Calling Frank (2007)
- Sound Mixer for Entourage (2 episodes) (2006)
- Sound for In Order of Appearance (2005)
- Sound Mixer for Six Feet Under (26 episodes) (2003–2005)
- Production Sound Mixer for Felicity (61 episodes) (1998–2002)
- Production Sound Mixer for Malcolm in the Middle (pilot) (2000)
- Sound for 'Til There Was You (1997)
- Production Sound Mixer for My So-Called Life (19 episodes) (1994–1995)
- Sound for Night of the Demons 2 (1994)
- Composer for Love Streams (1984)
- Composer for Happy Birthday to Me (1981)
- Composer for Ups and Downs (1983)
- Sound for My Bloody Valentine (1981)
- Sound Mixer for Terror Train (1980)
- Composer and Sound for Opening Night (1977)
- Composer and Sound for The Killing of a Chinese Bookie (1976)
- Composer (and uncredited Sound) for A Woman Under the Influence (1974)
- Music Supervisor for Minnie and Moskowitz (1971)
- Production sound mixer/ sound editor for Husbands (1970)

== Awards ==
- Cinema Audio Society Award for "Outstanding Achievement in Sound Mixing for Television-Series", Six Feet Under (2004) - NOMINATED
- Daytime Emmy Award for "Outstanding Achievement in Film Sound Mixing", Pee-wee's Playhouse (1991) – WON
- Genie Award for "Best Original Song", Ups & Downs (1984) - WON
- Genie Award for "Best Achievement in Music Score",Happy Birthday to Me (1982) - NOMINATED
- Genie Award for "Best Achievement in Overall Sound", Terror Train (1981) - NOMINATED
