= Ups and Downs (1983 film) =

1983 Canadian drama film

- Directed by: Paul Almond
- Written by: Paul Almond; Lewis Evans
- Produced by: Paul Almond
- Starring: Andrew Sabiston; Leslie Hope
- Cinematography: Peter Beniston
- Edited by: Yurij Luhovy; Susan Shanks; Antonio Virgini
- Music by: Bo Harwood; Bobby Pollard; Patricia Cullen
- Production company: Quest Film Productions
- Release date: 1983
- Running time: 97 minutes
- Country: Canada
- Language: English

Ups and Downs is a Canadian drama film, directed by Paul Almond and released in 1983. Set in a co-educational private boarding school, the film centers on the rivalries and dramas experienced by a group of students.

The cast includes Andrew Sabiston, Leslie Hope, Eric Angus, Margo Nesbitt, Gavin Brennan, Colin Skinner, Alison Kemble, Bobby Pollard, Sandy Gauthier, Steve Wright and Santiago Garcia De Leániz.

The film was shot on the campus of St. Michaels University School in Saanich, British Columbia.

The film received four Genie Award nominations at the 5th Genie Awards in 1984, for Best Art Direction or Production Design (Glen Bydwell), Best Overall Sound (Dino Pigat, David Appleby, Lars Ekstrom), Best Sound Editing (John Kelly, David Evans, Wayne Griffin) and Best Original Song (Bo Harwood, Bobby Pollard). It won the award for Best Original Song.
