= Au clair de la lune (film) =

- Directed by: André Forcier
- Written by: André Forcier; Jacques Marcotte; Michel Pratt; Guy L'Écuyer; Michel Côté; Bernard Lalonde
- Produced by: Bernard Lalonde; Louis Laverdière
- Starring: Guy L'Écuyer; Michel Côté
- Cinematography: André Gagnon; François Gill
- Edited by: François Gill
- Music by: Joël Bienvenue
- Production companies: Les Productions Albine; National Film Board
- Release date: March 3, 1983
- Running time: 92 minutes
- Country: Canada
- Language: French

Au clair de la lune is a Canadian drama film, directed by André Forcier and released in 1983. The film stars Guy L'Écuyer as Albert, a washed-up former bowling champion living in his car while dreaming of recapturing his past success, and Michel Côté as François, an albino who moves into the car after Bert saves his life.

The film received four Genie Award nominations at the 5th Genie Awards in 1984: Best Actor (L'Écuyer), Best Director (Forcier), Best Costume Design (François Laplante) and Best Original Score (Joël Bienvenue).

In 2023, Telefilm Canada announced that the film was one of 23 titles that will be digitally restored under its new Canadian Cinema Reignited program to preserve classic Canadian films.
