= Maria Chapdelaine (1983 film) =

1983 Canadian film by Gilles Carle

- Directed by: Gilles Carle
- Written by: Gilles Carle; Guy Fournier
- Produced by: Murray Shostak; Robert Baylis
- Starring: Carole Laure; Nick Mancuso
- Cinematography: Pierre Mignot; Richard Leiterman
- Edited by: Avdé Chiriaeff
- Music by: Lewis Furey
- Distributed by: Astral Media (Canada); UGC (France)
- Release date: 28 April 1983
- Running time: 107 minutes
- Country: Canada
- Language: French
- Budget: $4.6 million

Maria Chapdelaine is a French-Canadian historical drama film, released in 1983. An adaptation of Louis Hémon's novel Maria Chapdelaine, the film was directed and co-written by Gilles Carle and starred Carole Laure in the title role.

== Plot ==
Maria Chapdelaine is set in the Lac Saint-Jean region of Quebec in the early years of the 20th century. The beautiful Maria (Carole Laure), who dreams of an easier life than the one she must endure in the wilderness, gives her heart to a handsome lumberjack (Nick Mancuso) and waits for his return.

== Cast ==
The cast includes Claude Rich, Amulette Garneau, Yoland Guérard, Pierre Curzi, Donald Lautrec, Gilbert Sicotte, Guy Thauvette, Stéphane Quéry, Josée-Anne Fortin, Louis-Philippe Milot, Gilbert Comptois, Patrick Messe, Claude Evrard, Claude Berval, Guy Godin, Marie Tifo, Jean-Pierre Masson, Dominique Briand, Claude Prégent, Angèle Arsenault, Jean Ricard, Guy L'Écuyer, Rolland Bédard, Raoul Duguay, Michel Rivard, Gilles Valiquette, Michel Langevin, Cédric Noël, José Ledoux, Renée Girard, Rock Demers, Yvon Sarrazin, Claude Trudel, Jean-Pierre Rhéaume, Georges Levchtouk and Gilbert Moore.

== Production ==
Gilles Carle was selected to direct the film due to his successful adaption of Roger Lemelin's Les Plouffe. Astral Bellevue Pathé, Canadian Broadcasting Corporation, and TF1 Group produced the film. The film was shot from 18 October to 20 December 1982, on a budget of $4.6 million (equivalent to $13,758,106 in 2025). $250,000 in funding came from the SDICC.

== Release ==
The film was distributed by Astral Media in Canada and UGC in France. It premiered at Place du Canada on 28 April 1983. The film was seen by 127,003 people in France.

== Awards and nominations ==
At the 5th Genie Awards in 1984, the film earned 4 Genie Awards from 11 nominations:

- Best Motion Picture
- Best Actor: Nick Mancuso
- Best Actress: Carole Laure
- Best Supporting Actor: Pierre Curzi
- Best Supporting Actress: Amulette Garneau
- Best Art Direction: **Jocelyn Joly**
- Best Cinematography: **Pierre Mignot**
- Best Costume Design: **Michèle Hamel**
- Best Overall Sound: Austin Grimaldi, Patrick Rousseau, Joe Grimaldi and Dino Pigat
- Best Sound Editing: Claude Langlois, Patrick Dodd and Jean-Guy Montpetit
- Best Original Score: **Lewis Furey**

bold denotes award winner

== Works cited ==
- Marshall, Bill (2001). Quebec National Cinema. McGill–Queen's University Press. ISBN 0-7735-2103-8.
- Turner, D. John, ed. (1987). Canadian Feature Film Index: 1913-1985. Canadian Film Institute. ISBN 0660533642.
