= Brigitte Sauriol =

Canadian film director and screenwriter (born 1945)

Brigitte Sauriol (born 1945 in Montreal, Quebec) is a Canadian film director and screenwriter. She is most noted for her 1983 film Just a Game (Rien qu'un jeu), for which she received a Genie Award nomination for Best Director at the 5th Genie Awards in 1984.

Her other credits included the films Le Loup blanc, The Absence (L'Absence), Bleue brume and Laura Laur, and an episode of the television series Haute tension. She teaches screenwriting at the Université du Québec à Montréal.
