= Snow (1983 film) =

Canadian short drama film

- Directed by: Tibor Takács
- Written by: Stephen Zoller
- Produced by: Tibor Takács; Stephen Zoller
- Starring: Douglas Campbell; Torquil Campbell; Cynthia Dale
- Production company: New Frontier Films
- Release date: September 1983 (Toronto)
- Running time: 13 minutes
- Country: Canada
- Language: English

Snow is a Canadian short drama film, directed by Tibor Takács and released in 1983. A Christmas-themed family film, it stars Douglas Campbell and Torquil Campbell.

The cast also includes Simon Craig, Cynthia Dale, Lawrence King-Phillips, Ken McDougall, R. H. Thomson and Richard Yearwood.

The film premiered at the 1983 Festival of Festivals. It was later screened at the 34th Berlin International Film Festival in 1984.

The film was a Genie Award nominee for Best Theatrical Short Film at the 5th Genie Awards in 1984.
