= A 20th Century Chocolate Cake =

- Directed by: Lois Siegel
- Written by: Greg Van Riel
- Produced by: Lois Siegel
- Starring: Greg Van Riel; Charles Fisch, Jr.
- Cinematography: Georges Archambault; Peter Benison; Ken Decker; Donald Delorme; Raymond Gravel; Serge Ladouceur; Glen MacPherson; Mike Rixon; Lois Siegel; Daniel Villeneuve; Werner Volkmer; François Warot
- Edited by: Lois Siegel
- Music by: André Vincelli
- Production company: Chocolate Cake Productions
- Release date: June 1, 1983
- Running time: 70 minutes
- Country: Canada
- Language: English

A 20th Century Chocolate Cake is a Canadian comedy docufiction film, directed by Lois Siegel and released in 1983. The film stars Greg Van Riel and Charles Fisch Jr. as Greg and Charles, two young men in Montreal who are trying to find creative fulfillment in their professional lives. Greg pursues work as a freelance writer of human interest journalism, while the openly gay Charles takes a job as a dancer in a gay bar.

The film was an expansion of an earlier short film, Recipe to Cook a Clown, which Siegel, Van Riel, and Fisch had made together in the 1970s. Due to budgetary limitations, the film took over three years to make, went through a dozen different cinematographers, and was shot predominantly on stray ends of donated film from other film projects.

André Vincelli received Genie Award nominations for Best Original Score and Best Original Song at the 5th Genie Awards in 1984.
