= The Ballad of Hard Times =

1983 Canadian documentary film

- French: La turlute des années dures
- Directed by: Richard Boutet; Pascal Gélinas
- Written by: Richard Boutet; Pascal Gélinas; Lucille Veilleux
- Produced by: Lucille Veilleux
- Cinematography: Robert Vanherweghem
- Edited by: Francis van den Heuvel
- Music by: Gilles Garand; Pascal Gélinas
- Production companies: Cinak Compagnie Cinématographique; Les Productions Vent d'Est; Radio-Québec
- Distributed by: 7e Art Distribution
- Release date: March 24, 1983
- Running time: 90 minutes
- Country: Canada
- Language: French

The Ballad of Hard Times (French: La turlute des années dures) is a Canadian documentary film, directed by Richard Boutet and Pascal Gélinas and released in 1983. The film documents the effects of the Great Depression in Quebec through the testimonies of survivors of the period; the film takes its name from its soundtrack of popular Depression-era Quebec folk music, including the songs of La Bolduc.

The film won the Prix L.-E.-Ouimet-Molson from the Association québécoise des critiques de cinéma, and received a Genie Award nomination for Best Feature Length Documentary at the 5th Genie Awards in 1984.
