= Bruno Carrière =

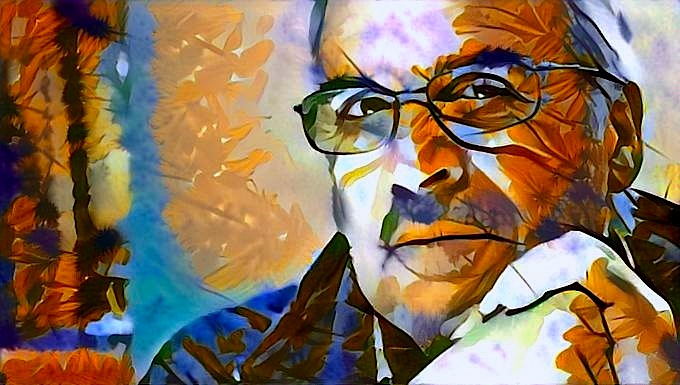
Bruno Carrière

Bruno Carrière (born 1953 in Cornwall, Ontario) is a Canadian film and television director and screenwriter. He is most noted for his film Lucien Brouillard, for which he garnered a Genie Award nomination for Best Director at the 5th Genie Awards in 1984.

His other credits have included the television series Traquenards, Super sans plomb, Diva and Rivière-des-Jérémie, and the documentary films 7 cordes pour une deuxième vie, L'art n'est point sans Soucy, Passions orchestrée, A session with Nettie and L'art est un jeu.
