= Alan Scarfe =

British-Canadian actor (1946–2024)

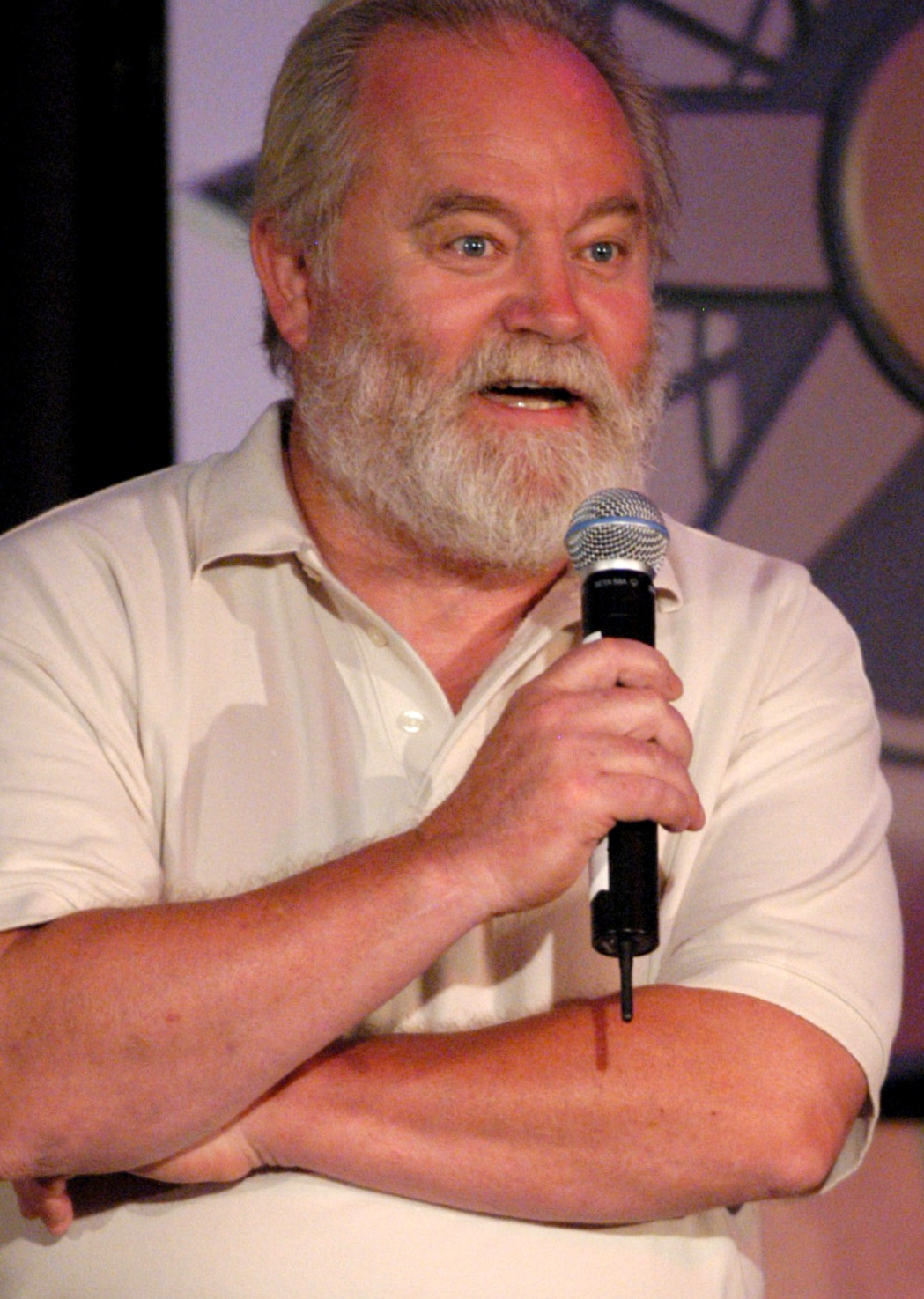
- Alan Scarfe, 2005
- Born: Alan John Scarfe; 8 June 1946; Harpenden, England
- Died: 28 April 2024 (aged 77); Longueuil, Quebec, Canada
- Occupations: Actor; Stage Director; Author
- Years active: 1962–2007
- Spouse: Barbara March (m. 1979; died 2019)
- Children: Jonathan Scarfe

Alan John Scarfe (8 June 1946 – 28 April 2024) was a British–Canadian actor, stage director and author. He was an Associate Director of the Stratford Festival (1976–77) and the Everyman Theatre in Liverpool (1967–68).

Scarfe won the 1985 Genie Award for Best Performance by an Actor in a Supporting Role for his role in The Bay Boy and earned two other Genie best actor nominations for Deserters (1984) and Overnight (1986) and a Gemini Award nomination for best actor in aka Albert Walker (2003). He won a Jessie Award for best actor in 2005 for his performance in Trying at the Vancouver Playhouse. In 2006 he won the Jury Prize for best supporting actor at the Austin Fantastic Fest in The Hamster Cage and the Vancouver Film Critics Circle honorary award for lifetime achievement.

== Early life ==
Scarfe was born in Harpenden, England to Gladys Ellen (née Hunt) (1908–90) and Neville Vincent Scarfe (1908–85), both university professors. Neville Scarfe was the Founding Dean of the Faculty of Education at UBC and served in that position from 1956 to 1973.

== Career ==
Scarfe trained at the London Academy of Music and Dramatic Art (1964–66) and began his career as a classical stage actor. He has performed over 100 major roles in theatres across Europe (London, Liverpool, Coventry, Paris, Lille, Copenhagen, The Hague, Madrid, Warsaw, Kraków, Moscow and St. Petersburg), Canada (eight seasons at the Stratford Festival, 1972-3, 1976–9, 1985, 1992, two seasons at the Shaw Festival, 1970, 1974, as well as Vancouver, Calgary, Toronto, Montreal and Halifax) and the United States (New York, Boston, New Haven, Stamford, Philadelphia, Seattle, Dallas and Los Angeles), including King Lear, Othello, Hamlet, Iago, Brutus, Cassius, Petruchio, Prospero, Cyrano de Bergerac, Doctor Faustus, Luther, Uncle Vanya, Verlaine, John Barrymore in Sheldon Rosen's Ned and Jack and Harras in Zuckmayer's The Devil's General. He is also a stage director whose productions have ranged from the works of Shakespeare to Albee, Brecht, Beckett, Arthur Miller, Harold Pinter, Yevgeny Schwarz and Preston Jones.

Scarfe played NSA member Dr. Bradley Talmadge, the director of the Backstep Project operations, on the UPN series Seven Days. He also had guest roles as two separate Romulan characters in Star Trek: The Next Generation and as Magistrate Augris in the Star Trek: Voyager episode "Resistance". In 2003 he co-starred with his son Jonathan in Burn: The Robert Wraight Story.

After returning to Canada from Los Angeles in 2002, he began writing novels under the pseudonym Clanash Farjeon (an anagram of his full name). The titles include A Handbook for Attendants on the Insane: the Autobiography of Jack the Ripper as Revealed to Clanash Farjeon (which has been called 'one of the finest books on historical crime ever published'), The Vampires of Ciudad Juarez, about the hypocrisy of the War on Drugs and the tragedy of 'las desaparecidas', The Vampires of 9/11, a political satire about America's blindness and inability to accept who the real culprits are, and the third book of the trilogy Vampires of the Holy Spirit completes the story in Rome during April 2005, the beginning of the papacy of Joseph Ratzinger. The first three can also be found in Italian (originally published by Gargoyle Books in Rome which since the death of the editor Paolo de Crescenzo in 2013 has closed its doors) under the titles Le Memorie di Jack lo Squartatore, I vampiri di Ciudad Juarez (both translated by Chiara Vatteroni) and I vampiri dell'11 settembre (translated by Stefania Sapuppo). In March 2014 Mosaic Press published The Autobiography of Jack the Ripper as revealed to Clanash Farjeon but this is no longer an approved edition. All four novels have now been republished, fully revised and without the pseudonym, by Smart House Books and have been retitled as The Revelation of Jack the Ripper, and the 'Carnivore Trilogy' as The Vampires of Juarez, The Demons of 9/11, and The Mask of the Holy Spirit.

The Vampires of Juarez was awarded the 2018 BIBA Star. The Revelation of Jack the Ripper won the 2019 BIBA (Best Indie Book Award). The Mask of the Holy Spirit won the 2020 BIBA for Satire.

== Personal life and death ==
Scarfe has a son named Jonathan Scarfe who is also an actor and director. He was married to Barbara March from 1979 until her death from cancer in 2019. They had a daughter named Antonia (Tosia) Scarfe who is a musician and composer. Jonathan and Tosia collaborated on the short film Speak, Jonathan as director, Tosia as composer and performer of the title song, which won the Grand Jury Prize in the Short Category at Dances with Films in Los Angeles in 2001. He has two brothers; Colin Scarfe who was a professor of astronomy at the University of Victoria, and Brian Scarfe, who was a professor of economics at the University of Manitoba, University of Alberta, University of Regina, a senior university administrator at Alberta and Regina, and an Economics Consultant. Scarfe described himself as a lifelong atheist.

Scarfe died from colon cancer at his home in Longueuil, Quebec, on 28 April 2024, at the age of 77.

== Filmography ==
=== Film ===
Alan Scarfe film credits
| Year | Title | Role | Ref. |
|---|---|---|---|
| 1963 | The Bitter Ash | Des | |
| 1977 | Cathy's Curse | George Gimble | |
| 1982 | Murder by Phone | John Websole | |
| 1983 | The Wars | Capt. Leather | |
| 1983 | Deserters | Sergeant Ulysses Hawley | |
| 1984 | The Bay Boy | Sgt. Tom Coldwell | |
| 1984 | Walls | Ron Simmons | |
| 1985 | Joshua Then and Now | Jack Trimble | |
| 1985 | Overnight | Vladimir Jezda | |
| 1986 | Keeping Track | Royle Wishart | |
| 1987 | Street Justice | Eugene Powers | |
| 1988 | Iron Eagle II | Col. Vardovsky | |
| 1989 | Kingsgate | Daniel Kingsgate | |
| 1990 | Divided Loyalties | George Washington | |
| 1991 | Double Impact | Nigel Griffith | |
| 1992 | Lethal Weapon 3 | Herman Walters | |
| 1993 | The Portrait | David Severn | |
| 1997 | Back in Business | David Ashby | |
| 1997 | The Wrong Guy | Farmer Brown | |
| 1997 | Silence | Lawyer | |
| 1998 | Sanctuary | William Dyson | |
| 2005 | The Hamster Cage | Phil | |

=== Television ===
Alan Scarfe television credits
| Year | Title | Role | Notes | Ref. |
|---|---|---|---|---|
| 1983 | Will There Really Be a Morning? | Doctor #3 | TV movie | |
| 1984 | The Littlest Hobo | Dr. Richard Kellerman | 2 episodes | |
| 1985 | The Execution of Raymond Graham | The Governor | TV movie | |
| 1986, 1989 | The Ray Bradbury Theater | Mr. Nesbitt / John Oatis Kendall | 2 episodes | |
| 1987 | American Playhouse | Dr. Jim Bayliss | Episode: "All My Sons" | |
| 1988 | C.A.T. Squad: Python Wolf | Bekker | TV movie | |
| 1989 | Day One | Ernest Lawrence | TV movie | |
| 1989 | Hunter | Milo | 1 episode | |
| 1989 | Alien Nation | Drevni | 1 episode | |
| 1989–1990 | Tour of Duty | Col. Stringer | 5 episodes | |
| 1990 | Columbo Cries Wolf | Sir Harry Matthews | TV movie | |
| 1990 | Jake and the Fatman | Jackson | 1 episode | |
| 1990 | MacGyver | Major Krik | 1 episode | |
| 1991 | The Owl | Hutchins | TV movie | |
| 1991 | Mimi & Me | Unknown | TV movie | |
| 1991 | Quantum Leap | Dr. Mason Crane | 1 episode | |
| 1991 | Star Trek: The Next Generation | Admiral Mendak | Episode: "Data's Day" (S4.E11) | |
| 1993 | Star Trek: The Next Generation | Tokath | Episode: "Birthright, Part II" (S6.E17) | |
| 1993 | Counterstrike | Lord Shefield | Episode: "Bad Guys" | |
| 1993 | NYPD Blue | Thomas Wagner | 2 episodes | |
| 1993 | Jericho Fever | Klaus Bausen | TV movie | |
| 1994 | Gunsmoke: One Man's Justice | Sean Devlin | TV movie | |
| 1994 | Heart of Darkness | Captain Fenard | TV movie | |
| 1994 | Highlander | Craig Webster | 1 episode | |
| 1994 | Without Warning | General Lucian Alexander | TV movie | |
| 1995 | Star Trek: Voyager | Augris | Episode: "Resistance" | |
| 1996 | Gridlock | Martin Joss | TV movie | |
| 1996 | John Woo's Once a Thief | Robertson Graves | TV movie | |
| 1997 | The Burning Zone | The Coordinator | 1 episode | |
| 1997, 1998 | The Outer Limits | Dr. Royce / Montgomery Bennett | 2 episodes | |
| 1998 | Due South | Wilson Warfield | 1 episode | |
| 1998–2001 | Seven Days | Dr. Bradley Talmadge | Main cast | |
| 2002 | The Many Lives of Albert Walker | Paul Morrow | TV movie | |
| 2004 | Kingdom Hospital | Henry Havens | 8 episodes | |
| 2004 | Stargate Atlantis | Chancellor Druhin | 1 episode | |
| 2004 | Earthsea | Arch Magus | TV miniseries | |
| 2004–2005 | Andromeda | Flavin | 3 episodes | |
| 2007 | Babylon 5: The Lost Tales | Father Cassidy | TV movie | |
