= Skullduggery (1983 film) =

1983 Canadian horror film

Skullduggery (aka Warlock) (aka Blood Puzzle)
- Directed by: Ota Richter
- Written by: Ota Richter; Peter Wittman
- Produced by: Ota Richter; Peter Wittman
- Starring: David Calderisi; Wendy Crewson; Thom Haverstock; Jim Coburn; Kate Lynch
- Cinematography: Robert C. New
- Edited by: Ian McBride
- Music by: Eugen Illín
- Production companies: Media Home Entertainment; Wittman/Richter Films
- Distributed by: Media Home Video
- Release date: 1983
- Running time: 95 minutes
- Country: Canada
- Language: English

Skullduggery (also known as Warlock and Blood Puzzle) is a 1983 Canadian comedy horror film directed by Ota Richter. The plot depicts the devil using a role-playing game to transform a young man into a serial killer.

== Plot ==
A group of young adults working at a costume rental store also collaborate on a fantasy role-playing game. One of the players, a young man named Adam (Thom Haverstock), is the descendant of a long line of men who are all cursed by the devil. While working at the community college theater performance, a strange magician appears and puts a curse on Adam, forcing him to remember the fate of his ancestors and to make him believe that he really is a warlock.

Increasingly, Adam is unable to determine the difference between fantasy and reality and believes that, as a warlock, he is on a quest to kill various people. As the bodies pile up, the local police are baffled and no one suspects that Adam is a deranged serial killer being commanded to kill by the devil.

After having played the role-playing game with instructions to kill all the members of the Apostles of Hell before they kill him, Adam attends a costume party hosted by a man named Dr. Evil, who wants Adam to join his cult and also kill most of the party guests. When the police figure out that Adam is the killer, they corner and shoot him in a factory, but his body disappears and leaves a puppet in its place.

The survivors play a game with a suit of knight's armor seated in Adam's place. The armor comes to life and kills their dungeon master. Upon looking at the body, they learn that their dungeon master was Dr. Evil, and by extension, the devil.

== Cast ==
- David Calderisi as Sorcerer / Dr. Evil
- Wendy Crewson as Barbara / Dorigen
- Thom Haverstock as Adam
- David Main as Chuck
- Jim Coburn as Simco The Magician
- Kate Lynch as Janet
- Starr Andreeff as Irene
- Claudia Udy as Dolly
- Clark Johnson as Dave
- Geordie Johnson as Jake
- Jack Anthony as Mr. Sluszarczuk
- Sharolyn Sparrow as Carmen
- Patricia Nember as Ginny

== Release ==
The film was released during a public backlash against games perceived as promoting occult activities among young people.

Following its 1983 theatrical release, the film was later issued on VHS by Media Home Entertainment, and then licensed to budget label Video Treasures. JEF Films released a DVD in January 2008.
