= Lucien Brouillard =

- Directed by: Bruno Carrière
- Written by: Bruno Carrière; Jacques Jacob; Jacques Paris
- Produced by: Marc Daigle; René Gueissaz
- Starring: Pierre Curzi; Roger Blay; Marie Tifo
- Cinematography: Pierre Mignot
- Edited by: Michel Arcand
- Music by: Yves Laferrière
- Production company: ACPAV
- Release date: 21 March 1983
- Running time: 90 minutes
- Country: Canada
- Language: French

Lucien Brouillard is a 1983 French Canadian political drama film directed by Bruno Carrière. It stars Pierre Curzi, Roger Blay, and Marie Tifo.

== Plot ==
Lucien Brouillard is a radical political activist whose aggressive efforts to combat injustice often lands him in trouble and leads him to neglect his wife Alice and their baby. The situation deteriorates when he unexpectedly encounters his childhood friend Martineau, a rich lawyer who has a close relationship with the provincial government.

== Cast ==
- Pierre Curzi as Lucien Brouillard
- Roger Blay as Jacques Martineau
- Marie Tifo as Alice Tanguay
- Paul Savoie as André Morin
- Jean Duceppe as Prime Minister Provencher
- Germain Houde as Detective

== Accolades ==
The film received six Genie Award nominations in 1984, for Best Motion Picture, Best Actor, Best Actress, Best Director, Best Art Director and Best Costume Design.
