= Barbara March =

Canadian actress (1953–2019)

- Born: Barbara Jean Maczka; October 9, 1953; Toronto, Ontario, Canada
- Died: August 11, 2019 (aged 65)
- Education: University of Windsor
- Occupation: Actress
- Known for: Lursa on Star Trek: The Next Generation
- Spouse: Alan Scarfe (m. 1979)
- Children: 1

Barbara March (born Barbara Jean Maczka; October 9, 1953 – August 11, 2019) was a Canadian actress best known for her portrayal of the Star Trek character Lursa, one of the Duras sisters. She appeared as Lursa in Star Trek: The Next Generation ("Redemption" and "Firstborn"), Star Trek: Deep Space Nine ("Past Prologue"), and Star Trek Generations.

== Biography ==
Other credits included Total Security, L.A. Law, The Portrait, The Gambler Returns: The Luck of the Draw, Blood Ties, Kingsgate, Nightheat and Deserters for which she earned a Genie Award nomination for Best Actress.

March attended the University of Windsor, and began acting shortly after graduating. March was an accomplished stage performer and starred at Canada's Stratford Shakespeare Festival and the Guthrie Theater in Minneapolis, as well as in both New York and Los Angeles. She received critical acclaim as Isabella in Measure for Measure, Desdemona in Othello, Titania in A Midsummer Night's Dream, the title heroine in The Duchess of Malfi, Ruth in Harold Pinter's The Homecoming and, on many occasions, Lady Macbeth.

March was also a playwright and screenwriter. Her play The Razing of Charlotte Brontë is also available in Italian as Le riflessioni di Charlotte Brontë and she published a novella, The Copper People.

March married Alan Scarfe in 1979 and they had a daughter named Antonia (Tosia), born in 1985, who is a musician and composer.

She died of cancer on August 11, 2019, at the age of 65.

== Filmography ==
Year	Title	Role	Notes
1983	Deserters	Val Manufort	
1989	Kingsgate		
1992	The Portrait	Marguerite Chirac	
1987–1994	Star Trek: The Next Generation	Lursa	Various episodes
1993	Star Trek: Deep Space Nine	Lursa	Episode 3, Season 1
1994	Star Trek Generations	Lursa	Feature film
