= Eric Fryer (actor) =

Canadian actor

Eric Fryer is a Canadian actor, who played Terry Fox in the 1983 biopic The Terry Fox Story.

Originally from Scarborough, Ontario, he was cast because he was a leg amputee who had some physical resemblance to Fox. As he was a novice actor, however, the film's producers hired Rosemary Dunsmore as a dedicated acting coach to guide Fryer in performing. At the time of his casting he did not appreciate what Fox had done, telling The Globe and Mail that "he wasn't an inspiration because, when that's happening to you, you're in your own little world. I just wanted to get on with my own life and not worry about some guy who was running across Canada. I wanted to get myself together." After acting Fox's life onscreen his perspective changed, however, and he began telling the press that working on the film had given him greater insight into Fox's determination and the scope of his achievement.

Fryer won the award for Best Actor at the 5th Genie Awards. He only appeared in two other minor acting roles thereafter, appearing in episodes of The Beachcombers ("High Tension", February 19, 1984) and Home Fires.
