= Just a Game (film) =

- Film poster
- French: Rien qu'un jeu
- Directed by: Brigitte Sauriol
- Written by: Monique Messier; Brigitte Sauriol
- Produced by: Claude Bonin
- Starring: Raymond Cloutier; Marie Tifo
- Cinematography: Paul Van der Linden
- Edited by: Marcel Pothier
- Music by: Yves Laferrière
- Production company: Ciné Groupe
- Distributed by: Astral Films
- Release date: May 12, 1983 (Cannes)
- Running time: 89 minutes
- Country: Canada
- Language: French

Just a Game (French: Rien qu'un jeu) is a Canadian drama film, directed by Brigitte Sauriol and released in 1983. An examination of incest, the film stars Raymond Cloutier as André, a married father who is committing incest with his daughters, and Marie Tifo as Mychèle, his unhappily married wife whose resentment of their daughters has led her to turn a blind eye to her husband's activities.

The film premiered at the 1983 Cannes Film Festival, and had its Canadian theatrical premiere in October 1983. The film faced some controversy in early 1984, when the Ontario Censor Board refused to permit it to be screened in Ontario unless the two scenes that most visibly depicted the incest were cut, even though Sauriol had carefully shot them to prevent them from being seen as sexually graphic.

The film received three Genie Award nominations at the 5th Genie Awards in 1984, for Best Director (Sauriol), Best Actress (Tifo) and Best Sound Editing (Marcel Pothier).

== Cast ==
- Raymond Cloutier as André
- Marie Tifo as Mychèle
- Jennifer Grenier as Catherine
- Julie Mongeau as Julie

== Critical response ==
Writing about the film's premiere at Cannes, Jay Scott of The Globe and Mail called the film "stultifyingly predictable" and "psychologically simplistic", and opined that Sauriol "depends on her sincerity to mask mistakes". Reviewing the film during its theatrical run, his colleague Carole Corbeil gave it a more nuanced review, likening it to "one long bad For the Record; it invents characters to advance a theme", but calling it "honest, and gritty, and this quality redeems it somewhat".

The film was purchased by several anti-incest activist groups for use in educational campaigns.
