= Jack Darcus =

Canadian film director, screenwriter, and painter

- Born: February 22, 1941 (age 85); Vancouver, British Columbia, Canada
- Occupations: Film director Screenwriter; Film producer Painter
- Years active: 1969–1997

Jack Winston Darcus (born February 22, 1941, in Vancouver, British Columbia) is a Canadian film director, screenwriter, and painter. Since graduating from the University of British Columbia with a Bachelor of Arts Degree in 1963, Jack Darcus has divided his artistic career between painting and filmmaking. In 1969, already an established painter, he directed his first feature film - a documentary entitled Great Coups of History. Though consistently well received by critics, his films have never reached a large audience beyond film scholars and fanatics. In 1982, he wrote and directed Deserters, his most acclaimed film which concerns two American Vietnam War deserters in Canada. The film earned Darcus three Genie Award nominations for his direction, screenplay and editing. Darcus had also directed for the CBC and Atlantis Films. Darcus has not directed a film since 1997 but still remains a devoted painter whose paintings have been exhibited nationally and internationally, and he has also written three novels.

== Selected filmography ==
- Great Coups of History (1969) (Documentary)
- Proxyhawks (1971)
- The Wolfpen Principle (1974)
- Deserters (1983)
- Overnight (1985)
- Kingsgate (1989)
- The Portrait (1992)
- Silence (1997)
