= Harry Oakes =

Canadian-British philanthropist

Sir Harry Oakes Bt
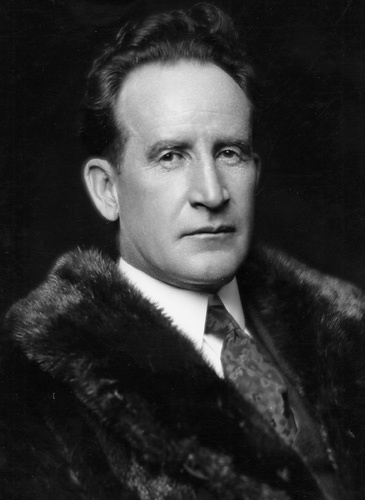
- Oakes in 1925
- Born: Harry Oakes; 23 December 1874; Sangerville, Maine, U.S.
- Died: 8 July 1943 (aged 68); Nassau, Bahamas
- Citizenship: United States, United Kingdom (naturalized)
- Education: Foxcroft Academy
- Alma mater: Bowdoin College; Syracuse University
- Occupation: Businessman
- Spouse: Eunice Myrtle McIntyre (m. 1923)
- Children: 5
- Parent(s): William Pitt Oakes; Edith Nancy Lewis

Sir Harry Oakes, 1st Baronet (23 December 1874 – 8 July 1943) was a British gold mine owner, entrepreneur, investor and philanthropist. He earned his fortune in Canada and moved to the British Bahamas in the 1930s for tax purposes. Though American by birth, he became a British subject and was granted the hereditary title of baronet in 1939.

Oakes was murdered in 1943 under mysterious circumstances, and the subsequent trial ended with acquittal of the accused. No further legal proceedings have taken place on the matter, the cause of death and the details surrounding it have never been entirely determined (though are thought to be unusually grisly) and the case has been the subject of several books and four films.

== Biography ==
=== Early life ===
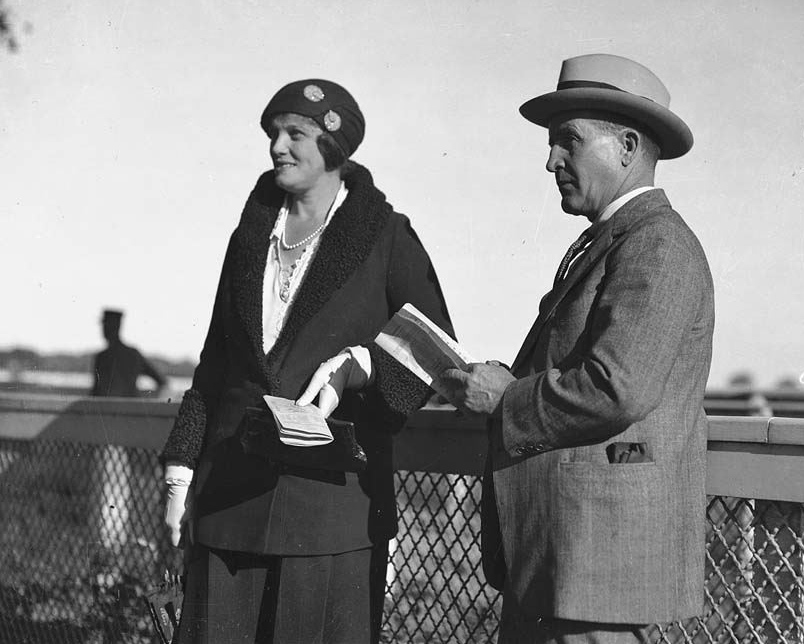
Harry and Eunice Oakes in Toronto in the 1930s

Oakes was born in Sangerville, Maine, one of five children of William Pitt Oakes and Edith Nancy Lewis. His father was a prosperous lawyer. Harry Oakes graduated from Foxcroft Academy and went on to Bowdoin College in 1896, and he spent two years at the Syracuse University Medical School. One of his sisters, Gertrude Oakes, died in the 1935 sinking of the ocean liner SS Mohawk off the New Jersey coast.

=== Mining career ===
In 1898, Oakes left medical school before graduation and made his way to Alaska, at the height of the Klondike Gold Rush, in hopes of making his fortune as a prospector. For 15 years, he sought gold around the world, from California to Australia.

Oakes arrived in Kirkland Lake in Northern Ontario, Canada, on 19 June 1911. On 23 September 1911, he registered the transfer of claim T-1663, purchased from George Minaker, and established Lake Shore Mine. Twenty years later, the gold mine was the most productive in the Western Hemisphere, and it ultimately proved to be the second-largest gold mine in the Americas. His lavish lifestyle included a 1928 Hispano-Suiza H6B luxury car.

=== Moves to Bahamas, is created baronet ===
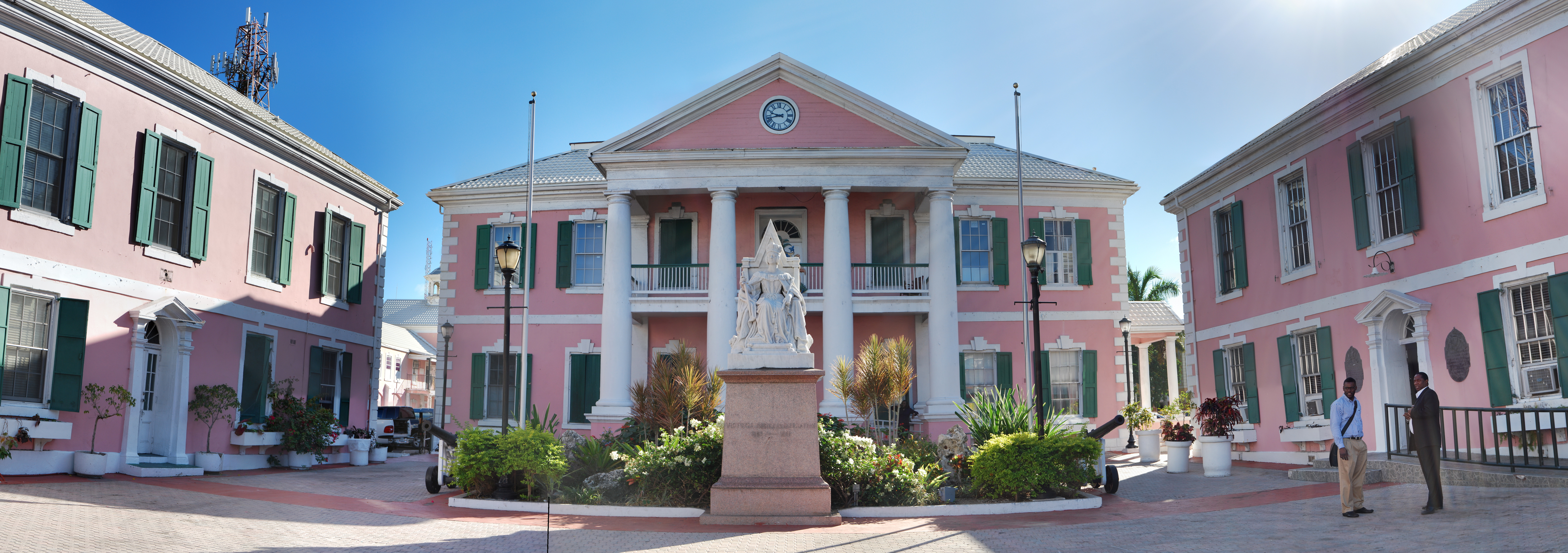
Bahamas House of Assembly

Oakes became a British subject, and he lived in the Bahamas for tax reasons from 1935 until his death (He was paying 85% under the Canadian tax code prior to his move). He was invited to the British colony by Sir Harold Christie, a prominent Bahamian real estate developer and legislator, who became a close business associate and friend.

In 1939, Oakes was created a baronet by King George VI as a reward for his philanthropic endeavours in the Bahamas, Canada and Britain. He donated US$500,000 in two bequests to St George's Hospital in London, and he gave US$1 million to charities in the Bahamas. He became a member of the colony's House of Assembly.

=== Bahamian investments ===
Oakes soon proved to be a dynamic investor, entrepreneur and developer in the Bahamas. He had a major role in expanding the airport, Oakes Field, in the capital Nassau; bought the British Colonial Hilton Nassau; built a golf course and country club; and developed farming and new housing. All of this activity greatly stimulated the struggling economy, with only about 70,000 inhabitants in the early 1940s. This activity took place mainly on the principal island of New Providence; it was estimated that Oakes owned about one-third of that island by the early 1940s. Oakes had become the colony's wealthiest, most powerful, and most important resident by the early 1940s.

== Personal life ==
On 30 June 1923, Oakes married Eunice Myrtle McIntyre in Sydney, Australia. They had met aboard a cruise ship, and she was approximately half his age when they married.

They eventually had five children:

- Nancy Oakes (1925–2005), who in 1942 married Count Alfred de Marigny (1910–1998) at the age of 18. They separated in 1945 and divorced in 1949. She later had a longstanding relationship with British actor Richard Greene (1918–1985), with whom she had a daughter. In 1952, she married Baron Ernst Lyssardt von Hoyningen-Huene, with whom she had one son before their divorce in 1956. Nancy's children are:
  - Patricia Luisa Oakes (1951–2012), who married Franklin D. Roosevelt Jr. (1914–1988) in 1977, with whom she had one son before divorcing in 1981. Patricia later married Robert Leigh-Wood in 1984, with whom she had a daughter. Patricia's children are:
    - John Alexander Roosevelt (born 1977)
    - Shirley Leigh-Wood Oakes (born 1985)
  - Baron Alexander V. "Sasha" Hoynengen-Huene (born 1955)
- Sir Sydney Oakes, 2nd Baronet of Nassau (1927–1966), who died in a car accident aged 39.
  - Sir Christopher Oakes, 3rd Baronet of Nassau (born 1949)
- Shirley Oakes (1929-1986), who was involved in a car accident in 1981 that left her in a coma.
- William Pitt Oakes (1930–1958), who died of an overdose aged 28.
- Harry Philip Oakes (born 1932)

Oakes became interested in golf and, in the late 1920s, hired top golf course architect Stanley Thompson to build a nine-hole course for him, the "Sir Harry Oakes Private Course" in Niagara Falls, Ontario. Completed in 1929, the course is now the Oak Hall Par 3 public course.

== Murder ==
Oakes was murdered sometime after midnight on 8 July 1943. He was struck four times behind the left ear with a miner's hand pick and was then burned all over his body using insecticide, with the flames being concentrated around the eyes. His body was then sprinkled with feathers from a mattress. When Oakes was discovered, the feathers were still being gently blown over his body by the bedroom fan.

=== Investigation and trial ===
The Bahamas’ governor, the Duke of Windsor (formerly King Edward VIII of the United Kingdom), who had become a close friend of Oakes during the previous three years, took charge of the investigation from the outset. The Duke first attempted to enforce press censorship, but this was unsuccessful since the Bahamas Tribune newspaper broke the story to the world within a few hours. Oakes' vast wealth, fame and British title, combined with the nature of the crime, generated worldwide interest in the case. Etienne Dupuch, the colony's foremost newspaper publisher and a close friend of Oakes, ensured constant coverage of the case for the several months which followed. Dupuch had called the Oakes residence early on the morning after the crime, since he had previously arranged to visit, and spoke with Harold Christie, who had stayed there overnight; Christie reported the death to Dupuch.

The Duke believed that the Royal Bahamas Police Force lacked the expertise to investigate the crime, and since World War II was raging, making it difficult to bring detectives from Scotland Yard in London, which was what normally would have been done, the Duke turned to two American policemen he knew in the Miami Police Department. The Bahamas was a British Crown Colony at the time, and there were British Security personnel stationed in wartime in New York City and Washington, D.C. who could potentially have travelled easily and quickly to Nassau for an investigation. Bringing in the Miami Captains Melchen and Barker (Melchen had earlier guarded the Duke in Miami) proved an unfortunate decision.

The two American detectives were, in theory, called upon to assist Bahamian law enforcement, but to the dismay of the local police, they completely took over the investigation. The two American policemen had forgotten their fingerprint kits in Miami, and in any case, the local Bahamas police force did have fingerprint kits available right in Nassau. By evening on the second day of the investigation, 36 hours after Oakes' body was discovered, they had arrested Oakes' son-in-law, Count Alfred de Marigny. De Marigny had eloped with and married Oakes' daughter Nancy in New York City (where she was studying), without her parents' knowledge, two days after her 18th birthday, in 1942. Once she had reached the age of 18, Nancy no longer needed her parents' permission to wed. De Marigny, 14 years older, had met Nancy at the Nassau Yacht Club, where he was a prominent competitive sailor. The two had been dating for a couple of years before their marriage, without her parents apparently fully realizing the seriousness of their relationship. De Marigny was thought to have been on bad terms with Oakes, due to de Marigny's playboy manners and lack of a meaningful career, the fact that he had been married twice before for short periods to wealthy women, and that he had not asked Oakes' permission to marry Nancy. Oakes and de Marigny had quarrelled on several occasions, witnessed by other people.

When Nancy was informed of her father's death and her husband's arrest, she was in Miami on her way for the summer to study dance with Martha Graham at Bennington, Vermont. It was her great friend Merce Cunningham who gave her the bad news. She then travelled to Bar Harbor, Maine, the family's summer home, to join her mother, at her husband's request. But Nancy soon returned to Nassau and began to organize her husband's defence. She was convinced that de Marigny was innocent and stood by him when many others, including her family, believed him guilty. The young countess soon became a favourite with the press worldwide for her mild resemblance to Katharine Hepburn. The murder managed to knock the war off the front pages temporarily. Nancy spent heavily to hire a leading American private investigator, Raymond Schindler, to dig deeply into the case, and a prominent British-trained Bahamian lawyer, Godfrey W. Higgs, to defend her husband. They eventually found serious flaws in the prosecution's case.

De Marigny was committed for trial, and a rope was ordered for his hanging. However, he was acquitted in a trial that lasted several weeks, after the detectives were suspected of fabricating evidence against him. The chief piece of evidence was a fingerprint of his, which Captain Barker claimed had been found on a Chinese screen in Oakes' bedroom where the body had been found. Later, it was discovered that the print had been lifted from the water glass that de Marigny had used during his questioning by the Miami Police captains, and that de Marigny was being framed.

Immediately after Oakes' funeral had been held in Bar Harbor, Maine (the family's summer home), Captain Barker, visiting by invitation, told Nancy and Lady Oakes that he had already positively identified de Marigny's fingerprints on the Chinese screen, justifying de Marigny's status as the main suspect. Very detailed and thorough cross-examination at the trial, several months later, by de Marigny's lawyer showed that Barker had not in fact positively identified the single fingerprint as belonging to de Marigny until several days later than he had originally claimed - after he had returned to Miami - and that Barker had taken several dozen other fingerprints from Oakes' bedroom, many of which were still unprocessed weeks later. An American fingerprint expert witness, testifying for the defence, called into question the professionalism of the techniques used by Captain Barker in the investigation. The expert testified that the de Marigny print very likely could not have come from the Chinese screen, since none of the background pattern design from the screen appeared on the de Marigny print photograph, although other photos of fingerprints lifted from the screen showed this pattern. De Marigny testified that he had not visited Westbourne, Oakes' home and the murder site, for two years before Oakes' death, because of ongoing conflict with Oakes. Several of de Marigny's dinner party guests from the fateful night testified at the trial, and strengthened de Marigny's alibi that he was hosting the party, and later drove several guests to their homes, late at night, with a witness in the car, near the time when the murder was committed. The approximate time of the murder had been determined by two Bahamian medical examiners. Significantly, the Duke of Windsor arranged to be away from the Bahamas while the murder trial was in progress so he was not available to be called as a witness.

Oakes' murderer has never been found, and there were no court proceedings in the case after de Marigny's acquittal. The case received worldwide press coverage at the time, with photos of Nancy in court. It has been the subject of continuous interest, including several books and films (see below). The first full-length book on the case, The Murder of Sir Harry Oakes, was published by the Bahamas Tribune newspaper in 1959; the paper was edited at the time by Etienne Dupuch.

=== Aftermath ===
After the trial, Nancy went with de Marigny to Cuba to stay with their old friend Ernest Hemingway. De Marigny was deported to Cuba after a recommendation by the murder trial's jury, because of his supposedly unsavoury character and frequent advances towards young girls in the Bahamas. De Marigny and Nancy separated in 1945 and divorced in 1949. He moved to Canada in 1945 and served for a time in the Canadian Army, but was later deported from Canada. He married his fourth wife, settled in Central America, and died in 1998.

Nancy had left Cuba by the late 1940s and lived in Hollywood, California, where she had a long affair with 1950s English Hollywood film and British TV star Richard Greene. They had a daughter, Patricia Oakes. She remained close friends with Greene until his death in 1985. In 1952 she married Baron Ernst Lyssardt von Hoyningen-Huene (adopted cousin of the artist George Hoyningen-Huene, the only son of Baron Barthold Theodor Hermann (Theodorovitch) von Hoyningen-Huene, a German nobleman who had estates in Estonia that were confiscated by the Soviets during World War II and was the German ambassador to Portugal during World War II,). They had a son, Baron Alexander von Hoyningen-Huene. The marriage lasted until 1956. Nancy died in 2005 and was survived by her two children and two grandchildren.

== Oakes' legacy ==
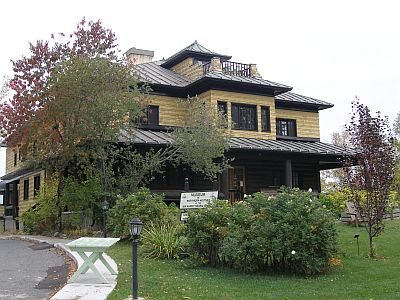
Oakes' former home in Kirkland Lake

Oakes' former home in Kirkland Lake, Ontario, is now the Museum of Northern History, dedicated to his life and to the region's mining history. Kirkland Lake is where he made his fortune as a prospector. He was inducted into the Canadian Mining Hall of Fame.

The Oakes baronetcy of Nassau was assumed by Oakes's son Sir Sydney Oakes (1927–1966). On his death, Sir Sydney's son Christopher (born 1949) inherited the title. A district in Nassau was named after Oakes, complete with a memorial. Foxcroft Academy, a private school in Dover-Foxcroft, Maine, has its football field named after Harry Oakes.

He was portrayed by Scott Hylands in "Rex v De Marigny", a 1993 dramatization of the murder trial for the Canadian drama anthology series Scales of Justice.

=== Niagara Falls: Investments and philanthropy ===
==== Oakes Park ====
During the Great Depression, Oakes donated a 16-acre (65,000 m^{2}) parcel of land in what is now the central area of Niagara Falls, Ontario. He funded a make-work project and supplied tools to build a park at the location. Crews worked for $1 per day, switching every five days to permit as much employment as possible.

Oakes Park was opened on 31 August 1931. It is a multi-use, municipally owned and operated recreational complex. The main facilities are a baseball stadium used by the Greater Niagara Baseball Association and other elite youth and senior baseball clubs, two smaller baseball fields for younger divisions, a soccer pitch, and athletics facilities including a 400-metre track. The main baseball diamond has outfield dimensions of 318-402-322 ft, and has a press box, electronic scoreboard, and clubhouses.

==== Oakes Garden Theatre ====
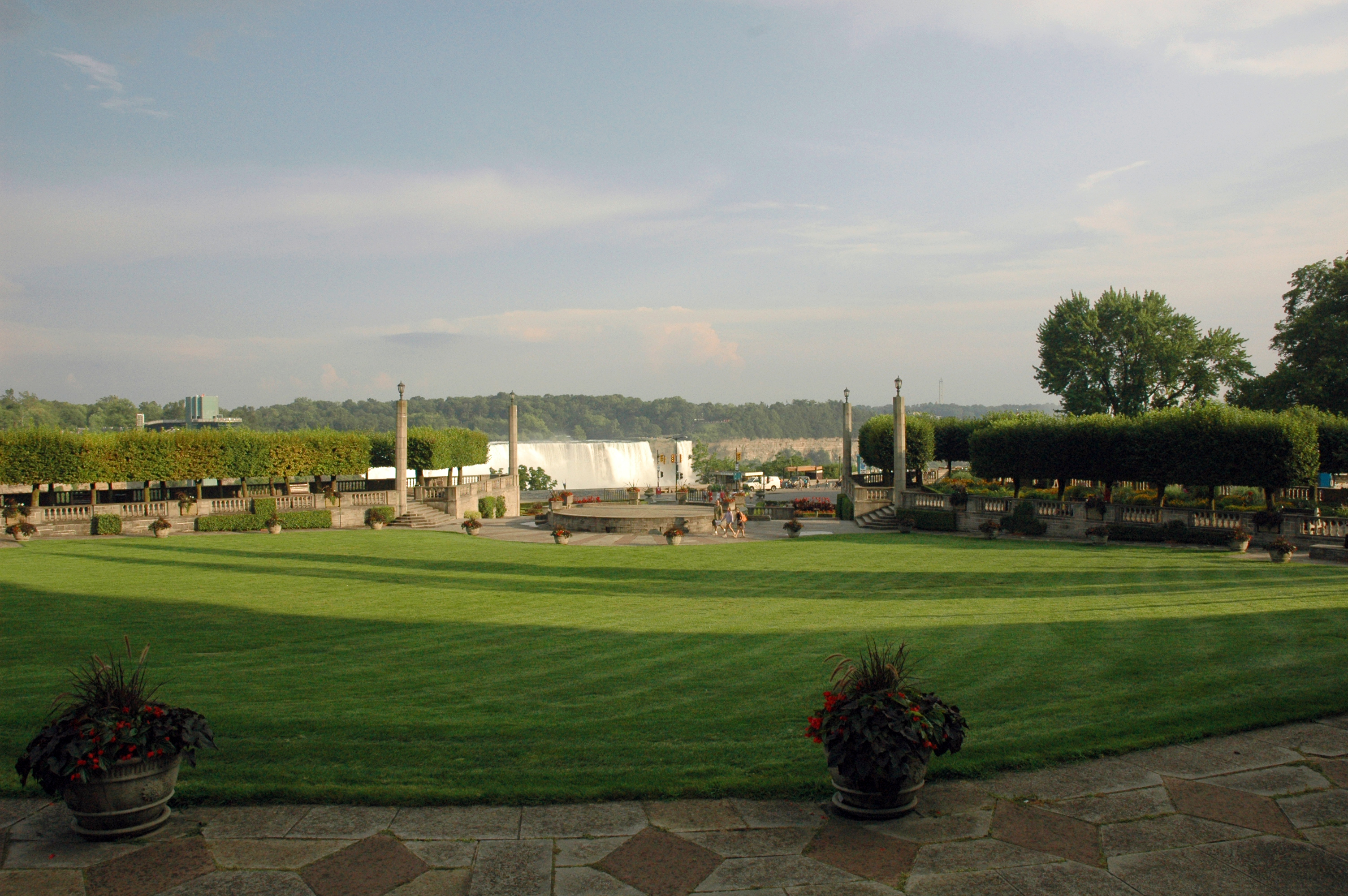
Oakes Garden Theatre in Niagara Falls, Ontario.

Designed as an amphitheatre, Oakes Garden Theatre was opened in September 1937. Oakes, a member of the Niagara Parks Commission, donated the land at the foot of Clifton Hill and Niagara Parkway to the commission in 1936. The landscape architecture was done by Howard and Lorrie Dunington-Grubb, the building's architect was William Lyon Somerville with sculptures by Florence Wyle, Frances Loring and Elizabeth Wyn Wood.

==== Oak Hall ====
Oakes bought property just above Dufferin Islands from the estate of Walter H. Shoellkopf, on 15 July 1924. He constructed a 37-room Tudor- style mansion (by Findlay and Foulis in 1929 and later gatehouse and stables in 1931), where he and his wife lived from 1928 to 1935, known as Oak Hall. Oakes moved to the Bahamas afterwards, due to what he felt was excessive taxation by the Canadian government (85%) - the Bahamas were virtually tax-free. Oakes' son, Sir Sydney Oakes, later occupied the residence. Since 1982, Oak Hall has been the headquarters for the Niagara Parks Commission. A portion of the estate was sold off in the 1960s and is part of Marineland of Canada.

=== American philanthropy and business dealings ===
==== The Willows ====
In 1938 Oakes and his family purchased a summer home called "The Willows" in Bar Harbor, Maine, designed by the firm of Andrews, Jacques and Rantoul in 1913. Lady Eunice Oakes gave it to Bowdoin College in 1958 and operated it as the Oakes Center, a conference center, till the early 1970s when it was sold to brothers James and Sonny Cough. They developed the land and built an oceanfront hotel consisting of several buildings called the Atlantic Oakes. Much of the mansion was significantly altered and covered in vinyl siding. It is now called The Atlantic Oceanside Hotel.

==== Foxcroft Academy ====
Oakes graduated from Foxcroft Academy in Dover-Foxcroft, Maine, founded in 1823, three years after statehood, one of the very few public high school "academies" left in Maine. The present campus is on the former Oakes farm on outer Main Street on the way to Sangerville, his birthplace.

==== Real estate investment in Florida ====
After the disastrous Florida Hurricane of 1928 and the Great Depression, Oakes bought 2,600 acres (11 km^{2}) of partially developed land in northern Palm Beach County, Florida, from Harry Seymour Kelsey, who lacked the finances to rebuild his shattered development. Oakes spent a great deal of money on the development of this property, which was later bought by John D. MacArthur, who completed its development. It includes most of North Palm Beach, Lake Park, Palm Beach Gardens and Palm Beach Shores. Oakes' castle-like home in North Palm Beach became the clubhouse for the village country club.

== Books and films about the Oakes case ==
#	Date	Format	Name	Author/Director	Notes
1	1959	Newspaper article	The Murder of Sir Harry Oakes	Bahamas Tribune newspaper	Published in Nassau by the colony's leading newspaper, which was edited at the time by Etienne Dupuch.
2	1959	Book	The Life and Death of Sir Harry Oakes	Geoffrey Bocca	Published in the United States by Doubleday and Company. Bocca, then working as a bartender in New York City, had met private detective Raymond Schindler, one of his customers, who had investigated the Oakes case for Nancy. Bocca used Schindler's notes, researched the case very thoroughly, and his book was a best-seller.
3	1972 (1st ed); 1976 (2nd ed)	Book	Kings X Who Killed Sir Harry Oakes?	Marshall Houts	The 1st edition (1972 book Kings X) and the second edition (1976 as Who Killed Sir Harry Oakes?) was published in London by Robert Hale publishers. Houts was an American lawyer, and an FBI agent. In the first and second editions of his book, Houts proposed the theory that American gangster boss Meyer Lansky was behind the killing of Oakes, due to Oakes' resistance to casino gambling in the Bahamas. Lansky had apparently already obtained the approval of the Duke for his plans to develop gambling on the islands, after meeting with the Duke in Miami. Lansky was working with Christie, a property developer and Bahamian legislator, and other notable Bahamians, including Stafford Sands (who was the jury foreman at the de Marigny murder trial), to bring this about, with significant new construction of hotels to house tourists as part of the plan. Houts wrote that Oakes had earlier apparently given his approval for the casino project, but then changed his mind by the time of his murder, strongly opposing it. Houts wrote that Lansky sent several henchmen to meet Oakes on the night of the murder. The henchmen were to intimidate, try to persuade, and rough up Oakes if necessary, but not kill him, during a late-night meeting with Christie held aboard a fast powerboat that had travelled from Miami to Nassau earlier that day. But Oakes, age 68, died, and this was covered up. Oakes' body was taken back to his home by Christie (who was spotted as a passenger in his own station wagon by a Nassau Police Captain late that night, a fact which came out at the trial of de Marigny, and which directly contradicted Christie's statement that he had not left Oakes' home overnight), and a fake killing was then staged at Oakes' home, 'Westbourne'. Oakes had earlier, in 1940, allowed the Duke and Duchess of Windsor to stay at Westbourne while their official residence, Government House, was being renovated, and the Duke had slept in the bed where Oakes' body was found. It had troubled Bahamian legal authorities in the lead-up to the de Marigny trial that Oakes' body had apparently been moved, ascertained by examination of blood data, which showed blood flowing uphill, according to the case presented by prosecutors. Houts also wrote that Lansky later privately punished his henchmen who had been involved with the murder, but did not specify the punishment.
4	1981	Book (novel)	Famous Last Words	Timothy Findley	The novel features Harry Oakes as a character. It describes a conspiracy involving Oakes and others including the Duke and Duchess of Windsor, Charles Lindbergh, and Joachim von Ribbentrop. Oakes's murder is part of the fictionalized narrative.
5	1983 (reissued in 2001 and 2011)	Book	Who Killed Sir Harry Oakes?	James Leasor	Leasor's book relates, in parallel with the events of the Oakes murder, the two major events of World War II's Operation Underworld: the security of the New York waterfront after the 1942 fire and sinking of the SS Normandie and the Allied invasion of Sicily. The device is the inclusion of Meyer Lansky's involvement in both the Bahamas tourism development and his liaison with Lucky Luciano whose was the knowledge in effecting the New York and Sicily operations' success. The reader receives no conclusions regarding this authorial construction. It was the basis of a TV movie, Passion and Paradise, starring Rod Steiger in 1989.
6	1984	Movie	Eureka	Nicolas Roeg	The film Eureka, starring Gene Hackman, who played Jack McCann, was based upon Oakes.
7	1988	Book	King of Fools	John Parker	One theory put forward in the book, which was a biography of the Duke of Windsor, expanding on the work done by Houts a decade earlier, is that Oakes was murdered by associates of mob boss Meyer Lansky, after Oakes resisted Lansky's plans to develop casinos on the Bahama Islands. Lansky, together with other major organized crime figures, already had extensive casino interests in neighbouring Cuba. Early in his career, Parker had worked as a journalist in the Bahamas for several years and dug into the Oakes case quite deeply. The two Miami police detectives were suspected of being on Lansky's payroll, and the Duke was warned off instigating a more professional investigation. Parker goes so far as to draw potential business connections between Lansky and the Duke, who had earlier met in Cuba. Parker wrote that the Duke had tried unsuccessfully to impose press censorship of the case from the start. The Duke directed the murder investigation from the beginning, but he and the Duchess of Windsor contrived to visit the United States during the de Marigny trial, so the Duke was not called as a witness. The Duke kept silent about the murder for the rest of his life.
8	1989	Movie	Passion and Paradise	Harvey Hart	Television movie made about the case starring Armand Assante as de Marigny and Rod Steiger (with an inaccurate Maine accent) as Oakes.
9	1988 (1st ed); 2005 (2nd ed)	Book	The Duchess of Windsor: The Secret Life	Charles Higham	Higham wrote about the case in the first (1988) and second (2005) editions of his biography of the Duchess of Windsor. He devoted a chapter, entitled 'Crime of the Century' in the first edition, and 'Death in Nassau' in the second edition, to the case. He carried out a thorough investigation with the assistance of modern experts in criminology. He also dug deeply into archival sources, including previously-classified files of the American Federal Bureau of Investigation. His conclusion in both the first and second editions is that Oakes was murdered by an African ritual specialist from South Florida, who had been hired and brought into Nassau by airplane on the day before the murder, by Harold Christie, a Bahamian mulatto business associate of Oakes. Christie and Oakes, the much wealthier man, had been friends and business partners for many years, and Christie had facilitated Oakes' move to the Bahamas. The two had apparently fallen out shortly before Oakes' death, because of Christie's dealings over the sale of Bahamian property on the island of New Providence, which was scheduled to be used for a new airfield by the Royal Air Force, a project of which the Duke of Windsor would certainly have been aware and involved with, since it had important strategic and economic implications, and would involve large expenses. Christie, a member of the colony's House of Assembly, had been a dinner guest at Oakes' home on the evening the murder occurred and had stayed overnight in Oakes' home on many previous occasions. Christie said that he had slept in a bedroom the night of the murder, only a few metres away from that of Oakes on the night of the murder, and claimed he had neither heard nor seen anything suspicious. Christie had to take the witness stand for an extended period during the de Marigny trial, and his testimony was not convincing to the jury. Christie was later knighted for his contributions to the Bahamas, and died a wealthy man in 1973. He had apparently told close friends several years afterwards that he was directly involved in Oakes' murder.
10	1990	Book	A Conspiracy of Crowns	Alfred de Marigny and Mickey Herskowitz	Alfred de Marigny—the accused killer in the Oakes trial—wrote his own account, along with Mickey Herskowitz, published in 1990.
11	1994	Book (novel)	"Carnal Hours: A Nathan Heller Mystery"	Max Allan Collins	Another fictionalized account concerning the death of Sir Harry, with speculations concerning the killer(s). This was the sixth novel in the historical fiction series featuring private detective Nathan Heller.
12	2002	Book (novel)	Any Human Heart	William Boyd	The murder was fictionalized in Boyd's novel in which a British spy, sent to keep an eye on the Duke, refuses to help the US detectives frame de Marigny for the crime. In 2010 the novel was adapted as a British TV serial of the same name.
13	2003	Book	A Question of Evidence: The Casebook of Great Forensic Controversies, from Napoleon to O.J.	Colin Evans	Details: Publisher John Wiley and Sons, Inc., Hoboken, New Jersey, USA; ISBN 0-471-44014-0. This book was written by experienced forensics author Colin Evans, who has written several prior similar books. Evans writes concisely and thoroughly in this volume. He examines in detail 15 of the most important and controversial forensics cases throughout history, including a chapter on the Oakes case: 'Alfred de Marigny', pp. 90–103. Evans focuses on the Oakes murder and its bungled forensics aspects, including a planted fingerprint, which, when brought to the murder trial of de Marigny, with precise and strong cross-examination by the accused's lawyer, proved decisive in securing de Marigny's acquittal.
14	2005	Book	Blood and Fire: the Duke of Windsor and the Strange Murder of Sir Harry Oakes	John Marquis	Marquis' book was described by American reviewer Art Paine as 'the best written of all the Oakes books to date' and by Sir Christopher Ondaatje in Canada's National Post as the most 'explicitly accusatory' of all the Oakes books. Marquis dismisses the Lansky theories, and claims the murder was strictly a local affair, with white Bahamian businessmen—including Sir Harold Christie—getting rid of Oakes to prevent the movement of his vast fortune to Mexico, a move that would have undermined the Bahamian economy. Marquis, who was editor of Nassau's leading daily newspaper for ten years, also believes the Duke conspired to frame de Marigny by hiring two crooked Miami detectives to conduct the murder investigation. This, he maintains, was also to prevent inquiries by the FBI and Scotland Yard, who he feared would expose his own involvement in illegal money transfers to Mexico during wartime currency restrictions. Marquis makes two very significant revelations in support of his theories: one concerns a passport found amongst rubble in a Nassau street, the other a comment from the Bahamas police chief who was transferred to Trinidad and Tobago at the height of the Oakes inquiries (also used by other authors). He also cites the involvement of the Oakes' family lawyer, Walter Foskett, who he claims was robbing Oakes and was in dispute with him at the time of the killing. Blood and Fire was listed in the Wall Street Journal among the top five books about unsolved crimes.
15	2006	Book	A Serpent in Eden	James Owen	Owen's book on the Oakes murder claims that de Marigny was the murderer. In the December 2006 television documentary Murder in Paradise Owen, the presenter, stated that he had seen documents from the British National Archives that were not intended for public release. They contained details of a Scotland Yard investigation that took place four years after the trial, and which concluded that de Marigny was the murderer. The programme noted that as a possible motive, Oakes had uncovered corruption during the building of Nassau International Airport, and was scheduled to fly to Miami to make a statement to the authorities the day after he was murdered.
16	2019	Book	Murdered Midas: A Millionaire, His Gold Mine, and a Strange Death on an Island Paradise	Charlotte Gray	Award-winning Canadian historian Gray delves very deeply into the life and death of Harry Oakes, in her book published in Toronto, 2019, by HarperCollins.
17	2021	Book	Traitor King: The Scandalous Exile of the Duke and Duchess of Windsor	Andrew Lownie	Scottish historian Andrew Lownie includes a chapter on the Oakes murder in his new, very thoroughly researched work. Lownie cited brief information about a long-forgotten 1959 Canadian TV program on the case. Lownie concisely hits most of the major points made by earlier writers who have examined the case. But he also includes sources which avow that $15 million was missing, and never publicly found, from the very wealthy estate of Oakes after his death. This money had been secretly sent earlier to Mexico by Oakes, for investments there, to escape wartime currency controls. Lownie avers this money was later equally divided three ways, by the Duke of Windsor, Bahamian business and political powerhouse Harold Christie, and the senior banker brother of the Mexican president; these three were supposedly the only ones who knew of the secret transaction. Lownie believes this was the real motive for the Oakes murder, which was likely arranged by Christie, a close friend of Oakes, who slept overnight at his home the night of the murder. Christie stood to lose heavily should Oakes have continued to withdraw money on this scale from the weak Bahamian economy.
18	2025	Documentary	Edward and Wallis: The Bahamas Scandals	Rachel Jardine (Director)	Documentary detailing the period in which the Duke of Windsor and Wallis Simpson lived in the Bahamas, including an in-depth description of the Oakes murder. The release on PBS describes the documentary as: "Top secret files and newly recovered FBI and government records reveal shocking secrets about Edward and Wallis' five-year exile in the Bahamas - ranging from lavish spending to fraternizing with known Nazi sympathizers." For the segment regarding the Oakes murder, the film notes the suspicious nature of Edward hiring the two Miami detectives, and their subsequent probable fraud in planting a fingerprint to unsuccessfully frame de Marigny.

Baronetage of the United Kingdom
New creation	Baronet (of Nassau); 1939–1943	Succeeded by Sydney Oakes
