= Oakes baronets of Hereford (1815) =

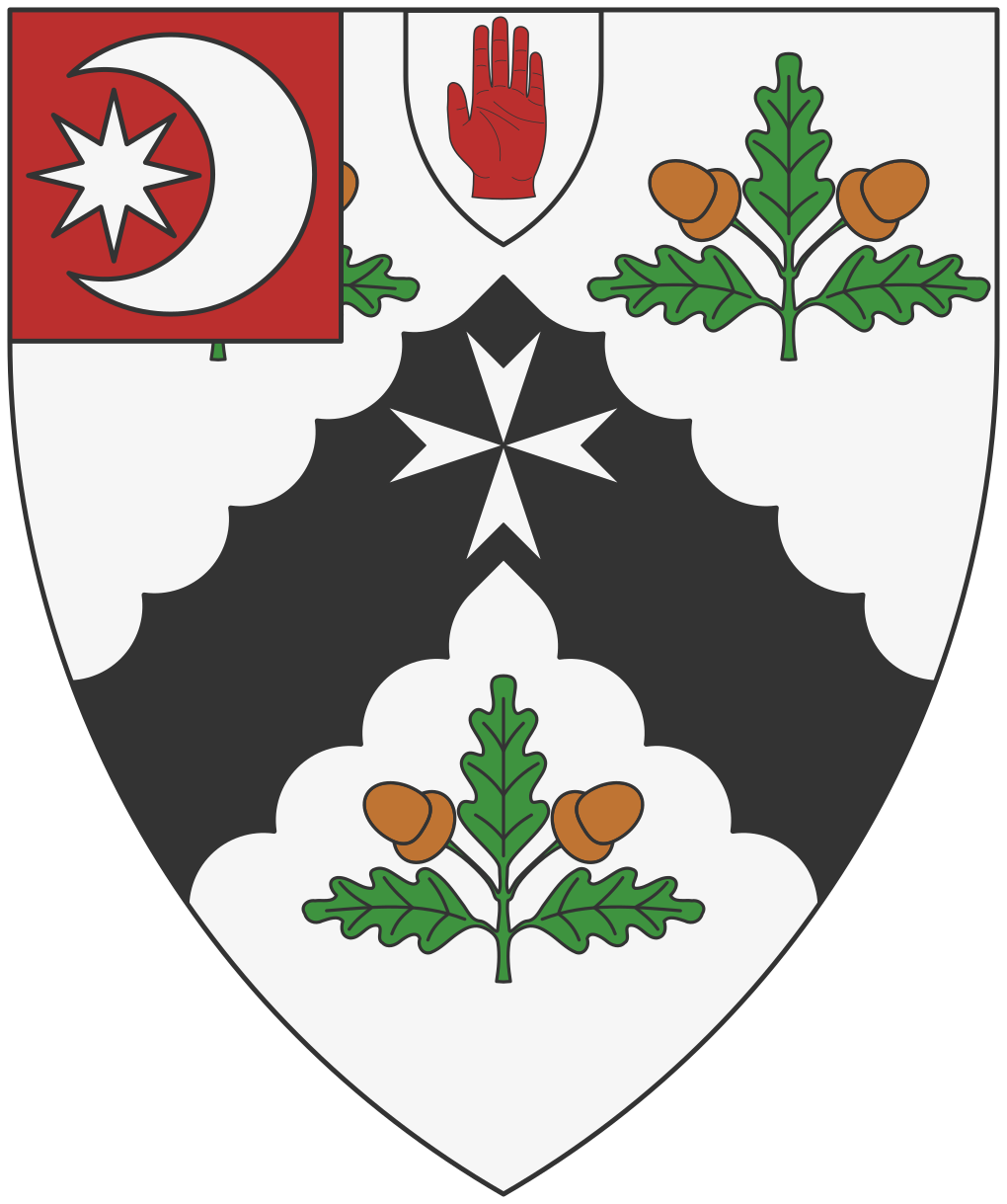
The coat of arms of the Oakes of Hereford, Sir Hildebrand Oakes, 1st Baronet, Baronets.

The Oakes baronetcy of Hereford was created on 1 June 1815 for the soldier Hildebrand Oakes in the Baronetage of the United Kingdom; a second patent, in addition to one created for Oakes on 2 November 1813, it had a special remainder to his brother Henry. The 1813 creation became extinct on his death in 1822 while he was succeeded in the 1815 creation according to the special remainder by Henry, the 2nd Baronet. This title became extinct on the death of the 4th Baronet, in 1927.

== Oakes baronets, of Hereford (1815) ==
- Sir Hildebrand Oakes, 1st Baronet (1754–1822)
- Sir Henry Oakes, 2nd Baronet (1756–1827)
- Sir Henry Thomas Oakes, 3rd Baronet (1795–1850)
- Sir Reginald Louis Oakes, 4th Baronet (1847–1927), died without heir.

Coat of arms of Oakes of Hereford
Crest Out of a mural crown gu. a buck's head erased ppr. gorged with a collar embattled-counter-embattled or. Escutcheon Arg. On a chevron engrailed sa. between three spigrs of oak fructed ppr. a cross of eight points of the field. Motto Persevere

== Notes ==
Baronetage of the United Kingdom
Preceded by Jephson baronets	Oakes baronets of Hereford; 1 June 1815	Succeeded by King baronets
