= Alfred de Marigny =

French Mauritian acquitted of murder

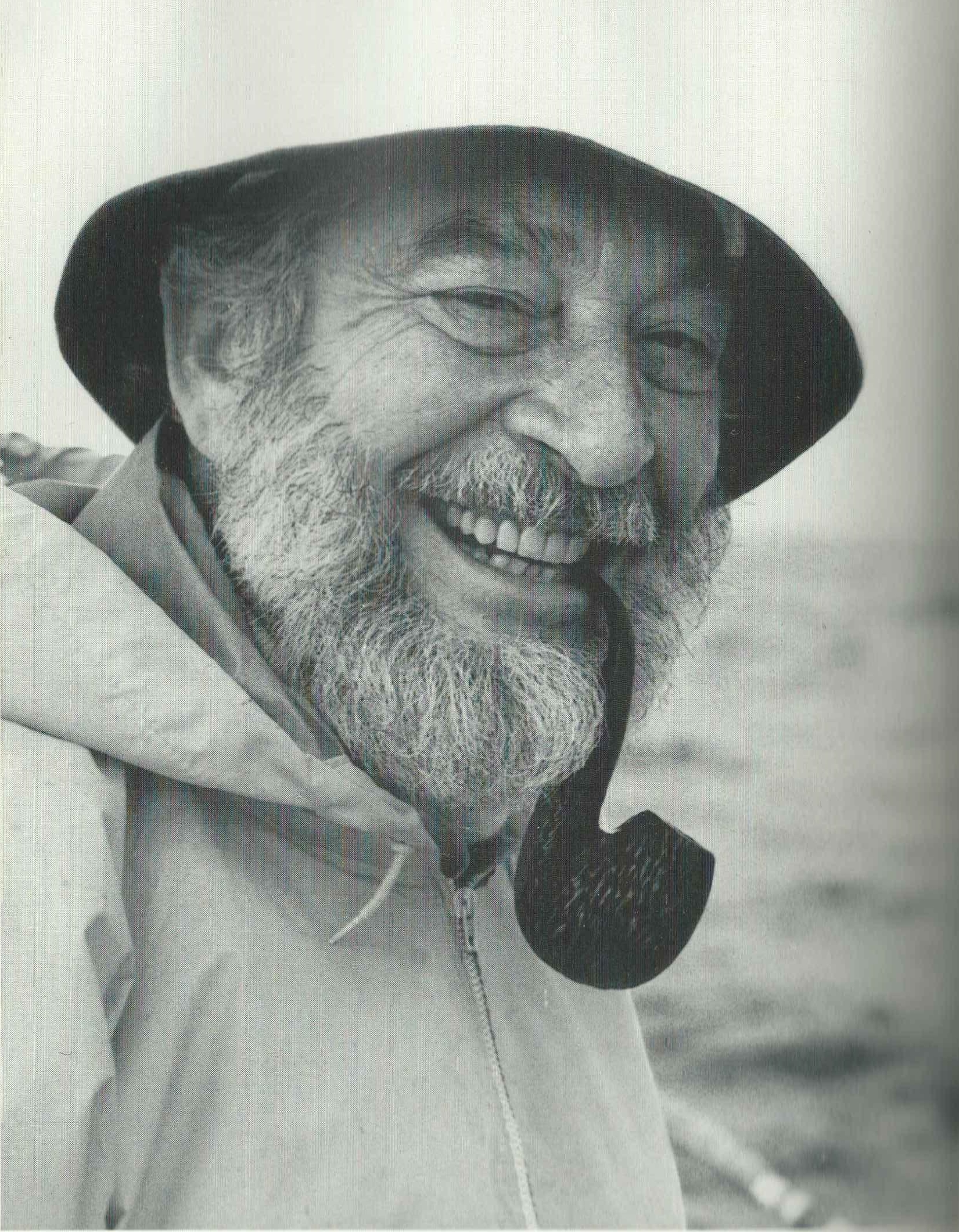
- Born: 29 March 1910; Mauritius
- Died: 28 January 1998 (aged 87); Houston, Texas
- Children: Morgan de Marigny, Philip de Marigny, John de Marigny

Alfred de Marigny (29 March 1910 – 28 January 1998) was a French Mauritian acquitted of the murder of his father-in-law, Sir Harry Oakes.

== Biography ==
Marie Alfred Fouquereaux de Marigny, whose real name was Alfred Fouquereaux, "de Marigny" being his mother's name, was born on 29 March 1910, in Mauritius to a well-off French family. He let people address him as Count, but it is clear that he was not part of a noble family. De Marigny assumed the French title of count from his mother's side of the family.

=== Sir Harry Oakes murder case ===
De Marigny married Sir Harry Oakes's daughter, Nancy, the day after her 18th birthday. They settled in Nassau, Bahamas, where Harry Oakes and his wife lived. It was de Marigny's third marriage; both of the first two were also to wealthy women who broke off those relationships soon after marriage. When Sir Harry was murdered on 7 July 1943, de Marigny was the main suspect and was arrested shortly after. At his trial, detectives which the Duke of Windsor, then Governor of the Bahamas, had brought in from Miami claimed to have found de Marigny's fingerprint near the bed of Sir Harry Oakes. The defense argued that the fingerprint had been lifted and placed in the bedroom. Nancy Oakes supported her husband throughout the trial and testified on his behalf.

The jury acquitted de Marigny of the murder charge but gave a recommendation that he was an "undesirable alien" and should be removed from the island. The deportation recommendation is rumored to have been influenced by his unpopularity among the ruling class on the island. (The Duke of Windsor had described de Marigny as "an unscrupulous adventurer [with] an evil reputation for immoral conduct with young girls".) Following his deportation, the de Marignys settled in Cuba before separating in 1949.

Several books have been written about the case, including one by de Marigny himself. Many theories have been advanced, including suspected mob involvement, but the Nassau newspaper editor John Marquis insisted in his book Blood and Fire (published in 2005) that the murder was strictly a local affair, planned by wealthy Nassau whites to prevent Oakes from moving his money to Mexico. It implicated Sir Harold Christie in the plot and blamed the Duke of Windsor for orchestrating a cover-up by importing two crooked Miami detectives to conduct the investigation.

De Marigny was portrayed by Eric Murphy in "Rex v De Marigny", a 1993 dramatization of his murder trial for the Canadian drama anthology series Scales of Justice, and by Armand Assante in the 1989 film Passion and Paradise. In the 1983 film Eureka, a loose adaptation of the Harry Oakes story, the character "Claude Maillot Van Horn" (played by Rutger Hauer) is based on de Marigny.

=== Marriage and children ===
De Marigny was married four times:

1. Lucie-Alice Cahen for four months in 1937
2. Ruth Fahnestock Schermerhorn (1937-?)
3. Nancy Oakes (1942–1949)
4. Mary Morgan-Taylor (1952–1998)

His fourth marriage was the only one to produce children (three sons).

=== Later life ===
De Marigny went to Canada toward the end of World War II and enlisted in the Canadian Army in July 1945. He lived in Quebec for three years before being deported. He spent various amounts of time in the United States, Jamaica, Haiti and the US again before finally moving to Central America.

He died in Houston, Texas, He was survived by his wife, Mary; sons Morgan and John; grandchildren William, Alexandra, Elizabeth, George, Charlotte, and Mary Catherine. He was preceded in death by his son, Philip deMarigny.

== Published works ==
- More Devil Than Saint (Bernard Ackerman, 1946)
- A Conspiracy of Crowns with Mickey Herskowitz (Bantam/Crown, 1990)

== Biography ==
- Blood and Fire by John Marquis (LMH Publishing, 2005)
- A Serpent in Eden by James Owen (Little, Brown, 2005)
