= Passion and Paradise =

1989 television film directed by Harvey Hart

- Genre: Drama; Mystery; Thriller
- Based on: Who Killed Sir Harry Oakes? by James Leasor
- Written by: Andrew Laskos
- Directed by: Harvey Hart
- Starring: Armand Assante; Catherine Mary Stewart
- Music by: Hagood Hardy
- Countries of origin: United Kingdom; Canada; United States
- Original language: English
- No. of episodes: 2

Production
- Executive producers: W. Paterson Ferns; Leonard Hill; Peter Jefferies
- Producers: Michael Custance; Ian McDougall
- Production locations: Jamaica; Montego Bay, Cornwall, Jamaica
- Cinematography: Albert J. Dunk
- Editor: David Hill
- Running time: 185 min
- Production companies: Picture Base International; Primedia Productions; Leonard Hill Films; HTV

Original release
- Network: ABC
- Release: February 19 – February 21, 1989
- Network: ITV
- Release: August 28 – August 29, 1990

Passion and Paradise is a 1989 American/British television crime-drama miniseries film directed by Harvey Hart and starring Armand Assante and Catherine Mary Stewart. For this film Hart won the Gemini Award for Best Direction in a Dramatic Program or Mini-Series. It was based on the book Who Killed Sir Harry Oakes, written by James Leasor. It was shot in Jamaica.

== Cast ==
- Armand Assante as Alfred de Marigny
- Catherine Mary Stewart as Nancy
- Rod Steiger as Sir Harry Oakes
- Mariette Hartley as Lady Oakes
- Kevin McCarthy as Harold Christie
- Michael Sarrazin as Mike Vincent
- Andrew Ray as Duke of Windsor
- Linda Griffiths as Duchess of Windsor
- Wayne Rogers as Raymond Schindler
- Johnny Sekka as Alfred Adderly
- Tim Woodward as Godfrey Higgs
- Gwynyth Walsh as Lee Kingsley
- Ron White as Lucky Luciano
- Sam Malkin as Meyer Lansky
