= Marshall Houts =

American lawyer

- Born: June 28, 1919; Chattanooga, Tennessee, U.S.
- Died: November 24, 1993 (aged 74); Laguna Niguel, California, U.S.
- Occupations: Attorney; writer

Marshall Wilson Houts (June 28, 1919 – November 24, 1993) was an American academic, attorney, and author.

== Biography ==
Houts was born June 28, 1919, in Chattanooga, Tennessee, the son of a Methodist preacher father. Houts was educated at Brevard College and the University of Minnesota Law School before joining the Federal Bureau of Investigation, where he worked as an agent in Brazil and Cuba. During World War II, Houts moved from the FBI to the Office of Strategic Services.

Later in his career, Houts worked as an attorney and writer. In Minnesota, he served as a municipal-court judge, married, and had seven children. He relocated to Los Angeles in 1951, where he worked as a counsel to author Erle Stanley Gardner’s Court of Last Resort, investigating over 600 murder cases and helping win freedom for 41 wrongly convicted people.

Houts wrote 44 books, including Where Death Delights, which served as the basis for the television series Quincy, M.E. In 1959, he created Trauma magazine, a medical journal used by emergency room physicians, which he continued to edit and publish for the remained of his life.

Houts also wrote a book on the unsolved murder of Sir Harry Oakes, which was developed into the film Eureka (1983) by director Nicolas Roeg. He co-wrote (with Harold Stassen) Eisenhower: Turning the World Toward Peace, a book about Dwight Eisenhower.

Earl Stanley Gardner dedicated his 63rd Perry Mason book, The Case of the Shapely Shadow, to Houts for the "outstanding work he is doing in the field of legal medicine."

== Death ==
Houts died in Laguna Niguel, California on November 24, 1993. He was survived by his wife, Mary, and seven children.

== Selected bibliography ==
- From Gun to Gavel (1955)
- Where Death Delights (1967)
- Who Killed Sir Harry Oakes? (1976)
- Eisenhower: Turning the World Toward Peace (1990; co-written with Harold Stassen)
