= Geoffrey Bocca =

English historian (1924–1983)

Geoffrey Bocca (1924-1983) was an English novelist and historian who resided for many years in the United States.

Bocca wrote several biographies including studies of Winston Churchill, Harry Oakes and Diosdado Macapagal, and covered subjects as diverse as the French Riviera and the assassination of John F. Kennedy in his non-fiction. Bocca wrote two royal biographies on Wallis, Duchess of Windsor, and Queen Elizabeth II and Philip, Duke of Edinburgh.

He also wrote a series of Nazi sadomasochistic erotic novels featuring Commander Amanda Nightingale, an English spy.

Bocca wrote for an English newspaper before becoming a professional writer. He had two children, a son and daughter, George and Natalie.

== Bibliography ==
=== Fiction ===
- Resort to War (1972)
- Commander Amanda Nightingale (1973)
- Amanda's Castle (1973)
- Amanda in France (1976)
- Amanda in Germany (1976)
- Amanda in Spain (1976)
- Nadine (1976)
- Giselle (1978)
- Amanda in Berlin (1978)
- Marpessa (1979)
- The Fourth Horseman (1980)

=== Non-fiction ===
Biographies

- Elizabeth and Philip (1953)
- The Woman Who Would be Queen (1954)
- The Adventurous Life of Winston Churchill (1955)
- The Life and Death of Sir Harry Oakes (1959)
- Macapagal: The Incorruptible (1965)

Criticism

- Best Seller (1981)

Other

- Kings Without Thrones: European Monarchy in the Twentieth Century (1959) (aka The Uneasy Heads: A report on European Monarchy (1959))
- Bikini Beach: The Wicked Riviera: As It Was and Is (1962)
- La Légion! (1964)
- The Secret Army (1968)
- The Great Resorts (1971)
- Don't Cry, Wolf (1973)
- The Philippines: America's Forgotten Friends (1974)
- The Moscow Scene (1976)
- Appointment in Dallas: The Final Solution to the Assassination of JFK (1975, with Hugh C. MacDonald)
- You Can Write a Novel (1983)
