= Oak Hall (Niagara Falls, Ontario) =

Coordinates: 43.0697°N 79.0731°W

- Location: 7400 Portage Road, Niagara Falls, Ontario, Canada
- Type: Historic house museum
- Owner: Niagara Parks Commission

Oak Hall is a 37-room, three-story Tudor-style stone mansion that was built in the late 1920s for mining tycoon Harry Oakes (1874–1943). It is located in Niagara Falls, Ontario, approximately 1/4 mile southwest of the Canadian Horseshoe Falls.

In 1959, Oak Hall was bought by the Niagara Parks Commission and opened to the public in 1964. The estate's original 9-hole golf course was turned into a public course in 1966. The mansion has housed the offices of the Niagara Parks Commission since 1982, and several historic rooms are still open for public viewing.

== History ==
=== Early history ===
The Oak Hall grounds were originally part of the 'Clark Hill Islands' property (see Dufferin Islands). The property was sold off and split in 1898 and went through several ownership changes until Walter Schoellkopf (1882–1955) bought the property in 1916. The Schoellkopf family was from across the Niagara River in Niagara Falls, New York, and they were pioneers of hydraulic power development in the region.

=== Sir Harry Oakes ===
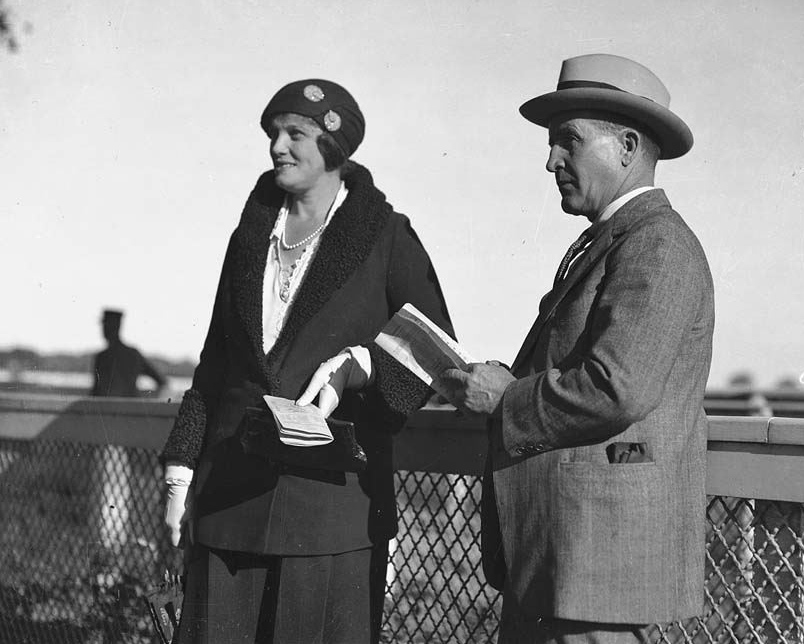
Eunice and Harry Oakes in Toronto in the 1930s

In 1924, Harry Oakes and his wife, Eunice, bought the property from the Schoellkopfs. They hired the firm of Findlay and Foulis of Sault Ste. Marie, Ontario, to design and construct the mansion known as Oak Hall, which was completed by 1928 at a cost of CA$500,000 ($8.63 million in 2023 dollars). Findlay and Foulis were also responsible for the Table Rock house in Niagara Falls, Ontario.

During this time, Oakes became interested in golf and hired top golf course architect Stanley Thompson to build a nine-hole course for him on the estate. The course was completed in 1929 and was known as the "Sir Harry Oakes Private Course." The Oakes family lived there until 1935, when Oakes left Canada (due to what he believed was over-taxation of his gold mines) and moved to the Bahamas.

After Oakes' death in the Bahamas in 1943, Lady Oakes deeded the mansion to the Government of Canada to be used as a convalescent hospital for the Royal Canadian Air Force. In 1952, when the government no longer needed the home, it was deeded back to the Oakes family. Shortly thereafter, Sir Sidney Oakes, the eldest son of Sir Harry Oakes, moved in and lived there with his wife for several years before moving back to the Bahamas.

=== Niagara Parks Commission ===
In 1959, the Niagara Parks Commission purchased Oak Hall and opened it to the public in 1964. Included in the purchase were unique furnishings, including dinner chairs used during a visit to the area in 1919 by Edward, Prince of Wales (the future King Edward VIII).

In 1966, the commission opened the par-3 golf course on the estate to the public in an effort to attract more visitors to the grounds, with the golf course offices housed in the former garage. The commission sought to utilize the mansion more fully and moved its central office in 1982 from Queen Victoria Park to Oak Hall, where it remains today (the golf offices were moved to a gatehouse on the outer grounds). Though the majority of the rooms were converted to office space, three rooms remained in their historic state, with the Prince of Wales' dinner chairs still on display in the dining room.

=== Today ===
It now serves as the administrative offices for Niagara Parks. Currently, the commission's chairman and general manager have their offices on the east side of the building, where Sir Harry and Lady Oakes' bedrooms once were. The chapel, which was built so the family could have private worship services, is now the commission's information technology manager's office. Its peaked ceiling remains intact, and the view from the window includes views of the river and islands below.

== See also ==
- Harry Oakes
- Niagara Parks Commission
