= Oakes baronets =

Set index for Oakes baronets

There have been three baronetcies created for persons with the surname Oakes, all in the Baronetage of the United Kingdom. Two of the creations were in favour of the same person.

- Oakes baronets of the Army (1813): see Hildebrand Oakes
- Oakes baronets of Hereford (1815), Hildebrand Oakes being 1st Baronet
- Oakes baronets of Nassau (1939)
