= Cyril Belshaw =

New Zealand-born Canadian anthropologist (1921–2018)

- Born: 3 December 1921; Waddington, New Zealand
- Died: 20 November 2018 (aged 96); Vancouver, British Columbia, Canada
- Education: University of Auckland; London School of Economics; Royal Anthropological Institute
- Occupation: Anthropologist
- Spouse: Betty Joy (Sweetman) Belshaw d. 1979

Cyril Shirley Belshaw (3 December 1921 – 20 November 2018) was a New Zealand-born Canadian anthropologist and was professor of Anthropology at the University of British Columbia (UBC) from 1953 until his retirement in 1987. Belshaw attended New Zealand's Victoria College where he received an M.A, prior to continuing his education at the London School of Economics where he received his Ph.D. in Social Anthropology. After finishing his education, Belshaw worked as a colonial administrator and economist in the South Pacific.

Following his research, Belshaw made the long travel to Canada where he began his career at the University of British Columbia. In 1979, he was accused in Switzerland of murdering his wife Betty Belshaw. At his trial, it was revealed that Belshaw was engaging in an affair with another married woman. He was acquitted by the all-male jury.

== Career ==
Cyril Belshaw had many academic interests including anthropology of public policy, social organization, economic anthropology, international organizations, communication and completed extensive fieldwork in places such as New Guinea, Fiji and Northern BC. Prior to his death in 2018 Belshaw served as an editor for journals such as Current Anthropology and was an Honorary Life Fellow of the Royal Anthropological Institute, the Pacific Science Association and the Association for the Social Anthropology of Oceania. Belshaw was also the President of the International Union of Anthropological and Ethnological Sciences and of its world Congress in Canada in 1984, and was largely responsible for its reformation. He has worked with the Canadian Social Science Research Council and the Canadian Commission for UNESCO, the International Social Science Council and the International Council for Philosophy and the Humanities.

In 1954 Belshaw published Changing Melanesia: Social Economics of Culture Contact, which focused on work conducted in three different Melanesian territories Solomons, New Hebrides, and New Caledonia. He based it on a thesis presented in 1949 at the London University of Economics, reducing and revising it for publication. Changing Melanesia's content includes partial field work in the course of military and administrative service and partial analysis of pre-existing literature, as well as a brief characterization of indigenous Melanesian patterns of economics. Throughout the book there are chapters based around different topics covered during his research such as "land, labour, and capital", "property organization", and "production and exchange".

Approximately three years later, in 1957, Belshaw published The Great Village: the social welfare of Hanuabada, an urban community in Papua. Based on research conducted while living with his family on the outskirts of Hanuabada from 1950 - 1951, the work was third in a series of monographs Belshaw had written on aspects of social economics in Melanesia. Research was conducted through the fellowship of the Australian University of Canberra and Belshaw's wife Betty connected with women of the community. Unlike his wife, Belshaw did not learn the language and relied on the help of English speaking informants such as Ranu Nihara and Osineru Dickson. Research data was obtained through discussions in homes, tea- parties, and normal village activities.

He went on to publish many other articles and books that include Under the Ivi Tree: Society and Economic Growth in Rural Fiji, Towers Besieged, the dilemma of the creative university, Traditional Exchange and Modern Markets, The Sorcerer's Apprentice: an anthropology of public policy. Belshaw published a three volume autobiography in 2009 and during the same year, extended Webzines of Vancouver from digital publishing to print.

In 2005 he was named World Utopian Champion by SOC.Stockholm and in the following year, published Choosing our Destiny: creating the Utopian world in the 21st Century.

He died in November 2018, shortly before his 97th birthday.

== Publications ==
- (1954) Changing Melanesia: the social economics of culture contact
- (1957) The Great Village: the social welfare of Hanuabada, an urban community in Papua
- (1964) Under the Ivi Tree: Society and Development in rural Fiji
- (1974) Towers Besieged, the dilemma of the creative university
- (1965) Traditional Exchange and Modern Markets
- (1976) The Sorcerer's Apprentice: an Anthropology of Public Policy.
- (2015) Just Do It! Manifesto for the New Age

== Personal life ==
Belshaw was born on 3 December 1921 in Waddington, New Zealand. He attended University College from 1940 - 1942.

=== Murder trial ===
In January 1979 Belshaw reported that his wife Betty Joy Belshaw had gone missing while the two were in Paris, France. Betty had been conducting research on Katherine Mansfield and Belshaw stated that the two had last seen each other when they separated at a Metro station. Her body was discovered two months later by a Swiss road crew near a ski resort in Crans-Montana, where the two had been on sabbatical shortly prior to her disappearance. The body of the 59-year-old woman was found to be mutilated, decomposed, and wrapped in trash bags. Due to the severity of mutilation and decomposition detectives had a hard time identifying the body and contacted Belshaw for Betty's dental records. Belshaw provided doctored dental records, later admitting to making twelve alterations to the records.

He was arrested on international warrants while taking part in a conference in Paris and the case went to trial on 3 December 1980, where Belshaw pled innocence. The trial presided over by Judge Jean-Pierre Guignard, who The Globe and Mail's Marcus Gee stated "jumped in to question and challenge the defendant, making no attempt at the impartiality expected of Canadian judges." During the trial the prosecution questioned why Betty's body was discovered in Switzerland when she was reported missing in Paris and brought to light that Belshaw had been conducting an affair with a married woman who had been present at the ski resort prior to Betty's arrival. They also noted a lack of evidence that Betty had been in Paris at all. When questioned about the altered dental records, Belshaw stated that the tampering was a result of not wanting to admit that she was in fact dead.

The defence argued that the prosecution's arguments were false and that Belshaw was physically incapable of murdering his wife and that there was no evidence to prove that Betty had been murdered, nor any murder weapon. As this occurred prior to rise of DNA testing, the prosecution was also unable to prove guilt via DNA evidence. Belshaw's colleagues and daughter were produced as character witnesses, all of whom expressed strong beliefs of his innocence.

Belshaw was pronounced innocent of his wife's murder by reason of "very light doubt" on 8 December 1980 and following the trial, returned to his position at the University of British Columbia.

His trial was later dramatized as an episode of the CBC Television anthology series Scales of Justice, in which he was portrayed by Robin Gammell, although he publicly criticized the episode for purportedly not being unequivocal enough about his innocence.

Belshaw's colleagues and friends Raymond Firth and Rosemary Firth were at first supportive of him, but gradually came to question his innocence.
