= King baronets of Charlestown (1815) =

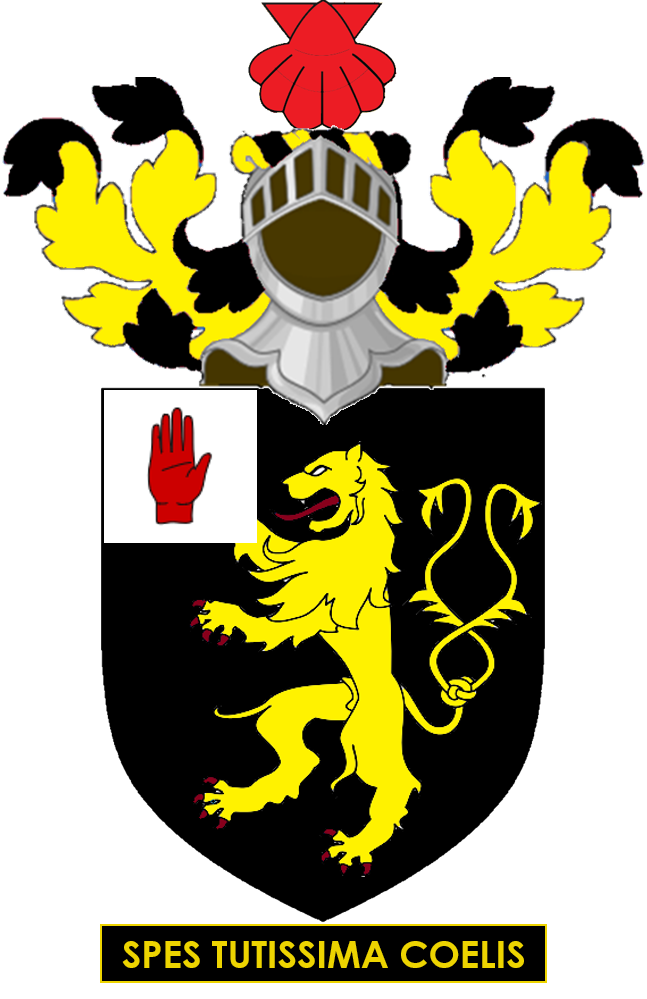
Arms: Sable a Lion rampant doubled-queued Or; Crest: An Escallop Shell Gules; Motto: Spes tutissima coelis (Our safest hope is in Heaven)

The King baronetcy, of Charlestown in the County of Roscommon, was created in the Baronetage of the United Kingdom on 1 July 1815 for Gilbert King, son of Gilbert King (1710–1788), Member of the Irish Parliament for Jamestown, and a direct descendant of Edward King, Bishop of Elphin.

== King baronets, of Charlestown (1815) ==
- Sir Gilbert King, 1st Baronet (1746–1818)
- Sir Robert King, 2nd Baronet (1785–1825)
- Sir Gilbert King, 3rd Baronet (1812–1895)
- Sir Gilbert King, 4th Baronet (1846–1920)
- Sir George Adolphus King, 5th Baronet (1864–1954)
- Sir Alexander William King, 6th Baronet (1892–1969)
- Sir Peter Alexander King, 7th Baronet (1928–1973)
- Sir Wayne Alexander King, 8th Baronet (born 1962)

The heir apparent to the baronetcy is Peter Richard Donald King (born 1988).

== Notes ==
Baronetage of the United Kingdom
| Preceded by Oakes baronets | King baronets of Charleston; 1 July 1815 | Succeeded by Tarleton baronets |
