= Museum of Northern History =

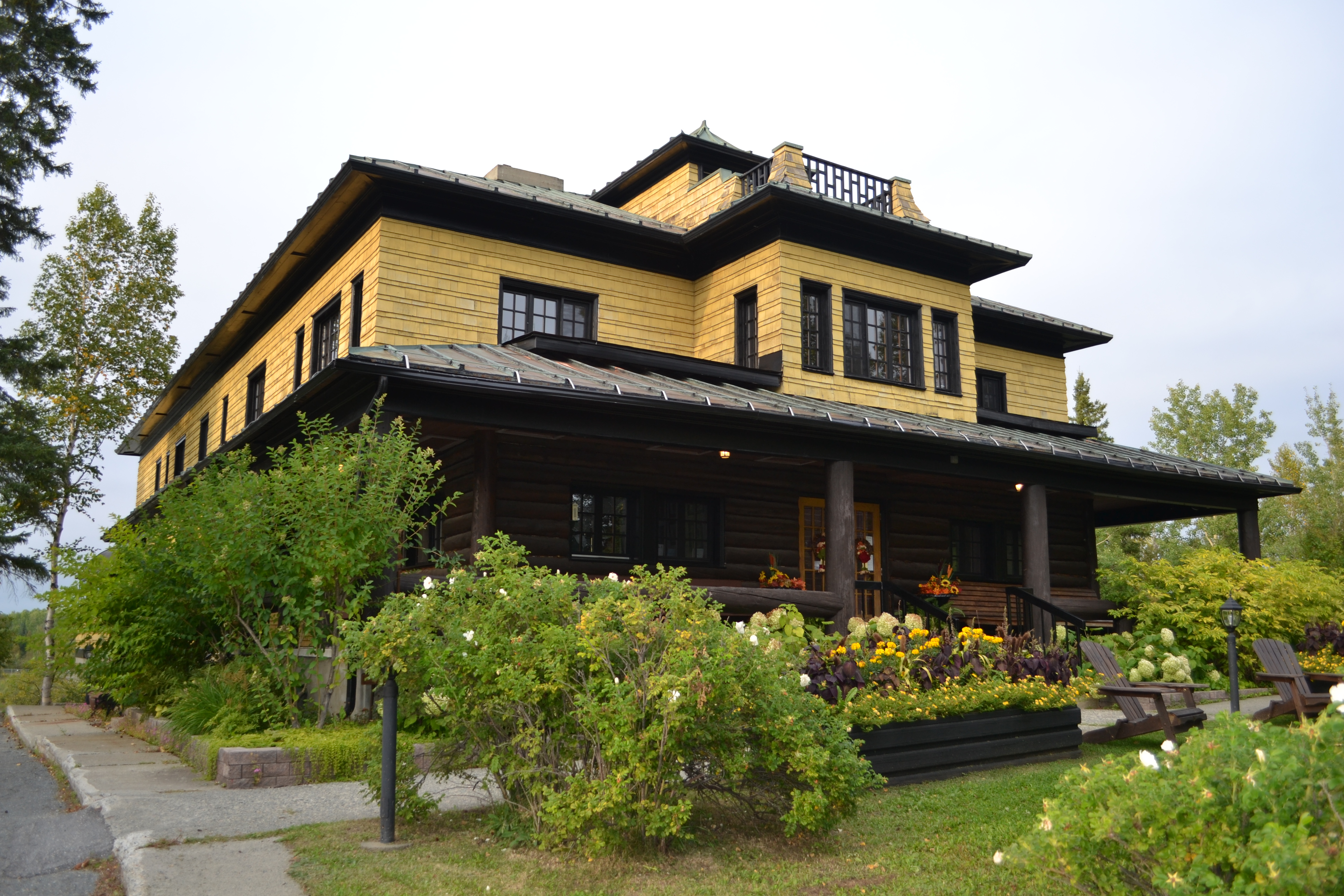

- Location in Ontario Location in Canada
- Location: Kirkland Lake, Ontario, Canada
- Coordinates: 48.148367°N 80.048267°W
- Type: History Museum, Heritage Building
- Collection size: More than 20,000
- Website: www.northernhistory.ca

The Museum of Northern History is a historic house museum located in Kirkland Lake, Ontario, Canada with more than 20,000 artifacts (photographs, objects, etc.) highlighting the social, cultural and industrial history of the Kirkland Lake region, with a particular focus in relation to mining. The museum is located in the Sir Harry Oakes Chateau. The museum also hosts several art exhibitions each year showcasing local talent of Kirkland Lake, as well as regional and international artists. The Museum also holds many arts & cultural events/activities throughout the year and is available as a rental venue for small events, or photo sessions.

The Main floor of the Chateau houses the Entrance, Billiard Room, Art Gallery and Gift Shop.

The Second Floor contains permanent displays highlighting Kirkland Lake and surrounding area history. Displays include: exhibit about north eastern Ontario animals, geology, mining, local businesses, military, transportation, Oakes history, and Nancy's bedroom (a feature of the Chateau).

== Building ==
The building that houses the museum was built by Harry Oakes, a mining financier, in 1929. In 1981 the town of Kirkland Lake transferred ownership of the building to Ontario Heritage Trust and agreed to lease the building for 60 years, covering the cost of repairs.

The Museum briefly closed in 2024, reopening in February 2025 under a new Not-For-Profit, Oakes Project: Heritage, Arts, Tourism (OPHAT). The building continues to be owned by the Ontario Heritage Trust.
