= Goldenrod (film) =

- Theatrical release poster
- Directed by: Harvey Hart
- Written by: Lionel Chetwynd
- Produced by: Gerry Arbeld; Lionel Chetwynd
- Starring: Tony Lo Bianco; Gloria Carlin; Patricia Hamilton
- Cinematography: Harry Makin
- Edited by: Ralph Brunjes; Peter Shatalow; Ron Wisman
- Music by: Franklyn Boyd
- Production companies: Talent Associates; Film Funding Canada
- Distributed by: Ambassador Film Distributors
- Release date: September 22, 1976
- Running time: 118 minutes
- Country: Canada
- Language: English

Goldenrod (also known as Glory Days) is a Canadian drama film directed by Harvey Hart and released in 1976. Based on the novel by Herbert Harker, the film stars Tony Lo Bianco as Jesse Gifford, a former rodeo champion who must take responsibility for raising his two sons as a single parent after his wife Shirley (Gloria Carlin) leaves him.

The film's cast also includes Patricia Hamilton, Ed McNamara, Donald Pleasence and Donnelly Rhodes.

== Release ==
The film had a brief theatrical run in Toronto in 1976, but was withdrawn from theatres after the filmmakers secured a deal with CBS, which aired it as a television film in 1977. Hart won the Canadian Film Award for Best Director in 1976.
