= Scales of Justice (TV series) =

Canadian television series

Scales of Justice is a Canadian series of docudrama television films that aired on CBC Television between 1991 and 1995. Based on an earlier CBC Radio series of the same name, the films dramatized notable Canadian court cases, with actors reenacting the real-life events of the trial.

The series was produced by George Jonas, with lawyer Edward Greenspan involved in the production as narrator and legal consultant, while episodes were co-written by Jonas with a variety of collaborators and directed by a variety of Canadian filmmakers.

Episodes of the series were either one hour or two hours, depending on the complexity of the case being depicted.

The series was cancelled in 1995.

== Controversy ==
Robert Stewart, whose trial had been depicted in a 1991 episode, sued Greenspan and the CBC in 1996 for purportedly violating his obligations of loyalty and confidentiality, as Greenspan had been directly involved in Stewart's appeal of his original conviction. During the case, Stewart claimed that the episode had damaged his reputation in the community where he now lived, as he felt that the episode depicted him as a callous murderer rather than a man who was simply caught up in an accident, while the producers testified that the episode had been Jonas's idea and Greenspan had actually opposed it on the grounds that it would create an appearance of conflict of interest for him, and that he had actually intervened to make the original script more fair to Stewart's perspective once it became clear that Jonas was still going to proceed.

Justice John Macdonald dismissed the suit against the CBC in April 1996 on the grounds that Stewart had failed to show culpability on the network's part. He later found Greenspan liable for breach of trust, but ordered Greenspan to pay just $5,750 in restitution rather than the $77,000 demanded by Stewart in his original suit; however, after Stewart demanded additional damages of over $200,000, Macdonald subsequently also ruled that Stewart's claim of deliberate malfeasance on Greenspan's part was unmeritorious, calling it a reasonable error in judgement, and ordered Stewart to pay court costs to Greenspan as well.

Greenspan subsequently waived the claim to costs, on condition that Stewart release a statement renouncing his prior claims that Greenspan had acted improperly.

Cyril Belshaw, whose murder trial was depicted in a 1994 film, also criticized his episode for purportedly not being unequivocal enough about his innocence.

== Episodes ==
No.	Title	Directed by	Written by	Original release date
1	"Regina v. Logan"	David Cronenberg	George Jonas & Guy Gavriel Kay	January 6, 1991
The trial against Sutcliffe and Hugh Logan, the shooters of Barbara Turnbull. Stars Richard Yearwood and Desmond Campbell as the Logan brothers, and Turnbull as herself.
2	"Regina v. Horvath"	David Cronenberg	George Jonas & Michael Tait	March 17, 1991
The murder trial of John Horvath, charged with killing his mother. Stars Louis Ferreira as Horvath, and Les Carlson as RCMP investigator Larry Proke.
3	"Regina v. Stewart"	Sturla Gunnarsson	George Jonas & Michael Tait	November 17, 1991
The manslaughter trial of Robert Stewart following a hit and run car accident that killed Judy Jordan, with Stewart insisting that his car had been stolen, and was being driven by someone else, despite it having been found in his own driveway after the accident. Stars Robert Joy as Stewart and Sean McCann as his lawyer Malcolm Robb.
4	"Regina v. Nelles"	Michael Anderson	George Jonas & Guy Gavriel Kay	March 1, 1992
The trial of Susan Nelles, the nurse charged in the Toronto hospital baby deaths case of the early 1980s. Stars Jennifer Griffin as Nelles, Michael Kirby as her lawyer Austin Cooper, and David Hemblen as Justice Samuel Grange.
5	"Regina v. Pappajohn"	Michael Anderson	George Jonas	November 15, 1992
The "Champagne & Dubonnet" case of George Pappajohn, a Vancouver business executive who was charged with sexual assault after what he had believed was a consensual sexual encounter with his real estate agent. Stars Kim Coates as Pappajohn, Sherry Miller as the real estate agent, and Lawrence Dane as Justice Toy.
6	"Regina v. Coffin"	Eric Till	George Jonas & Guy Gavriel Kay	January 17, 1993
The murder trial of Wilbert Coffin. Stars Wayne Robson as Coffin.
7	"Regina v. Truscott"	Sturla Gunnarsson	George Jonas & Guy Gavriel Kay	February 21, 1993
The controversial trial of Steven Truscott, dramatizing scenes from both his original trial and his first appeal to the Supreme Court of Canada. Stars Zachary Ansley as Truscott, Kenneth Welsh as the prosecuting crown attorney, and Neil Munro as Truscott's defense attorney.
8	"Rex v. De Marigny"	Michael Anderson	George Jonas & Guy Gavriel Kay	October 31, 1993
The 1943 murder of Harry Oakes. Stars Scott Hylands as Oakes, Eric Murphy as accused killer Alfred de Marigny, Al Waxman and Chuck Shamata as detectives, and episode director Michael Anderson in a small appearance as Edward, Duke of Windsor.
9	"L'Affaire Belshaw"	Eric Till	George Jonas	October 30, 1994
The only episode of the series to cover a case which took place outside of Canada, depicting the murder trial of Canadian academic Cyril Belshaw in Switzerland after the disappearance of his wife. Stars Robin Gammell as Belshaw, Chris Wiggins as his lawyer, and Eric Peterson as the judge.
10	"Regina vs. Gamble & Nichols"	Sturla Gunnarsson	George Jonas	February 26, 1995
Case of Janise Gamble, the first woman in Canadian legal history to be convicted of first-degree murder. Starring Jhene Erwin as Gamble, Louis Ferreira as her husband John, and Scott Kraft as Billy Nichols.

== Awards ==
Award	Date of ceremony	Category	Nominees	Result	Reference
Gemini Awards	1993	Best TV Movie	George Jonas for "Regina v. Nelles"	Won	
Gemini Awards	1993	Best Short Dramatic Program	George Jonas for "Regina v. Stewart"	Won	
Gemini Awards	1994	Best Short Dramatic Program	George Jonas for "Regina v. Coffin"	Nominated	
Gemini Awards	1994	Best Direction in a Dramatic Program or Mini-Series	Sturla Gunnarsson for "Regina v. Truscott"	Nominated	
Gemini Awards	1995	Best Direction in a Dramatic Program or Mini-Series	Michael Anderson for "Rex v. De Marigny"	Nominated	
Gemini Awards	1995	Best Production Design or Art Direction	Alicia Keywan, Armando Sgrignuoli	Nominated	
