= Sir Henry Oakes =

Sir Henry Oakes (1756–1827), 2nd baronet was a lieutenant-general in the East India Company's service.

== Early life ==
Henry Oakes was born on 11 July 1756 and was the younger brother of Hildebrand Oakes (1754–1822), the 1st Baronet.

== Career ==
On 8 February 1775, Oakes received an Indian cadetship, and was appointed a second lieutenant in the Bombay Army on 18 May 1775. He served two campaigns in Guzerat in 1775–6, in the expedition to Poonah in 1778, and at the sieges of Tellicherry, Onore, Bangalore, and Bednore in 1780–1.

Oakes was adjutant-general of the force, under General Mathews, that surrendered at the Siege of Bednore on 28 April 1783, and was carried off prisoner by Tippoo Sultaun. When Tippoo released the prisoners in 1784, Oakes was appointed by the Madras government captain-commandant of a battalion of sepoys (10 June 1784), and, when the battalion was disbanded, returned to Bombay to command the grenadiers of the 2nd Bombay Europeans, whence he was transferred to the 12th Bombay Native Infantry in September 1788, and took the field with that corps in 1790, serving first as quarter-master-general, and afterwards as commissary of supplies. He was with his battalion at the sieges of Cananore and Seringapatam in 1790, was detached with a separate force to Kolapore in Malabar, and was afterwards with the troops under Major Cappage in October 1791.

In 1792, Oakes was appointed deputy adjutant-general of the Bombay army, received the style of adjutant-general in 1796, and returned home on sick furlough in 1788, having attained the rank of major on 6 May 1795, and lieutenant-colonel on 8 January 1796. He went out again in 1802, and was appointed colonel of the 7th Bombay Native Infantry, but was compelled to return home through ill-health. He went to India once more in 1807 as military auditor-general at Bombay, but was again obliged to return home. He became a major-general on 25 July 1810, a lieutenant-general on 4 June 1814, and succeeded his brother as second baronet in 1822.

== Family ==
Henry Oakes married, on 9 December 1792, Dorothea, daughter of General George Bowles of Mount Prospect, co. Cork, by whom he had four sons and three daughters. His sons were:

- Sir Henry Thomas Oakes, 3rd Baronet (1795–1850)

Fought at the 1815 Battle of Waterloo with the 52nd (Oxfordshire) Regiment of Foot. On 1 May 1817, he married Frances, 5th daughter of William Douglas, of Teddington, Middlesex, and had issue. Succeeded his father in 1827 and died 30 September 1850.

- Hildebrand Gordon Oakes (1797-1832), East India Civil Service
- George William Oakes (1803-1873), captain; East India Civil Service
- Charles Henry Oakes (1810-1864) was born on 25 November 1810, matriculated at Merton College, Oxford on 29 November 1828, graduated BA on 13 June 1832 and MA on 10 June 1835, was called to the bar by the society of the Middle Temple on 5 May 1837, edited Who's Who from 1851 to 1864, and died on 16 May 1864.

== Health and death ==
Oakes senior, whose constitution had been completely undermined in India, was subject to fits of insanity, in one of which he destroyed himself. His death took place at his residence at Mitcham, Surrey, on 1 November 1827. His wife Dorothea, died on 24 May 1837.

Baronetage of the United Kingdom
Preceded by Hildebrand Oakes	Baronet (of Hereford); 1822–1827	Succeeded by Henry Oakes
