= Striker's Mountain =

1985 Canadian television film

- VHS cover
- Written by: Wendy Wacko; Pete White
- Directed by: Alan Simmonds
- Starring: Leslie Nielsen; August Schellenberg; Mimi Kuzyk; Bruce Greenwood
- Music by: John Mills-Cockell
- Country of origin: Canada
- Original language: English

Production
- Producer: Wendy Wacko
- Cinematography: Richard Leiterman
- Running time: 99 minutes
- Budget: $2,500,000

Original release
- Network: CBC
- Release: November 1, 1985

Strikers Mountain is a 1985 Canadian action drama film starring Leslie Nielsen, August Schellenberg, and Mimi Kuzyk. It was nominated for two Gemini Awards. Much of the film was filmed near Jasper, Alberta.

== Plot ==
A construction conglomerate, headed by a ruthless millionaire, wants to buy a ski resort that has been a family business for years, but the family does not want to sell. The businessman resolves to get the property, whether they want to sell it or not.

== Cast ==
- Leslie Nielsen as Jim McKay
- August Schellenberg as Jake Striker
- Mimi Kuzyk as Trisha
- Bruce Greenwood as Paul Striker
- Jessica Steen as Lowni Striker
- Steve Atkinson as Eddie
- Caroline Barclay as Sandra McKay
- Darlene Bradley as Edith
- Ernst Buehler as Leo
- Francis Damberger as Bill
- Frances Flanagan as Mrs. Patterson
- Robin Gammell as Rob Wilmer

== Accolade ==
Writer Pete White was nominated for a Gemini Award for Best Writing in a Dramatic Program and Best Writing in a Dramatic Program or Series (Original Drama).

== See also ==
- The Climb
