= Robin Gammell =

Canadian film, television and stage actor

- Born: September 22, 1936 (age 90); Montreal, Quebec, Canada
- Occupations: film, television and stage actor
- Years active: 1957–2024
- Partner: Gretchen Corbett
- Children: Winslow Corbett

Robin Gammell (born September 22, 1936) is a Canadian film, television and stage actor.

== Career ==
Gammell began acting as a junior ensemble member at the Stratford Festival, playing roles including Robin Starveling in A Midsummer Night's Dream, Octavius in Julius Caesar, Ariel in The Tempest, and Malcolm in Macbeth; he later reprised this role for the 1961 television film Macbeth opposite Sean Connery in the title role. He later moved on to film work, including the films The Pyx (1973), Lipstick (1976), Raid on Entebbe (1977), Rituals (1977), Full Circle (1977), The Concorde ... Airport '79 (1979), Murder by Phone (1982), The Star Chamber (1983), Project X (1987) and Striker's Mountain (1987). Recurring or starring roles in television include Wiseguy; WIOU; Street Legal; Amazing Grace; Millennium; Manhattan, AZ and Judging Amy, and guest appearances in The Blue and the Gray; Hill Street Blues; L.A. Law; The Commish; Murder, She Wrote; Matlock; Nip/Tuck; Star Trek: The Next Generation; and How to Get Away With Murder. He received a Genie Award nomination for Best Actor, at the 1st Genie Awards in 1980, for Klondike Fever.

Gammell has also portrayed several noted historical figures in docudrama films and television series, including Walter Moberly in The National Dream: Building the Impossible Railway, American espionage chief William J. Donovan in the television miniseries A Man Called Intrepid, and Adolf Hitler in an episode of Witness to Yesterday.

== Personal life ==
Gammell was in a relationship with Gretchen Corbett. They had one child, Winslow Corbett, in 1979.

== Filmography ==
=== Film ===
Year	Title	Role	Notes
1964	Hamlet	Francisco / Gravedigger / Player #2	
1973	The Pyx	Worther	
1976	Lipstick	Nathan Cartright	
1977	Rituals	Martin	
1977	Full Circle	David Swift	
1979	The Promise	Doctor Wickfield	
1979	The Concorde... Airport '79	William Halpern	
1980	Klondike Fever	Merritt Sloper	
1980	Obsession	Mr. Norton	
1982	Murder by Phone	Noah Clayton	
1982	Highpoint	Banner	
1983	The Star Chamber	Judge Archer	
1983	Nightmares	Bishop	
1987	Project X	Col. Niles	
1991	Guilty by Suspicion	Clyde H. Tavenner	
1993	Dave	Postmaster General	
1993	Sister Act 2: Back in the Habit	Archdiocese Person #2	
1997	Austin Powers: International Man of Mystery	British UN Representative	
1997	Contact	Project Official	
1998	Bulworth	Geoffrey	
1998	Last Night	Mr. Wheeler	
1998	Bone Daddy	Cobb	
2010	Skyline	Walt	
2012	Victory Blvd	Nick's Father	
2013	Lonely Boy	Lou	
2020	She's in Portland	Dennis	

=== Television ===
Year	Title	Role	Notes
1957	Sunday Night Theatre	English youth	Episode: "Mrs. Wickens in the Fall"
1957	O.S.S.	2nd Seaman	Episode: "Operation Barbecue"
1960	Emergency Ward 10	Dingle	Episode #1.305
1960	Armchair Theatre	Wal	Episode: "Some Talk of Alexander"
1960	First Person	Willie	Episode: "A Matter of Some Importance"
1960–1962	Festival	Humphrey Devize / Eli / Octavius	4 episodes
1961	Macbeth	Malcolm	Television film
1961	The Man Born to Be King	John	Television film
1961–1963	Playdate	David / Sean Malloy / Albert	3 episodes
1963	Quest	Veteran	Episode: "The Wounded Soldier"
1974	Dr. Simon Locke	Sutton	Episode: "Man Outside"
1974	The National Dream	Walter Moberly	2 episodes
1976	Raid on Entebbe	Mr. Sager	Television film
1977	Panic in Echo Park	Dr. Tishman	Television film
1978	The Rockford Files	Donald Pilmer	Episode: "Rosendahl and Gilda Stern Are Dead"
1978	The Winds of Kitty Hawk	H.A. Toumlin	Television film
1979	The Great Detective	Lansdowne	Episode: "The Case of the Magic Mandarin"
1979	Jennifer: A Woman's Story	Dr. Bob Symon	Television film
1979	The Lazarus Syndrome	Dr. Meredith	Episode: "The Lady in 534"
1979	A Man Called Intrepid	William Donovan	3 episodes
1980	Lou Grant	Howard Gunther	Episode: "Libel"
1982	Trapper John, M.D.	Dugan	Episode: "The One and Only"
1982	The Blue and the Gray	Jacob Hale Sr.	3 episodes
1982	Wait Until Dark	Sgt. Carlino	Television film
1982–1986	Hill Street Blues	Douglas Comstock / Lt. Patterson	3 episodes
1983	Thursday's Child	Dr. Schroeder	Television film
1983	Deadly Lessons	Morgan Rank	Television film
1983	Missing Pieces	Sen. Lawrence Conrad	Television film
1983	The Paper Chase	Attorney General Patterson	Episode: "Birthday Party"
1983	Wishman	Dr. Harold Wish	Television film
1983	The Last Ninja	Dr. McAllister	Television film
1983	Happy Endings	Uncle John Constantine	Television film
1983	A Case of Libel	Paul Cleary	Television film
1984	The Vegas Strip War	Marvin Berman	Television film
1985	Simon & Simon	Dr. Harcroft	Episode: "Almost Foolproof"
1985	Kids Don't Tell	Dr. Houghton	Television film
1985	The Edison Twins	Mr. Moran	Episode: "The Final Mystery"
1985	Striker's Mountain	Rob Wilmer	Television film
1985	Streets of Justice	Judge Phineas Odets	Television film
1985	Between the Darkness and the Dawn	Dr. Langtry	Television film
1986	The Twilight Zone	Jeffrey Potts	Episode: "Need to Know/Red Snow"
1986	American Playhouse	Cleary, Boyd Bendix' lawyer	Episode: "A Case of Libel"
1987	L.A. Law	Judge John Englander	2 episodes
1987	Roomies	Dean DeWitt	Episode: "The Ditch"
1987	CBS Schoolbreak Special	Tom Webb	Episode: "An Enemy Among Us"
1987	Beauty and the Beast	Lewis Arthur	Episode: "Siege"
1987	Our House	Dr. Hannibal	Episode: "Candles and Shadows"
1987	The King of Love	Arnold Spare	Television film
1988	Lincoln	Stephen A. Douglas	2 episodes
1988–1989	Wiseguy	Senator Delaney	3 episodes
1988, 1992	Murder, She Wrote	Roger Melton / Dr. Thor Lundquist	2 episodes
1989	Everybody's Baby: The Rescue of Jessica McClure	Msha Investigator Thomas Kaye	Television film
1990	Snoops	Gunther Appleton	Episode: "Rough Justice"
1990–1991	WIOU	Kevin Doherty	18 episodes
1991	The Commish	William Sturdivant	Episode: "In the Best of Families"
1992	The Boys of Twilight	Dave Theilman	Episode: "Pilot"
1992	Tropical Heat	Booth	Episode: "Users"
1992	Majority Rule	Stuart Hammel	Television film
1992	Civil Wars	Judge Michael Cassidy	3 episodes
1992	E.N.G.	George Patrick	Episode: "Double Vision"
1993	Matlock	Marvin Estes	Episode: "The Fortune"
1993	Star Trek: The Next Generation	Mauric	Episode: "Attached"
1993–1994	Street Legal	Spencer Garvie	4 episodes
1994	M.A.N.T.I.S.	Doctor Bill Lamar	Episode: "Days of Rage"
1994	Scales of Justice	Cyril Belshaw	Episode "L'Affaire Belshaw"
1995	Amazing Grace	Arthur Sutherland	5 episodes
1995	When the Vows Break	Judge Wendell Adams	Television film
1995	Murder One	Judge Joseph Leyland	Episode: "Chapter Seven"
1995	Net Worth	Conn Smythe	Television film
1996	Circuit Breaker	Dr. Milton	Television film
1996	If These Walls Could Talk	Jim Donnelly	Television film
1996	Jules	Brent	Television film
1996, 1997	Dark Skies	Dr. Hertzog / Dr. Herzog	2 episodes
1996, 1997	Millennium	Mike Atkins	2 episodes
1997	The Arrow	C. D. Howe	Television film
1997	The Practice	Michael Small	Episode: "Trial and Error"
1998	Party of Five	Professor Sinclair	Episode: "True or False"
1998	Eerie, Indiana: The Other Dimension	Mr. Conrad	Episode: "The Newsroom"
1998	Thanks of a Grateful Nation	Clark Nugent	Television film
1998	His Bodyguard	Rollston	Television film
1998	The Girl Next Door	Len Winters	Television film
2000	Manhattan, AZ	Lon	9 episodes
2000–2005	Judging Amy	Judge Salinger	4 episodes
2002	Earth: Final Conflict	Judge Jackson Claridge	Episode: "Subversion"
2002	Strong Medicine	Dana's Lawyer	Episode: "Outcomes"
2005	Nip/Tuck	Carl Harkness	Episode: "Rhea Reynolds"
2007	Saving Grace	Hoyt Garvey	Episode: "Taco, Tulips, Duck and Spices"
2008	Eli Stone	Judge	Episode: "Freedom"
2009	The Border	Dr. Tysdale	Episode: "Missing in Action"
2014	How to Get Away with Murder	Chief Justice	Episode: "Freakin' Whack-a-Mole"
