= Foxcroft Academy =

Coordinates: 45.18447°N 69.24682°W

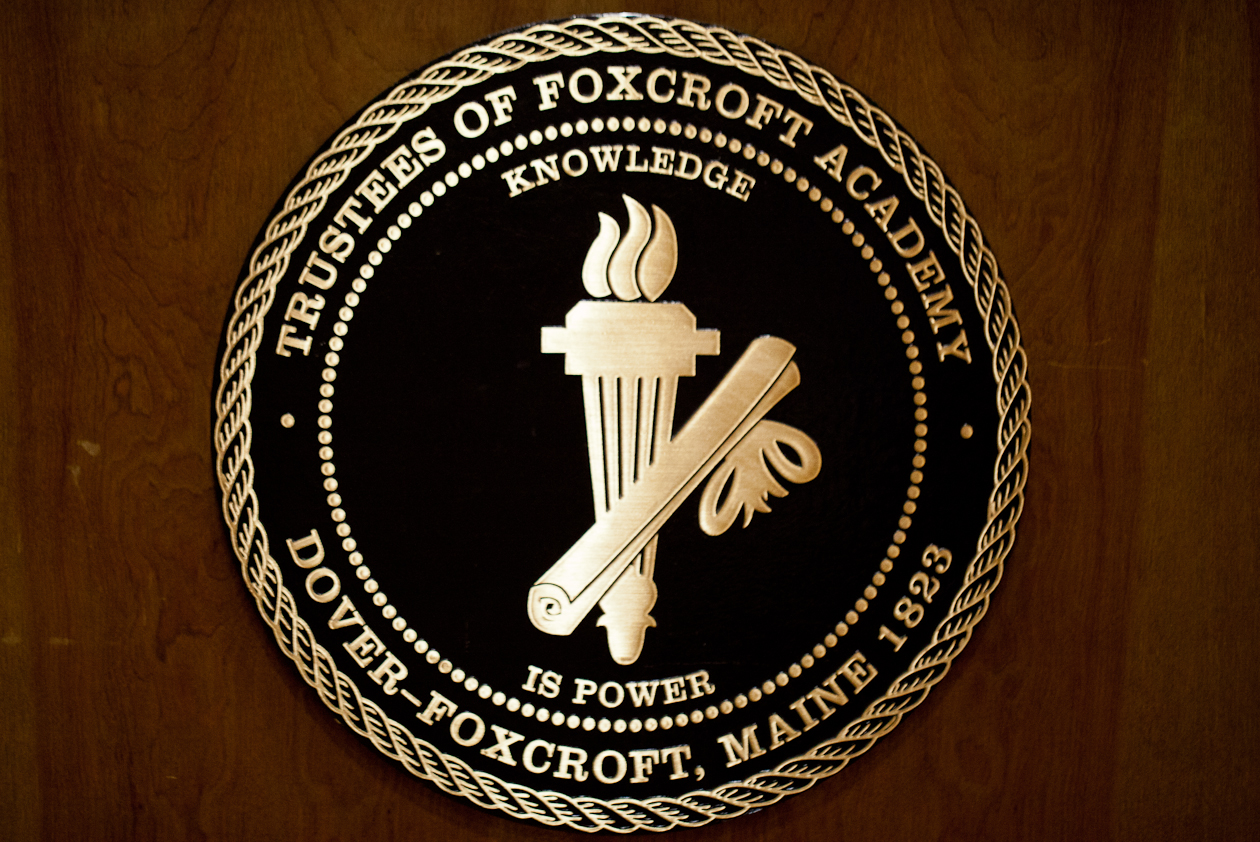
- Foxcroft Academy seal on podium

Location
- 975 West Main Street; Dover-Foxcroft, Maine; United States

Information
- Type: Private high school
- Motto: Knowledge is Power
- Established: 1823; 203 years ago
- Headmaster: Arnold Shorey
- Enrollment: 450 (day and boarding)
- Campus size: 125 acres
- Campus type: Rural
- Colors: Maroon and white
- Mascot: Pony
- Nickname: Ponies
- Yearbook: The Review
- Website: www.foxcroftacademy.org

Foxcroft Academy is a private preparatory high school located in Dover-Foxcroft, Piscataquis County, Maine. Foxcroft Academy is accredited by the New England Association of Schools and Colleges and a member of the Independent School Association of Northern New England, College Board and the National Association of Independent Schools.

== Catchment ==
Maine School Administrative District 68 directly operates schools for grades Pre-Kindergarten to 8, and then sends all high school students to Foxcroft Academy.

The Maine Department of Education is responsible for school assignments in unorganized territories, and it publicly funds schools which take such assignments. It assigns Ebeemee Township in Piscatiquis County to Foxcroft Academy. It also lists Foxcroft as an option for residents of Codyville in Penobscot County and Atkinson in Piscatiquis County.

== Academics ==
Foxcroft Academy is an Apple Distinguished School.

The Academy has 23 Visual and Performing Arts courses: Art I, Ceramics, Sculptural Welding, Studio Art, AP Studio Art, Digital Photography, Yearbook Production, Filmmaking, Intro To Stagecraft, Band, Chorus, Intro to Guitar, Guitar II, Rock Band, Intro to Piano, Jazz Ensemble, Jazz Improvisation, Jazz Improvisation II, Woodwind Ensemble, Percussion Ensemble, Orchestra/Chamber Ensemble, and Select Choir.

== Athletics ==
Foxcroft Academy’s 23 varsity athletic teams have combined to win 21 state titles–11 in the past 11 years–and have also won four MPA Sportsmanship Awards in the past two years alone.

== Notable alumni ==
- Corey Beaulieu, guitarist
- Frank E. Guernsey, U.S. Representative
- Charles E. Littlefield, U.S. Representative
- David Mallett, singer-songwriter
- Sir Harry Oakes, philanthropist
- Henry Otis Pratt, U.S. Representative
- Dean Smith, basketball player and engineer
- Lillian M. N. Stevens, temperance worker
- Lance E. Walker, judge

== See also ==
- Education in Maine

Other private high schools in Maine which take students with public funds (from unorganized areas and/or with agreements with school districts):

- Lee Academy
- George Stevens Academy
- Waynflete School
- Washington Academy

Connecticut private academies acting as public high schools:

- Gilbert School
- Norwich Free Academy
- Woodstock Academy

New Hampshire private academies acting as public high schools:

- Coe-Brown Northwood Academy
- Pinkerton Academy
