= Jephson baronets =

Extinct baronetcy in the Baronetage of the United Kingdom

- Escutcheon of the Jephson baronets of Spring Vale
- Creation date: 1815
- Status: extinct
- Extinction date: 1900
- Motto: Veritas magna est, Truth is great

The Jephson Baronetcy, of Spring Vale in the County of Dorset, was a title in the Baronetage of the United Kingdom. It was created on 1 June 1815 for Richard Jephson. The title became extinct on the death of the fourth Baronet in 1900.

== Jephson baronets, of Spring Vale (1815) ==
- Sir Richard Mounteney Jephson, 1st Baronet (1765–1824)
- Sir Richard Mounteney Jephson, 2nd Baronet (died 1870)
- Sir James Saumerez Jephson, 3rd Baronet (1802–1884)
- Sir Stanhope William Jephson, 4th Baronet (1810–1900)

Baronetage of the United Kingdom
Preceded by Waller baronets	Jephson baronets of Spring Vale; 1 June 1815	Succeeded by Oakes baronets
