= Harvey Hart =

Canadian film and television director (1928–1989)

- Born: March 19, 1928; Toronto, Ontario, Canada
- Died: November 22, 1989 (aged 61); Toronto, Ontario, Canada
- Resting place: Mount Sinai Memorial Park
- Education: University of Toronto; Dramatic Workshop
- Occupations: Film director; television director; television producer
- Years active: 1952–1989

Harvey Hart (March 19, 1928 – November 22, 1989) was a Canadian director and producer of film and television.

== Early life and education ==
Hart was born to a Jewish family in Toronto in 1928. He graduated from the University of Toronto in 1949 and moved to New York City, supporting himself as an Arthur Murray Studio dance instructor while attending Erwin Piscator's New School-affiliated Dramatic Workshop.

== Career ==
Returning to Toronto in 1952, Hart was promptly hired by the CBC, for whom he directed and/or produced over 30 television productions, among them several episodes of an anthology series, Festival, like Home of the Brave (1961) and The Luck of Ginger Coffey (1961), respective adaptations of the like-named 1946 play and 1960 novel. In October 1959, Hart produced the North American television premiere of Arthur Miller's The Crucible for the series Startime, starring Leslie Nielsen as John Proctor.

In 1963 he left the CBC and moved to the United States, where, in the following years, he directed episodes for TV series such as The Alfred Hitchcock Hour and Star Trek, as well as theatrical features, including Bus Riley's Back in Town (1965) and The Sweet Ride (1968).

He returned to Toronto in 1970 where he directed several feature films, including Fortune and Men's Eyes (1971), The Pyx (1973), Shoot (1976) and Goldenrod (1976), for which he won the Canadian Screen Award for Best Director. In the mid 1970s Hart directed four episodes of Columbo: By Dawn's Early Light (1974), A Deadly State of Mind (1975), Forgotten Lady (1975), and Now You See Him (1976).

He continued splitting his time between film work in Canada and television work in Los Angeles throughout the 1980s. He received a Golden Globe Award for Best Miniseries or Television Film for the mini-series East of Eden (1981) and a Gemini Award for Best Direction in a Dramatic Program or Mini-Series for the television crime-drama film Passion and Paradise (1989).

== Personal life ==
Hart was married to Katherine, with whom he had three children, two daughters and one son.

=== Death ===
On November 22, 1989, Hart died of a heart attack at Toronto General Hospital, at age 61. survived by his wife, children, and three step-siblings. Hart's remains are interred in the Pride of Israel section of Mount Sinai Memorial Park in Toronto.

== Selected filmography ==
- The Luck of Ginger Coffey (1961) (TV)
- Dark Intruder (1965)
- Bus Riley's Back in Town (1965)
- Sullivan's Empire (1967)
- The Sweet Ride (1968)
- Fortune and Men's Eyes (1971)
- Mahoney's Last Stand (1972)
- The Pyx (1973)
- Goldenrod (1976)
- Shoot (1976)
- East of Eden (1981) (TV miniseries)
- The High Country (1981)
- Utilities (1983)
- Beverly Hills Madam (1986) (TV)
- Stone Fox (1987) (TV)
- Passion and Paradise (1989) (TV)

== Awards and nominations ==
Institution	Year	Category	Work	Result
Canadian Film Awards	1976	Best Director	Goldenrod	Won
Gemini Awards	1989	Best Direction in a Dramatic Program or Mini-Series	Passion and Paradise	Won
Taormina Film Fest	1977	Golden Charybdis	Shoot	Nominated
