= Hildebrand Oakes =

General in the British Army

Lieutenant-General Sir Hildebrand Oakes GCB Bt
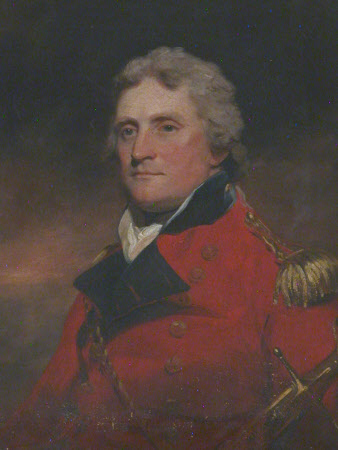
- Born: 19 January 1754; Exeter, Devon
- Died: 9 September 1822 (aged 68); London
- Military career
- Allegiance: United Kingdom
- Branch: British Army
- Service years: 1767–1822
- Rank: Lieutenant-General
- Commands: Malta garrison
- Conflicts: American Revolutionary War; Egyptian Campaign
- Awards: Knight Grand Cross of the Order of the Bath

Lieutenant-General Sir Hildebrand Oakes, 1st Baronet, GCB (19 January 1754 – 9 September 1822) was a British Army officer.

== Military career ==
Oakes was commissioned into the 33rd Regiment of Foot in 1767 and served in the American War of Independence under Lord Cornwallis. He became deputy quartermaster-general in Corsica in May 1794, quartermaster-general in the Mediterranean in June 1794 and quartermaster-general in Portugal in December 1796. He served in the Egyptian Campaign in 1800 as second-in-command under Sir John Moore. He went on to be brigadier-general at Malta in October 1802, Lieutenant-Governor of Portsmouth and General Officer Commanding South-West District in November 1804 and a commissioner of military inquiry in June 1805. After that he became quartermaster-general in the Mediterranean in July 1806, commander of the Malta garrison in March 1808 and Civil Commissioner of Malta in May 1810.

In his final months as Civil Commissioner of Malta, Oakes was responsible for dealing with a plague epidemic that devastated the islands. Prior to the outbreak of the disease, Oakes had already expressed his wish to resign the post on the grounds of his own poor health. He took measures to contain the epidemic, and by the time he left office on 5 October 1813 the epidemic had begun to subside. He was the last person to hold the office of Civil Commissioner, since his successor Thomas Maitland was given the title of Governor of Malta (a post which had been offered to Oakes but which he had declined).

He was appointed Lieutenant-General of the Ordnance in January 1814 and died in office in that post.

Oakes was also colonel of the 52nd Regiment of Foot.

== Family ==
On 18 June 1818, Oakes' daughter Antonia married Edward Wildman (1789-1846), the younger brother of Colonel Thomas Wildman.

Political offices
Preceded by Sir Alexander Ball	Civil Commissioner of Malta; 1810–1813	Succeeded by Sir Thomas Maitland (Governor)
Military offices
Preceded by John Whitelocke	GOC South-West District; 1804–1805	Succeeded by John Hope
Preceded by Sir John Moore	Colonel of the 52nd (Oxfordshire) Regiment of Foot; 1809–1822	Succeeded by Sir George Walker
Preceded by Sir Thomas Trigge	Lieutenant-General of the Ordnance; 1814–1822	Succeeded by The Lord Beresford
Baronetage of the United Kingdom
New creation	Baronet (of the Army); 1813–1822	Extinct
New creation	Baronet (of Hereford); 1815–1822	Succeeded by Sir Henry Oakes
Preceded by Hislop baronets	Oakes baronets of the Army; 2 November 1813	Succeeded by Puleston baronets
