= Oakes baronets of Nassau (1939) =

Escutcheon of the Oakes baronets of Nassau

The Oakes baronetcy, of Nassau in the Bahama Islands, was created in the Baronetage of the United Kingdom on 27 July 1939 for the gold-mine owner and philanthropist Harry Oakes.

== Oakes baronets, of Nassau (1939) ==
- Sir Harry Oakes, 1st Baronet (1874–1943)
- Sir Sydney Oakes, 2nd Baronet (1927–1966)
- Sir Christopher Oakes, 3rd Baronet (born 1949)

The heir apparent to the baronetcy is Victor Oakes (born 1983), only son of the 3rd Baronet.
