= Eureka (1983 film) =

1983 film

- Theatrical release poster
- Directed by: Nicolas Roeg
- Written by: Paul Mayersberg
- Based on: Who Killed Sir Harry Oakes? by Marshall Houts
- Produced by: Jeremy Thomas
- Starring: Gene Hackman; Rutger Hauer; Theresa Russell; Mickey Rourke; Joe Pesci
- Cinematography: Alex Thomson
- Edited by: Tony Lawson
- Music by: Stanley Myers
- Production companies: Recorded Picture Company; JF Productions; Sunley Productions
- Distributed by: MGM/UA Classics
- Release dates: 5 May 1983 (London); 5 October 1984 (Los Angeles)
- Running time: 130 minutes
- Countries: United Kingdom; United States
- Language: English
- Budget: $11 million
- Box office: $123,572

Eureka is a 1983 epic psychological drama thriller film (Note: Roeg himself stated that he intended for the film to defy genre classification, though it has been noted by film critics and writers for exemplifying various elements of epic films, melodramas, and thrillers. The film also features supernatural components.) directed by Nicolas Roeg, and starring Gene Hackman, Rutger Hauer, Theresa Russell, Mickey Rourke, and Joe Pesci. It follows the life of a gold prospector who becomes one of the world's wealthiest men after striking gold in 1925, but, 20 years on, fears that he is being preyed upon by his daughter and her social-climbing husband, as well as a mobster attempting to usurp the Caribbean island he owns. The screenplay is loosely based on the unsolved murder of Sir Harry Oakes in the Bahamas in 1943, and partly adapted from the nonfiction book Who Killed Harry Oakes? by Marshall Houts. The film's title is derived from the 1894 essay of the same title by Edgar Allan Poe.

Roeg and screenwriter Paul Mayersberg developed the film over a two-year period, with an extensive screenplay that at one point ran 1,800 pages. Roeg originally intended to use the real names of the individuals involved, but instead opted to use pseudonyms to avoid potential legal action. An international co-production between the United Kingdom and United States, the film marked Roeg's first major studio project, produced under United Artists. Principal photography began in late 1981 in Barkerville, British Columbia, with additional location shooting taking place in Miami and Jamaica in early 1982. Interiors were filmed in England in the spring of 1982 at EMI-Elstree Studios and Twickenham Film Studios.

Eureka first received a theatrical release in London on 5 May 1983. United Artists temporarily shelved the film from release in the United States, as they were unsure how to properly market it to the public. Furthermore, it was granted an X rating by the Motion Picture Association of America for its graphic violence. The film was eventually given a limited release in the United States beginning in Los Angeles in October 1984 through the studio's subsidiary MGM/UA Classics. Eureka was box-office bomb, grossing only $123,572 against its $11 million budget. It received mixed reviews from critics, with many praising Hackman and Russell's performances as well as the film's enigmatic and surreal imagery, while others felt that its narrative was negatively obscured by its visual elements. (Note: Numerous critics who reviewed the film at the time of its original release praised its surreal and enigmatic visual elements, though some felt that the screenplay and narrative were overshadowed by its strong focus on imagery.)

Eureka is widely regarded as one of Roeg's most ambitious films, as well as one of his most significant commercial failures, though it has gone on to develop a cult following.

== Plot ==
In 1925 Alaska, gold prospector Jack McCann stumbles upon a near-abandoned mining encampment where he witnesses a maddened fellow prospector commit suicide. Later, Jack discovers a mysterious lodestone at the base of a tree before being surrounded by four wolves. Jack seeks shelter at a remote brothel in the mountains, where he has a spiritual experience with the madam, Frieda, a clairvoyant who tells him the lodestone "found" him. Frieda warns Jack that he will strike gold, but that it will lead him toward a grim fate. The following morning, while prospecting, Jack falls through a glacier into a cache of gold beneath. Jack returns to the brothel—now mysteriously empty and dilapidated—and witnesses Frieda, lying alone in the parlor, die. Jack's discovery quickly makes him one of the wealthiest men in the world.

Twenty years later in 1945, Jack lives in luxury on a Caribbean island he owns, in an estate named Eureka. However, Jack's wealth brings him no peace, as he copes with Helen, his bored, alcoholic wife; Tracy, his headstrong daughter who has married Claude Van Horn, a dissolute, philandering French social climber; his paranoid assistant Charles Perkins; and Miami mobsters led by Aurelio D'Amato sent by Jewish mafia crime boss Mayakofsky, who seeks to acquire Jack's island and build a casino there. Jack's life is entangled with the obsessions of those around him with greed, power, and debauchery against a background of occult symbolism.

Tracy, caught in the midst of her father's hostility toward Claude, eventually decides to break ties with him. This results in Jack lashing out at both Claude and her, whom he comes to believe want to "steal his soul". Meanwhile, under Mayakofsky's supervision, Aurelio continues to vie for Jack's island, but Jack resists their attempts. One night during a rainstorm, Claude and three of his friends attend a Voodoo ritual that descends into a maddening orgy. The same night, Aurelio, along with several of his henchmen—including an associate named Pete—arrive on the island and travel to Eureka at Mayakofsky's order. Jack remains defiant against their attempts to strongarm him and take ownership of the island. Pete brutally attacks Jack, bludgeoning him in the head with a wrench before burning him alive with a blowtorch as he lay helpless in his bed, and then decapitating his corpse with a cleaver. The vicious murder is witnessed by Claude, who returns to the house in the midst of it, as well as by Charles, who was sleeping in an adjacent bedroom.

Claude is swiftly apprehended by authorities, who believe him to be Jack's killer, and he is put on trial for murder. After several witnesses give testimony, including a dramatic testimony from Tracy, Claude is ultimately acquitted of Jack's murder due to lack of evidence. His acquittal coincides with the end of the Caribbean War, but the judge notifies him that he will be deported from the island. Claude and Tracy celebrate his freedom with a formal dinner, during which Claude proposes that they sell Eureka and move to France. Tracy responds that she wishes to give the entire island away for free. Claude, after realizing he will only bring Tracy pain, leaves the house and takes a rowboat to his sailboat anchored offshore as Tracy watches in tears. Jack's murder remains formally unsolved.

== Cast ==
- Gene Hackman as Jack McCann
- Theresa Russell as Tracy McCann-Maillot Van Horn
- Rutger Hauer as Claude Maillot Van Horn
- Jane Lapotaire as Helen McCann
- Mickey Rourke as Aurelio D'Amato
- Ed Lauter as Charles Perkins
- Joe Pesci as Mayakofsky
- Helena Kallianiotes as Frieda
- Joe Spinell as Pete
- James Faulkner as Roger
- Corin Redgrave as Worsley
- Emma Relph as Mary
- Frank Pesce as Stefano
- Cavan Kendall as Pierre de Valois
- Emrys James as Judge
- Timothy Scott as Webb
- Ian Tracey as Joey
- Tommy Lane as Miami chauffeur

== Analysis and themes ==
=== Materialism ===
Writer Robert Shail characterizes the film as "a mesmerising analysis of false materialistic values". Biographer Joseph Lanza writes in Fragile Geometry: The Films, Philosophy, and Misadventures of Nicolas Roeg (1989) that the film's structure resembles that of Goethe's Faust, noting that the Jack McCann character "strives for earthly power at the risk of losing his soul". Lanza interprets McCann as a stand-in for Faust, with Frieda, the prostitute who helps lead McCann to the gold, serving as a foil for Gretchen, whose "love has no place in the hero's demonic mission". Paul Mayersberg, the film's screenwriter, identified McCann's search for gold as a metaphor for the human desire for "self-realisation".

Additionally, critic Jim Leach cites the dissolution of familial relationships as a key theme in Eureka, writing that the McCann family's "tensions take on the archetypal dimensions of Greek tragedy and Freudian psychodrama". Leach connects this theme to its visual style as well, commenting that "the forces of disorder dominate the film's imagery and structure".

=== Mythology and spirituality ===
Lanza notes that, unlike some of Roeg's previous films which do not center around a singular mythology, "Eureka draws generously from Kabbalah, alchemy and semi-historical Germanic tales", and describes the film as a "religious amalgam" containing clashes between various spiritual beliefs and ideologies. According to Lanza, McCann's search for fortune represents a "Wagnerian quest" similar that of Prince Siegfrid in Wagner's play Der Ring des Nibelungen, which is in turn based on the German folk legend Nibelungenlied. Lanza suggests that McCann's rival in the film, the Jewish gangster Mayakofsky, exhibits a "Semitic worldview" that "mixes Old Testament retribution with Freudianism". Mayakofsky, who seeks to gain control of Eureka through means of psychological manipulation, ridicules McCann for "having no faith in a world where "there is only one God among us schmucks"".

Screenwriter Mayersberg commented on the film's spiritual and religious themes:

In Eureka, we took God as if it were no different from devil worship or anything else. Mayakofsky relies on God to justify his evil ends. Everybody, you'll notice, has a kind of religious tone to them; except for Jack, and even he has a vague kind of Christian view when he says, "Do unto others as you would have them do unto you." We wanted to show that, underlying all behavior, is a religious attitude. We can't separate ourselves from it.

In Lanza's interpretation of the film, he writes that "Roeg's attempt to meld ideologies and myths backfires", noting that the unflattering depiction of Mayakofsky drew some accusations of anti-semitism. Lanza contests the accusations that the depiction reflects an anti-semitic stance from Roeg, citing the fact that, while filming a scene featuring Mayakofsky in a synagogue, Roeg was the sole crew member to wear a yarmulke out of respect.

== Production ==
=== Development ===
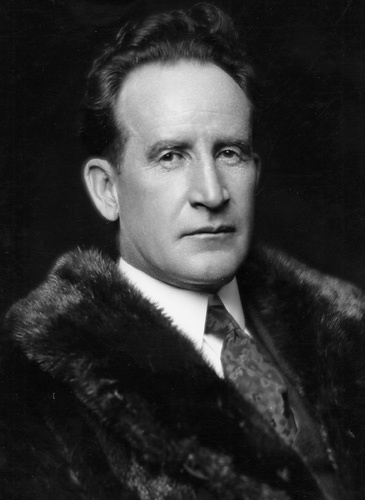
The film is based on the 1943 unsolved murder of Harry Oakes, and was partly adapted by Marshall Houts's book on the subject

Director Nicolas Roeg was inspired to make a film about the 1943 murder of Sir Harry Oakes after reading the nonfiction book Who Killed Harry Oakes? by Marshall Houts. Roeg pitched the project to Metro-Goldwyn-Mayer (MGM)/United Artists executive David Begelman, and approached screenwriter Paul Mayersberg to write a screenplay adaptation of Houts's book. Commenting on Roeg's inception of the film, Mayersberg recalled:

When Nic first proposed this story to me, he had one image in mind. Just one. And that was the scene where Jack McCann and his daughter are sitting in a car, many years after the gold strike. He had been showing her where it all happened. As the car drives off, he looks out of the window and sees the icy peaks of his earlier days. When she looks out of her window, she sees a shining blue sea, the Caribbean, which is where they live now. That image was the origin of the film. One looks back, the other looks forward. They are both in the same place at the same time.

Eureka will have the quality of a small, intimate story, but in an epic, even operatic setting. It's a film that must be seen on the big screen.

— Roeg on his vision of the film

Over a two year period, Roeg and Mayersberg collaborated on a screenplay that at one point ran up to approximately 1,800 pages. The original draft used the real names of the individuals involved, which was cleared by MGM's legal department, despite the fact that Oakes's daughter, Edith Nancy Lewis, was still alive at the time. In order to avoid the potential of legal action, however, Roeg and Mayersberg opted to use fictional names in subsequent drafts. Roeg envisioned a narrative in which the lead character, Jack McCann, does not stumble upon his fortune of gold arbitrarily, but is instead led to it by supernatural means; this plot element was incorporated through the introduction of a clairvoyant prostitute who directs McCann to the gold cache. Mayersberg noted that this lent an "occult" dimension to the story as opposed to a straightforward rags to riches narrative followed by interpersonal collapse.

The film's original working title was Murder, Mystery. The title was eventually changed to Eureka, inspired by the 1894 essay of the same title by Edgar Allan Poe about the mysteries of the universe. In a 1983 interview, Roeg stated that he aspired to make a film that defied genre expectations: "I wanted to make a film about ecstasy, the many forms of ecstasy. Ecstasy in individual people, and ecstasy as the mystic sense of life. How our actions are connected to everything and everyone around us. It's not a mystery film, it's not a thriller. And I hope you can't put it into a slot. There isn't a slot to put it in. To do so would make it a thing it isn't".

=== Casting ===
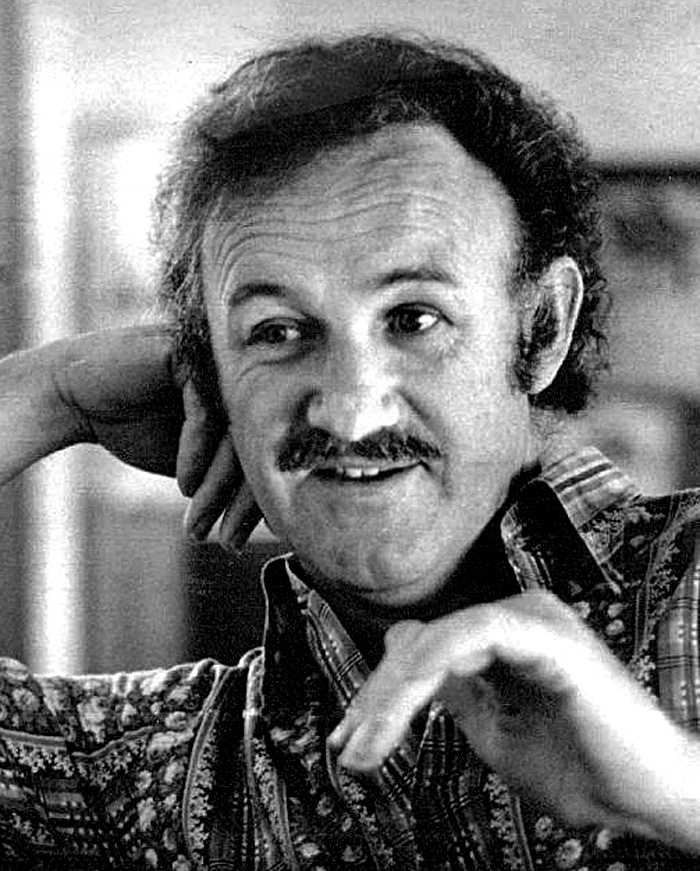
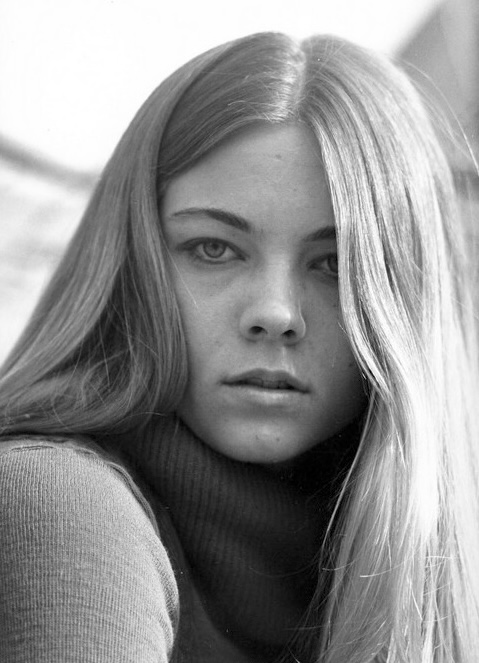
Gene Hackman and Theresa Russell were cast in the principal roles of father and daughter Jack and Tracy McCann.

Gene Hackman was cast in the lead role of Jack McCann in early December 1981. Hackman was drawn to the project partly due to his appreciation of Roeg's previous films, as well as the challenge of portraying a character in two different points in his life decades apart. Theresa Russell, who had previously starred in Roeg's Bad Timing (1980), was cast opposite Hackman portraying McCann's daughter, Tracy.

Rutger Hauer was concurrently cast as Claude Maillot Van Horn, the social-climbing husband of Tracy, while Joe Pesci was cast in the role of Mayakofsky, a crime boss seeking to usurp McCann's island and his lavish estate to build a casino. The Mayakofsky character was loosely based on Jewish mob member Meyer Lansky. In the respective roles of Mayakofsky's henchmen Aurelio D'Amato and Pete, Mickey Rourke and Joe Spinell were cast.

Ed Lauter appears in the film as McCann's paranoid assistant, Charles Perkins, while Jane Lapotaire portrays McCann's wife, Helen. Helena Kallianiotes was cast in the role of Frieda, a mysterious brothel madam who directs McCann to his fortune. Annie Kidder, sister of actress Margot Kidder, has a minor role in the film.

=== Filming ===
Eureka was filmed between late 1981 and mid-1982 on a budget of $11 million, marking Roeg's most expensive film production to date. It also marked Roeg's first feature shot by cinematographer Alex Thomson, after numerous collaborations with Anthony B. Richmond. Roeg biographer Joseph Lanza observes that Thomson's cinematography exhibits a "harsher contrast" as opposed to the "dreamy look" captured by Richmond on Roeg's previous films, such as Don't Look Now (1973), The Man Who Fell to Earth (1976), and Bad Timing (1980). Lanza describes Thomson's cinematography in the film as "more conventional", but concludes that it "remains chilling".

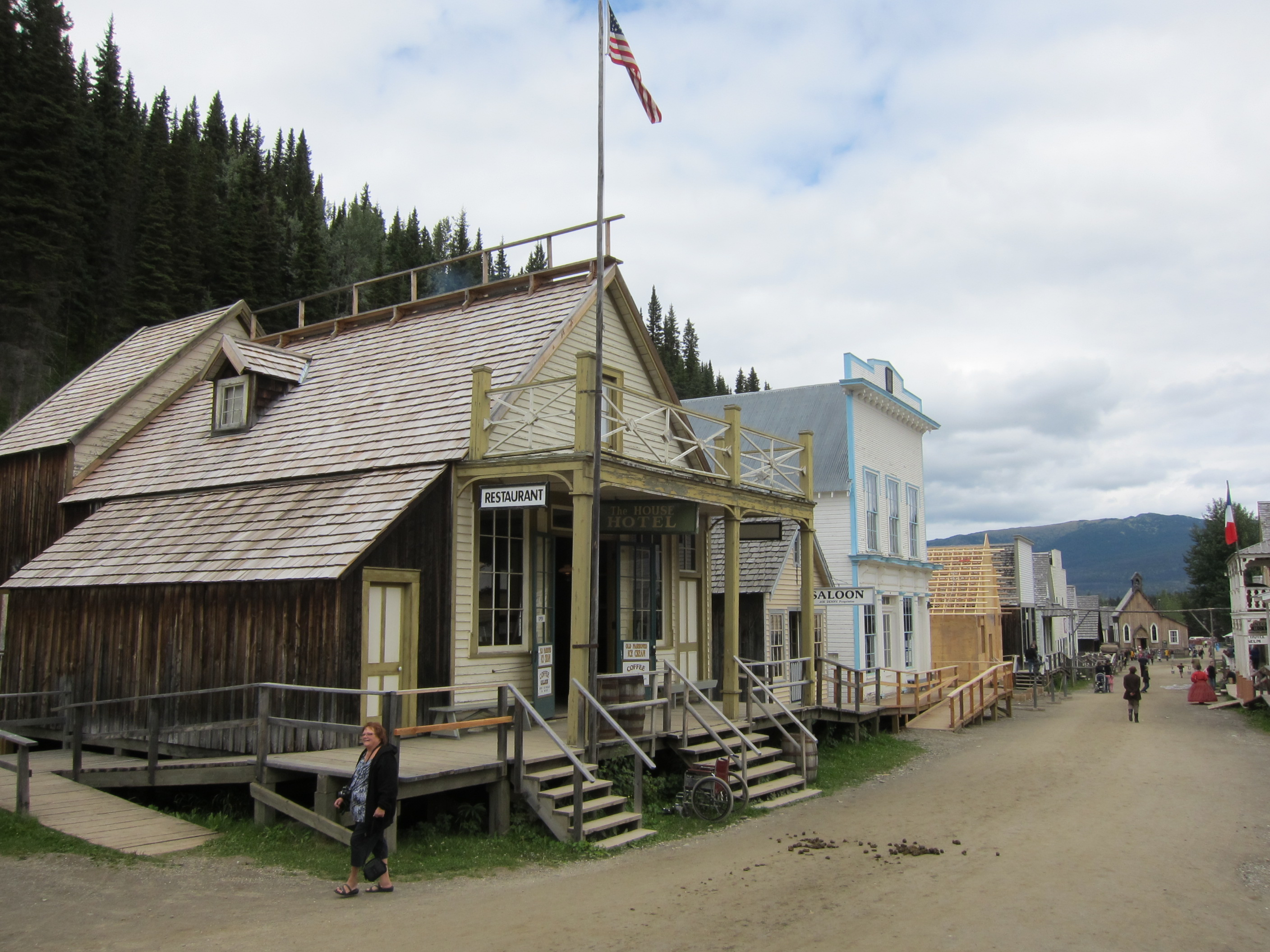
Filming partly took place in Barkerville, British Columbia

Location shooting began in the historic gold rush community of Barkerville, British Columbia between late October and late December 1981, with much of the same crew who had recently completed Raiders of the Lost Ark. Additional filming took place in January 1982 at Mount Robson in the Canadian Rockies. During the Canadian shoot, the cast and crew encountered a major snowstorm—the worst the region had experienced in fifty years—which problematized the production, resulting in snowdrifts exceeding 3.048 metres (10 ft) and temperatures as low as −40 °C (−40 °F).

By late February 1982, location shooting was underway in Jamaica at the Roaring River Great House and Great Hope Estate. Additional photography occurred in the United States in Miami, Florida, including at the Beth Jacob Social Hall and Congregation in Miami Beach.

For the film's Voodoo ritual sequence, Roeg consulted Haitian magicians in order for its depiction to appear authentic. Beginning in April 1982, interior studio filming took place at EMI-Elstree Studios and Twickenham Film Studios in London, England.

During filming, Hackman and Roeg frequently clashed, with Hackman being significantly focused on elements of the film's art direction and cinematography. Roeg shot the film using a single camera and took time setting up and lighting each shot individually, often capturing multiple takes from different camera angles. Hackman disliked this method, preferring to work with multiple cameras rolling concurrently, and not completing more than two takes of a scene. Russell recalled of her casting and chemistry with Hackman: "I got along with him very well, but he was a difficult man. He was mean; he was an unpleasant person. He really was... He was driving Nic crazy when he always talked about his lines. I don’t know why, but some people just make everybody scared and crazy. So it was very tough. It was tougher on Nic because he needed him for that character. And Gene Hackman needed that negative energy in order to create, which is a really bad thing".

== Music ==
Stanley Myers was hired to compose the musical score for Eureka, which features "eerie atonal themes" mixed with "syrupy soundtracks to make the film go from being overly sentimental to ice cold". Though uncredited, Hans Zimmer served as an assistant to Myers during the score's composition and recording.

== Release ==
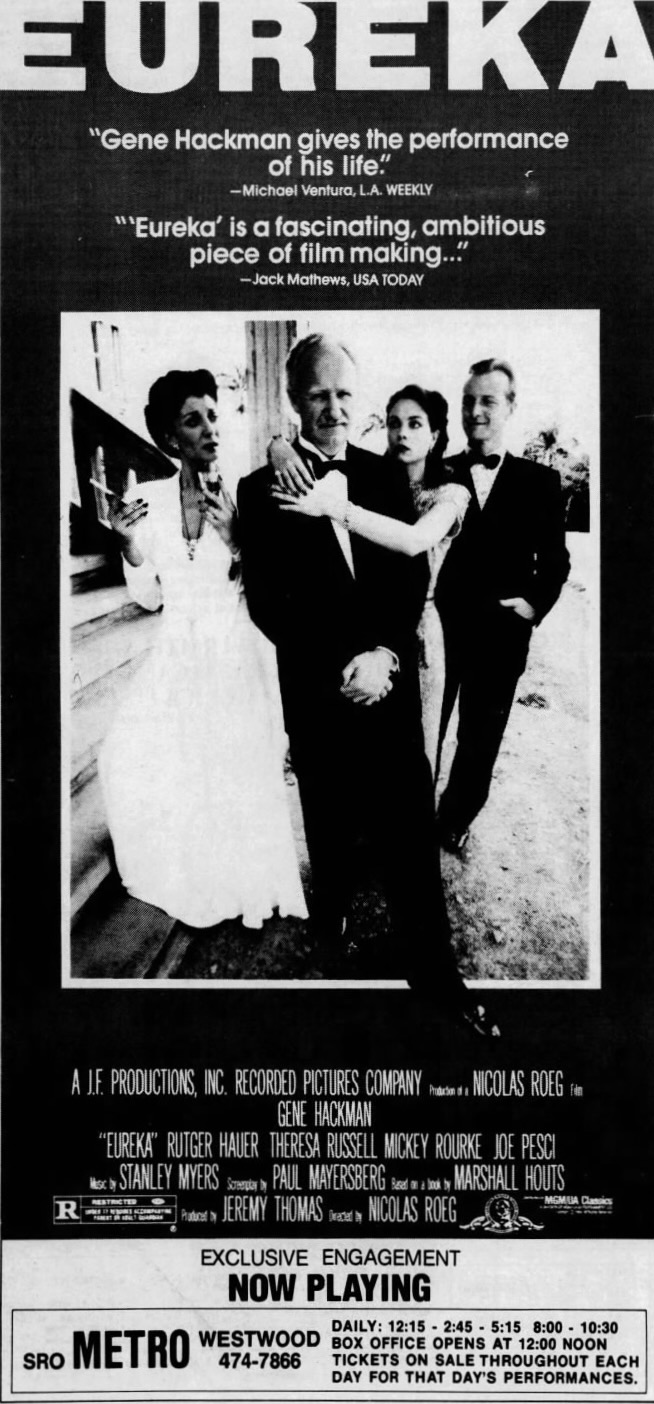
Newspaper advertisement in LA Weekly, October 1984

Producer Jeremy Thomas stated that the film's distributor, United Artists, threatened to abandon it after executive David Begelman was forced to resign from the studio during principal photography. According to Thomas: "Eureka was a child which was born which the parents didn’t want but we got more than halfway. [The studio] had to complete it. They would have stopped it if they could".

During and after the film's completion, United Artists saw the hiring of four successive studio executives, one of whom, according to biographer Joseph Lanza, "had absolutely no regard for either the film or its distribution possibilities". Unsure of how to market the film, United Artists opted to distribute it through their subsidiary MGM/UA Classics, premiering it in London on 5 May 1983. The film's British theatrical release was short-lived, though it did receive sporadic screenings through 1984, several of which had director Roeg in attendance presenting it. It was later exhibited at the Sydney Film Festival in Australia in June 1984.

In the United States, the film initially received an X rating from the Motion Picture Association of America due to its graphic violence. Commenting on the violence, Roeg said: "I feel bad about violence when I think of films, good as they might be, like Friday the 13th, and people say 'Jolly good film, lot of blood, and people are strangled and stabbed!' I believe in the sanctity of life and I've tried to show these gangsters as only foolish people and criminal, not glorified at all. Sadistic violence offered for gain, or to express machismo, is awful".

Over a year after its British premiere, Eureka was given a limited theatrical release in the United States, mainly screening at arthouse cinemas in major cities. The film opened at the Metro Theatre in Westwood, Los Angeles on 5 October 1984, followed by a Chicago release on 16 November 1984. In early 1985, it had a four-day limited engagement in Portland, Oregon, beginning on 1 February, followed by a Houston release on 27 February 1985, and a one-week engagement in San Francisco starting 3 April 1985. The film was given a limited two-week engagement later that year at New York City's Film Forum, with screenings beginning on 30 August 1985.

=== Home media ===
Eureka was released on VHS in the United States by MGM Home Entertainment in 1985 under their United Artists Classics banner. MGM later issued a DVD edition on 16 September 2003. A limited edition Blu-ray release (under license from MGM) was released by Twilight Time on 10 May 2016. Masters of Cinema also issued a Blu-ray edition in the United Kingdom the same year. MGM Home Entertainment reissued the film on Blu-ray in the United States on 19 December 2023.

== Reception ==
=== Box office ===
Eureka was a box-office bomb and marked a significant commercial failure for Roeg, grossing a total of $123,572 against its $11 million budget.

=== Critical response ===
Eureka received mixed reviews from critics at the time of its release. Lanza notes that many critics tended to express dislike for the film's dramatic dialogue rather than its unconventional editing and "cycloramic" camerawork. Philip French, writing for The Observer, commented, "for me, [it is] Roeg's first disappointing film," but conceded that it "is a film that anyone interested in the cinema will want to see at least once". Roger Ebert praised Russell's performance as "brilliant" and also commended the performance by Hackman. He also praised its visual elements, and described it as "a strange, perverse film about passion and greed, and it leads us through a labyrinthine story to a simple message: Money can’t buy you love." Barbara Shulgasser of the San Francisco Examiner awarded the film three out of four stars, describing it as an "engrossing film" that "often verges on camp, falls into lunacy, stumbles past stupidity, then dusts itself off, takes you by the lapels and orders you to have a good time". Eleanor Ringel of The Atlanta Constitution felt the film was "flawed but fascinating... It's risky, self-indulgent movie-making from a director ready to take risks and willing to be labeled self-indulgent".

Ted Mahar of The Oregonian noted numerous narrative parallels to Citizen Kane (1941) and praised Hackman and Russell's performances, noting in particular that Russell "couldn't give a bad performance if she tried". He also commended the film's enigmatic and "esoteric" visuals. Sheila Benson of the Los Angeles Times similarly heralded Hackman's performance as well as Russell's, deeming it her "most feral," and described the imagery as "extraordinary... The story is dressed up with portents and symbols". Fred Haeseker of the Calgary Herald noted similarities to Citizen Kane, writing that Roeg borrows "heavily (and superficially) from Orson Welles" and described the film's imagery as "a tour-de-force of visual baroque", but ultimately felt that the "visual pyrotechnics are an elaborate cover up for a lack of substance". The New York Daily News's Jan Herman felt similarly, summarizing: "Although [Roeg] desperately tries to endow Eureka with mythic dimensions on the order of Citizen Kane, he succeeds only in bloating the screen with bogus mysticism and gratuitous violence".

Lou Lumenick, writing for The Record, gave the film a middling assessment, writing: "Despite a fine cast, it's worth seeing only as a footnote to the troubled career of Roeg, an outstanding visual stylist whose narratively shaky work ranges from the fascinating Don't Look Now to the recent, rather loopy Insignificance". Walter Goodman of The New York Times found the film's screenplay inconsistent and felt its visuals overwhelmed the narrative: "Mr. Roeg is a virtuoso of visual pyrotechnics. This time out, however, the director's strivings for tricky effects seem to have left him little attention to spare for developing his characters or drawing passable performances from his actors". This sentiment was echoed by critic David Sterritt, who wrote: "Eureka is vintage Roeg in its sweep, its bravado, and its explosive visual style. It's also a murky stew of half-baked story ideas, overcooked sex, and nasty violence, inhabited by characters who'd be tedious even if they didn't talk, talk, talk through one self-indulgent scene after another". Gene Siskel felt the film's performances marginally redeemed it, and described the screenplay as "a grossly overwrought parable about materialism," adding: "Roeg overloads his film with outlandish imagery to the point that we're scratching our heads more often than we can appreciate the cast".

Michael Ventura of LA Weekly deemed Eureka Roeg's most "ambitious" and "disturbing" work to date, and ranked it his sixth favorite film of 1984 in a year-end list.

=== Accolades ===
Cinematographer Alex Thomson was nominated for Best Cinematography in a Theatrical Feature Film at the 1983 British Society of Cinematographers Awards.

== Legacy ==
While Eureka had a mixed reception at the time of its release, it has gone on to develop a cult following in the intervening years. Roeg biographer Scott Salwolke describes the film as the director's "most audacious work, one in which everything is larger than life, including the themes". Joseph Lanza, another Roeg biographer, deemed the film one of the director's most accessible works, and likened its cinematography to that of a television miniseries. Director John Boorman declared it "the best picture ever made—for an hour". John Izod writes in his book Films of Nicholas Roeg: Myth and Mind (1992) that, "audiences for Eureka seem to be split between people who find it a drama of great intensity and others who find themselves driven to nervous hilarity". Assessing its reception at the time of its release, Dean Goldberg of Film International described the film as "a commercial and artistic disaster".

On the review aggregator website Rotten Tomatoes, 33% of 6 critics' reviews are positive, with an average rating of 5.7/10.

Kim Newman, writing for Empire in 2000, wrote: "One of the last great undiscovered movies, [Eureka] is the sort of picture you could swear you’d dreamed... It’s one of those movies that defies the star rating system: according to individual taste, it veers from 5 stars to 1 star from scene to scene, and even viewing to viewing." Critic Glenn Erickson praised the film in a 2016 retrospective, noting: "Nicolas Roeg’s bizarre blend of high drama, searing sex and over-the-top brutality waited a year, only to be given a tiny American release. It then dropped out of sight. We’re now in a better position to appreciate the show’s great actors—especially Theresa Russell, the boldest and bravest actress of the 1980s".

Film critic and film maker Mark Cousins put Eureka in his top-10 favorite films in the Sight and Sound Greatest Films poll 2012 and has called the film a "masterpiece". Director Danny Boyle listed Eureka as one of his top-five favorite films of all time.

The film's title was used by musician Jim O'Rourke for his 1999 album Eureka.

== Sources ==
- Erickson, Hal (2017). Any Resemblance to Actual Persons: The Real People Behind 400+ Fictional Movie Characters. Jefferson, North Carolina: McFarland & Company. ISBN 978-1-476-62930-8.
- Finler, Joel W. (1992). The Hollywood Story (Second ed.). London, England: Mandarin. ISBN 978-0-749-30637-3.
- Izod, John (1992). Films of Nicholas Roeg: Myth and Mind. New York City, New York: Palgrave Macmillan. ISBN 978-1-349-11468-9.
- Lanza, Joseph (1989). Fragile Geometry: The Films, Philosophy, and Misadventures of Nicolas Roeg. New York City, New York: PAJ Publications. ISBN 978-1-555-54034-0.
- Leach, Jim (2006). "'Everyone's an American Now': Thatcherite Ideology in the Films of Nicolas Roeg". In Friedman, Lester J. (ed.). Fires Were Started: British Cinema and Thatcherism. London, England: Wallflower Press. pp. 195–208. ISBN 978-1-904-76471-7.
- Mayersberg, Paul (2016). Writer Paul Mayersberg on Eureka (Blu-ray documentary). Twilight Time. OCLC 953799542.
- Polack, Peter (2017). Jamaica, the Land of Film. Newcastle upon Tyne, England: Cambridge Scholars Publishing. ISBN 978-1-443-87375-8.
- Salwolke, Scott (1993). Nicolas Roeg, Film by Film. Jefferson, North Carolina: McFarland & Company. ISBN 978-0-899-50881-8.
- Shail, Robert (2007). British Film Directors: A Critical Guide. Carbondale, Illinois: Southern Illinois University Press. ISBN 978-0-809-32833-8.
- Shelley, Peter (2018). Gene Hackman: The Life and Work. Jefferson, North Carolina: McFarland & Company. ISBN 978-1-476-63369-5.
- Tzioumakis, Yannis (2012). Hollywood's Indies: Classics Divisions, Specialty Labels and American Independent Cinema. Edinburgh, Scotland: Edinburgh University Press. ISBN 978-0-748-64959-4.
