= List of Canadian films of 1974 =

The following Canadian films were released in 1974.

Title	Director	Cast	Genre	Notes
125 Rooms of Comfort	Patrick Loubert	Tim Henry, Robert A. Silverman, Jackie Burroughs	Drama	
Alien Thunder	Claude Fournier	Donald Sutherland, Gordon Tootoosis, Chief Dan George, Kevin McCarthy, Jean Duceppe	Drama	
Along These Lines	Peter Pearson		Documentary	
The Apple, the Stem and the Seeds (La pomme, la queue et les pépins)	Claude Fournier	Donald Lautrec	Comedy	
The Apprenticeship of Duddy Kravitz	Ted Kotcheff	Richard Dreyfuss, Micheline Lanctôt, Jack Warden, Randy Quaid, Joseph Wiseman, Denholm Elliott, Joe Silver	Comedy-drama coming-of-age story based on the novel by Mordecai Richler	Academy Award for Writing Adapted Screenplay nominee – (Mordecai Richler & Lionel Chetwynd)
Bar Salon	André Forcier	Guy L'Écuyer, Madeleine Chartrand	Drama	
Bingo	Jean-Claude Lord	Claude Michaud, Alexandra Stewart, Gilles Pelletier	Political drama	
Black Christmas	Bob Clark	Olivia Hussey, Keir Dullea, Margot Kidder	Horror	
Butley	Harold Pinter	Alan Bates, Jessica Tandy, Richard O'Callaghan	Drama	UK-US-Canada coproduction
By the Blood of Others (Par le sang des autres)	Marc Simenon	Bernard Blier, Denise Filiatrault, Yves Beneyton, Daniel Pilon, Mylène Demongeot	Drama	Canada-France co-production
Canadian Pacific	David Rimmer		Structural film	
Child Under a Leaf	George Bloomfield	Dyan Cannon, Donald Pilon, Joseph Campanella, Al Waxman, Micheline Lanctôt	Drama	
The Corpse Eaters	Lawrence Zazelenchuk	Michael Hopkins, Ed LeBreton, Terry London	Horror	
Cree Hunters of Mistassini	Boyce Richardson, Tony Ianzelo		Documentary	
Deathdream	Bob Clark	John Marley, Lynn Carlin, Richard Backus	Horror	
Deranged	Alan Ormsby, Jeff Gillen	Roberts Blossom	Horror	
The Happy Prince	Michael Mills		Animated short	
Janis	Seaton Findlay & Howard Alk		Documentary	From producer Budge Crawley, this is most complete film ever made about blues legend Janis Joplin; Canadian Film Award-Theatrical documentary
Malachi's Cove	Henry Herbert	John Barrett, David Bradley, Arthur English	Drama	UK-Canada coproduction
Monkeys in the Attic	Morley Markson	Jackie Burroughs, Victor Garber, Jess Walton, Louis Del Grande, Jim Henshaw	Drama	
Montreal Main	Frank Vitale	Frank Vitale, Allan Moyle, Stephen Lack	Drama	
Mousey	Daniel Petrie	Kirk Douglas, Jean Seberg, John Vernon	Thriller	
Once Upon a Time in the East (Il était une fois dans l'est)	André Brassard	Denise Filiatrault, Michelle Rossignol, Frédérique Collin		Drama
Only God Knows	Peter Pearson	Gordon Pinsent, John Beck, Paul Hecht, Tisa Farrow, Toby Tarnow	Drama	
Orders (Les Ordres)	Michel Brault	Hélène Loiselle, Jean Lapointe, Guy Provost	Docudrama	Michel Brault shared a Cannes Film Festival Award for Best Director in 1975.
The Owl Who Married a Goose: An Eskimo Legend	Caroline Leaf		NFB animated short	Academy Award nominee; Canadian Film Award – Animated Short, Non-Feature Overall Sound
Le Plumard en folie	Jacques Lemoine	Alice Sapritch, Michel Galabru	Sex comedy	
A Quiet Day in Belfast	Milad Bassada	Barry Foster, Margot Kidder, Sean McCain	Drama	Canadian Film Award: Actress (Kidder)
Satellites of the Sun	Sidney Goldsmith		NFB documentary	
Seizure	Oliver Stone	Jonathan Frid, Martine Beswick, Hervé Villechaize	Drama	Oliver Stone’s (Platoon) first feature
Sunday in the Country	John Trent	Ernest Borgnine, Michael J. Pollard, Hollis McLaren, Cec Linder, Al Waxman	Drama	
Sweet Movie	Dusan Makavejev	Carole Laure, Pierre Clementi, Anna Prucnal	Political/Experimental feature	France-Canada-West German co-production
There's Nothing Wrong with Being Good to Yourself (Y'a pas d'mal à se faire du bien)	Claude Mulot	Jean Lefebvre, Françoise Lemieux, Michel Galabru, Darry Cowl	Comedy	Canadian-French coproduction
To Kill the King	George McCowan	Patrick O'Neal, Susan Tyrrell, Barry Morse, Lance Henriksen, Cec Linder	Political thriller	
Waiting for Fidel	Michael Rubbo		NFB documentary	Its informal, director-as-star style influenced the films of Nick Broomfield and Michael Moore
The White Dawn	Philip Kaufman	Warren Oates, Timothy Bottoms, Louis Gossett Jr.	Drama	
Why Rock the Boat?	John Howe	Stuart Gillard, Tiiu Leek, Henry Beckman, Patricia Gage	Drama	Canadian Film Award – Adapted Screenplay, Actor (Gillard), Supporting Actor (Beckman)
Wolfpen Principle	Jack Darcus	Janet Wright	Drama	

== See also ==
- 1974 in Canada
- 1974 in Canadian television
