= 1974 in Canada =

- Decades: 1950s; 1960s; 1970s; 1980s; 1990s
- See also: History of Canada; Timeline of Canadian history; List of years in Canada

Events from the year 1974 in Canada.

== Incumbents ==
=== Crown ===
- Monarch – Elizabeth II

=== Federal government ===
- Governor General – Roland Michener (until January 14), then Jules Léger
- Prime Minister – Pierre Trudeau
- Chief Justice – Gérald Fauteux (until January 7), then Bora Laskin
- Parliament – 29th (until 9 May) then 30th (from 30 September)

=== Provincial governments ===
==== Lieutenant governors ====
- Lieutenant Governor of Alberta – Grant MacEwan (until July 2) then Ralph Steinhauer
- Lieutenant Governor of British Columbia – Walter Stewart Owen
- Lieutenant Governor of Manitoba – William John McKeag
- Lieutenant Governor of New Brunswick – Hédard Robichaud
- Lieutenant Governor of Newfoundland – Ewart John Arlington Harnum (until July 2) then Gordon Arnaud Winter
- Lieutenant Governor of Nova Scotia – Clarence Gosse
- Lieutenant Governor of Ontario – William Ross Macdonald (until April 10) then Pauline Mills McGibbon
- Lieutenant Governor of Prince Edward Island – John George MacKay (until October 21) then Gordon Lockhart Bennett (from October 24)
- Lieutenant Governor of Quebec – Hugues Lapointe
- Lieutenant Governor of Saskatchewan – Stephen Worobetz

==== Premiers ====
- Premier of Alberta – Peter Lougheed
- Premier of British Columbia – Dave Barrett
- Premier of Manitoba – Edward Schreyer
- Premier of New Brunswick – Richard Hatfield
- Premier of Newfoundland – Frank Moores
- Premier of Nova Scotia – Gerald Regan
- Premier of Ontario – Bill Davis
- Premier of Prince Edward Island – Alexander B. Campbell
- Premier of Quebec – Robert Bourassa
- Premier of Saskatchewan – Allan Blakeney

=== Territorial governments ===
==== Commissioners ====
- Commissioner of Yukon – James Smith
- Commissioner of Northwest Territories – Stuart Milton Hodgson

== Events ==
- January 1
  - Maurice Nadon is appointed as the 16th commissioner of the Royal Canadian Mounted Police (RCMP), becoming the first French Canadian to hold the post.
  - The Canadian Stock Exchange merges with the Montreal Stock Exchange, with the merged entity operating under the latter name.
  - Woodsworth College at the University of Toronto is founded, formally integrating part-time degree students into the University.
- January 6 – Global Television becomes Canada's third English-language television network when it begins broadcasting in southern Ontario.
- January 7 – Bora Laskin is sworn in as the 14th chief justice of Canada to replace the retiring Gérald Fauteux. In appointing Laskin, Prime Minister Trudeau breaks with tradition by passing over the more senior justice, Ronald Martland.
- January 14 – Jules Léger is sworn in as the 21st governor general of Canada, succeeding the retiring Roland Michener.
- January 15 – The Knight Street Bridge opens, joining Vancouver and Richmond, British Columbia.
- January 17 – Pauline McGibbon of Ontario becomes the first female lieutenant governor of a province.
- March 13 – A treaty between Canada and Denmark is ratified, establishing the maritime border between Ellesmere Island (Canada) and Greenland (Denmark). Measuring approximately 1,449.4 nautical miles (2,684.3 km; 1,667.9 mi), it is the longest negotiated international continental shelf boundary. However, the boundary line has a gap around Hans Island, with both nations claiming sovereignty.
- April 3 – A tornado strikes Windsor, Ontario, killing 9 people. The tornado was part of the 1974 Super Outbreak.
- May 23 – The RCMP accepts applications from women for regular police duties for the first time. The first 32 women formed Troop 17, were sworn in on September 16, 1974, and graduated on March 3, 1975. Beverly Busson, a member of Troop 17, became the first female RCMP commissioner on December 16, 2006.
- June 20 - Canadian Pacific "Royal Hudson" 2860 hauls her first public excursion train from North Vancouver to Squamish since being restored by the British Columbia government as a tourist attraction.
- June 29 – Soviet ballet dancer Mikhail Baryshnikov defects in Toronto.
- July 2 – Ralph Steinhauer becomes the first Aboriginal person to be a lieutenant governor when he is appointed lieutenant governor of Alberta.
- July 3 – Canada first demands that its territorial waters be extended to 200 nautical miles (370 km; 230 mi).
- Vote of no-confidence in parliament forces election.
- July 8 – Federal election: Pierre Trudeau's Liberals win a majority.
- July 31 – Bill 22 is passed making French the official language of government and business in Quebec.
- August 1 – The Elections Act is passed, limiting campaign contributions.
- August 9 – Nine Canadians are killed when Buffalo 461 is shot down during a peacekeeping mission in Syria.
- September 1 - CFVO-TV commences Broadcasting but later gains a regional scandal.
- November 29 – An aircraft is hijacked over Saskatchewan. It is recovered in Saskatoon.

=== Full date unknown ===
- Dorothea Crittenden of Ontario becomes Canada's first female deputy minister, Ministry of Community & Social Services.
- Paul Joseph Martin made president of Canada Steamship Lines.
- The Waffle disbands.
- The report of the Le Dain Commission argues marijuana should be decriminalized.
- Robert Cliche chairs a Royal Commission investigating corruption in Quebec's construction industry. Brian Mulroney, later to become prime minister, first comes to national attention as a panelist on the commission.

== Arts and literature ==
=== New works ===
- bill bissett – Living with the vishyun
- Irving Layton – The Pole-Vaulter
- Margaret Atwood – You Are Happy
- Alice Munro – Something I've Been Meaning to Tell You
- Margaret Laurence – The Diviners

=== Awards ===
- See 1974 Governor General's Awards for a complete list of winners and finalists for those awards.
- Stephen Leacock Award: Donald Jack, That's Me in the Middle
- Vicky Metcalf Award: Jean Little

== Sport ==
- March 16 – The Waterloo Warriors win their first University Cup by defeating the Sir George Williams Georgians, 6 to 5. The final game was played at Maple Leaf Gardens in Toronto.
- May 12 – The Regina Pats win their fourth Memorial Cup by defeating the Quebec Remparts, 7 to 4. The final game is played at the Stampede Corral in Calgary.
- May 19 – Montreal's Bernie Parent of the Philadelphia Flyers is awarded the Conn Smythe Trophy.
- September 22 – Brazilian Emerson Fittipaldi wins the Canadian Grand Prix at Mosport Park in Bowmanville, Ontario.
- November 21 – The Western Ontario Mustangs win their second Vanier Cup by defeating the Toronto Varsity Blues by a score of 19–15.
- November 24 – The Montreal Alouettes win their third Grey Cup by defeating the Edmonton Eskimos, 20 to 7. The 62nd Grey Cup was played at Empire Stadium in Vancouver. Montreal's Don Sweet won the game's Most Valuable Player award and Edmonton's Don Barker won the game's Most Valuable Canadian award.

== Births ==
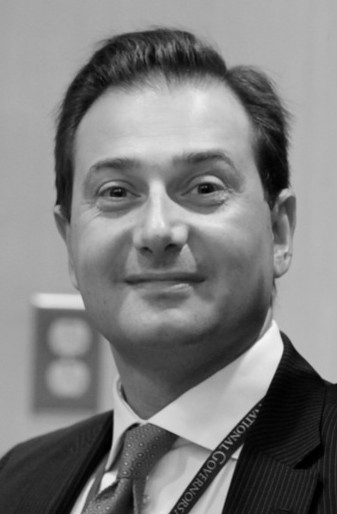
Robert Ghiz

=== January to March ===
- January 14 – Hugues Legault, swimmer
- January 19 – Diane Cummins, middle-distance runner
- January 21 – Robert Ghiz, politician and 31st Premier of Prince Edward Island
- January 23 – Joel Bouchard, ice hockey player
- January 24 – Kristy Sargeant, pair skater
- January 25 – Robert Budreau, director, producer, and screenwriter
- January 29 – Kris Burley, artistic gymnast
- January 31 – Anna Silk, actress
- February 7 – Steve Nash, basketball player
- February 21 – Mary Fuzesi, rhythmic gymnast
- February 22 – David Pelletier, pair skater
- March 14 – Grace Park, actress
- March 20 – Kevin Sullivan, runner and coach

=== April to June ===
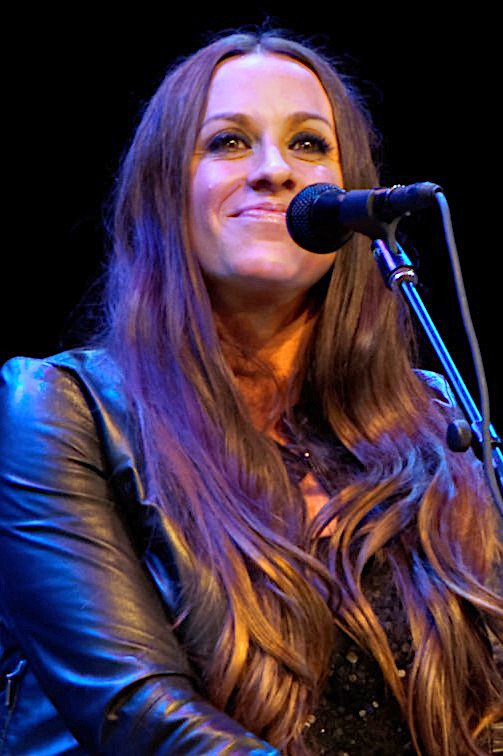
Alanis Morissette

- April 11 – Tricia Helfer, model and actress
- April 26 – Jacinthe Pineau, swimmer
- May 9 – Stéphane Yelle, Canadian ice hockey player
- May 10 – Jon Beare, rower and Olympic bronze medalist
- May 16 – Yannick Keith Lizé, water polo player and scientist
- May 18 – Chantal Kreviazuk, singer-songwriter
- May 18 – Carolyn Russell, squash player
- June 1 – Alanis Morissette, singer-songwriter, record producer and actress
- June 6 – Anson Carter, ice hockey player
- June 9 – Jackie Lance, softball player

=== July to September ===
- July 4 – Kevin Hanchard, actor
- July 6 – Steve Sullivan, ice hockey player
- July 7
  - Patrick Lalime, ice hockey player
  - Jennifer Jones, curler
- July 13 – Deborah Cox, singer-songwriter and actress
- July 26 – Daniel Negreanu poker player
- August 9 – Mara Jones, rower
- August 15 – Natasha Henstridge, actress and model
- September 6 – Sarah Strange actress and voice actress
- September 8 – Becky Price, field hockey player
- September 18 – Nicole Haynes, heptathlete
- September 28 – Alison Parrott, murder victim (d. 1986)

=== October to December ===
- October 6 – Madonna Gimotea, rhythmic gymnast
- October 10 – Chris Pronger, ice hockey player
- October 11 – Jason Arnott, ice hockey player
- October 16 – Paul Kariya, ice hockey player
- October 22 – Paul Duerden, volleyball player
- November 4 – Amy MacFarlane, field hockey player
- November 10 – Michael Greenspan, filmmaker and writer
- November 15 – Chad Kroeger singer
- November 21 – Casey Patton, boxer
- November 22 – David Pelletier, pair skater
- November 25
  - David Cadieux, boxer
  - Kenneth Mitchell, actor (d. 2024)
- December 7 – Nicole Appleton, singer

== Deaths ==
- February 21 – Tim Horton, ice hockey player and businessman (b. 1930)
- February 28 – Harold Sherk, Mennonite minister and peace activist (b. 1903)
- April 2 – Douglass Dumbrille, actor (b. 1889)
- April 5 – A. Y. Jackson, painter, one of the Group of Seven (b. 1882)
- April 8 – James Charles McGuigan, Cardinal (b. 1894)
- June 21 – Merton Yarwood Williams, geologist and academic (b. 1883)
- August 25 – Major James Coldwell, politician (b. 1888)
- December 11 – Benjamin Brown, architect (b. 1890)

== See also ==
- 1974 in Canadian television
- List of Canadian films of 1974
