= 1972 in Canada =

- Decades: 1950s; 1960s; 1970s; 1980s; 1990s
- See also: History of Canada; Timeline of Canadian history; List of years in Canada

Events from the year 1972 in Canada.

== Incumbents ==
=== Crown ===
- Monarch – Elizabeth II

=== Federal government ===
- Governor General – Roland Michener
- Prime Minister – Pierre Trudeau
- Chief Justice – Gérald Fauteux (Quebec)
- Parliament – 28th (until 1 September)

=== Provincial governments ===
==== Lieutenant governors ====
- Lieutenant Governor of Alberta – Grant MacEwan
- Lieutenant Governor of British Columbia – John Robert Nicholson
- Lieutenant Governor of Manitoba – William John McKeag
- Lieutenant Governor of New Brunswick – Hédard Robichaud
- Lieutenant Governor of Newfoundland – Ewart John Arlington Harnum
- Lieutenant Governor of Nova Scotia – Victor de Bedia Oland
- Lieutenant Governor of Ontario – William Ross Macdonald
- Lieutenant Governor of Prince Edward Island – John George MacKay
- Lieutenant Governor of Quebec – Hugues Lapointe
- Lieutenant Governor of Saskatchewan – Stephen Worobetz

==== Premiers ====
- Premier of Alberta – Peter Lougheed
- Premier of British Columbia – W.A.C. Bennett (until September 15) then Dave Barrett
- Premier of Manitoba – Edward Schreyer
- Premier of New Brunswick – Richard Hatfield
- Premier of Newfoundland – Joey Smallwood (until January 18) then Frank Moores
- Premier of Nova Scotia – Gerald Regan
- Premier of Ontario – Bill Davis
- Premier of Prince Edward Island – Alexander B. Campbell
- Premier of Quebec – Robert Bourassa
- Premier of Saskatchewan – Allan Blakeney

=== Territorial governments ===
==== Commissioners ====
- Commissioner of Yukon – James Smith
- Commissioner of Northwest Territories – Stuart Milton Hodgson

== Events ==
=== January to June ===
- January 1 - Winnipeg is merged into a megacity
- January 1 - Canada's ban on cigarette advertisements on film, radio, and television goes into effect
- January 1 - Canada's capital gains tax comes into effect
- January 18 - Frank Moores becomes premier of Newfoundland, replacing Joey Smallwood, who had governed for 23 years
- February 1 - The Atlantic Pilotage Authority is established
- February 25 - The Pickering Nuclear Power Plant opens
- April 15 - Canada and the United States sign the Great Lakes Water Quality Agreement
- May 31 - The "member" level of the Order of Canada is created
- June 16 - The Churchill Falls hydro-electric facility opens

=== July to December ===
- July 14 - Donald MacDonald of the Canadian Labour Congress becomes the first non-European head of the International Confederation of Free Trade Unions
- July 21 - Global Television Network network licence approved by the CRTC
- August 30 - Frank Arthur Calder becomes the first Native Cabinet minister in Canadian history when he is appointed to the Cabinet of British Columbia
- September 1 - An arson attack on the Blue Bird Café in Montreal kills 37 and leads to nationwide changes to fire codes.
- September 4 – Armed robbers steal 18 paintings, including a Rembrandt, along with 38 pieces of jewellery, from the Montreal Museum of Fine Arts, valued at $2 million at the time in what is not only Canada's largest art theft but its largest theft of private property ever. Except for one returned in an attempt to negotiate a ransom, none of the paintings have been recovered nor have the thieves ever been identified publicly.
- September 12 - Heritage Canada is established
- September 15 - David Barrett becomes premier of British Columbia, replacing W.A.C. Bennett, who had governed for 20 years
- September 27 - The sale of fire crackers is banned in Canada
- September 28 - CITY-TV begins broadcasting in Toronto
- October 30 - Federal election: Pierre Trudeau's Liberals win a minority
- November 9 - Anik I, the world's first non-military communications satellite is launched.
- December - The government's Parliamentary Flag Program begins
- December 14 - Muriel McQueen Fergusson becomes the first female Speaker of the Senate of Canada.

=== Full date unknown ===
- Government pensions are indexed to cost of living
- The Art Bank is established
- The Government of Ontario renames all departments to ministries.

== Arts and literature ==
=== New works ===
- Robertson Davies: The Manticore
- Margaret Atwood: Survival: A Thematic Guide to Canadian Literature
- Mordecai Richler: Shovelling Trouble
- John Newlove: Lies
- Milton Acorn: More Poems for People
- Donald Jack: Exit Muttering
- Leona Gom: Kindling
- Joy Fielding: The Best of Friends
- Farley Mowat: A Whale for the Killing
- Marshall McLuhan: Culture Is Our Business

=== Awards ===
- See 1972 Governor General's Awards for a complete list of winners and finalists for those awards.
- Stephen Leacock Award: Max Braithwaite, The Night They Stole the Mounties' Car
- Vicky Metcalf Award: William Toye

== Sport ==
- March 18 – Toronto Varsity Blues win their sixth (and fourth consecutive) University Cup by defeating the Saint Mary's Huskies 5 to 0. The final game was played at the Palais des Sports in Sherbrooke, Quebec
- May 11 – Parry Sound's Bobby Orr is awarded his second Conn Smythe Trophy
- May 14 – Quebec Major Junior Hockey League's Cornwall Royals win the Memorial Cup by defeating the Ontario Hockey Association's Peterborough Petes 2 to 1. The final game was played at the Ottawa Civic Centre.
- September 28 – Canada defeats the Soviet Union in the Summit Series 4 games to 3. The deciding Game 8 was played at Luzhniki Palace of Sports in Moscow
- October 11 – The World Hockey Association is established with four Canadian teams (Ottawa Nationals, Quebec Nordiques, Winnipeg Jets and Alberta Oilers)
- November 25 – Alberta Golden Bears win their second Vanier Cup by defeating the Waterloo Lutheran Golden Hawks 20–7 in the 8th Vanier Cup played at Varsity Stadium in Toronto
- December 3 – Hamilton Tiger-Cats win their sixth Grey Cup by defeating the Saskatchewan Roughriders 13–10 in the 60th Grey Cup played at Ivor Wynne Stadium in Hamilton

== Births ==
=== January to June ===
- January 1
  - Jennifer Hale, actress and singer
  - Barron Miles, defensive back for the BC Lions in the CFL
- January 3 - Drake Berehowsky, ice hockey player and coach
- January 4 – Brad Zavisha, ice hockey player
- January 7 - Susan Cushman, rhythmic gymnast
- January 10 - Jonathan Ohayon, archer
- January 16 – Dameon Clarke, actor and voice actor
- January 25 - Katrina Von Sass, volleyball player
- January 29 - Shaun Majumder, comedian and actor
- January 30 - Chris Simon, ice hockey player
- February 2 - Naheed Nenshi, politician, Mayor of Calgary
- February 3 - Michael Kovrig, diplomat and hostage victim
- February 7 - Jamie Shannon, actor and director
- February 12 - Owen Nolan, ice hockey player
- March 13 - Sherri Field, field hockey player
- March 17 - Melissa Auf der Maur, bassist and photographer
- March 22 - Elvis Stojko, figure skater, Olympic silver medalist and World Champion
- April 1 - Rob Anders, politician
- April 2 - Graham Hood, middle-distance runner
- April 4 - Lisa Ray, model and actress0
- April 9 - Karen Clark, synchronized swimmer
- April 15 - Arturo Gatti, boxer, (died 2009 in Canada|2009)
- April 17 - Terran Sandwith, ice hockey player
- April 21 - Stefan Brogren, actor and director
- April 24 - Nicolas Gill, judoka and Olympic silver medalist
- May 5 - Brad Bombardir, ice hockey player
- May 5 - Devin Townsend, vocalist, guitarist and record producer
- May 6 - Martin Brodeur, ice hockey player
- May 7 - Ray Whitney, ice hockey player
- June 6 - Erin Woodley, synchronised swimmer
- June 15 - Krista Thompson, field hockey player
- June 17 - Steven Fletcher, politician and Minister
- June 26 - Garou, singer
- June 30 - Molly Parker, actress

=== July to December ===
- July 4 - Mike Knuble, ice hockey player
- July 5 - Robert Esmie, Olympic athlete
- August 1
  - Marc Costanzo, musician
  - Tanya Reid, actress
- August 2 – Kelly Richardson, Canadian contemporary artist
- August 23 – Anthony Calvillo, Canadian Football League quarterback
- August 27 - Mike Smith, actor
- August 29 - Amanda Marshall, pop-rock singer
- September 4 - Daniel Nestor, Serbian born tennis player
- September 12 - Lori Strong, artistic gymnast
- September 20 - Sergio Di Zio, actor
- September 21 - Erin Fitzgerald, voice actress
- September 27 - Clara Hughes, cyclist, speed skater and Olympic medalist
- October 5 - Aaron Guiel, baseball player
- October 11 - Brigitte Soucy, volleyball player
- October 17 - Cameron Baerg, rower and Olympic silver medalist
- November 1 - Glen Murray, ice hockey player
- November 10 - Trevor Devall, voice actor and podcaster
- November 11 - Adam Beach, actor
- November 22 - Gabe Khouth, actor and voice actor (died 2019)
- November 26 - Chris Osgood, ice hockey player
- December 11 - Daniel Alfresson, Swedish ice hockey player
- December 19 - Charles Lefrançois, high jumper
- December 23 - Christian Potenza, actor and voice actor

== Deaths ==
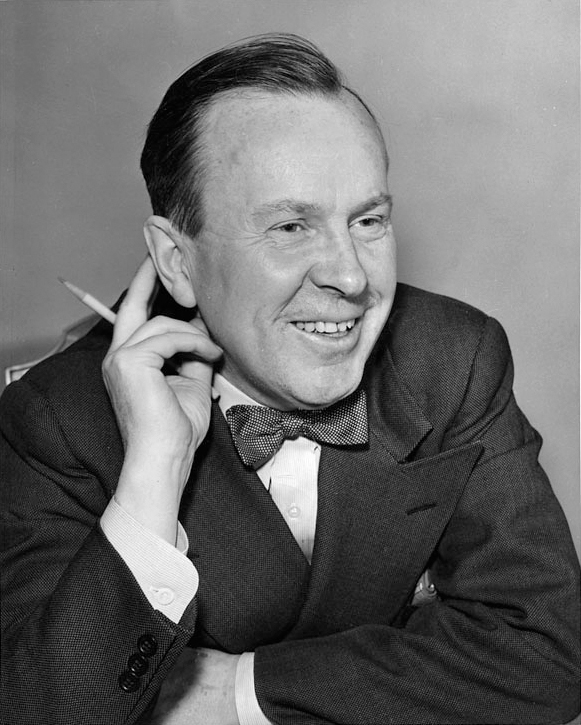
Lester Bowles Pearson in 1944

- January 2 - James White, World War I flying ace (b.1893)
- January 6 - Samuel McLaughlin, businessman and philanthropist (b.1871)
- February 7 - William Henry Fenton, Ontario MLA (b. 1883)
- April 7
  - Al Boliska, radio and television broadcaster (b. 1932)
  - Woodrow Stanley Lloyd, politician and 8th Premier of Saskatchewan (b.1913)
- May 28 - Edward VIII, Duke of Windsor, former King of Canada (b.1894)
- August 20 - A. M. Klein, poet, journalist, novelist, short story writer and lawyer (b.1909)
- October 31 - Bill Durnan, ice hockey player (b.1916)
- December 27 - Lester B. Pearson, politician, 14th Prime Minister of Canada, diplomat and 1957 Nobel Peace Prize recipient (b.1897)

== See also ==
- 1972 in Canadian television
- List of Canadian films of 1972
