= List of Canadian films of 1972 =

This is a list of Canadian films which were released in 1972:

Title	Director	Cast	Genre	Notes
The Apparition (L'Apparition)	Roger Cardinal	René Angélil	Comedy	
Balablok	Břetislav Pojar		Animated short	
Cry of the Wild	Bill Mason		NFB documentary	
Dirty Money (La Maudite galette)	Denys Arcand	Luce Guilbeault, Marcel Sabourin, René Garon, Gabriel Arcand	Drama	Denys Arcand's first dramatic feature
The Doves (Les Colombes)	Jean-Claude Lord	Jean Besré, Lise Thouin, Jean Duceppe	Drama	
Dream Life (La Vie rêvée)	Mireille Dansereau	Liliane Lemaître-Auger, Véronique Le Flaguais	Drama	The first Quebec feature directed by a woman; Canadian Film Awards – Editing, Wendy Mitchener Award
A Fan's Notes	Eric Till	Jerry Orbach, Julia Anne Robinson, Burgess Meredith	Comedy drama	
Françoise Durocher, Waitress	André Brassard		Short drama	
Journey	Paul Almond	Geneviève Bujold, John Vernon	Drama	
The Merry Wives of Tobias Rouke	John Board	Henry Beckman, Paul Bradley, Linda Sorenson, Judith Gault	Comedy	
Montreal Blues	Pascal Gélinas	Paule Baillargeon, Jocelyn Bérubé, Raymond Cloutier, Suzanne Garceau, Claude Laroche, Guy Thauvette	Drama	
Quebec: Duplessis and After... (Québec: Duplessis et après...)	Denys Arcand		NFB documentary	
The Rebels (Quelques arpents de neige)	Denis Héroux	Daniel Pilon, Christine Olivier, Jean Duceppe	Historical drama	
The Rowdyman	Peter Carter	Gordon Pinsent, Will Geer, Linda Goranson	Drama	AV Preservation Trust Masterwork
Selling Out	Tadeusz Jaworski		Documentary	
Springhill	Ron Kelly	Paul Bradley, Sean Sullivan, Ed McNamara	Drama	
Street Musique	Ryan Larkin		Animated short	
This Is Stompin' Tom	Edwin Moody	Stompin' Tom Connors	Documentary	
The Time of the Hunt (Le Temps d'une chasse)	Francis Mankiewicz	Guy L'Écuyer, Marcel Sabourin, Pierre Dufresne, Olivier L'Écuyer	Drama	
The True Nature of Bernadette (La Vraie nature de Bernadette)	Gilles Carle	Micheline Lanctôt, Donald Pilon	Drama	AV Preservation Trust Masterwork
Voulez-vous coucher avec God?	Jack Christie, Michael Hirsh		Experimental	
Wedding in White	William Fruet	Carol Kane, Donald Pleasence, Doris Petrie	Drama	Canadian Film Awards – Feature Film, Supporting Actress (Petrie), Art Direction
The Wise Guys (Les Smattes)	Jean-Claude Labrecque	Donald Pilon, Daniel Pilon, Marcel Sabourin	Crime drama	

== See also ==
- 1972 in Canada
- 1972 in Canadian television
