= 1975 in Canada =

- Decades: 1950s; 1960s; 1970s; 1980s; 1990s
- See also: History of Canada; Timeline of Canadian history; List of years in Canada

Events from the year 1975 in Canada.

== Incumbents ==
=== Crown ===
- Monarch – Elizabeth II

=== Federal government ===
- Governor General – Jules Léger
- Prime Minister – Pierre Trudeau
- Chief Justice – Bora Laskin (Ontario)
- Parliament – 30th

=== Provincial governments ===
==== Lieutenant governors ====
- Lieutenant Governor of Alberta – Ralph Steinhauer
- Lieutenant Governor of British Columbia – Walter Stewart Owen
- Lieutenant Governor of Manitoba – William John McKeag
- Lieutenant Governor of New Brunswick – Hédard Robichaud
- Lieutenant Governor of Newfoundland – Gordon Arnaud Winter
- Lieutenant Governor of Nova Scotia – Clarence Gosse
- Lieutenant Governor of Ontario – Pauline Mills McGibbon
- Lieutenant Governor of Prince Edward Island – Gordon Lockhart Bennett
- Lieutenant Governor of Quebec – Hugues Lapointe
- Lieutenant Governor of Saskatchewan – Stephen Worobetz

==== Premiers ====
- Premier of Alberta – Peter Lougheed
- Premier of British Columbia – Dave Barrett (until December 22) then Bill Bennett
- Premier of Manitoba – Edward Schreyer
- Premier of New Brunswick – Richard Hatfield
- Premier of Newfoundland – Frank Moores
- Premier of Nova Scotia – Gerald Regan
- Premier of Ontario – Bill Davis
- Premier of Prince Edward Island – Alexander B. Campbell
- Premier of Quebec – Robert Bourassa
- Premier of Saskatchewan – Allan Blakeney

=== Territorial governments ===
==== Commissioners ====
- Commissioner of Yukon – James Smith
- Commissioner of Northwest Territories – Stuart Milton Hodgson

== Events ==
=== January to June ===
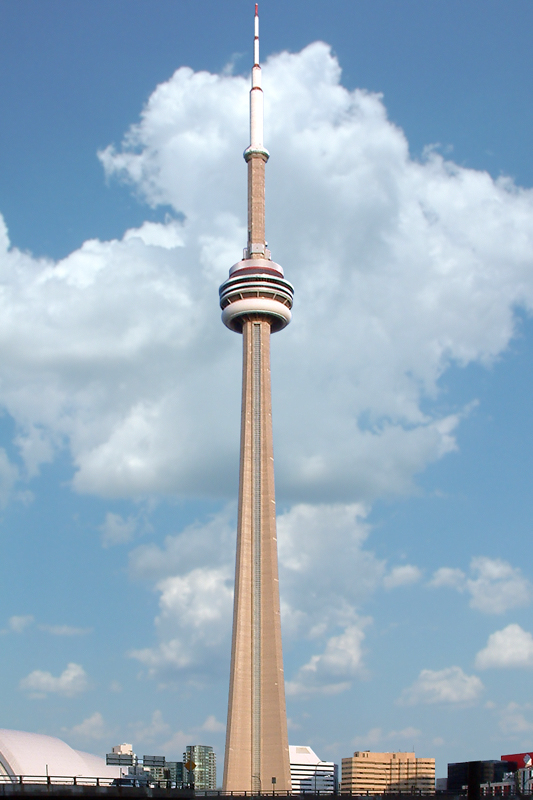
Toronto's CN Tower is completed.

- January 1 - Product labelling using the metric system is introduced
- February 6 - John Damien, a racing steward at Woodbine Racetrack, is fired from his job for being gay, sparking a legal battle that eventually leads to the inclusion of sexual orientation in the Ontario Human Rights Code in 1986.
- February 18 - Sylvia Ostry is appointed Canada's first female Deputy Minister.
- March 4 - Television cameras are allowed to film in Parliament
- March 24 - The beaver becomes an official symbol of Canada
- March 26 - Alberta election: Peter Lougheed's PCs win a second consecutive majority
- April 1 - Environment Canada switches to degrees Celsius
- April 2 - The CN Tower is completed in Toronto
- May 28 - Brampton Centennial Secondary School shooting
- May 30 - The Yukon and the Northwest Territories are given seats in the Senate
- June 11 - Saskatchewan election: Allan Blakeney's NDP win a second consecutive majority
- June 18 - Prime Minister Pierre Trudeau announces the creation of the Foreign Investment Review Agency

=== July to December ===
- July 7 - David Lewis is replaced by Ed Broadbent as leader of the NDP
- July 23 - The Soviet Atlantic fishing fleet is banned from entering Canadian ports due to overfishing
- July 30 - Petro-Canada, the government-owned oil and gas company, is formed.
- September - Ontario schools begin to teach exclusively using the metric system
- September 1 - CKND, Winnipeg's newest television station, begins broadcasting
- September 11 - John Turner resigns from government to protest the implementation of wage and price controls.
- September 18 - Ontario election: Bill Davis's PCs win a minority
- October 2 – A blast at an explosives factory kills six in Beloeil, Quebec, Canada.
- October 4 - Mirabel Airport opens
- October 14 - Federal government introduces wage and price controls to limit inflation
- October 27 - St. Pius X High School shooting: Robert Poulin kills one person and wounds five at St. Pius X High School in Ottawa, before shooting himself.
- November 3 - CBC-FM rebranded as CBC Stereo
- November 10 - The SS Edmund Fitzgerald, based in Sault Ste. Marie sinks
- November 14 - Canada's first community-based campus radio station, CKCU-FM in Ottawa, hits the airwaves
- November 18 - The wearing of seatbelts is made mandatory in Ontario
- November 28 - Canadair nationalized
- December 22 - William R. Bennett sworn in as Premier of British Columbia, replacing David Barrett.

=== Full date unknown ===
- Izzy Asper acquires Winnipeg television station CKND, the beginning of what would become a national media empire.
- Rohinton Mistry emigrates to Canada
- First Canadian Place opens in Toronto
- Colin Thatcher, who would later become famous for his involvement in the murder of his ex-wife, is elected to the Saskatchewan Legislative Assembly.
- In June, 1975 Ovivo, a water and wastewater treatment and purification company, is founded in Quebec as Laperrière & Verreault Inc. (rebranded in 2010).

== Arts and literature ==
=== New books ===
- World of Wonders - Robertson Davies
- A Fine and Private Place - Morley Callaghan
- The Unwavering Eye: Selected Poems, 1969-1975 - Irving Layton
- It's Me Again - Donald Jack
- The Island Means Minago - Milton Acorn
- Jacob Two-Two Meets the Hooded Fang - Mordecai Richler
- Un jardin au bout du monde - Gabrielle Roy
- Jardin des délices - Roch Carrier

=== Awards ===
- See 1975 Governor General's Awards for a complete list of winners and finalists for those awards.
- Stephen Leacock Award: Morley Torgov, A Good Place to Come From
- Vicky Metcalf Award: Lyn Harrington

=== Music ===
- March 1 - Anne Murray and Oscar Peterson each win a Grammy Award.
- Paul Anka - Times of Your Life is released
- Joni Mitchell - The Hissing of Summer Lawns

=== Television ===
- Saturday Night Live, produced by Canadian Lorne Michaels and also featuring Paul Shaffer and Dan Aykroyd, premieres in the United States.

== Sport ==
- March 16 - Alberta Golden Bears won their Third University Cup by defeating the Toronto Varsity Blues 2 games to 1. All the games were played at Northlands Coliseum in Edmonton
- May 11 - Toronto Marlboros won their Seventh (and Final) Memorial Cup by defeating the New Westminster Bruins 7–3. The Final game was played at the Kitchener Memorial Auditorium Complex
- May 12 - Houston Aeros won their Second (and Final) Avco Cup by defeating the Quebec Nordiques 4 games to 0. The deciding game was played at the Colisée de Québec
- May 27 - Montreal, Quebec's Bernie Parent of the Philadelphia Flyers is awarded his Second Conn Smythe Trophy
- November 21 - Ottawa Gee-Gees won their First Vanier Cup by defeating the Calgary Dinos by a score of 14–9 in the 11th Vanier Cup played at Exhibition Stadium in Toronto
- November 23 - Edmonton Eskimos won their Fourth Grey Cup by defeating the Montreal Alouettes 9 to 8 in the 63rd Grey Cup played at McMahon Stadium in Calgary

== Births ==
=== January to March ===
- January 1 - Tammy Homolka, sister and homicide victim of Karla Homolka (d. 1990)
- January 20 - Mark Allan Robinson, political activist
- January 22 - Shean Donovan, ice hockey player
- January 25 - Mia Kirshner, actress
- February 2 - Todd Bertuzzi, ice hockey player
- February 7 - Alexandre Daigle, ice hockey player
- February 15 - Serge Aubin, ice hockey player
- February 16 - Rebecca Shoichet, voice actress and singer
- February 17 - Todd Harvey, ice hockey player and coach
- February 24 - Ashley MacIsaac, fiddler
- February 25 - Hercules Kyvelos, boxer
- March 13 - Ollie Heald, former professional soccer player
- March 17 - Andrew Martin, wrestler (d. 2009)

=== April to June ===
- April 4 - Kevin Weekes, ice hockey player
- April 7 - Owen Von Richter, swimmer
- April 13 - Jasey-Jay Anderson, snowboarder
- April 22 - Greg Moore, racecar driver (d. 1999)
- May 13 - Jamie Allison, ice hockey player
- May 16 - Simon Whitfield, triathlete
- May 20 - Tahmoh Penikett, actor
- May 24 - Marc Gagnon, short track speed skater, triple Olympic gold medallist and multiple World Champion
- May 26 - Craig Hutchison, swimmer
- May 27 - Stella Umeh, artistic gymnast
- May 29 - Jason Allison, ice hockey player
- June 9 - Carolyne Lepage, judoka
- June 16 - Graham Ryding, squash player
- June 18 - Martin St. Louis, ice hockey player
- June 27 - Carlton Chambers, sprint athlete and Olympic gold medallist
- June 28 - Jeff Geddis, film and television actor

=== July to September ===
- July 2 - Éric Dazé, ice hockey player
- July 5 - Patrick Hivon, actor
- July 17 - Troy Amos-Ross, boxer
- July 24 - Marnie Baizley, squash player
- August 13 - Marty Turco, ice hockey player
- August 14 - Dustin Hersee, swimmer
- August 15 - Brendan Morrison, ice hockey player
- September 1 - Scott Speedman, actor
- September 9 - Michael Bublé, singer and actor
- September 22 - Ethan Moreau, hockey player

=== October to December ===
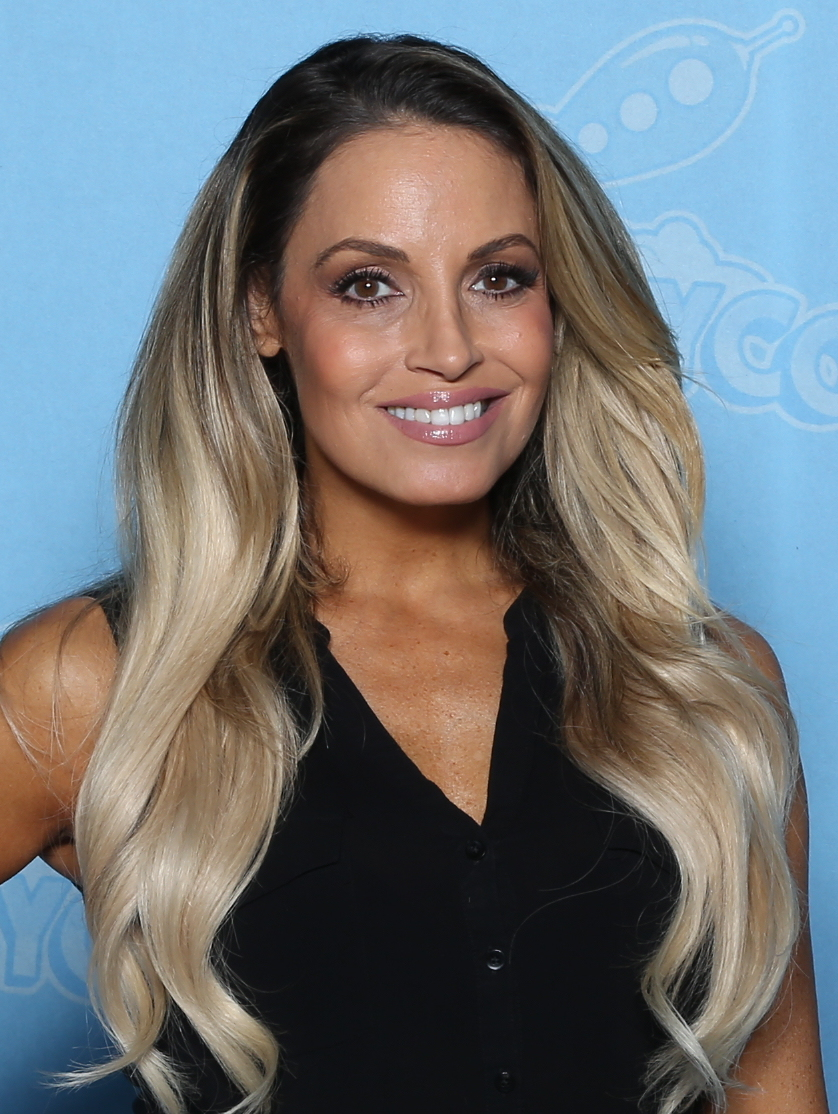
Trish Stratus

- October 2 - Michel Trudeau, student and brother of Justin Trudeau (d. 1998)
- October 21 - Madchild, rapper
- October 23 - Holly McNarland, musician, singer and songwriter
- October 30 - Ian D'sa, guitarist
- October 31 - Director X, music video director
- November 1 - Éric Perrin, ice hockey player
- November 4 - Éric Fichaud, ice hockey player
- November 7 - Mike Mintenko, swimmer
- November 12 - Kiara Bisaro, mountain biker
- November 15 - Yannick Tremblay, ice hockey player
- November 21 - Aaron Solowoniuk, drummer
- December 2 - Brett Lindros, ice hockey player
- December 9 - Damhnait Doyle, pop singer
- December 16 – Ben Kowalewicz, vocalist
- December 17 - Nick Farrell, boxer
- December 18 - Trish Stratus, pro wrestler
- December 20 - Andrew Hoskins, rower

== Deaths ==
=== January to June ===
- January 25 - Charlotte Whitton, feminist, politician and mayor of Ottawa (b. 1896)
- February 15 – Charles Basil Price, soldier and politician (b. 1890)
- March 18 - Alain Grandbois, poet (b. 1900)
- April 11 - Thomas Crerar, politician and minister (b. 1876)
- May 28 - Michael Slobodian, murderer responsible for the Centennial Secondary School shooting (b. 1959)
- June 13 - Merrill Denison, playwright (b. 1893)

=== July to December ===
- August 27 - Jack Dennett, radio and television announcer (b. 1916)
- September - Pat Lowther, poet (b. 1935)
- October 27 - St. Pius X High School shooting
  - Kim Rabot (b. 1958), victim
  - Robert Poulin (b. 1957), murderer
- December 4 - Graham Towers, first Governor of the Bank of Canada (b. 1897)
- December 12 - Roy Kellock, jurist and Justice of the Supreme Court of Canada (b. 1893)

== See also ==
- 1975 in Canadian television
- List of Canadian films of 1975
