= 1975 in Canadian television =

The following is a list of events affecting Canadian television in 1975. Events listed include television show debuts, finales, cancellations, and channel launches.

== Events ==
Date	Event
March 4	The first day television cameras are allowed in the Parliament of Canada.
March 24	Juno Awards of 1975.
September 1	CKND-TV goes on the air as an independent station.
September 16	The first episode of The Fifth Estate airs on CBC Television.
October 12	Canadian Film Awards.

=== Debuts ===
Show	Station	Premiere Date
Science Magazine	CBC Television	January 13
Celebrity Cooks	CBC Television	January 13
Coming Up Rosie	CBC Television	January 13
The Bobby Vinton Show	CTV	September 1
Grand Old Country	CTV	September 8
Sidestreet	CBC Television	September 14
The Fifth Estate	CBC Television	September 16
King of Kensington	CBC Television	September 25
The Watson Report	CBC Television	October 9

=== Ending this year ===
Show	Station	Cancelled
Swiss Family Robinson	CTV	January 2
Adrienne at Large	CBC Television	January 2
Bandwagon with Bob Francis	CBC Television	March 28
Dr. Zonk and the Zunkins	CBC Television	April 14
Arts '73	CBC Television	June 22
Barbara Frum	CBC Television	July
Any Woman Can	CTV	September 9
Funny Farm	CTV	Unknown
Elwood Glover's Luncheon Date	CBC Television	Unknown

== Television shows ==
=== 1950s ===
- Country Canada (1954–2007)
- CBC News Magazine (1952–1981)
- Circle 8 Ranch (1955–1978)
- The Friendly Giant (1958–1985)
- Hockey Night in Canada (1952–present)
- The National (1954–present)
- Front Page Challenge (1957–1995)
- Wayne and Shuster Show (1958–1989)

=== 1960s ===
- CTV National News (1961–present)
- Land and Sea (1964–present)
- Man Alive (1967–2000)
- Mr. Dressup (1967–1996)
- The Nature of Things (1960–present, scientific documentary series)
- The Pig and Whistle (1967–1977)
- Question Period (1967–present, news program)
- Reach for the Top (1961–1985)
- Take 30 (1962–1983)
- The Tommy Hunter Show (1965–1992)
- University of the Air (1966–1983)
- W-FIVE (1966–present, newsmagazine program)

=== 1970s ===
- The Beachcombers (1972–1990)
- Canada AM (1972–present, news program)
- City Lights (1973–1989)
- Definition (1974–1989)
- Excuse My French (1974–1976)
- Headline Hunters (1972–1983)
- House of Pride (1974–1976)
- Howie Meeker's Hockey School (1973–1977)
- Marketplace (1972–present, newsmagazine program)
- Ombudsman (1974–1980)
- Polka Dot Door (1971–1993)
- This Is the Law (1971–1976)
- This Land (1970–1982)
- V.I.P. (1973–1983)

== Television stations ==
=== Debuts ===
Date	Market	Station	Channel	Affiliation	Notes/References
January 19	Montreal, Quebec	CIVM-TV	17	Télé-Québec	
January 19	Quebec City, Quebec	CIVQ-TV	15	Télé-Québec	
August 31	Winnipeg, Manitoba	CKND-TV	9	Independent	
September 1	Calgary, Alberta	CBRT	9	CBC Television (O&O)	

=== Network affiliation changes ===
Date	Market	Station	Channel	Old affiliation	New affiliation	Source
September 1	Calgary, Alberta	CFAC-TV (formerly CHCT-TV)	2	CBC Television	Independent	

=== Closures ===
Date	Market	Station	Channel	Affiliation	Notes/References
September 1	Winnipeg, Manitoba	KCND-TV	12	ABC (secondary)	KCND was licensed to Pembina, North Dakota, along the Canadian border, and serving southern Manitoba, northeast North Dakota and northwest Minnesota. This station was replaced by locally based CKND-TV.

== See also ==
- 1975 in Canada
- List of Canadian films

== Births ==
Date	Name	Notability
November 22	Michael D. Cohen	Actor
