= Lize =

Lize may refer to:

== People ==
=== Given name ===
- Lize Broekx
- Lize Duyvis (1889-1964), Dutch painter
- Lize Feryn (born 1993), Belgian actress, model and author
- Lize Heerman, South African-born singer-songwriter
- Lize Kop (born 1998), Dutch football player
- Lize Marke (born 1936), Belgian singer
- Lize Spit (born 1988), Belgian writer
- Lize-Mari Retief (born 1986), South African swimmer
- Lizé Santana, American singer-songwriter, record producer and actress

=== Surname ===
- Sandra Lizé (born 1977), Canadian water polo player
- Yannick Keith Lizé (born 1974), Canadian water polo player

== Places ==
- Lize Shangwuqu station, Beijing, China
- Lize Lu station, Suzhou, China

== Other ==
- Battle of Lize
