= 1974 in Canadian television =

The following is a list of events affecting Canadian television in 1974. Events listed include television show debuts, finales, cancellations, and channel launches.

== Events ==
Date	Event
January 26	CIII-TV signs on the air, it is known as the Global Television Network. The network has six transmitters in Southern Ontario.
March 3	The National Dream, an 8 part mini-series, begins airing on CBC.
March 25	Juno Awards of 1974.
July 8	Coverage of the 1974 federal election airs live on all the main networks.
December 9	CBC Begins using their famous exploding pizza logo
Unknown	Montreal, Quebec based animation studio CinéGroupe is founded and later launched. The company was best known for making various franchises shown on many networks in the U.S. such as Tripping the Rift (Sci-Fi Channel), Sagwa, the Chinese Siamese Cat (PBS), The Kids from Room 402 (Fox Family) and the direct to video film Heavy Metal 2000, a sequel to the hit animated film Heavy Metal (for Columbia TriStar Home Video).

=== Debuts ===
Show	Station	Premiere Date
Definition	CTV	January 6
Excuse My French	CTV	January 6
House of Pride	CBC Television	January 6
Ombudsman	CBC Television	January 6
The National Dream	CBC Television	March 3
Swiss Family Robinson	CTV	September 12
Funny Farm	CTV	September 12
Dr. Zonk and the Zunkins	CBC Television	September 23
Adrienne at Large	CTV	September 26
Any Woman Can	CTV	October 7
Barbara Frum	CBC Television	October 7
Performance	CBC Television	December 8

=== Ending this year ===
Show	Station	Cancelled
The National Dream	CBC Television	April 28
Audubon Wildlife Theatre	CBC Television	June
Anything You Can Do	CTV Television Network	September
The Collaborators	CBC Television	December
Drop-In	CBC Television	Unknown
Singalong Jubilee	CBC Television	Unknown
Dr. Simon Locke	CTV Television Network	Unknown
Eye Bet	CTV Television Network	Unknown

== Television shows ==
=== 1950s ===
- Country Canada (1954–2007)
- CBC News Magazine (1952–1981)
- Circle 8 Ranch (1955–1978)
- The Friendly Giant (1958–1985)
- Hockey Night in Canada (1952–present)
- The National (1954–present)
- Front Page Challenge (1957–1995)
- Wayne and Shuster Show (1958–1989)

=== 1960s ===
- CTV National News (1961–present)
- Elwood Glover's Luncheon Date (1963–1975)
- Land and Sea (1964–present)
- Man Alive (1967–2000)
- Mr. Dressup (1967–1996)
- The Nature of Things (1960–present, scientific documentary series)
- The Pig and Whistle (1967–1977)
- Question Period (1967–present, news program)
- Reach for the Top (1961–1985)
- Take 30 (1962–1983)
- The Tommy Hunter Show (1965–1992)
- University of the Air (1966–1983)
- W-FIVE (1966–present, newsmagazine program)

=== 1970s ===
- Arts '73 (1973–1975)
- Bandwagon with Bob Francis (1972–1975)
- The Beachcombers (1972–1990)
- Canada AM (1972–present, news program)
- City Lights (1973–1989)
- Headline Hunters (1972–1983)
- Howie Meeker's Hockey School (1973–1977)
- Marketplace (1972–present, newsmagazine program)
- Polka Dot Door (1971-1993)
- This Is the Law (1971–1976)
- This Land (1970–1982)
- V.I.P. (1973–1983)

== Television stations ==
=== Debuts ===
Date	Market	Station	Channel	Affiliation	Notes/References
January 6	Paris/Toronto, Ontario	CKGN-TV	22	Global	Broadcast over six transmitters to cover most of southern Ontario
September 1	Edmonton, Alberta	CITV-TV	13	Independent	
September 1	Hull, Quebec/Ottawa, Ontario	CFVO-TV	30	TVA	Shut down March 30, 1977.
September 19	Sherbrooke, Quebec	CKSH-TV	9	Radio-Canada	

== See also ==
- 1974 in Canada
- List of Canadian films
