= 1972 in Canadian television =

The following is a list of events affecting Canadian television in 1972. Events listed include television show debuts, finales, cancellations, and channel launches.

== Events ==
Date	Event
January 23	The 13 part miniseries The Whiteoaks of Jalna airs on CBC Television. At the time, the series is the most expensive television production in Canada.
February 1	CFFB-TV goes on the air in Frobisher Bay (now Iqaluit).
February 28	Juno Awards of 1972.
September 2–8; 22–28	The Summit Series airs for 8 games on CBC Television and CTV. The games bring in big ratings.
September 2–8; 22–28	CITY-TV goes on the air. It is known as Citytv.
September 2–8; 22–28	The 1972 Canadian Film Awards.
November 9	Anik A1 satellite launches. This allows CBC to begin broadcasting in the north.

=== Debuts ===
Show	Station	Premiere Date
Eye Bet	CTV	September
Canada AM	CTV	September 11
Headline Hunters	CTV	September 11
George	CTV	September 16
Bandwagon with Bob Francis	CBC Television	September 21
Alan Hamel's Comedy Bag	CBC Television	September 23
The Beachcombers	CBC Television	October 1
Marketplace	CBC Television	October 5

=== Ending this year ===
Show	Station	Cancelled
The Galloping Gourmet	CBC Television	Unknown

== Television shows ==
=== 1950s ===
- Country Canada (1954–2007)
- CBC News Magazine (1952–1981)
- Chez Hélène (1959–1973)
- Circle 8 Ranch (1955–1978)
- The Friendly Giant (1958–1985)
- Hockey Night in Canada (1952–present)
- The National (1954–present)
- Front Page Challenge (1957–1995)
- Wayne and Shuster Show (1958–1989)

=== 1960s ===
- Audubon Wildlife Theatre (1968–1974)
- CTV National News (1961–present)
- Elwood Glover's Luncheon Date (1963–1975)
- Land and Sea (1964–present)
- Man Alive (1967–2000)
- Mr. Dressup (1967–1996)
- The Nature of Things (1960–present, scientific documentary series)
- The Pierre Berton Show (1962–1973)
- The Pig and Whistle (1967–1977)
- Question Period (1967–present, news program)
- Reach for the Top (1961–1985)
- Singalong Jubilee (1961–1974)
- Take 30 (1962–1983)
- Telescope (1963–1973)
- The Tommy Hunter Show (1965–1992)
- University of the Air (1966–1983)
- W-FIVE (1966–present, newsmagazine program)

=== 1970s ===
- Alphabet Soup (1971–1973)
- Anything You Can Do (1971–1974)
- Drop-In (1970–1974)
- Dr. Simon Locke (1971–1974)
- Here Come the Seventies (1970–1973)
- Polka Dot Door (1971-1993)
- This Is the Law (1971–1976)
- This Land (1970–1982)

== TV films ==
- Françoise Durocher, Waitress
- The Selfish Giant
- Springhill

== Networks and services ==
=== Network launches ===
Network	Type	Launch	Notes
Atlantic Television System	Over-the-air and cable and satellite	September 26	The Atlantic Television System (present-day CTV Atlantic), was formed by virtue of CHUM Limited’s purchase of CTV affiliates in the Maritime provinces.

== Television stations ==
=== Debuts ===
Date	Market	Station	Channel	Affiliation	Notes/References
February 1	Frobisher Bay, Northwest Territories (present-day Iqaluit, Nunavut)	CFFB-TV	8	CBC Television (O&O)	
September 26	Sydney, Nova Scotia	CBIT-TV	5	CBC Television (O&O)	
September 28	Toronto, Ontario	CITY-TV	79	Independent	Future Citytv network flagship
October 14	Thunder Bay, Ontario	CHFD-TV	4	CTV	

=== Network affiliation changes ===
Date	Market	Station	Channel	Old affiliation	New affiliation	Source
September 26	Sydney, Nova Scotia	CJCB-TV	4	CBC Television	CTV via Atlantic Television System	

== Births ==
Date	Name	Notability
July 6	Susan Aceron	Actress (Sailor Moon)

== See also ==
- 1972 in Canada
- List of Canadian films
