= Zazelenchuk =

Surname list

Zazelenchuk is a surname. Notable people with the surname include:

- Jo-Ann Zazelenchuk (born 1958), Canadian politician
- Lawrence Zazelenchuk, Canadian film director, screenwriter, film producer, and prosthetic makeup artist
