= List of Canadian films of 1975 =

This is a list of Canadian films which were released in 1975:

Title	Director	Cast	Genre	Notes
Ahô: The Forest People	François Floquet, Daniel Bertolino		Documentary	
L'Amour blessé	Jean Pierre Lefebvre		Drama	
At 99: A Portrait of Louise Tandy Murch	Deepa Mehta	Louise Tandy Murch	Documentary	
Before the Time Comes (Le Temps de l'avant)	Anne Claire Poirier	Luce Guilbeault, Pierre Gobeil, Paule Baillargeon	Drama	
Bound for Glory (Partis pour la gloire)	Clément Perron	Serge L'Italien, André Melançon	Drama	
Confidences of the Night (L'Amour blessé)	Jean Pierre Lefebvre	Louise Cuerrier	Drama	
Don't Push It (Pousse mais pousse égal)	Denis Héroux	Gilles Latulippe, Celine Lomez, Yves Létourneau	Comedy	
Cold Journey	Martin Defalco	John Yesno, Dan George, Buckley Petawabano	Drama	NFB feature on residential schools
Eliza's Horoscope	Gordon Sheppard	Elizabeth Moorman, Tommy Lee Jones, Lila Kedrova	Drama	
For Better or For Worse (Pour le meilleur et pour le pire)	Claude Jutra	Claude Jutra, Monique Miller	Comedy	
Gina	Denys Arcand	Céline Lomez, Gabriel Arcand, Paule Baillargeon	Drama	
Ilsa, She Wolf of the SS	Don Edmonds	Dyanne Thorne, George Buck Flower	Sexploitation thriller	
It Seemed Like a Good Idea at the Time	John Trent	Anthony Newley, Stefanie Powers, Isaac Hayes, John Candy	Comedy.	John Candy's first film role
Jacques Brel Is Alive and Well and Living in Paris	Denis Héroux	Mort Shuman, Elly Stone, Joe Masiell	Based on the popular stage production	Canada-France co-production
Journey into Fear	Daniel Mann	Sam Waterston, Zero Mostel, Vincent Price, Shelley Winters	Thriller	A remake of the Orson Welles film from 1943 made by a British production company in Vancouver.
Lies My Father Told Me	Ján Kadár	Yossi Yadin, Len Birman, Marilyn Lightstone, Jeffrey Lynas, Ted Allan	Drama based on a short story by Ted Allen	Academy Award nominee for Best Screenplay; Canadian Film Awards – Film of the Year, Adapted Screenplay, Actress (Marilyn Lightstone), Sound; Golden Reel Award; Golden Globes – Best Foreign Film
Lions for Breakfast	William Davidson	Jim Henshaw, Jan Rubeš, Susan Petrie	Children's film	
The Man Who Skied Down Everest	Budge Crawley	Yuichiro Miura	Documentary based on the diary of Yuichiro Miura	
Metamorphosis	Barry Greenwald		Short	Canadian Film Award – Non-Feature Sound Editing; Cannes Film Festival – Palme d'Or for Short Film
The Mob (La Gammick)	Jacques Godbout	Marc Legault, Dorothée Berryman	Crime drama	
Monsieur Pointu	Bernard Longpré, André Leduc		NFB animated short	Academy Award nominee
My Pleasure Is My Business	Al Waxman	Xaviera Hollander, Henry Ramer, Colin Fox	Exploitation	
Normande (La tête de Normande St-Onge)	Gilles Carle	Carole Laure, Raymond Cloutier, Reynald Bouchard	Drama	
The Port of Montreal (Le Port de Montréal)	Gilles Blais		Documentary	
Recommendation for Mercy	Murray Markowitz	Andrew Skidd, Robb Judd, Mike Upmalis		
Shivers	David Cronenberg	Paul Hampton, Joe Silver, Lynn Lowry	Horror	David Cronenberg's first feature
Sudden Fury	Brian Damude	Dominic Hogan, Gay Rowan, Dan Hennessey	Thriller	
The Vultures (Les Vautours)	Jean-Claude Labrecque	Gilbert Sicotte, Monique Mercure, Gabriel Arcand	Drama	
Whistling Smith	Marrin Cannell, Michael Scott	Bernie Smith	Documentary	
White Line Fever	Jonathan Kaplan	Jan-Michael Vincent, Kay Lenz, Slim Pickens, L.Q. Jones	Drama	Shot in Arizona with American actors, produced by John Kemeny and distributed by Columbia Pictures.

== See also ==
- 1975 in Canada
- 1975 in Canadian television
