= The Sceptre and the Mace =

- Directed by: John Howe
- Produced by: Nicholas Balla
- Narrated by: John Drainie (English); Gérard Arthur (French)
- Cinematography: Denis Gillson
- Edited by: Nicholas Balla; Brian Keene; Don Wellington (sound)
- Production company: National Film Board of Canada
- Release date: 1957
- Running time: 29:17 minutes
- Country: Canada

The Sceptre and the Mace (Le sceptre et la masse) is a 1957 short documentary film, directed by John Howe for the National Film Board of Canada.

The film uses the royal visit by Queen Elizabeth II to Canada in 1957 to explore and explain the role of The Crown in a constitutional monarchy, focusing in particular on the opening of the 23rd Canadian Parliament, which remains to this day the only session of Parliament in Canadian history formally opened by the Queen herself rather than by the Governor General of Canada. It also shows many informal scenes of the Queen and Prince Philip in residence at Rideau Hall.

The Sceptre and the Mace won the Canadian Film Award for Best Theatrical Short Film at the 10th Canadian Film Awards in 1958. In 1970, it was broadcast by CBC Television as an episode of the documentary series History Makers.
