= Existenz =

1999 film by David Cronenberg

eXistenZ
- Theatrical release poster
- Directed by: David Cronenberg
- Written by: David Cronenberg
- Produced by: David Cronenberg; András Hámori; Robert Lantos
- Starring: Jennifer Jason Leigh; Jude Law; Ian Holm; Don McKellar; Callum Keith Rennie; Sarah Polley; Robert A. Silverman; Christopher Eccleston; Willem Dafoe
- Cinematography: Peter Suschitzky
- Edited by: Ronald Sanders
- Music by: Howard Shore
- Production companies: The Movie Network; Natural Nylon; Téléfilm Canada; Serendipity Point Films
- Distributed by: Alliance Atlantis Releasing (Canada); Alliance Atlantis Releasing UK (United Kingdom)
- Release dates: February 16, 1999 (Berlin Film Festival); April 14, 1999 (France); April 23, 1999 (Canada); April 30, 1999 (United Kingdom)
- Running time: 97 minutes
- Countries: Canada; United Kingdom
- Language: English
- Budget: CAD31 million; (USD15 million)
- Box office: $7 million (France/Canada/UK/US)

Existenz (stylized as eXistenZ) is a 1999 science fiction horror film written, produced and directed by David Cronenberg. The film follows Allegra Geller (Jennifer Jason Leigh), a game designer who becomes the target of assassins while playing a virtual reality game of her own creation. An international co-production between Canada, the United Kingdom, and France, it also stars Jude Law, Ian Holm, Don McKellar, Callum Keith Rennie, Sarah Polley, Christopher Eccleston, Willem Dafoe, and Robert A. Silverman.

The film received mostly positive reviews upon release. Cronenberg was awarded the Silver Bear for Outstanding Artistic Contribution at the 49th Berlin International Film Festival.

== Plot ==
In the near future, virtual reality games are played on biotechnological "game pods" that attach to people's "bio-ports", connectors surgically inserted into players' spines. Two game companies, Antenna Research and Cortical Systematics, compete against each other. In addition, a group of fanatics called Realists fight both companies, decrying the "deforming" of reality by virtual reality games.

World-renowned game designer Allegra Geller demonstrates Antenna Research's latest virtual reality game, eXistenZ, to a focus group. The demonstration is disrupted by Noel Dichter, a Realist who shoots Geller with an organic pistol he smuggled past security. As Dichter is gunned down, security guard and publicist Ted Pikul escorts Geller to safety.

Geller discovers that her pod, which contains the only copy of eXistenZ, may have been damaged. Pikul reluctantly agrees to have a bio-port installed in his spine so they can jointly test the game's integrity. Geller takes him to a gas station run by black-marketeer Gas, who deliberately installs a faulty bio-port into Pikul's spine. He reveals his intention to kill Geller for the bounty on her head, but Pikul kills him. The two hide at a former ski lodge used by Geller's mentor Kiri Vinokur, who repairs the damaged pod and gives Pikul a new bio-port.

Testing the game, Geller and Pikul meet D'Arcy Nader, who provides them with new "micro pods," enabling them to enter a deeper layer of virtual reality. There they assume new identities as workers Larry Ashen and Barb Bricken in a game pod factory. Another worker in the factory, Yevgeny Nourish, claims to be their Realist contact. At a Chinese restaurant near the factory, Nourish instructs that they order "the special" for lunch. Pikul eats the unappetizing special, and constructs a pistol from the inedible parts. He impulsively threatens Geller, then shoots the Chinese waiter. When the pair return to the game store, Hugo Carlaw informs them that Nourish is actually a double agent for Cortical Systematics, and the waiter which Pikul murdered was the actual contact.

At the factory, they find a diseased pod. Geller connects it to her bio-port, planning to infect the other pods and sabotage the factory. When Geller quickly becomes ill, Pikul cuts her free from the pod, but she begins to bleed to death. Nourish appears with a flamethrower and blasts the diseased pod, which bursts into deadly spores.

Geller and Pikul awaken back at the ski lodge, where they discover Geller's game pod is also diseased. Geller surmises that Vinokur must have infected Pikul's new bio-port to destroy her game, and she inserts a disinfecting device into Pikul's bio-port. Unexpectedly, Carlaw reappears as a Realist resistance fighter and escorts Geller and Pikul outside to witness the death of eXistenZ. Before Carlaw can kill Geller, Vinokur, who is a double agent for Cortical Systematics, shoots Carlaw in the back and informs Geller that he copied her game data while fixing her pod; she then vengefully kills Vinokur. Pikul then reveals that he himself is a Realist sent to kill her. Geller, having figured out his intentions since he pointed the gun at her in the Chinese restaurant, detonates the disinfecting device in his bio-port, killing him.

Suddenly, Pikul and Geller awaken in a small church, together with all of the other members of the cast, all wearing blue electronic virtual reality devices. It is revealed that all preceding events took place within Nourish's new virtual reality game, PilgrImage's transCendenZ. The test group praise the game, and reflect on their character roles.

Nourish tells his assistant Merle that he feels uneasy, as the heavy anti-game plot elements may have originated from one of the testers' thoughts. Pikul and Geller approach Nourish and accuse him of distorting reality, before fatally shooting him and Merle, and shouting Realist sentiments. The test group do not react. As Pikul and Geller leave, they aim their guns at the person who played the Chinese waiter, who first pleads for his life, then asks if they are still in the game. Pikul and Geller do not answer.

== Cast ==
- Jennifer Jason Leigh as Allegra Geller
- Jude Law as Ted Pikul
- Ian Holm as Kiri Vinokur
- Don McKellar as Yevgeny Nourish
- Callum Keith Rennie as Hugo Carlaw
- Sarah Polley as Merle
- Christopher Eccleston as the Seminar Leader
- Willem Dafoe as Gas
- Robert A. Silverman as D'Arcy Nader
- Oscar Hsu as Chinese Waiter
- Kris Lemche as Noel Dichter
- Vik Sahay as Male Assistant

== Production ==
The film's plot came about after Cronenberg conducted an interview with Salman Rushdie for Shift magazine in 1995. At the time, Rushdie was in hiding due to a fatwa having been put on his life, due to his controversial book The Satanic Verses. Rushdie's dilemma gave Cronenberg an idea of "a Fatwa [sic] against a virtual-reality game designer". Existenz was originally pitched to Metro-Goldwyn-Mayer, but they did not green-light the film due to its complex structure.

This was Cronenberg's first original script since Videodrome.

Cronenberg deliberately avoided using conventional futuristic imagery in the film. He chose not to include computers, television sets or screens, and also excluded mirrors, jewellery, patterned clothing and trainers from the production design and costumes. These choices were meant to subtly disorient the audience rather than create an explicitly futuristic setting.

== Novelizations ==
- Christopher Priest wrote the tie-in novel to accompany the film eXistenZ, the theme of which has much in common with some of Priest's other novels.
- In 1999, a graphic novel credited to David Cronenberg and Sean Scoffield was published.

== Release ==
The film opened April 14, 1999 in France on 232 screens. It opened in Canada and the United States on April 23, 1999.

== Reception ==
=== Box office ===
The film had 211,401 admissions in France in its first five days; a gross of approximately $1.3 million. The film grossed $2.9 million in Canada and the United States and $2.6 million in the United Kingdom. i.e. a total of over $6.8 million in these four countries.

=== Critical reception ===
The film received generally positive reviews, with a 76% approval rating at Rotten Tomatoes based on 76 reviews, with an average rating of 6.7/10. The site's critical consensus reads, "Gooey, slimy, grotesque fun." Metacritic assigned a score of 68 out of 100, based on 29 critics, indicating "generally favorable reviews".

Roger Ebert gave the film three stars out of four in his review of the film, noting its release after fellow science-fiction film The Matrix. He compared the two films, stating that while both have special effects, Cronenberg's film was stranger along with having his best effects involve "gooey, indescribable organic things".

Conversely, James Berardinelli gave the film a two out of four star rating in his review. He cites that the film had a "disjointed feel", and called it a "missed opportunity" that suffered from being released near The Matrix and Open Your Eyes, which he states did similar things that were accomplished better in those films.

== Accolades ==
Berlin International Film Festival

- Won, Silver Bear for outstanding artistic contribution David Cronenberg
- Nominated, Golden Bear: David Cronenberg

Amsterdam Fantastic Film Festival

- Won, Silver Scream: David Cronenberg

Genie Awards

- Won, Best Achievement in Editing: Ronald Sanders
- Nominated, Best Achievement in Art Direction/Production Design: Carol Spier, and Elinor Rose Galbraith
- Nominated, Best Motion Picture: David Cronenberg, Robert Lantos, and Andras Hamori

Golden Reel Awards

- Nominated, Best Sound Editing in a Foreign Feature: David Evans, Wayne Griffin, Mark Gingras, John Laing, Tom Bjelic, and Paul Shikata

Saturn Awards

- Nominated, Best Science Fiction Film (lost to The Matrix)

== See also ==
- The Thirteenth Floor
- The Matrix

== Works cited ==
- Mathijs, Ernest (2008). The Cinema of David Cronenberg: From Baron of Blood to Cultural Hero. Wallflower Press. ISBN 9781905674657.
