= Lizé Santana =

American singer-songwriter (born 1980)

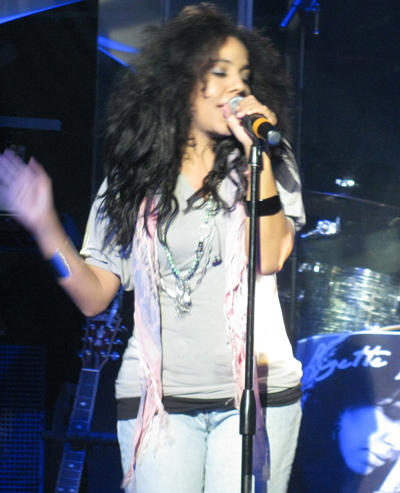
- Lizé Santana performing at her release party 2009

Background information
- Also known as: Lizé
- Born: Lizette Santana; September 20, 1980 (age 46); Boston, Massachusetts, U.S.
- Genres: Folk rock, Latin pop, Rock en Español, Pop rock, World music
- Occupations: Singer-songwriter, record producer, actress
- Instruments: vocals, piano, guitar
- Years active: 2009–present
- Labels: Rocstar, Inc.
- Website: www.lizesantana.com

Lizette Santana (born September 20, 1980), known professionally as Lizé, is an American singer-songwriter, record producer, and actress.

== Biography ==
Lizé Santana was born in Boston, Massachusetts, to parents, natives of the Dominican Republic, who relocated and met in United States during the mid- 1960s. She began classical music piano training at the age of 9. At 16 won her third state award in the National Guild Piano Playing Recitals, a division of the American College of Musicians. A year later she received Honorable Mention in the preliminaries for Star Search and attended Boston's prestigious Berklee College of Music, majoring in Music Business, before moving to New York City, where she performed actively in the rock music scene of Lower East Side, continued writing songs and gained a following. During this time, she also worked at Atlantic Records and attended The School for Film and Television, before finally making her home in Miami, Florida. Once in Miami, Lizé was invited to perform at the 1st Annual Urban Music Festival at the Bayfront Park Amphitheater in front of more than 10,000 music fans. Joined by R.J. Ronquillo on electric guitar, Andres Dalmastro on acoustic guitar, drummer Jody Hill and violinist Hugo Martinez. During her early years in Miami, she also continued working in the business side of the music industry at Sony/ATV Music Publishing and later at an independent record label which was distributed through Universal Music Group. She also hosted singer-songwriter weekly event at the Marlin Hotel, home of the famous South Beach Studios, where top industry pop artists would record. Experiences which awakened her entrepreneurial curiosity and equipped her on creating her own record label later on.

In 2005, Lizé started her own entertainment management company, Rocstar, Inc., along with her sisters. At that time they managed the careers of celebrity make-up artists, video directors, stylists and up and coming artists. In 2006, Rocstar, Inc. coordinated red carpet and press appearance for then Def Jam artist Karina Pasian for the 7th Annual Latin Grammy Awards, Pasian's label was managed by Jay-Z at the time. In 2008, the company became a record label, releasing Lizette Santana's "Aún Sueño en Ti | I Still Dream of You" album in the summer of 2009 and making her the first woman artist in the latin music market to be released under her own independent label. The album debuted under iTunes, Rock Latino "New and Noteworthy". She collaborated with multi-instrumentalist, songwriter and producer Fernando Perdomo (MIKA, Juanes, Jennifer Lopez, Soraya, Jorge Moreno, Paulina Rubio, Andy Pratt). Other musicians who contributed to the album were Derek Cintron (of DC3), RJ Ronquillo (Ricky Martin – MTV Unplugged), and Mexican composer Miguel Luna, who has also written for artists such as Luis Miguel and Ricardo Arjona.

In September 2009, Lizé Santana was invited to perform at the Latin Pride National Awards, which recognizes the most successful representatives of the Latino community in sports, film, music, education and fashion. Past honorees have included Miss Universe Amelia Vega, baseball player Sammy Sosa, Pulitzer Prize winner Author Junot Diaz, to name a few.

The same year Lizé was also invited as a featured singer-songwriter by Chrystal Hartigan to perform at her Singer-songwriter showcase at the Broward Center for the Performing Arts, which Hartigan produces under the new name "Chrystal Hartigan Presents Songwriters Showcase". Previously named, "Songwriters in the Round", which she co-founded with songwriter-producer Desmond Child. Lizé also performed at the "Get back to 1969" benefit concert for the homeless of Miami, alongside artists such as Tommy Torres, Javier Garcia, Elsten Torres, Alih Jey, among others.

In January 2011, the single "Besos" and its music video was released, under her stage name Lizé, which is a shorter version of her real name. Lizé decided to reclaim the name, as it appears in past film credits and unreleased recordings dated back to 2005, for branding reasons as she herself clarified on her official site. "I feel Santana is a name which is already branded in the music world and i like creating my own name and pulling my own weight", she states.

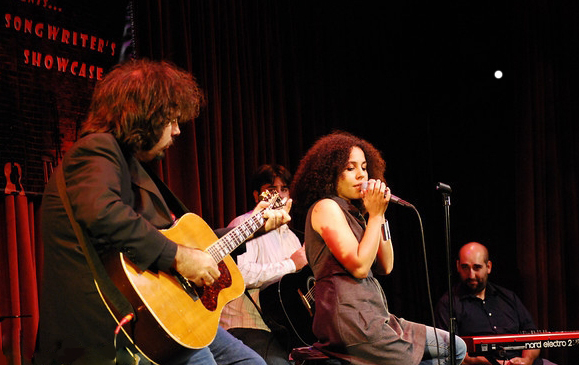
Lizé Santana and Fernando Perdomo at the Chrystal Hartigan presents Songwriters showcase in November 2009.

== Musical style and influences ==
Lizé blends both an organic and ethereal tone to her music, classified as pop rock, folk rock, rock en español and latin pop. Her music is characterized by its melancholic strings and vocal harmonies; instrumental textures that serves as a backdrop to empowering and emotionally rich lyrics, which often include word play, metaphor and irony.

She credits her parents for her rather vast musical horizons. Their record collection included music from artists such as The Beatles, Blondie to Juan Luis Guerra. As an adult, Lizé's other influences included singers Sarah McLachlan, Tori Amos and Ani Difranco as well as Latin songstresses Amanda Miguel, Rocío Dúrcal and Isabel Pantoja.

== Label independence ==
Ownership of Rocstar, Inc. makes Lizé Santana the first woman artist in the Latin music market to be released under her own independent label. This independence, also allows her a great deal of artistic freedom. For example, on her 2009 album Aún Sueño En Ti | I Still Dream of You, Lizé co-produced and co-arranged the music, played some of the instruments, executive produced the album, and was also involved in much of the artwork and design for the packaging. She also likes to give her input in the direction of her music videos and photography themes.

== Film industry ==
Lizé has demonstrated an interest in the film industry. While in New York, she studied at The School for Film and Television, now called The New York Conservatory for Dramatic Arts. In 2008 she landed the role of Jenny in the short film "Mamnoh Love", a drama about a young Arab woman stuck between her father's traditional ways and her own decisions in relationships and life. She also performed in "Dos veces Ana" (2010), directed by Sergio Giral. In November 2019, she made an appearance in the second season, fifth episode entitled "Anger Iceberg" of the reality television show Cartel Crew which aired on the VH1 network.

== Philanthropic activities ==
Lizé Santana founded Dream of You, a Non-profit organization and foundation, which main purpose is to contribute to education from a motivational and inspiring perspective to junior high and high school students. One of the organization's projects is an event, to bring motivational speakers and high-profile individuals, primarily from the arts and entertainment industries to schools in low income cities, to speak, interact, uplift and motivate kids to follow their dreams and strive to reach their full potential. Also, in this event, teachers who have had a significant positive impact in the lives of their students receive award recognitions. Teachers are nominated by students. In addition, to further strengthen her organization, Lizé has joined "The Quincy Jones Musiq Consortium", an organization sponsored by Quincy Jones, where leaders from all parts of the music industry and music education join together to share resources, networks and their passion for music and education.

Lizé also supports Voices for Children and the Guardian Ad Litem Program, an organization which advocates for the best interests of children who are abused, neglected, or abandoned and who are involved in dependency court proceedings.

In addition, she supports Norml.

== Discography ==
=== Studio albums ===
- Aún Sueño En Ti | I Still Dream of You (2009) (as Lizette Santana),

=== Singles ===
- Extrañandote Estoy (2009) (as Lizette Santana)
- Better this Way (2010) through Forward Motion Records (as Lizette Santana)
- Besos (2011) (as Lizé)
- Dejarte Aqui (2011) (as Lizé)
- I Surrender/Hoy Me Rindo (2014) (as Lizé)
- I Surrender (Juan Control Remix) (2016)

=== Live albums ===
- Cansada / Out of You (2011)
