= The Reincarnate =

1971 Canadian film

- Directed by: Don Haldane
- Written by: Seeleg Lester
- Produced by: Seeleg Lester
- Starring: Jack Creley; Jay Reynolds; Trudy Young; Hugh Webster
- Cinematography: Norman C. Allin
- Edited by: George Appleby
- Music by: Milan Kymlicka
- Production company: Meridian Films
- Release date: April 30, 1971
- Running time: 122 minutes
- Country: Canada
- Language: English

The Reincarnate is a Canadian horror film, directed by Don Haldane and released in 1971. The film stars Jack Creley as Everett Julian, a lawyer who is actually the latest incarnation of an 8,000-year-old entity; as his current body is in decline, however, he must find a new host to take over his mind and memories before his body dies, and selects David Payne (Jay Reynolds), a young artist.

The cast also includes Trudy Young, Hugh Webster, Gene Tyburn, Rex Hagon, Colin Fox, Terry Tweed, Patrick Boxill, Alan Clowes, Gerald Crack, Marcia Diamond, Stuart Gillard, Ron Hartmann, Linda Houston, John Kerr, Anthony Kramreither and Gail Malenfant in supporting roles.

== Production and distribution ==
The film was shot in Kleinburg, Ontario in 1970.

The film went into commercial release in April 1971, and later saw limited release in the United States. It was entered into competition at the 23rd Canadian Film Awards.

== Critical response ==
Daniel Stoffman of the Toronto Star reviewed the film negatively, writing that "one reason the movie doesn't work is that the 8,000-year-old man shows no sign of possessing the wisdom of his years. Creley struggles mightily, but there's nothing he can do about a script that makes him sound more senile than wise."

Gordon Stoneham of the Ottawa Citizen offered a similar assessment, writing that "technically the picture isn't too bad (although some of the cutting is sloppy) and the musical score has an appropriate touch of the mysterious to it. But in most respects The Reincarnate is the sort of movie you'd rather forget bears a Made-in-Canada tag."

Kevin Thomas of the Los Angeles Times wrote that "Creley's pursuit of Reynolds is so obsessive it elicits the feeling that the film is not really about what it says it's about and is actually the fantasy of a dying, lonely homosexual in the grip of a last grand passion. This interpretation at least makes more sense of the film than all its occult mumbo jumbo and bloody rituals do."
