= 10th Canadian Film Awards =

Canadian film awards ceremony

- Date: June 21, 1958
- Location: King Edward Hotel, Toronto, Ontario
- Hosted by: Davidson Dunton
- Most awards: City of Gold

The 10th Canadian Film Awards were held on June 21, 1958 to honour achievements in Canadian film.

After a year of discussion, consensus had been reached on rearrangement of categories and the judging system. For this year, more than 140 films were entered, but the roster included no features, which was due to distrust, or lack of interest, on the part of the independent film community--this situation persisted until 1964. Also, as so many had requested, this year's ceremony was a luncheon; its host was Canadian Broadcasting Corporation Chairman Davidson Dunton.

== Winners ==
- Film of the Year: City of Gold — National Film Board of Canada, Tom Daly producer, Colin Low and Wolf Koenig directors
- Feature Film: No entries submitted
- Theatrical Short: The Sceptre and the Mace — National Film Board of Canada, Nicholas Balla producer, John Howe director
- Arts and Experimental: Legend of the Raven — Crawley Films, Judith Crawley producer, Peter Cock and Edmund Reid directors

A Chairy Tale — National Film Board of Canada, Norman McLaren and Claude Jutra directors
City of Gold — National Film Board of Canada, Tom Daly producer, Colin Low and Wolf Koenig directors

- TV Information: Skidrow — Canadian Broadcasting Corporation, Allan King producer and director
- Films for Children: Le Vagabond et En roulant ma boule — Associated Screen Studios. L.R. Beaudry director
- Travel and Recreation: Stampede Stopover — Master Film Studios, Spence Crilly producer and director
- General Information: Canadian Profile — National Film Board of Canada, Tom Daly producer, Allan Wargon director

Canadian Wheat — Crawley Films, J. Stanley Moore producer and director

- Public Relations: Generator 4 — Crawley Films, F. R. Crawley, George Gorman and Gerard J. Raucamp producers, F. R. Crawley director
- Sales Promotion: Spirit of Algonquin — Ashley and Crippen, Edward Rollins producer, Douglas Sinclair director
- Training and Instruction: From Ten to Twelve — Crawley Films, Judith Crawley producer, Edmund Reid director

Emotional Maturity — Crawley Films, George Gorman producer and director

- Filmed Commercial: Orlon Acrylic Fibre — Omega Productions, Pierre Harwood producer
- Amateur: Three Pairs of Shoes — Ki-Wi Film Club of Hamilton
- Special Award:

Imperial Oil — "for its encouragement of high standards in Canadian film productions".
