= W. B. Scarth =

Canadian politician (1895–1983)

William Blakeman Scarth (May 24, 1895 – March 9, 1983) was a politician in Manitoba, Canada. He served in the Legislative Assembly of Manitoba from 1958 to 1962 as a Progressive Conservative.

The son of William Frederick Scarth and Nellie Blakeman, Scarth was born in Virden, Manitoba. During World War I, he served in the Canadian Expeditionary Force. Scarth was educated at the University of Manitoba, receiving a law degree, and then practised law in Flin Flon, Dauphin, The Pas and Winnipeg. In 1928, he married Clara Irene. Scarth served as president of Pascar Oils Ltd., and was director of Lylemore Petroleums Ltd. During the Second World War, he spent four years in the Royal Canadian Air Force with the Judge Advocate General's Branch.

He campaigned for the House of Commons of Canada in the federal election of 1940, running as a "National Government" (i.e. Conservative) candidate in the northern Manitoba riding of Churchill. He was defeated by Liberal cabinet minister Thomas Crerar.

He was first elected to the Manitoba legislature in the 1958 provincial election, defeating future Lieutenant Governor William John McKeag in the upscale Winnipeg constituency of River Heights. He was re-elected in the 1959 election, but did not run again in 1962. During his time in the legislature, Scarth was a backbench supporter of Dufferin Roblin's administration.

In 1963, Scarth was named to the Manitoba Utilities Board.

Scarth's son the Honourable Mr. Justice William B. Scarth was a Judge on the Supreme Court of British Columbia.
