= Glenn Sarty =

Canadian television producer

- Born: September 9, 1930; Halifax, Nova Scotia, Canada
- Died: February 6, 2007 (aged 76); Cape Cod, Massachusetts, United States
- Occupation: Television producer
- Years active: 1950–1988
- Employer: CBC News (1963–1985)
- Known for: Creator of The Fifth Estate

Glenn Sarty (September 9, 1930 – February 6, 2007) was a Canadian television producer who was involved in such shows as Take Thirty, The Fifth Estate and Adrienne at Large.

Sarty was involved in the creation of the CBC's Academy Award-winning The Fifth Estate.

Sarty died in his Cape Cod home in 2007 of emphysema.
