= Marcia Diamond =

Canadian actress (1925–2021)

- Born: Marcia Jean Diamond; 23 November 1925; Calgary, Alberta, Canada
- Died: 12 February 2021 (aged 95); Toronto, Ontario, Canada
- Occupation: Actress
- Years active: 1943–2015
- Spouse: Harry Cohen (1948-his death)

Marcia Diamond (23 November 1925 – 12 February 2021) was a Canadian actress.

Born in Calgary, Marcia attended school in Vancouver and participated in school broadcast over CBR. While at Northwestern University in Illinois in the 1940s, Marcia was heard in a number of plays on the Northwestern University Radio Playhouse productions.

Marcia was married to Harry Irving Cohen and had children.

== Partial filmography ==
- The Reincarnate (1971)
- Class of '44 (1973) - Mrs. Gilhuly
- Deranged (1974) - Jenny Kootz
- Black Christmas (1974) - Woman
- 125 Rooms of Comfort (1974) - Doris
- Ticket to Heaven (1981) - Esther
- Sing (1989) - Jewish Mother
- Sam & Me (1991) - Hannah Cohen
- PCU (1994) - Pampers Woman
- Spy Games (1999) - Lauren
- Phantom of the Megaplex (2000)-Verna
