= Do Not Fold, Staple, Spindle or Mutilate =

- Directed by: John Howe
- Written by: Millard Lampell
- Starring: Ed Begley; Harvey Sid Fisher; George Sperdakos; Bruno Gerussi; Cec Linder; Sean Sullivan; Al Waxman
- Cinematography: Eugene Boyko
- Edited by: John Howe; Dennis Sawyer
- Music by: Dave Brubeck
- Production company: National Film Board of Canada
- Release date: 1967
- Running time: 50 minutes
- Country: Canada
- Language: English
- Budget: $67,495

Do Not Fold, Staple, Spindle or Mutilate is a 1967 Canadian short drama film, directed by John Howe for the National Film Board of Canada. Written by American playwright and screenwriter Millard Lampell, the film stars Ed Begley.

== Plot ==
An established trade union leader fights an attempt by the union membership to push him out in favour of a new, younger leader with a more modern approach. The modern union wants to change the leadership without realizing how far their leader has brought them since the 1930s. As things heat up, both sides share their views with the old union leader speaking his mind and generally winning the debate. But, after a lifetime of service for the cause, he has outlived his usefulness and esteem among the workers of his factory. Times have changed, a new strategy is needed, and he realizes that he must retire.

== Soundtrack ==
Dave Brubeck composed the score for this film. It was recorded in his home studio in Wilton, Connecticut and became part of his album Summit Sessions.

== Awards ==
- Canadian Labour International Film Festival, Montreal: Grand Prize, 167 August 15, 1967
- 20th Canadian Film Awards, Toronto: Best Film Over 30 Minutes, 1968
- International Labour and Industrial Film, Antwerp: Award of Excellence, 1969
- International Labour and Industrial Film, Antwerp: Diploma of Merit, 1969

== Works cited ==
- Evans, Gary (1991). In the National Interest: A Chronicle of the National Film Board of Canada from 1949 to 1989. University of Toronto Press. ISBN 0802027849.
