= John Howe (filmmaker) =

Canadian director and producer (1926–2008)

- Born: 30 August 1926; Toronto, Canada
- Died: 18 August 2008 (aged 81); Warner, New Hampshire
- Occupations: Director, producer, writer, composer, educator
- Years active: 1952–2022
- Awards: see below

John Howe (August 30, 1926 – August 18, 2008) was a Canadian director, producer, and composer with the National Film Board of Canada. He is best known for his films Do Not Fold, Staple, Spindle or Mutilate and Why Rock the Boat?, and for his handling of the NFB’s 1969 Austerity Crisis.

== Early life ==
John Thomas Howe was born in Toronto, the son of Thomas and Margret Ogilvy (Manzie) Howe. At age 18, he joined the Royal Regiment of Canadian Artillery, saw action in Europe, and in 1946, left the service with the rank of Captain. Upon his return to Canada, he went to the University of Toronto, graduating in 1950.

== Career ==
While in university, Howe worked as a director's assistant at the Canadian Repertory Theatre, and as a freelance reporter for the CBC. He also appeared in two episodes of two CBC television series: Space Command and Encounter. In 1955, he was hired by the National Film Board of Canada where he stayed for 28 years, directing, producing, and/or writing 52 films, some in both English and French. He was also a keen composer and wrote the music for some of his productions.

Howe was very active in industry associations. In addition to his memberships with the Alliance of Canadian Cinema, Television and Radio Artists (ACTRA), and the Directors Guild of America, he was past president of the Society of Composers, Authors, and Music Publishers of Canada (SOCAN), past president (board, film division) of the Canada Council for the Arts and past president of the Syndicat général du cinéma et de la télévision (SGCT). The latter was the union of all NFB production staff and Howe was its president during the Austerity Crisis of 1969.

== Austerity crisis of 1969 ==
In 1969, Prime Minister Pierre Trudeau had taken a "no free lunch" position and stated that he intended to cut the size of the civil service by 10%. At this time, the NFB was known to be over-staffed and producers routinely overspent their budgets by as much as 200%. Some filmmakers were known to be using NFB facilities for their side projects; others were known to be using their positions for political purposes. The NFB was a natural target for cost-cutting and its commissioner, Hugo McPherson, had to find ways to streamline the organization.

McPherson's solution was to close regional offices, freeze the annual budget, cut half of the films sponsored by government departments, charge people to view NFB films and cut personnel—25% of English staff, 11.5% of French personnel. However, the union had just negotiated a $1.249 million increase in salaries. McPherson's cuts meant that the increase would be just $260,000.

In August 1969, Howe formed a crisis committee. Initially, the committee kept the situation out of the public eye and pressured ministers and officials until the Treasury Board allotted another $1 million for salaries. McPherson was unwilling to come up with the shortfall or change his position on other measures. There was no declared strike, but production came to a halt. As no progress was being made, Howe spoke to the Globe and Mail, accusing the government of union-busting and betraying the national trust. Letters streamed in from Canada and around the world. The public pressure forced McPherson to drop the idea of user fees. The work stoppage meant that there were no expenditures so the NFB had the money to cover the salary shortfall. The union sued to prevent lay-offs; in the end, fewer than 50 personnel members were laid off; most through retirement.

== Academia ==
In 1983, Howe left the NFB to become an associate professor at the department of cinema and television at the University of Southern California, Los Angeles, where he would stay until his retirement in 1996.

== Personal life and death ==
In 1974, Howe married Beverley Jean Luchuck; they had five children, four of whom pre-deceased their parents. Upon retirement, Howe and his wife had settled at the family's summer home in Warner, New Hampshire; he died there, of natural causes, on August 18, 2008.

== Filmography ==
- Invasion from the South - documentary short, 1956 - writer and director
- Our Northern Citizen - documentary short, Perspective series, 1956 - writer and director
- North of 60 - documentary short, 1956 - writer and director
- Canada's Air Defence - documentary short, 1957 - writer and director
- Poverty and Plenty - documentary short, 1957 - director
- R.C.A.F. Air Defence Command - documentary short, 1957 - writer and director
- The Invisible Keystone - documentary short, 1957 - director
- Black and White in South Africa - documentary short, 1957 - director
- Colonialism: Ogre or Angel? - documentary short, 1957 - director
- The Sceptre and the Mace - documentary short, 1957 - director
- They Called it White Man’s Burden - documentary short, 1957 - director
- The Awakening Mackenzie - documentary short, Hector Lemieux, 1958 - producer
- Down North - documentary short, 1958 - lyricist, writer, producer
- Why Canada? - documentary short, Edmund Reid 1958 - producer
- Here and There - The St. Lawrence Seaway, Part 1: Lifeline - documentary short, 1958 - writer, producer, director
- Here and There - The St. Lawrence Seaway, Part 2: Power - documentary short, 1958 - producer, director
- Here and There - The St. Lawrence Seaway, Part 3: Bottleneck - documentary short, 1958 - producer, director
- The St. Lawrence Seaway - documentary short, 1959 - writer, producer, director
- The Queen’s Plate - documentary short, 1959 - writer, producer and director
- Summary Trials - training film, 1959 - director
- Canada on Stage - documentary short, 1960 - director
- The Test - short film, 1961 - director
- Vote for Michalski - short film, 1961 - director
- Lord Durham - short film, 1961 - director
- Robert Baldwin: A Matter of Principle - short film, 1961 - director
- Yukon Old, Yukon New - documentary short, 1961 - director
- Mathematics at Your Fingertips - documentary short, 1961 - director
- Georges-Étienne Cartier: The Lion of Québec - short film, 1962 - director
- Gone Curling - documentary short, 1963 - director
- The Head Men - documentary short, 1963 - director
- Wedding Day - documentary short, 1963 - director
- Portrait of the Artist - documentary short, 1964 - director
- David and Hazel: A Story in Communication - short film, 1964 - director
- Jamie: The Story of a Sibling - short film, 1964 - director
- The Hundredth Summer - documentary, Terence Macartney-Filgate 1964 - producer
- Canadians Can Dance - documentary short, 1966 - producer and director
- Ducks, of Course - documentary short, 1966 - director
- The Meeting - short film, Morten Parker 1966 - producer
- Long Ways to Go - short film, 1966 - director
- The Shattered Silence - short film, Morten Parker 1966 - producer
- Where Mrs. Whalley Lives - short film, Graham Parker 1966 - producer
- Labour College - documentary short, Mort Ransen 1966 - producer
- Do Not Fold, Staple, Spindle or Mutilate - drama, 1967 - editor, director
- A Pleasant Duty - documentary, 1971 - director
- Why I Sing - documentary, 1972 - director
- Star - feature, 1974 - composer, writer, director
- A Star is Lost! - feature, 1974 - composer, writer, director
- Why Rock the Boat? - feature, 1974 - composer, director
- Strangers at the Door - short film, 1977 - producer, director
- Teach Me to Dance - short film, Anne Wheeler 1978 - producer
- A Choice of Two - drama, 1981 - composer, editor, producer, director
- Excuse Me, But There's a Computer Asking for You - documentary short, 1983 - editor, producer, director

== Awards ==
The Sceptre and the Mace (1957)

- 10th Canadian Film Awards, Toronto: Best Theatrical Short, 1958

The Queen’s Plate (1959)

- International Sports Film Festival, Cortina d'Ampezzo, Italy: Diploma of Merit, 1961

Mathematics at Your Fingertips (1961)

- 15th Canadian Film Awards, Montreal: Genie Award for Best Film, Training and Instruction, 1963
- Columbus International Film & Animation Festival, Columbus, Ohio: Chris Certificate, Information/Education, 1964

The Test (1961)

- American Film and Video Festival, New York: Blue Ribbon, Ethnical Problems, 1962
- Yorkton Film Festival, Yorkton, Saskatchewan: First Prize, Sociological 1962
- Columbus International Film & Animation Festival, Columbus, Ohio: Chris Certificate, Adult Education, 1969

Yukon Old, Yukon New (1961)

- Columbus International Film & Animation Festival, Columbus, Ohio: Chris Certificate, Commercial Travel 1962

Where Mrs. Whalley Lives (1966)

- Columbus International Film & Animation Festival, Columbus, Ohio: Chris Certificate, Mental Health, 1966

Do Not Fold, Staple, Spindle or Mutilate (1967)

- Canadian Labour International Film Festival, Montreal: Grand Prize, 167 August 15, 1967
- 20th Canadian Film Awards, Toronto: Genie Award for Best Film Over 30 Minutes, 1968
- International Labour and Industrial Film, Antwerp: Award of Excellence, 1969
- International Labour and Industrial Film, Antwerp: Diploma of Merit, 1969

Why Rock the Boat? (1974)

- Chicago International Film Festival, Chicago: Bronze Hugo, 1974

Teach Me to Dance (1978)

- Child of our Time Festival, Milan: Diploma of Honour, 1979
