= 125 Rooms of Comfort =

1974 Canadian film

- Directed by: Patrick Loubert
- Written by: Patrick Loubert; Victor Coleman
- Produced by: Don Haig
- Starring: Tim Henry; Jackie Burroughs; Robert A. Silverman
- Cinematography: Henri Filks
- Edited by: Thomas Berner
- Production company: Canadian Film Development Corporation
- Release date: November 7, 1974
- Running time: 81 minutes
- Country: Canada
- Language: English

125 Rooms of Comfort is a 1974 Canadian drama film directed by Patrick Loubert. The movie stars Tim Henry, Jackie Burroughs, Robert A. Silverman and Les Barker. The film premiered at the Canada Filmexpo in November 1974.

== Plot ==
The film is about a run down hotel in St. Thomas, Ontario, which is the location for a stag party, which features a stand-up comedy act by a washed up comedian. The hotel is also subject to being sold to a greedy buyer, Oscar Kidd, from the United States.

When his father's will leaves him possession of the hotel, Billie Joyce, a gay former musician who has been involuntarily institutionalized in a psychiatric institutions by his family since showing up to his father's funeral in drag, refuses to acquiesce to the sale.

The films climax results in Billie being discovered in drag by some drunken hotel guests, who insult him by calling him a faggot, and proceed to beat him to death and leave him in the alley behind the hotel. Kidd revels in his death, because now the sale of the hotel can proceed without further interference.

== Cast ==
- Tim Henry as Billie Joyce
- Jackie Burroughs as Bobbie Kidd
- Robert Warner as Jim McKeagan
- Robert A. Silverman as Oscar Kidd
- Les Barker as Leo Basho
- Sean Sullivan as Jack
- Michael Lewis as Pete
- Jackie Crossland as Marge
- Marcia Diamond as Doris
- Russ Little as Announcer
- Leonard Glenn as Byron Joyce
- Bob Vinci as Couple in Bed
- Enza Vinci as Couple in Bed

== Background and production ==
The film was shot in location in St. Thomas, Ontario. The movie's title refers to the Grand Central Hotel in St. Thomas. Earlier working titles for the movie included "Johnny Canuck" and "The Adventures of Johnny Canuck", which refers to a Canadian comic book hero of the 1940s with whom the nightclub comedian in the film identifies with. It was also the first film that Don Haig produced. According to the director, Patrick Loubert, the character named Billie, is based on a real life "queen character" the filmmakers knew, and was offered a screen test, but "seemed too unstable to count on for the project."

Canadian film critic Thomas Waugh observed that the film only had one or two screenings, and then faded into oblivion. He said that the films failure can be attributed to the Canadian Film Development Corporations interference, who were constantly removing the sex and violence scenes from the script. However, Loubert and Haig were able to restore some of them, including the queer-bashing scene. Robert Fothergill argued in Cinema Canada that the Canadian Film Development Corporation was "justified in demanding re-writes, and should be condemned not for deflowering the original script, but for failing to insist upon its further development."

== Critical response ==
Cinema Canada wrote that "we simply are not made to care about the characters, so that what happens to them is never a matter of great concern to the viewer; the two separate stories of the comic and the co-owner never do come together satisfactorily; it seems that the makers of this film attempted too much; ambition should be made of sterner stuff."

Critic Noel Taylor wrote that the film is "not the kind of movie to go raising roof beams about; it's a small film about small people and it is very modestly Canadian, which is about as complimentary as one can get about it." Film critic Gerald Pratley wrote "the owner dies and the manager wants to sell it, but the son refuses, this causes upsets both serious and amusing that keep this likeable little film moving along among the mixed collection of guests."

== Awards ==
The film was a nominee for Best Feature Film at the 26th Canadian Film Awards in 1975, but did not win.

== See also ==
- Cinema of Canada
- List of Canadian films of 1974
- List of LGBTQ-related films of 1974
