= Cec Linder =

Canadian actor (1921–1992)

- Linder as paleontologist Doctor Matthew Roney in the BBC Television serial Quatermass and the Pit (1958–59)
- Born: Cecil Yekuthial Linder; March 10, 1921; Radziechowy, Galicia, Poland
- Died: April 10, 1992 (aged 71); Toronto, Ontario, Canada
- Education: Lorne Greene Academy of Radio Arts
- Occupation: Actor
- Years active: 1955–92

Cecil Yekuthial Linder (March 10, 1921 – April 10, 1992) was a Polish-born Canadian film and television actor. He was Jewish and managed to escape Poland before the Holocaust. In the 1950s and 1960s, he worked extensively in the United Kingdom, often playing Canadian and American characters in various films and television programmes.

In television, he is best remembered for playing Dr. Matthew Roney in the BBC serial Quatermass and the Pit (1958–59). In film, he is best remembered for his role as James Bond's friend, CIA agent Felix Leiter, in Goldfinger (1964). Another well-known film in which he appeared was Lolita (1962), as Doctor Keegee.

== Career ==
Linder was raised in Timmins, Ontario, where his father was a rabbi to the Jewish community. During the early years of his professional career, Linder worked as an announcer at CKGB in Timmins.

Linder accumulated more than 225 credits in film and television productions in a long performing career. He had an extensive television career on both sides of the Atlantic. In the UK, probably his most prominent role was as the palaeontologist Roney in the original BBC version of Quatermass and the Pit (1958–59). In the United States, he was a regular in the CBS soap operas The Secret Storm and The Edge of Night and in the 1980s appeared in several of the Perry Mason revival TV films as District Attorney Jack Welles. He was also a regular on the popular 1980s Canadian crime series Seeing Things, playing Crown Attorney Spenser.

Linder had guest roles in episodes of a variety of other popular British, American and Canadian television programmes, including: The Forest Rangers, Doomwatch, The Littlest Hobo, Voyage to the Bottom of the Sea (TV series), Alfred Hitchcock Presents, Ironside, The Saint, Danger Bay, The New Avengers, The Secret Storm (as Peter Ames), and The Edge of Night as Senator Ben Travis #2.

Linder appeared as Inspector Cramer in the CBC 1982 radio dramatizations of Nero Wolfe short stories. His last work was as Syd Grady in two episodes of the television series Sweating Bullets (1991). He died the following year at Mount Sinai Hospital in Toronto of complications from emphysema.

== Selected filmography ==
- Flaming Frontier (1958) as Capt. Dan Carver
- Subway in the Sky (1959) as Carson
- Jet Storm (1959) as Colonel Coe
- SOS Pacific (1959) as Willy
- Too Young to Love (1959) as Mr. Bill
- Crack in the Mirror (1960) as Murzeau
- Lolita (1962) as Dr. Keegee
- Goldfinger (1964) as Felix Leiter
- The Verdict (Edgar Wallace Mysteries) (1964) as Joe Armstrong
- Tecnica di un omicidio (1966) as Gastel
- Quentin Durgens, M.P. (1966) as Sherwin
- Do Not Fold, Staple, Spindle or Mutilate (1967)
- Explosion (1969) as Mr. Evans
- Innocent Bystanders (1972) as Mankowitz
- The Sloane Affair (1973) as Roy Maxwell
- Super Bitch (1973) as American Ambassador
- A Touch of Class (1973) as Wendell Thompson
- To Kill the King (1974) as Stephen Van Birchard
- Old God Knows (1974) as Mr. Klein
- Why Rock the Boat? (1974) as Carmichael
- Sunday in the Country (1974) as Ackerman
- Second Wind (1976) as Graham
- Point of No Return (1976) as Professor Johns
- The Clown Murders (1976) as The Developer
- Age of Innocence (1977) as Dr. Hogarth
- Deadly Harvest (1977) as Henry the Chairman
- Three Dangerous Ladies (1977) as Dr. Carstairs (segment: "The Mannikin")
- The Case of Barbara Pasons (1978) as Loren Bowley
- Drága kisfiam (1978) as Mr. George
- Tomorrow Never Comes (1978) as Milton
- High-Ballin' (1978) as Policeman
- I Miss You, Hugs and Kisses (1978) as Chief Parker
- Something's Rotten (1979) as Alexis Alexander
- City on Fire (1979) as Councilman Paley
- Lost and Found (1979) as Mr. Sanders
- An American Christmas Carol (1979) as Auctioneer
- Virus (1980) as Dr. Latour
- Atlantic City (1980) as President of Hospital
- Deadly Eyes (1982) as Dr. Louis Spenser
- Heavenly Bodies (1985) as Walter Matheson
- Honeymoon (1985) as Barnes

Preceded by Jack Lord	Felix Leiter actor 1964	Succeeded by Rik Van Nutter
