= Stuart Gillard =

Canadian film, writer, producer and television director

- Born: Stuart Thomas Gillard; April 28, 1950 (age 76); Coronation, Alberta, Canada
- Occupations: Actor, director, writer, producer
- Years active: 1971–present

Stuart Thomas Gillard (born April 28, 1950) is a Canadian film director, writer, producer, actor and television director. He is best known for directing the films Teenage Mutant Ninja Turtles III (1993) and RocketMan (1997). He also wrote and directed the romance film Paradise in 1982, his directing debut.

As a television director, Gillard's credits include Bordertown, The Outer Limits, the original Charmed and its reboot series, One Tree Hill and 90210. He has also directed numerous television films, many for ABC Family and Disney Channel such as Girl vs. Monster and Twitches.

As an actor, Gillard won the Canadian Film Award for Best Actor in 1975 for his performance as a journalist in the film Why Rock the Boat?, and appeared in the 1970s sitcom Excuse My French.

== Acting filmography ==
Year	Title	Role	Notes
1971	The Reincarnate		
1972	The Rowdyman	Constable Bill	
1973	The Neptune Factor	Diver Phil Bradley	
1974	Why Rock the Boat?	Barnes - lead	
1976	Excuse My French	Peter	
1978	F.I.S.T.	Phil Talbot	
1980	Virus	Dr. Ed Meyer	
1981	Threshold	Dick Getts	
1985	Doin' Time	Sen. Hodgkins	
