= Jackie Lance =

Canadian softball player

Jackie Lindsey (competed as Jackie Lance) (born June 9, 1974) is a Canadian softball shortstop, second base, and right fielder.

Born in Grande Prairie, Alberta, Lance began playing softball at age eight, and is a graduate of the University of New Mexico (as Jackie Van Hooydonk). She was a part of the Canadian Softball team which finished eighth at the 2000 Summer Olympics and fifth at the 2004 Summer Olympics.
