= Brampton Centennial Secondary School shooting =

School shooting

Coordinates: 43.667456°N 79.749128°W

- Michael Slobodian in 1975
- Location: Brampton, Ontario, Canada
- Date: May 28, 1975; 51 years ago 11:35 a.m. (EDT)
- Target: Margaret Wright, Ross Bronson
- Attack type: School shooting; murder-suicide; mass shooting
- Weapons: Marlin Model 444 .444-calibre lever-action rifle; Ruger 10/22 Sporter .22-calibre semi-automatic rifle
- Deaths: 3 (including the perpetrator)
- Injuries: 13
- Perpetrator: Michael Peter Slobodian
- Motive: Revenge against two teachers, as well as the school system

On May 28, 1975, a school shooting occurred at Brampton Centennial Secondary School in Brampton, Ontario, Canada. The perpetrator, 16-year-old Michael Slobodian, a student at the school, shot and killed two people and injured 13 others before committing suicide.

== Shooting ==
Michael Slobodian, a 16-year-old student at the school, had been skipping classes, prompting his teacher, Margaret Wright, to contact his parents. When Slobodian returned home during a mid-morning break, his mother confronted him about the absences. He subsequently wrote a note to his family stating: "I am going to eliminate certain people from this world. Those people are: Mrs. Wright, Mr. Bronson and any other sucker who gets in my way. I am then going to kill myself so as not to be imprisoned."

Slobodian returned to school with two rifles in a guitar case. He also carried 70 rounds (50 .22 rounds + 20 .444 rounds) of ammunition to the school. He moved to a washroom on the ground floor of the school. In the washroom, he entered a toilet cubicle to prepare his weapons while leaving the cubicle's door open. As Slobodian was preparing the rifles, John Slinger and another student walked in on him and noticed the guns. Slobodian shouted to them: "Get out of here. I don't want to shoot you". As the two students turned away from Slobodian, he opened fire on them with his .22-calibre Ruger semi-automatic rifle. He fired seven times, killing Slinger and wounding two other students. Slobodian stepped out of the washroom and fired a single shot from the .22 rifle towards a classroom, wounding two students.

Slobodian then switched to his Marlin .444 rifle and fired at a different classroom twice, wounding two students. Slobodian walked northbound towards an east/west intersection in the hallway. At the intersection, Slobodian fired a shot west, injuring four students with shrapnel. He then fired a shot east, grazing a student.

He proceeded to an art classroom, killed Wright and wounded two more students with two shots. Witnesses in the art classroom described Slobodian stopping at the doorway and putting down the Ruger rifle. Wright, recognizing the shooter, stated: "Mike" before Slobodian raised the Marlin rifle in response. Wright tried to run away but was shot in the back, with the bullet exiting her chest and hitting another student.

After shooting up the art classroom, Slobodian returned to the hallway and killed himself with an upwards shot through the chin. He died adjacent to the art classroom. In addition to the three dead (including himself), Slobodian had wounded 13 others. It was determined that Slobodian fired eight shots from the .22-calibre Ruger rifle and seven shots, including the suicide shot, from the .444-calibre Marlin rifle.

Witnesses of the shooting included students Cathy and Nancy Davis, the daughters of then Ontario Premier William Davis. Another witness was Scott Thompson, of the Kids in the Hall, who was in the same English class with Slobodian that was taught by Wright. Thompson has stated that the 24-year-old Wright, who was six months pregnant, had been his favourite teacher and the first person to encourage his writing talents.

== See also ==
- List of school-related attacks
