= Sherri Field =

Canadian field hockey player

Sherri Field (born March 13, 1972, in Moncton, New Brunswick) is a former field hockey player from Canada, who represented her native country at the 1992 Summer Olympics in Barcelona. There she ended up in seventh place with the Canadian National Team. She is now the director of athletics at Kingsway College School in Etobicoke.
