= Ovivo (company) =

Canadian water technology provider company

- Industry: environmental services
- Headquarters: Montreal, Canada
- Number of employees: 1,500 (2025)
- Website: www.ovivowater.com

Ovivo is a water and wastewater treatment and purification company. The company is owned by SKion Water GmbH, a subsidiary of German entrepreneur Susanne Klatten’s investment holding SKion GmbH. Ovivo's Head Office is located in Montreal, in the province of Quebec (Canada). It has 36 offices spread across 18 different countries.

Ovivo provides equipment, technology and services for the treatment and purification of water and wastewater for both industrial and municipal markets. As of 2023, Ovivo incorporates over a dozen different brands that were acquired over the past decade. The company’s main competitors are Veolia, Evoqua Water Technologies Corporation, Xylem Inc., Kurita Water Industries and Organo Corporation.

== History ==
=== 1975–2014 ===
In June 1975, Canadian businessmen Laurent Verreault and Louis Laperrière cofounded Laperrière & Verreault Inc. (L&V) in Trois-Rivières, Quebec... Over the preceding years Verreault also established La Société de Fabrication des Vieilles Forges Inc. (1978) and Constructions Laperrière et Verreault Inc. (1981) and acquired Les Services Maxi-Plus Inc. All four affiliated companies would eventually merge on March 31, 1986, under the name Groupe Laperrière & Verreault Inc.

Groupe Laperrière & Verreault Inc., or GL&V as it was often known, went public in June 1986 on the Montreal Exchange.

In the early 1990s, a Process Group was created to focus on intellectual property, technology development and replacement plans, and parts for clients of GL&V. Significant growth began in 2000, focused on acquisition, particularly in Europe. During this period, a Water Treatment Group was created within the organization and numerous trademarks were acquired, including EWT™ (EIMCO Water Technologies).

In 2007, the Process Group was sold to FLSmidth & Co. A/S for CA$950 million. The remaining two groups, Pulp & Paper and Water Treatment, continued operating as part of a new publicly traded company called GLV Inc.

=== 2014–present ===
In November 2014, GLV sold the Pulp & Paper Group for $65 million CA to focus exclusively on water treatment and purification. The entire company then changed its name to Ovivo Inc. and remained a public company, traded on the Toronto Stock Exchange. Marc Barbeau, who was the president of the Ovivo Group while it was part of GLV, became the President and Chief Executive Officer of the new company.

SKion Water GmbH (a 70% owner) and la Caisse de dépôt et placement du Québec (a 30% owner) acquired all issued and outstanding shares of Ovivo Inc. and privatized the company. Ovivo Inc. was withdrawn from the Toronto Stock Exchange on 13 July 2016.

Following privatization, Ovivo underwent another period of growth through acquisition, resulting in the purchase of FilterBoxx in 2018, Varec Biogas in 2019, Alar in 2020, Cembrane in 2022, and Wastech Controls & Engineering LLC.

In 2021, Ovivo's plans to construct a new manufacturing facility in Hutto, Texas were approved by the Hutto City Council

In the same year, Ovivo partnered with the One Drop Foundation, created by Cirque du Soleil founder Guy Laliberté, committing $750,000 CA over three years.
