= Why Rock the Boat? =

- Directed by: John Howe
- Written by: William Weintraub
- Produced by: William Weintraub
- Starring: Stuart Gillard; Tiiu Leek
- Cinematography: Savas Kalogeras
- Edited by: Marie-Hélène Guillemin
- Music by: John Howe
- Production company: National Film Board
- Distributed by: Columbia Pictures
- Release date: 1974
- Running time: 113 minutes
- Country: Canada
- Language: English
- Budget: $450,000

Why Rock the Boat? is a 1974 Canadian romantic comedy film directed by John Howe. The film stars Stuart Gillard and also includes Henry Beckman, Sean Sullivan, Cec Linder, Maurice Podbrey, Patricia Hamilton, Jean-Pierre Masson, Henry Ramer and Peter MacNeill.

The screenplay was written by journalist and humorist William Weintraub, as an adaptation of his own comic novel. Notably, he dropped the novel's most famous scene, which took place in a nudist colony, due to concerns that the scene would cause problems for the film's content rating.

== Plot ==
Harry Barnes is a young journalist in Montreal who becomes romantically involved with Julia Martin, a reporter for a competing newspaper who is organizing to unionize their industry.

== Production ==
The film had a budget of $450,000 (equivalent to $2,820,229 in 2025).

== Awards ==
The film received two Canadian Film Awards in 1975, for Best Actor (Gillard) and Best Supporting Actor (Beckman). It was a nominee for Best Feature Film, but did not win. It won the Bronze Hugo at the 1974 Chicago International Film Festival.

== Works cited ==
- Evans, Gary (1991). In the National Interest: A Chronicle of the National Film Board of Canada from 1949 to 1989. University of Toronto Press. ISBN 0802027849.
