= Sean Sullivan (actor) =

Canadian actor (1921–1985)

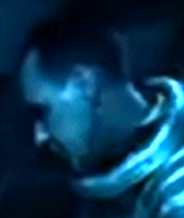
- Sullivan as Dr Michaels in 2001: A Space Odyssey
- Born: December 26, 1921
- Died: June 3, 1985 (aged 63)
- Occupation: Actor
- Years active: 1957–1985

Sean Sullivan (December 26, 1921 – June 3, 1985) was a Canadian actor. He is most noted for his stage and television performances in productions of David French's play Of the Fields, Lately, for which he won an ACTRA Award in 1977 as Best Television Actor for the CBC Television film; and his film performances in Springhill, for which he won a Canadian Film Award as Best Actor in a Non-Feature Film in 1972, and The Boy in Blue, for which he received a posthumous Genie Award nomination for Best Supporting Actor at the 7th Genie Awards in 1986.

Born and raised in Toronto, Ontario, he began his career as an actor when a stage play he appeared in in his 20s, Golden Boy, reached the finals of the Dominion Drama Festival. He soon began appearing in CBC Television productions, including episodes of the drama anthology series Playbill, CBC Summer Theatre, Folio and General Motors Theatre. His film roles included Nobody Waved Good-bye, The Young Ones, Why Rock the Boat?, 125 Rooms of Comfort, One Man, The Silent Partner, Atlantic City and The Grey Fox.

== Partial filmography ==
- A Dangerous Age (1957) - Police Officer
- During One Night (1960) - Major
- The Long Shadow (1961) - Burgen
- The Young Ones (1961) - Eddie
- Gang War (1962) - Al Hodges
- Nobody Waved Good-bye (1964) - Probation Officer
- Adulterous Affair (1966) - Frank
- Do Not Fold, Staple, Spindle or Mutilate (1967)
- 2001: A Space Odyssey (1968) - Dr. Bill Michaels
- Change of Mind (1969) - Mr. Robinson
- Flick (1970) - Prof. Preston
- Face-Off (1971) - Greg Walsh
- The Sloane Affair (1972)
- Springhill (1972)
- Pinocchio's Birthday Party (1973) - Giapetto
- Why Rock the Boat? (1974) - Herb Scannell
- 125 Rooms of Comfort (1974) - Jack
- Of the Fields, Lately (1976) - Jacob Mercer
- Deadly Harvest (1977) - Dr. George Abbott
- One Man (1977) - Rodney Porter
- The Silent Partner (1978) - Frank, Bank Guard
- Nothing Personal (1980) - Dean Collier
- Atlantic City (1980) - Buddy
- Silence of the North (1981) - Tattered Man
- The Grey Fox (1982) - Newspaper Editor
- The Dead Zone (1983) - Herb Smith
- Best Revenge (1984) - Paperman
- Heavenly Bodies (1984) - Real Estate Salesman
- Mrs. Soffel (1984) - Farmer
- The Boy in Blue (1986) - Walter (final film role)
