= Jacinthe Pineau =

Canadian swimmer

Personal information
- Full name: Jacinthe Maryse Pineau
- National team: Canada
- Born: April 26, 1974 (age 52) Sherbrooke, Quebec
- Height: 1.72 m (5 ft 8 in)
- Weight: 65 kg (143 lb)

Sport
- Sport: Swimming
- Strokes: Butterfly
- Club: Select de Sainte-Foy

Jacinthe Maryse Pineau (born April 26, 1974) is a Canadian former competition swimmer and butterfly specialist who represented Canada at the 1992 Summer Olympics in Barcelona, Spain. There she competed in the preliminary heats of the women's 200-metre butterfly, and finished 23rd overall.
