= Atlantic Pilotage Authority =

Canadian pilotage authority

Atlantic Pilotage Authority Canada; Administration de Pilotage de l'Atlantique
- Company type: Crown corporation
- Founded: February 1, 1972
- Headquarters: Halifax, Nova Scotia, Canada
- Area served: Canadian Internal Waters in and around the provinces of New Brunswick, Prince Edward Island, Nova Scotia and Newfoundland and Labrador
- Key people: Sean Griffiths (CEO); David Anderson (COO)
- Services: Pilotage
- Website: www.atlanticpilotage.com

The Atlantic Pilotage Authority Canada (French: Administration de Pilotage de l'Atlantique) is a Crown corporation that enforces pilotage in Atlantic Canadian Internal Waters. It was established as a result of recommendations made by the Royal Commission on Pilotage in Canada, by the Pilotage Act, Section 18, on February 1, 1972 mandated to assist in pilotage in all Canadian waters in and around the provinces of New Brunswick, Prince Edward Island, Nova Scotia and Newfoundland and Labrador.

== Pilotage incidents ==
At the time of the Halifax Explosion in 1917, both the SS Imo and the SS Mont-Blanc were being guided by professional pilots.

On July 10, 2010, a French research ship, Fulmar, operated in Halifax harbour (where pilotage is mandatory) without a pilot, and reportedly came "frighteningly close" to two other ships.

== Auditor general review ==
In 2016, the Auditor General of Canada panned the authority, criticizing it for economic losses driven by artificially low pilotage rates, failed upkeep of corporate systems, lack of strategic planning, and issues with conflict of interest. The report was reviewed by the House of Commons Standing Committee on Public Accounts.
