= The Corpse Eaters =

- Film poster
- Directed by: Donald R. Passmore and Klaus Vetter
- Written by: Lawrence Zazelenchuk
- Produced by: Lawrence Zazelenchuk
- Starring: Michael Hopkins; Ed LeBreton; Terry London
- Cinematography: Klaus Vetter
- Edited by: Michelle Jones
- Production company: Maniac Productions
- Distributed by: Howard Mahler Films Films
- Release date: August 16, 1974
- Running time: 57 minutes
- Country: Canada
- Language: English
- Budget: $36,000 CAD

The Corpse Eaters is a Canadian, English-language 1974 horror cult film produced and set in Happy Valley, Sudbury, Ontario.

== Plot ==
The film begins at a funeral home where the mutilated body of a young man is being prepared. From there, the film shifts to the young man, his sister, and their companions on a wild picnic. They decide on a whim to spend the night in a graveyard where they perform a séance raising the dead. The majority of the action is conveyed through flashbacks and nightmare sequences.

== Production and exhibition ==
According to Caelum Vatnsdal’s book, They Came from Within, and The Corpse Eaters was produced in 1973 by a teenaged Zazelenchuk with a meager budget of $36,000 culled from the proceeds of his drive-in located in Sudbury. Because his first and only feature film had such a small budget, Zazelenchuk couldn’t afford his ideal star, John Carradine. Instead, Zazelenchuk brought local theatre performers and high school friends together to make what some consider Canada’s first gore film. Zazelenchuk financed, wrote, and produced the film. He is also credited with the special makeup effects. He left the direction to Donald R. Passmore, who was soon replaced with Klaus Vetter, who also served as the film's cinematographer.

On August 16, 1974, at the 69 Drive-In, The Corpse Eaters premiered in Sudbury. A successful local run followed before Zazalenchuk was offered $5,000 for distribution rights from distributor Howard Mahler under his banner Howard Mahler Films. The distributor, however, did not inform Zazelenchuk that he was purchasing the film without any intent on releasing it. It was used as a tax write-off and declared as a loss. The film was never released theatrically elsewhere.

The film faded into obscurity for years until Encore Home Video rediscovered it in 1993 and released it on DVD several years later, claiming to have transferred their copy from the only known surviving print. This version runs 57 minutes and is considered incomplete, making it a partially lost film. However, the original negatives still exist and are held at Library and Archives Canada (LAC).

== Availability ==
The original negatives, 35mm prints, and other source materials are held at Library and Archives Canada (LAC). As of 2020, the film is still under copyright, with the rights being held by Don Zazelenchuk. The copyright, however, should expire no later than 2024 (50 years from 1974), which would make it fall into the public domain and allow it to be freely accessible for duplication.

A 35mm print is also available at the Kinsey Institute of Indiana University.
