= Robert A. Silverman =

Canadian actor

- Born: Robert Andrew Silverman; February 24, 1938 (age 88); Montreal, Quebec, Canada
- Other name: Bob Silverman
- Occupation: Actor
- Years active: 1964–2004
- Spouse: Mary Kreggor (1979–1987)
- Partner: Greg Stephenson (1989–present)

Robert A. Silverman (born February 24, 1938) is a Canadian actor known for his collaborations with director David Cronenberg.

Silverman received a Genie Award nominee for Best Supporting Actor at the 1st Genie Awards in 1980 for The Brood, and was nominated in 2003 for a Gemini Award for Best Performance by an Actor in a Guest Role in a Dramatic Series in The Eleventh Hour.

Silverman has been cast by Cronenberg in the following films:

- eXistenZ (1999) as D'Arcy Nader
- Naked Lunch (1991) as Hans
- Scanners (1981) as Benjamin Pierce
- The Brood (1979) as Jan Hartog
- Rabid (1977) as Man In Hospital

== Filmography ==
Year	Title	Role(s)	Notes
1964	Sweet Substitute	Al	
1965	Winter Kept Us Warm	Unknown	
1974	125 Rooms of Comfort	Oscar Kidd	
1975	Performance	Yuli Daniel	Episode "The Trial of Sinyavsky and Daniel"
1976	It Seemed Like a Good Idea at the Time	The Lawyer	
1976	Partners	Hayes	
1977	Rabid	Man In Hospital	
1977	Maria	Unknown	TV movie
1978	One Night Stand	Nick	TV movie
1979	The Brood	Jan Hartog	
1980	Prom Night	Mr. Sanford Sykes	
1980	Head On	The Analyst	
1981	Scanners	Benjamin Pierce	
1988-1989	Friday the 13th: The Series	Jerry Scott / Archie Pierce	Episodes: "Faith Healer" and "Hate On Your Dial" respectively
1991	Naked Lunch	Hans	
1995	Waterworld	Hydroholic	
1996	Pacific Blue	Unknown	Episode: "The Enemy Within"
1999	eXistenZ	D'Arcy Nader	
2000	Twice in a Lifetime	Homeless Man / Hungry Diner	2 episodes
2001	Jason X	Dieter Perez	
2001	Blue Murder	Stuart Patton	Episode: "Asylum"
2002	The Eleventh Hour	David Cygnorat	Episode: "A Low Dishonest Decade"
2004	The Ruining	Henry Behrens	(final film role)
