= The Quincy Jones Musiq Consortium =

The Quincy Jones Musiq Consortium (QJMC) is an organization developed by Quincy Jones to promote access to music education for children. The first consortium summit was held in 2009.

The Executive Director of the QJMC is Madelyn Bonnot.

Part of the group's activity is creating music education curricula. The QJMC received a $20,000 grant from the Music Empowers Foundation to develop such a program for New Orleans-area schools. The group is also working on a curriculum of American music for school districts in Syracuse, New York.
