= Springhill (film) =

- Screenplay by: Ron Kelly
- Directed by: Ron Kelly
- Starring: Paul Bradley; Sean Sullivan; Ed McNamara
- Country of origin: Canada

Original release
- Release: March 22, 1972

Springhill is a Canadian dramatic television film, directed by Ron Kelly and broadcast in 1972. The film is a dramatization of the 1958 Springhill mine disaster, with a cast including Paul Bradley, Sean Sullivan, Ed McNamara, Leo Phillips and Mel Tuck. It was broadcast by CBC Television on March 22, 1972.

== Reception ==
The film faced some controversy, with survivors of the disaster expressing their opposition to having their experiences dramatized for television.

The film won two awards at the 24th Canadian Film Awards, for Best Actor, Non-Feature (Sullivan) and Best Art Direction (Harold Maxwell), and Kelly received an ACTRA Award nomination for Best Dramatic Writer at the 2nd ACTRA Awards.
