= Yannick Keith Lizé =

Canadian water polo player (born 1974)

Personal information
- Born: May 16, 1974 (age 52) Quebec City, Quebec, Canada
Medal record
Men's water polo
Representing Canada
Pan American Games
Bronze medal – third place	1999 Winnipeg	Team
Commonwealth Water Polo Championships
Gold medal – first place	2002 Manchester	Team

Yannick Keith Lizé (born May 16, 1974) is a former water polo player of Canada's national water polo team. He is currently Director of Engineering at Applied Micro Circuits Corporation. In 2008 he received his Ph.D. in engineering physics at École Polytechnique de Montréal. He competed at the World Championships in Perth, Australia in 1998 and the Olympic qualification tournaments of 1996 and 2000. He was part of the bronze medal-winning men's water polo team at the 1999 Pan American Games in Winnipeg, Manitoba. He is the brother of Olympic athlete Sandra Lizé, a member of the Canada women's national water polo team, that claimed the silver medal at the 2007 Pan American Games in Rio de Janeiro, Brazil.

== Personal ==
Married Amanda Lizé (née Bearman) on October 10, 2010, in Montreal, Quebec.
