= Adrienne at Large =

Canadian public affairs television show

- Presented by: Adrienne Clarkson; Glenn Sarty
- Country of origin: Canada
- No. of seasons: 1

Production
- Running time: 30 minutes

Original release
- Network: CBC Television
- Release: September 26, 1974 – January 2, 1975

Adrienne at Large is a Canadian half-hour public affairs television show. The show was broadcast on CBC Television at 10 p.m. on Thursdays from September 26, 1974, until January 2, 1975. Adrienne Clarkson and Glenn Sarty hosted the show.
