= Lawrence Zazelenchuk =

Canadian filmmaker

Lawrence Zazelenchuk was a Canadian film director, screenwriter, film producer and prosthetic makeup artist. He is best known for the 1974 zombie cult film The Corpse Eaters.

== Life and death ==
Little is known about the man and even less about his films. With savings from his work as a miner at Inco (now Vale Limited), Zazelenchuk purchased the now defunct 69 Drive-In in Sudbury.

He financed, wrote, produced, directed and did special makeup effects for a handful of short horror movies photographed on 16mm film with such titles as Attack of the Brain Demons, Revenge of the Mummy, and Jami (1969), which received an Honorable Mention from the Photographic Society of America's Ten Best of 1969.

After the completion of his feature The Corpse Eaters, he sold his drive-in and bought a hotel in Florida before drinking himself to death at the early age of 36.

Today, he is considered by many to be a Canadian Herschell Gordon Lewis.

== The Corpse Eaters ==
According to Caelum Vatnsdal's book They Came from Within, The Corpse Eaters was produced in 1973 by a teenaged Zazelenchuk with a meagre budget of $36,000 culled from the proceeds of his drive-in. Because his first and only feature film had such a small budget, Zazelenchuk couldn’t afford his ideal star, John Carradine. Instead, Zazelenchuk brought local bums and high school friends together to make what is essentially Canada’s first gore film. Zazelenchuk financed, wrote and produced the film. He is also credited with the special makeup effects. He left the direction to Donald R. Passmore, who was soon replaced with Klaus Vetter, who also served as the film's cinematographer.

On August 16, 1974, at the 69 Drive-In, The Corpse Eaters premiered in Greater Sudbury. A successful local run followed before Zazalenchuk was offered $5,000 for distribution rights from distributor Howard Mahler under his banner Howard Mahler Films. The distributor, however, did not inform Zazelenchuk that he was purchasing the film without any intent on releasing it. It was used as a tax write off, and declared as a loss. The film was never released theatrically elsewhere.

The film faded into obscurity for years until Encore Home Video released it on DVD in 1993, claiming to have transferred their copy from the only known surviving print. This version runs 57 minutes, and is considered incomplete, making it a partially lost film.
