= Excuse My French (1974 TV series) =

Canadian television sitcom

- Starring: Stuart Gillard; Lisa Charbonneau
- Country of origin: Canada
- No. of seasons: 2
- No. of episodes: 44

Production
- Running time: Approx. 22 minutes

Original release
- Network: CTV
- Release: 1974 – 1976

Excuse My French is a Canadian television sitcom, which aired on CTV from 1974 to 1976. Produced by CFCF-TV's Champlain Productions division, the series starred Stuart Gillard and Lisa Charbonneau as Peter and Marie-Louise Hutchins, a mixed anglophone-francophone couple living in Montreal and fighting the disapproval of their families.

The cast also included Earl Pennington as Peter's wealthy publisher father Charles, Paul Berval and Pierrette Beaudoin as Marie-Louise's parents Gaston and Thérèse Sauvé, and Daniel Gadouas as Marie-Louise's Quebec separatist brother Jean-Guy.

The series, produced in Montreal, was judged the best television show of the year by the Montreal branch of the Association of Canadian Television and Radio Artists in 1975.

Although popular in the ratings and with critics, the series ended in 1976 when Gillard moved to the United States to work as a writer for The Sonny & Cher Show.
