= William John McKeag =

Canadian politician

The Honourable William John McKeag CM OM CD

17th Lieutenant Governor of Manitoba
- In office September 2, 1970 – March 15, 1976
- Monarch: Elizabeth II
- Governors General: Roland Michener; Jules Léger
- Premier: Edward Schreyer
- Preceded by: Richard Spink Bowles
- Succeeded by: Francis Lawrence Jobin

Personal details
- Born: March 17, 1928 Winnipeg, Manitoba
- Died: August 23, 2007 (aged 79) Winnipeg, Manitoba
- Spouse: Dawn Campbell (m. 1951)
- Children: Janis (Clifton Richardson), Darcy (Tom Crawford), Kelly and Douglas (Onalea Gilbertson)
- Education: University of Manitoba
- Occupation: Businessman, real estate owner
- Profession: Politician

William John McKeag, CM OM CD (17 March 1928 – 23 August 2007) was a Manitoba politician and office-holder. He served as the province's 17th Lieutenant Governor between 1970 and 1976.

McKeag was born in Winnipeg, and was educated at the University of Manitoba. He served as general manager of Security Storage Limited (a family business) from 1952 until his appointment in 1970. He also established the McKeag-Harris Reality and Development company in 1960.

In 1958, McKeag ran for the Manitoba legislature as a Liberal-Progressive candidate in the upscale Winnipeg riding of River Heights. This was the year in which Dufferin Roblin's Progressive Conservatives ended forty-three years of Liberal and Progressive rule, and McKeag was defeated by Progressive Conservative candidate W.B. Scarth.

From 1966 to 1969, McKeag was a councillor in the town of Tuxedo, prior to its merger with Winnipeg. He was also chairman of the Greater Winnipeg Election Committee from 1968 to 1970.

McKeag, at the age of 42, was the youngest lieutenant governor in Manitoba's history when he was appointed by Prime Minister Pierre Elliott Trudeau in 1970. However, the office of lieutenant governor was a ceremonial post, and he had almost no practical influence over the government of Edward Schreyer.

McKeag was appointed Honorary Colonel of The Fort Garry Horse on 26 June 1973 and held the appointment until 22 January 2000.

McKeag was appointed to the Order of Canada in 1996, and the Order of Manitoba in 2000.

McKeag died on 23 August 2007 at the age of 79. He had three daughters and one son with his wife, Dawn, who is the daughter of former Premier Douglas Campbell.

== Arms ==
Coat of arms of William John McKeag
Crest Issuant from an ancient crown Or the gate of Fort Garry between two sprigs of heather Proper. Escutcheon Argent on a fess Gules between three trefoils Vert a buffalo's head caboshed and crowned between two oak sprigs fructed Or. Supporters Dexter a lion guardant Or and sinister a buffalo guardant Proper. Motto Melius Fortunatus Quam Callidus (Better Fortunate Than Clever) Badge Three horseshoes interlaced fesswise Or and by an undulating riband reflexed above to the sinister and below to the dexter per fess Gules and Argent.
