= Bandwagon with Bob Francis =

- Genre: Musical variety show
- Directed by: Barry Cranston
- Presented by: Bob Francis
- Country of origin: Canada
- Original language: English
- No. of seasons: 2

Production
- Producers: Aubrey Tadman; Garry Ferrier
- Running time: 30 minutes

Original release
- Network: CBC Television
- Release: September 21, 1972 – March 28, 1975

Bandwagon with Bob Francis is a Canadian musical variety television series that aired on the CBC between September 21, 1972 and June 21, 1973 then February 13 to March 28, 1975. The show was hosted by Bob Francis who presented big band music performances. Bob Francis sometimes performed as vocalist and trumpet] player Guido Basso also performed. Aubrey Tadman and Garry Ferrier produced and Barry Cranston directed.
