= The Bushbaby =

1969 film by John Trent

- Theatrical release poster
- Directed by: John Trent
- Written by: Robert Maxwell; William Stevenson
- Based on: The Bushbabies by William Stevenson
- Produced by: Robert Maxwell; John Trent
- Starring: Margaret Brooks; Louis Gossett
- Music by: Les Reed
- Production company: Metro-Goldwyn-Mayer
- Distributed by: Metro-Goldwyn-Mayer
- Release dates: September 1969 (UK); November 1970 (U.S.)
- Running time: 100 minutes
- Country: United States
- Languages: English; Swahili

The Bushbaby is a 1969 American children's adventure film based on the novel The Bushbabies (1965) by William Stevenson and adapted by Robert Maxwell. It was directed and produced by John Trent and stars Margaret Brooks and Lou Gossett in the leading roles, also starring Donald Houston and Laurence Naismith.

The film tells an episode in the life of Jackie Leeds, daughter of John Leeds. When the African country in which they reside, Kenya, declares its independence, John Leeds assumes that he has lost his job and must leave for London with his daughter. This proves difficult for Jackie, who is convinced that she belongs in Kenya, especially after their friend Tembo Murumbi presents her with a pet bushbaby that she names Komba, which she will have to return to its natural habitat prior to leaving.

The film was the first adaptation of the book The Bushbabies by William Stevenson. Decades later, in 1992, the story was adapted for television as an anime series belonging to the World Masterpiece Theater from Nippon Animation. The series received the international English title of The Bush Baby (大草原の小さな天使 ブッシュベイビー, Sougen no chiisana tenshi busshu beibii).

== Plot ==
One night in the Kenyan grasslands, Jackie Leeds and her family's native friend and servant, Tembo Murumbi, chase a young galago about its preferred habitat, a baobab tree. Tembo catches the small animal and offers it to Jackie as a gift; she names the small bushbaby Komba. A year or so passes since this first encounter, and one day at church, Komba's playfulness causes commotion, disrupting the daily hymn. Feeling defeated, the pastor Reverend Barlow yields the podium to Professor Crankshaw, who takes the opportunity to bid farewell to a number of church members. Jackie notices that Crankshaw, "Cranky" as she calls him, looks firmly into her father's eyes as he speaks, and she becomes alarmed. After church, Jackie's suspicions are confirmed when her father explains that, due to the new powers in Kenya's government, his employment as a game warden is likely to be terminated. They'll leave for London where he'll fill an opening at the zoo. Jackie is upset at the news, especially when she learns that Komba will have to be left behind. For Jackie, leaving Africa means leaving the home she's known all of her life: her school, her friends, and the grave of her mother, Penelope Leeds, who had been killed in the uprising of 1961.

== Cast ==
- Margaret Brooks as Jacqueline "Jackie" Leeds
- Louis Gossett as Tembo Murumbi
- Donald Houston as John Leeds
- Laurence Naismith as Professor "Cranky" Crankshaw
- Marne Maitland as Hadj
- Geoffrey Bayldon as Tilison
- Jack Gwillim as Ardsley
- Noel Howlett as Reverend Barlow
- Tommy Ansah as Policeman
- Jumoke Debayo as Bus Woman
- Harold Goodwin as Steward Bertie
- Charles Hyatt as Gideon
- Willie Johah as Police Sergeant
- Simon Lack as First Officer
- Victor Maddern as Barman
- Ellario Pedro as Policeman
- Martin Wyldeck as Captain
- Sid Hunt as Second Officer
- Mohinder Singh Matharoo as Sikh Policeman
- Johan Mkopi as Police Constable
- Kasesa Mayega as Elephant Poacher

== Home media ==
The Bushbaby was released on home video on 18 August 1993.

== See also ==
- List of American films of 1969
- William Stevenson
- The Bushbabies (1965)
- The Bush Baby (1992)
