= Juul Haalmeyer =

Dutch-Canadian costume designer (1949–2025)

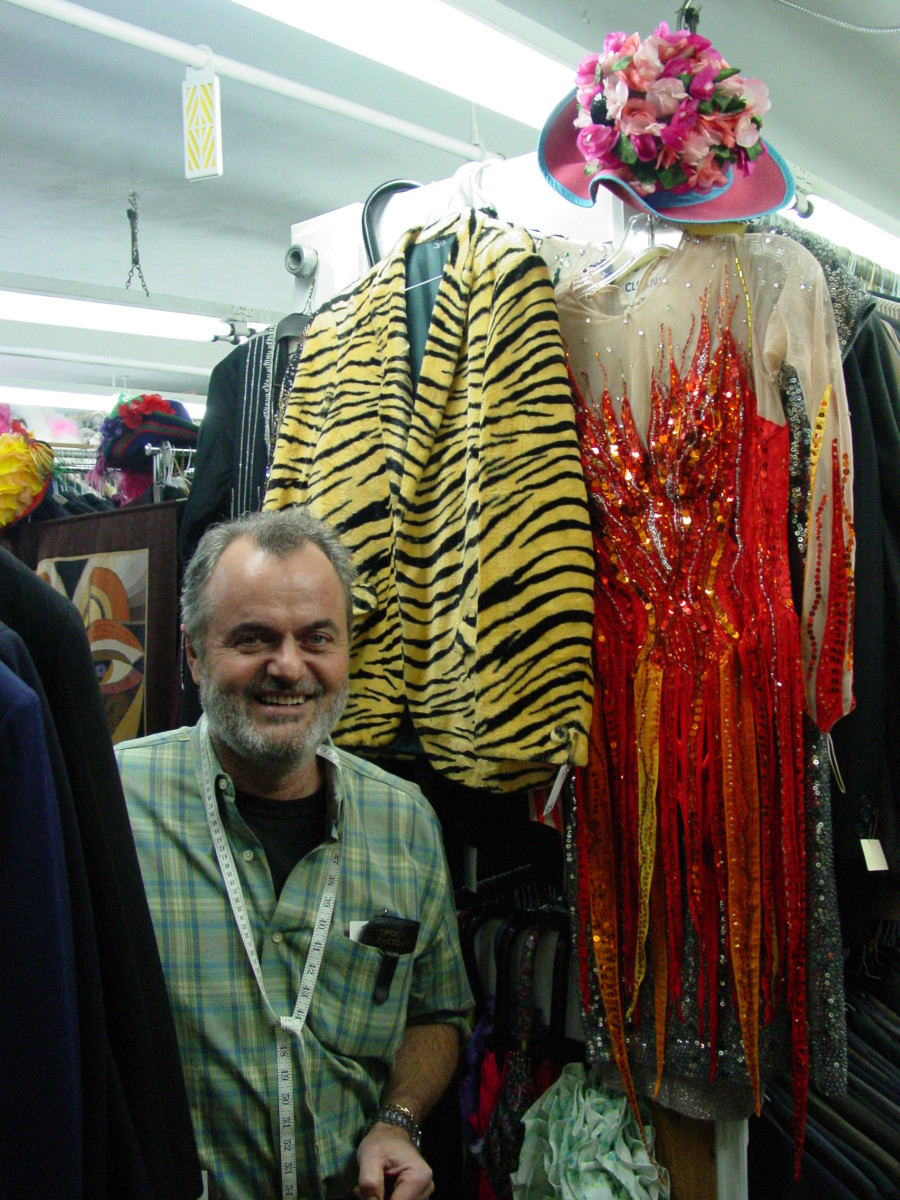
- Haalmeyer in 2002
- Born: Julius Anton Haalmeyer; May 17, 1949; Haarlem, Netherlands
- Died: February 28, 2025 (aged 75); Toronto, Ontario, Canada
- Citizenship: Canadian
- Years active: 1969–2025
- Known for: Costume designs on SCTV
- Awards: Emmy nomination

Julius Anton Haalmeyer (May 17, 1949 – February 28, 2025) was a Dutch-Canadian costume designer, best known for doing costume design on several iterations of SCTV. Haalmeyer also worked as a costume designer for many movies, television shows, theatre productions, concerts wardrobes for various artists and specials like Bridge to Silence, All My Sons, Long Day's Journey into Night, Noddy, the Shining Time Station Family Specials, Mr. Conductor's Thomas Tales, Diamonds, Andrea Martin: Together Again, and Ghostwriter.

== Early life and career ==
Juul Haalmeyer was born in Haarlem, Netherlands in 1949 and immigrated with his family to the United States in the late 1950s. He lived in California and Oregon with his family before coming to Vancouver, British Columbia at the age of 18, to avoid being drafted for the Vietnam War. He started his career as a costume designer in 1969, working on TV, movies, and theatre in Toronto.

== Personal life and death ==
Haalmeyer was the son of Albert Haalmeyer, an artist and Trudy (née Staats) Haalmeyer, a nurse. He had one sister and a brother. He died of cancer at the age of 75 on February 28, 2025, at a hospital in Toronto, Ontario.

== Juul Haalmeyer Dancers ==
The Juul Haalmeyer Dancers were a woefully inept troupe of variety show dancers on the television sketch comedy show SCTV. They premiered on series 4, cycle 1, episode 8, titled Bouncin' Back to You with The Tubes.

Catherine O'Hara wanted bad dancers for the Bouncin' Back to You segment with Lola Heatherton. O'Hara auditioned professional dancers, but they couldn't dance poorly, so she asked Haalmeyer, the show's costume designer, to put something together with whoever was available. O'Hara named the dance group The Juul Haalmeyer Dancers because it sounded similar to the June Taylor Dancers.

The dance group changed with each episode they appeared on, with Haalmeyer being the only constant. The dancers were made up of the show's cast members who weren't busy elsewhere, the show's writers, and miscellaneous crew members who were available.

All the dancers were dressed identically, with Haalmeyer creating the costumes. The choreography and dance routines were kept simple and jointly developed by the dancers. The signature exit move — fingers pointing down while backing up — was developed by Eugene Levy.

The character of "Juul Haalmeyer" was allowed to develop over the course of several episodes and was seen on occasion without the dance troupe. In his final appearance, he and SCTV character Lola Heatherton revealed that they were in a relationship.

=== Appearances ===
The Juul Haalmeyer Dancers only appeared on these six episodes of SCTV.

- Series 4, cycle 1, episode 8 — Bouncin' Back to You with The Tubes — (24 July 1981)
- Series 4, cycle 2, episode 1 — CCCP 1 with Al Jarreau — (16 October 1981)
- Series 4, cycle 2, episode 7 — SCTV Staff Christmas Party — (18 December 1981)
- Series 4, cycle 3, episode 3 — The People's Global Golden Choice Awards with Third World — (1 May 1982)
- Series 5, cycle 4, episode 4 — Jane Eyrehead with Robin Williams and America — (26 November 1982)
- Series 5, cycle 4, episode 6 — Christmas with Catherine O'Hara and Andrae Crouch — (17 December 1982)

Juul Haalmeyer also appeared as "himself" (i.e. in character, but without the dance troupe) in:

- Series 4, cycle 2, episode 3 — "Zontar with Bonar Bain and Natalie Cole" — (30 October 1981)
- Series 4, cycle 3, episode 1 — "The Great White North Palace with Tony Bennett" — (16 April 1982)

Haalmeyer can also be glimpsed as an extra in a handful of other episodes.

== Charity ==
Haalmeyer was active in charity work, donating costumes to groups such as the acrobatic/dance group Fantasy Flyers.

== Filmography ==
COSTUME DESIGN:

YEAR PRODUCER PRODUCTION / PERFORMER CATEGORY # Shows

1999-2000 IMG Skate The Nation with Brian Orser & International Champions Skating Tours
1998-99 PBX/BBC/TVO Noddy Children's Series (44 episodes) * Received EMMY Award for Costume Design Jayne Eastwood, Sean McCann
1994-95 CATALYST / PBS Shining Time Station Children's Special
1993-94 ALLIANCE / FAMILY Mighty Jungle Sitcom (22 episodes)
1993 TOUCHSTONE / DISNEY Cool Runnings, John Candy - Personal Assistant
1989-92 CBC / SALTER STREET FILMS Codco Comedy Series (47 episodes) - Cathy Jones, Greg Malone, Tommy Sexton, Mary Walsh
1990-91 BILL GRAHAM / IMG Skating I & II North American Tour with Brian Boitano / Katarina Witt
1991 McKENNA / GLOBAL / HA! Peeping Tom Comedy Pilot
1989 NORSTAR / SIMPSON / SAGAR Prom Night III – The Last Kiss Film
1989 CDN. CENTRE FOR ADVANCED FILM STUDIES Exposed Film - Co-designed with Sylvie Bonniere
1989 CBS / SHOWTIME Together Again Comedy Special with Andrea Martin
1989 CBS / WHITLEY / SHOWTIME Second City 15th Anniversary Comedy Special with SCTV & Second City Alumni
1988 FAR NORTH / FRIES / CBS Bridge to Silence Movie of the Week with Lee Remick, Marlee Matlin
1988 MALABAR / PITTSBURGH L.O. Annie Get Your Gun Stage Musical
1988 MALABAR / MUNI – ST. LOUIS Grease Stage Musical
1987-88 ALLIANCE / CBS Diamonds Drama Series (22 episodes)
1987 WHITLEY / H.B.O. The Enigma of Bobby Bittman Comedy Special with Eugene Levy
1987 CBC / ROTHMAN Rendezvous 87 Variety Special
1987 CINEMAX Max Campaign Commercials
1986 BRANDMAN / WHITLEY / UNIVERSAL Long Day's Journey Into Night Drama Special with Jack Lemmon / (Key to Willa Kim)
1986 BRANDMAN/WHITLEY/UNIVERSAL/PBS/G.W. All My Sons Drama Special with Aidan Quinn / Michael Learned / James Whitmore
1986 SHOWMAKERS Hollywood Then & Now Stage Productions
1985 SHOWTIME / INTERCHANGE The Incredible Time Travels of Henry Osgood * Winner of A.C.E. Award for Costume Design Comedy Special – Film
1985 SHOWTIME / CBC The Martin Short Comedy Special Comedy Special with SCTV Cast & Christopher Guest
1985 TAFFNER / CTV / G.W. Check It Out Sitcom (start-up)
1985 SHOWMAKERS Young & Alive Stage Production
1980-85 SHOWMAKERS Mary Kay Industrials
1984 ALNDON / CBC Claus Mission Christmas Special
1984 SHOWMAKERS Ontario Bicentennial Tour Stage Production
1984 CANDY / HBO / WHITLEY The Last Polka Comedy Special with John Candy and Eugene Levy
1981-84 OLD FIREHALL / NBC / CINEMAX S.C.T.V. Comedy Series with John Candy / Joe Flaherty / Eugene Levy / Andrea Martin / Rick Moranis / Catherine O’Hara / Martin Short / Dave Thomas
1978-84 BALMUR / CBS / CBC Anne Murray Concert Wardrobe
1980 ESSEX / CBS Castle Rock Drama Special
1980 VALENTINE / TWP Valentine Brown Stage Production * Nominated for Dora Mayor Award for Costume Design
1980 OSMONDS / CTV Big City Comedy Comedy Series (12 episodes) with John Candy
1980 CBC Mr. Smith Goes To The Movies Variety Special
1980 SALOME BEY ENTERTAINMENT Indigo Cabaret
1980 ANDROCLES Dinah Christie & Friends Cabaret
1979 OECA Read All About It Children's Series (22 episodes)
1979 CJOH / CTV The Magic Show Variety Special
1979 CJOH / CTV Beauty & The Beast Ballet
1979 WOLF RISSMILLER Jethro Tull – Storm Watch World Tour
1976-78 CHAMPLAIN / CTV The Julie Show Variety Series (44 episodes)
1976-78 CHAMPLAIN / CTV Loto Canada Variety Specials (10 episodes)
1977 DISTORTED REFLECTIONS Dolly Parton Concert Wardrobe (with Patrick Reeves-Aaron)
1976 CBC / HARTLEY The Shari Lewis Special Variety Special
1976 CTV / GLENWARREN The David Steinberg Show Comedy Series (22 episodes)
1976 CTV / BLYE / GLENWARREN The Bobby Vinton Show Variety Series (24 episodes)
1975 HALLMARK / CBS / G.W. Valley Forge Drama Special (Key to Anne Roth)
1975 ABC / CTV Welcome To My Nightmare Variety Special with Alice Cooper
1975 CHAMPLAIN / CTV Kidstuff Children's Series (44 episodes)
1975 OECA Portrait Of The Novel Drama Anthology (6 episodes)
1975 OECA Monkey Bars Children's Series (12 episodes)
1974 NBC / CTV / G.W. Razzle Dazzle Variety Series (12 episodes) (Key to Ret Turner)
1974 ABC / CTV Salem Village Movie of the Week
1973 HALLMARK / FOX The Borrowers Children's Special * Nominated for an EMMY Award, Costume Design with Eddie Albert, Tammy Grimes, Dame Judith Anderson
1973 CTV / WESTINGHOUSE Norman Corwin Presents Anthology Drama Series (22 episodes)
1973 JAN KADAR / PBS The Blue Hotel Film Drama Special
1973 ABC / CTV / G.W. Jack Lemmon – George Gershwin Variety Special (Key to Theoni Aldredge)
1971 ABC / CTV / G.W. Rollin’ On the River Variety Series (32 episodes) with Kenny Rogers & The First Edition (Key to Aleida MacDonald)
1971-74 CTV The Pig & Whistle Variety Series (66 episodes)
1971 NBC / CTV / ROTHMAN / G.W. ½ The George Kirby Comedy Hour Variety Series (18 episodes)
1969-70 MALABAR COSTUMES LTD. International Operas and Musicals Coordinated 200+ productions
1969–present NUMEROUS COMMERCIALS AND INDUSTRIALS
1971–present VARIOUS ARTISTS & SKATERS Performance & Competition Wardrobe & Commercials
