= The Bushbabies =

1965 novel by William Stevenson

- Cover of The Bushbabies
- Author: William Stevenson
- Illustrator: Victor Ambrus
- Language: English
- Genre: Children's novel
- Publisher: Houghton Mifflin Co.
- Publication date: 1965
- Publication place: Written in Canada, published in the United States
- Media type: Print (hardcover)
- Pages: 278 pp (first edition)
- OCLC: 230064
- LC Class: PZ7.S84853 Bu FT MEADE

The Bushbabies is a children's novel by Canadian author William Stevenson published in 1965. The book was inspired by Stevenson's own life in Kenya, where his daughter Jackie, to whom the book is dedicated, kept a bushbaby named Kamau as a pet. The fictional aspects of the novel involve Jacqueline "Jackie" Rhodes and her father's African servant Tembo escaping across the wilderness from a pack of man-hunters who have been led to believe that Tembo has kidnapped Jackie. The book features illustrations by Victor Ambrus.

The novel has had two major adaptations, a 1969 theatrical motion picture from MGM and a 1992 animated series from Japan's Nippon Animation.

== Plot summary ==
Jackie Rhodes is the daughter of a respected gamekeeper, known as "Trapper" Rhodes, in Kenya. She has lived there all of her life, so she is astounded and saddened when she learns from Tembo, her father's African servant, that her family will soon be abandoning the continent. Her biggest concern immediately becomes her pet bushbaby Kamau, which had been a Christmas gift from her father; she fears the creature is too young to fend for itself and will perish if left behind. During a family picnic, Trapper Rhodes comforts Jackie by assuring her that he'll obtain an official export permit that will allow her to take the bushbaby along.

Kamau preys upon a mantis for its supper, as illustrated by Victor Ambrus.

When the time comes for their departure, Jackie realizes that she has lost the export permit and grows very concerned. She learns from a steward that the ship's captain is not fond of animals, which makes matters worse. She realizes she cannot possibly hide Kamau as a stowaway or face export officials upon arrival. As her family sleeps, she abandons the ship hoping to set Kamau loose in the docks of Mombasa. Thoughts of the bushbaby's many natural predators immediately make Jackie have a change of heart and decide that Kamau must be returned to his natural habitat if he's to have a chance at survival. Jackie is horror-stricken when she realizes the ship has set sail leaving her and Kamau behind. She is comforted by the sound of a harmonica, realizing that it is being played by Tembo. She explains the situation to him and asks for his help. The African, moved by his loyalty to the Rhodes and a desire to be of service, unenthusiastically agrees to do so.

The trio head by bus and foot towards the village of Vipingo. At her father's cottage Jackie and Tembo plan their next move while becoming increasingly acquainted with one another, which soothes the girl's fears. Meanwhile, Kamau encounters a praying mantis and Jackie observes the bushbaby's hunting abilities, growing less concerned about its ability to survive on its own. Unfortunately, the area is affected by a drought and an unexpected encounter with a rat snake foreshadows the dangers that they'll face in their journey. Jackie, who had hoped to be helped by Major Bob, a friend of the family, is astounded to learn that he's abandoned his home. When she approaches the Vipingo post office, she overhears the Hadj speaking to a gathering of villagers. He shows them the police's official order for the arrest of the black man who is believed to have kidnapped the white Rhodes girl. Horror-stricken, Jackie returns to Tembo and tells him that they must leave the place immediately.

Back aboard the ship, Jackie's family discover her absence and request that the ship be turned around, a suggestion that coincides with Captain MacRae's plans to avoid a threatening sea storm brewing in the Indian Ocean.

A prolonged drought is upsetting the many animals of the African savanahs as they follow the trails of the elephants in search of water. This complicates Tembo and Jackie's journey across the grasslands as they face dangerous creatures. The most dangerous encounter, however, is with an elephant poacher sent out to kill Tembo. Tembo manages to wrestle the man and send him running, but not before one of his poisoned arrowheads strikes Jackie's upper arm.

== Characters ==
Jackie Rhodes - A thirteen-year-old girl and the protagonist in the novel. She is physically described as having corn blond hair and blue eyes, a slightly crooked nose and a wide mouth, as well as thin legs too long for her age. She is tomboyish and awkward; her foolish choices stir a great deal of trouble which are the core of the novel.

Tembo Murumbi - Trapper Rhodes' servant, assistant and close family friend. He is left behind when the family leaves Kenya and meets Jackie after she abandons the ship. Moved by a close friendship and sense of duty, he willingly agrees to help Jackie in her journey to return Kamau to his natural habitat. Sadly, news spread out that he has kidnapped Jackie and the African officials soon put a prize on his head, with orders to shoot him on sight.

== Adaptations ==
=== Feature film ===
The novel was adapted into a major motion picture from Metro Goldwyn Mayer in 1969 entitled The Bushbaby. The film was produced and directed by John Trent and featured young Margaret Brooks in the role of Jackie Leeds and Lou Gossett, Jr. as Tembo. The film was not very well received and suffered the same fate as the novel; after a 1993 VHS release from MGM/UA, it was never again re-released in any part of the globe. The novel was re-published in paperback following the theatrical release of this picture, retitled The Bushbaby and featuring an image of Brooks as Jackie on the cover.

=== Animated series ===
Jackie Rhodes and "Murphy" as they appeared in the Japanese animated series.

The most popular adaptation of the novel was an anime series from Nippon Animation, Bushbaby, Little Angel of the Grasslands (大草原の小さな天使 ブッシュベイビー, Daisougen no Chiisana Tenshi Busshubeibī), the studio's 1992 installment of its World Masterpiece Theater showcase. The 40-episode series was directed by Takayoshi Suzuki and written by Akira Miyazaki. Though the series' recognition falls short when compared to other works of its kind (Anne of Green Gables, 1979 or Little Women, 1987), it remains the most known version of the story, surpassing both Stevenson's novel and the MGM film significantly. The series has been popular in its native Japan and has been dubbed into several languages and shown in their respective countries, among them Spain (Jackie y su mascota), Arabic (زهرة البراري), Italy (Le voci della savana), Germany (Buschbabies: Im Land des wilden Tiere) and France (Jackie dans la savane). An English dub of the series was produced for broadcast in Canada. Unlike the other works, the series is available for purchase on a DVD collection in Japan.

== See also ==
- William Stevenson
- Victor Ambrus
- The Bushbaby (1969)
- The Bushbaby, Little Angel of the Grasslands (1992)
