= Peter Carter (director) =

British-Canadian director, producer (1933–1982)

Peter Carter (December 8, 1933 - June 3, 1982) was a British-Canadian film and television director. Best known as the director of The Rowdyman and Klondike Fever, he garnered a Genie Award nomination for Best Director at the 1st Genie Awards in 1980 for Klondike Fever.

Carter began as an apprentice with J. Arthur Rank in England and moved to Canada in 1955, where he joined Crawley Films as an editor and assistant director. He returned to England, worked in Africa, and came back to Canada in 1963. His films included Rituals, High-Ballin' and Highpoint and on television, his credits included episodes of R.C.M.P., Seaway, Wojeck, McQueen, For the Record, Police Surgeon, The Forest Rangers and Swiss Family Robinson, and the telefilms The Courage of Kavik the Wolf Dog and A Man Called Intrepid. He died of a heart attack on June 3, 1982. He was married to actress Linda Goranson.
