= The Clown Murders =

- Theatrical release poster
- Directed by: Martyn Burke
- Written by: Martyn Burke
- Produced by: Christopher Dalton, Stephen Stohn
- Starring: Stephen Young; Lawrence Dane; John Candy; Cec Linder
- Cinematography: Dennis Miller
- Music by: John Mills-Cockell
- Production company: Magnum Films
- Distributed by: Astral Films
- Release date: September 1976
- Running time: 96 minutes
- Country: Canada
- Language: English
- Budget: CAD $135,000

The Clown Murders is a 1976 Canadian horror film directed by Martyn Burke. It was one of the earliest films in which John Candy appears. The executive producer was Stephen Stohn, who later produced the Degrassi: The Next Generation TV series.

== Plot ==
Four friends hatch a scheme to dress up like clowns on Halloween and kidnap a businessman's wife to prevent him from closing a land deal. Though the scheme is intended as a prank, it takes an ugly turn when real violence is used at the kidnapping. As the kidnappers deal with the fallout from their actions, it becomes apparent that an outside party (also in a clown costume) is stalking them.

== Cast ==
- Stephen Young as Charlie
- Susan Keller as Alison
- Lawrence Dane as Philip
- John Candy as Ollie
- Gary Reineke as Rosie
- John Bayliss as Peter
- Al Waxman as Police Sergeant
- William Osler as Harrison
- Philip Craig as Tom

== Release ==
The film was released by Astral Films in its native Canada in September 1976.

=== Home media ===
In the United States, in 1985 the film was released on VHS and Betamax by Trans World Entertainment, with John Candy receiving first billing on the cover, and his photo appearing on the back cover, despite his small role in the film. It was also released on DVD on July 12, 2007 by Image Entertainment under license from Cinevision International.

== Reception ==
Kurt Dahlke from DVD Talk gave the film 2.5 out of 5 stars, writing, "The Clown Murders is almost worth a rent for Canadian Cinema scholars or rabid fans of '70s sleazo-crime dramas in this incarnation, but it stinks so much as is that it's really hard to go out on that limb." Todd Martin from HorrorNews.net gave the film a negative review, calling it "mind-numbingly boring" and also criticized the film's lack of scares. Terror Trap awarded the film 1 out of 4 stars, stating that the film "doesn't have the requisite firepower - either in terms of its writing, or its ability to generate dramatic tension - to make for a worthwhile watch."

== See also ==
- List of films set around Halloween

== Bibliography ==
- Vatnsdal, Caelum (2004). They Came From Within : A History of Canadian Horror Cinema. Arbeiter Ring Publishing. ISBN 1-894037-21-9.
