= It Seemed Like a Good Idea at the Time =

- Movie cover
- Directed by: John Trent
- Screenplay by: David Main; John Trent
- Story by: Claude Harz; John Trent
- Produced by: David Perlmutter
- Starring: Anthony Newley; Stefanie Powers; Isaac Hayes; Lloyd Bochner; Yvonne De Carlo
- Cinematography: Harry Makin
- Edited by: Tony Lower
- Music by: William McCauley
- Distributed by: Gemstone Entertainment
- Release date: September 11, 1975
- Running time: 90 minutes
- Country: Canada
- Language: English

It Seemed Like a Good Idea at the Time is a Canadian comedy film, directed by John Trent and released in 1975. One of John Candy's earliest films, he plays the minor role of investigating police officer Kopek. However, for marketing/publicity reasons, Candy appears on the cover of the DVD release. Candy and Lawrence Dane's characters Kopek and Broom eventually spun off their own film, Find the Lady.

== Plot ==
Sweeney is a playwright on a career decline. He spends much of his time wheedling money and beer out of his artistic friend Moriarty. One of his few highlights is weekly sex with his ex-wife Georgina. She is remarried to rich but vile construction developer Prince, but Sweeney and Georgina are still in love. Sweeney's escapades end with a fake kidnapping scam. This gets the attention of inept police officers Broom and Kopek. These two end up dressed as garbage men in the chase scene finale and everything winds up with a happy ending.

== Cast ==
- Anthony Newley as Sweeney
- Stefanie Powers as Georgina
- Isaac Hayes as Moriarty
- Lloyd Bochner as Burton
- Yvonne De Carlo as Julia
- Henry Ramer as Prince
- Lawrence Dane as Broom
- John Candy as Kopek
- Robert A. Silverman as Lawyer
- Anne Marie Sten as Big Red, as Anne-Marie Sten
