= Highpoint (film) =

- Theatrical release poster
- Directed by: Peter Carter
- Written by: Richard Guttman; Ian Sutherland
- Produced by: Daniel M. Fine
- Starring: Richard Harris; Christopher Plummer; Beverly D'Angelo
- Cinematography: Albert J. Dunk
- Edited by: Eric Wrate; Annette Tilden; Barry Zetlin; William Kowalchuk
- Music by: John Addison (European cut); Christopher Young (North American cut)
- Distributed by: New World Pictures (US)
- Release dates: August 20, 1982 (Europe); August 31, 1984 (North America)
- Running time: 86 minutes
- Country: Canada
- Language: English

Highpoint is a Canadian 1982 action comedy-thriller film directed by Peter Carter and starring Richard Harris, Christopher Plummer and Beverly D'Angelo.

The film was shot on location in Montreal and Toronto, and is perhaps best remembered for its climax atop the CN Tower, in which stuntman Dar Robinson (doubling for Plummer) makes the 700 ft (210 m) jump in freefall, protected only by a hidden parachute.

The film underwent a lengthy and troubled post-production period. Originally filmed in 1979 as a comedic thriller in the vein of North by Northwest, the film was shelved for two years during which extensive reshoots took place. The film was given a limited release in Europe in 1982. Due to negative critical and audience reception concerning its convoluted plot and poor pacing, the film was heavily re-edited by North American distributor New World Pictures, removing much of the comedy and replacing John Addison's original score with one by Christopher Young. This version was released in theaters in 1984, and provided the basis for future home video releases.

== Plot ==
Lewis Kinney is an accountant who goes to work for a wealthy family, the Hatchers. James Hatcher has embezzled $10 million from the mafia and the CIA, and now they are both seeking him. Kinney falls for James' sister Lise and is pursued by two bumbling henchmen, Centino and Falco. He eventually outwits them.

== Cast ==
- Richard Harris as Lewis Kinney
- Christopher Plummer as James Hatcher
- Beverly D'Angelo as Lise Hatcher
- Kate Reid as Mrs. Hatcher
- Peter Donat as Maronzella
- Robin Gammell as Banner
- Saul Rubinek as Centino
- Maury Chaykin as Falco
- George Buza as Alex

== Production ==
The film was based on a script by Richard Guttman, who was a partner in a Hollywood public relations film. It was originally to star Richard Harris and Katherine Ross. Ross was replaced by Beverly D'Angelo.

Filming started 30 July 1979. The film was financed by Canadian money, raised under tax concessions which led to the Canadian film boom at the time.

The film was reportedly so bad that another $2 million was spent on re-editing.

== Proposed Follow Up ==
Harris and Plummer were to appear in another Canadian film, The Burning Book but only $3 million of the $7 million budget could be raised.
