= John Candy =

Canadian actor and comedian (1950–1994)

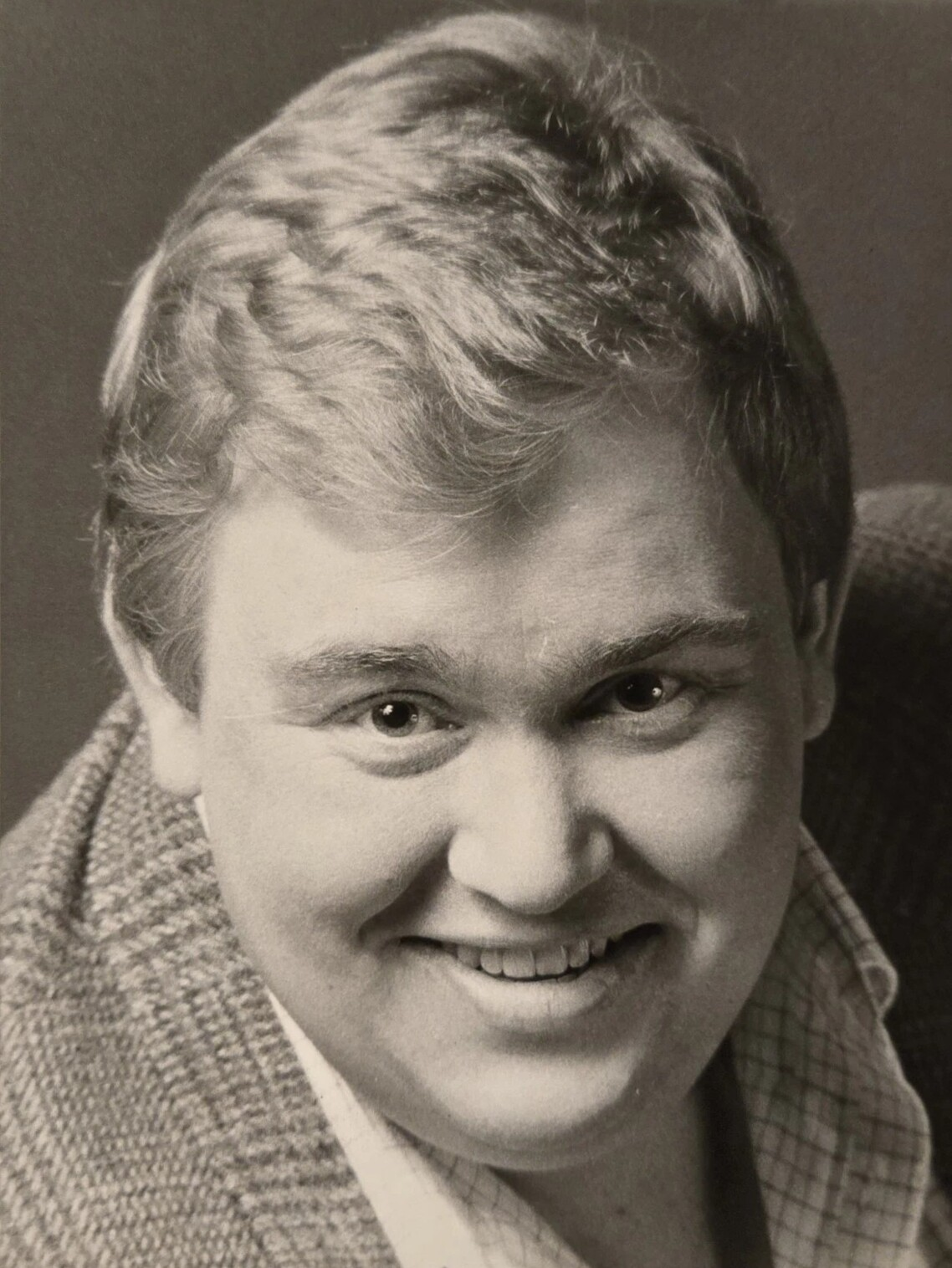
- Candy in 1982
- Born: John Franklin Candy; October 31, 1950; Newmarket, Ontario, Canada
- Died: March 4, 1994 (aged 43); Durango, Mexico
- Resting place: Holy Cross Cemetery; Culver City, California, U.S.
- Occupations: Actor; comedian
- Years active: 1971–1994
- Spouse: Rosemary Hobor (m. 1979)
- Children: 2

John Franklin Candy (October 31, 1950 – March 4, 1994) was a Canadian actor and comedian best known for his work in Hollywood comedy films.

Candy first rose to prominence in Canada during the 1970s as a member of the Toronto branch of The Second City and its sketch comedy series Second City Television. He achieved international fame in the 1980s with starring roles in comedy films, such as: Stripes (1981), Splash (1984), Brewster's Millions (1985), Summer Rental (1985), Armed and Dangerous (1986), Spaceballs (1987), Planes, Trains and Automobiles (1987), The Great Outdoors (1988), Uncle Buck (1989), Who's Harry Crumb? (1989) and Cool Runnings (1993).

Candy also had supporting roles in comedy films, such as: The Blues Brothers (1980), National Lampoon's Vacation (1983), Little Shop of Horrors (1986), Home Alone (1990), Nothing but Trouble (1991) and Rookie of the Year (1993). He co-owned the CFL's Toronto Argonauts, who won the 1991 Grey Cup under his ownership. Candy died of a heart attack in 1994, at age 43, while filming Wagons East (1994); it and the already completed Canadian Bacon (1995) were released posthumously and dedicated to his memory.

== Early life ==
Candy was born in Newmarket, Ontario, the youngest of two sons of Evangeline Valeria (née Aker; 1916–2009) and Sidney James Candy (1920–1955), a World War II veteran. His paternal grandparents were English immigrants who had moved to Canada in 1913, while his mother had Polish and Ukrainian ancestry. Candy was raised in a working class Catholic family in Toronto, where his childhood home was at 217 Woodville Avenue. On October 31, 1955—Candy's fifth birthday—his father died from complications of heart disease at age 35.

Candy attended Neil McNeil Catholic High School, where he was the treasurer of the student council, a star offensive tackle on the football team, and a member of the drama club. Before considering acting, Candy dreamed of becoming a professional football player, which he was forced to abandon after a career ending knee injury in high school. During this time, Candy also worked as a sales associate in Toronto's flagship department store Eaton's. He later studied journalism at Centennial College before joining McMaster University in Hamilton, Ontario.

== Career ==
=== 1971–1978: Early career and SCTV ===
In 1971, Candy was cast in a small part as a Shriner in Creeps by David E. Freeman, a new Canadian play about cerebral palsy, in the inaugural season of the Tarragon Theatre in Toronto. Candy guest-starred on a Canadian children's television series, Cucumber, and made a brief, uncredited appearance in Class of '44 (1973) as his feature film debut. He had a small part in The ABC Afternoon Playbreak ("Last Bride of Salem") and had a regular role on the TV series Dr. Zonk and the Zunkins (1974–75). Candy played the role of Wally Wypyzypywchuk in the CBC children's show Coming Up Rosie (1975).

Candy became a member of Toronto's branch of The Second City in 1972. He gained wide North American popularity when he became a cast member on the influential Toronto-based comedy-variety show Second City Television (SCTV). NBC picked the show up in 1981 and it quickly became a fan favourite. The show won Emmy Awards for its writing in 1981 and 1982. Among Candy's SCTV characters were unscrupulous street-beat TV personality Johnny LaRue, 3-D horror auteur Doctor Tongue, sycophantic and easily amused talk-show sidekick William B. Williams, and Melonville's corrupt Mayor Tommy Shanks.

In 1974, Candy made his TV debut when he appeared on the Canadian TV show Police Surgeon, playing street gang and heist member Ramone in "Target: Ms. Blue", and in a later episode the same season as Richie, an accused killer, in the episode "Web of Guilt". He was in It Seemed Like a Good Idea at the Time (1975), shot in Canada, as well as the children's sitcom Coming Up Rosie (1975–78) with Dan Aykroyd. Candy had a small role in Tunnel Vision (1976).

During the series's run, Candy appeared in films such as The Clown Murders (1976) and had a lead in a low-budget comedy, Find the Lady (1976) (both co-starring fellow Canadian actor Lawrence Dane). In 1976, he played a supporting role (with Rick Moranis) on Peter Gzowski's short-lived late-night television talk show 90 Minutes Live. Two years later, Candy had a small role as a bank employee (with Christopher Plummer and Elliott Gould) in the Canadian thriller The Silent Partner. He guest starred on such shows as The David Steinberg Show and King of Kensington.

=== 1979–1987: Hollywood breakthrough ===
In 1979, Candy took a brief hiatus from SCTV, which moved to Edmonton for a time. He stayed in Toronto and headlined his own short-lived sketch show Big City Comedy. Candy also began a more active film career, appearing in a minor role in Lost and Found (1979) and playing a U.S. Army soldier in Steven Spielberg's big-budget comedy 1941. He returned to Canada for roles in The Courage of Kavik, the Wolf Dog (1980) and the action thriller Double Negative (1980). Candy had a supporting role as easygoing parole officer Burton Mercer in The Blues Brothers (1980), and did an episode of Tales of the Klondike (1981) for Canadian TV.

In 1980, Candy hosted a short-lived NBC television program, Roadshow, described by The Washington Post as "improvisational journalism".

Candy played the lovable, mild-mannered Army recruit Dewey Oxberger in Stripes (1981), directed by Canadian Ivan Reitman, which was one of the most successful films of the year. He provided voices for multiple characters in the animated film Heavy Metal (1981), most notably as the title character in the "Den" segment, which was well-received, including by the character's creator, Richard Corben, who singled out Candy's humorously lighthearted interpretation of the title character as excellent.

From 1981 to 1983, Candy returned to SCTV Network on television. Still based in Edmonton for Candy's first few episodes after returning, the show returned to Toronto in 1982. He made a cameo appearance in Harold Ramis' National Lampoon's Vacation (1983), his first collaboration with John Hughes, who wrote the script. Candy appeared on Saturday Night Live twice (hosting in 1983) while still appearing on SCTV. According to writer-comedian Bob Odenkirk, Candy was reputedly the "most-burned potential host" of SNL, in that he was asked to host many times, only for plans to be changed by the SNL staff at the last minute. Candy headlined in the Canadian film Going Berserk (1983).

Candy once again left SCTV in 1983, prior to its final season, to concentrate on his film career. Candy was approached to play the character of accountant Louis Tully in Ghostbusters (1984), starring Aykroyd and directed by Reitman, but ultimately did not get the role because of his conflicting ideas of how to play the character; the part went instead to SCTV colleague Rick Moranis, whose ideas were better received. However, Candy did make a contribution to the franchise, as one of the many people chanting "Ghostbusters" in the video for Ray Parker Jr.'s hit single for the film.

Candy played Tom Hanks's womanizing brother in the hit romantic comedy Splash, generally considered his break-out role. After the success of the film, Candy had signed a three-picture development and producing deal with Walt Disney Pictures, and he would develop and executive produce various theatricals as planned starring vehicles for himself.

Candy went back to Canada to star in The Last Polka (1985), which he also wrote with co-star Eugene Levy. Candy was Richard Pryor's best friend in Brewster's Millions (1985) and had a cameo in the Sesame Street film Follow That Bird (1985). Candy's first lead role in a Hollywood film came with Summer Rental (1985), directed by Carl Reiner. Candy was reunited with Hanks in Volunteers (1985), though the film did not do as well as Splash. He had a cameo in The Canadian Conspiracy (1985) and appeared alongside Martin Short in Dave Thomas: The Incredible Time Travels of Henry Osgood (1985) in Canada. Candy's next starring role in a Hollywood film was the box office disappointment Armed and Dangerous (1986) with Levy and Meg Ryan. He had a cameo in Little Shop of Horrors (1986) and appeared in Really Weird Tales (1987). Candy also had a supporting role in Mel Brooks's Spaceballs (1987).

=== 1987–1994: John Hughes films and final roles ===
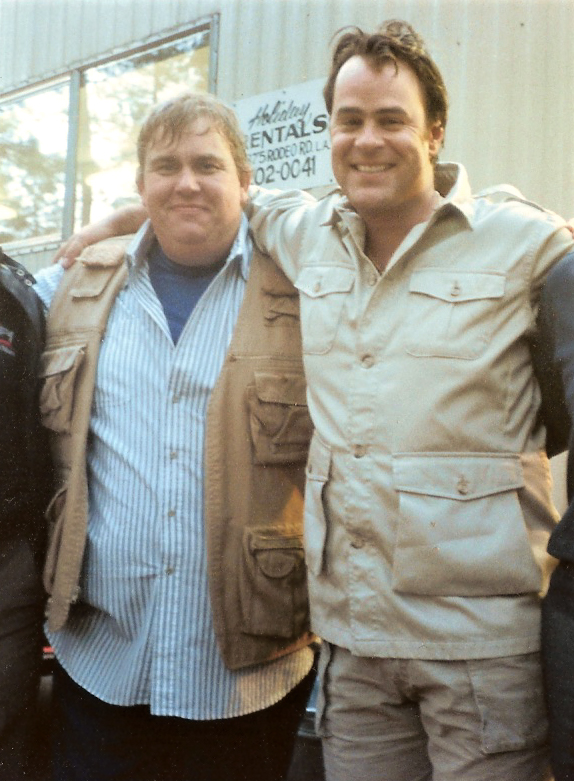
Candy with Dan Aykroyd in 1987

In 1987, Candy co-starred in Planes, Trains & Automobiles with Steve Martin, written and directed by John Hughes. The film had positive reviews and grossed $49,530,280 at the US box office. Candy appeared in a cameo role in Hughes's She's Having a Baby (1988) and then starred in a film written by Hughes, The Great Outdoors (1988) which co-starred Aykroyd.

Candy provided the voice for Don the Horse in Hot to Trot (1988) and starred in a flop comedy, considered by some to be a cult classic, Who's Harry Crumb? (1989), which he also produced. He was also in the box office flop Speed Zone aka Cannonball Fever (1989), but had another hit film with Hughes as writer and director in Uncle Buck (1989). Candy also produced and starred in a Saturday-morning animated series on NBC titled Camp Candy in 1989. The show was set in a fictional summer camp run by Candy, featuring his two children in supporting roles, and also spawned a brief comic book series published by Marvel Comics' Star Comics imprint. During this time, Candy also made the television film The Rocket Boy (1989) in Canada.

Candy also provided the voice of Wilbur the Albatross in Disney's animated film The Rescuers Down Under (1990) and had cameos in two more films written by Hughes, the blockbuster hit film Home Alone (1990) and the box office flop Career Opportunities (1991). According to Candy's biography, he was in talks to play Bette Midler's working-class husband in the 1990 film Stella. However, when Candy was informed that Midler demanded he do a screen test, Candy was furious proclaiming "Who the (expletive) does she think she is?!" and declined. John Goodman was eventually cast in the role. From 1988 to 1990, Candy hosted "Radio Kandy", a hot adult contemporary radio music countdown syndicated by Premiere Networks.

In 1991, Chris Columbus wrote and directed Only the Lonely with John Hughes serving as co-producer, and starring Candy and Maureen O'Hara; it was well reviewed but not a big hit. Candy also had a supporting role in Nothing But Trouble (1991), Dan Aykroyd's notorious box office flop. Also unsuccessful were the comedies Delirious (1991) and Once Upon a Crime... (1992). During this time, Candy played a small dramatic role as Dean Andrews Jr., a shady Southern lawyer in Oliver Stone's JFK (1991), and had a cameo in the television film Boris and Natasha: The Movie (1992). Candy starred in his first comedic hit in a number of years with Cool Runnings (1993), a story of the first Jamaican national bobsleigh team attempting to win the gold medal at the 1988 Winter Olympics. Candy also had an uncredited cameo as a sports broadcaster in the successful Rookie of the Year (1993). He made his directorial debut in the 1994 comedy television film Hostage for a Day. His last appearances were in Wagons East (1994) and Canadian Bacon (1995).

=== Unfinished projects ===
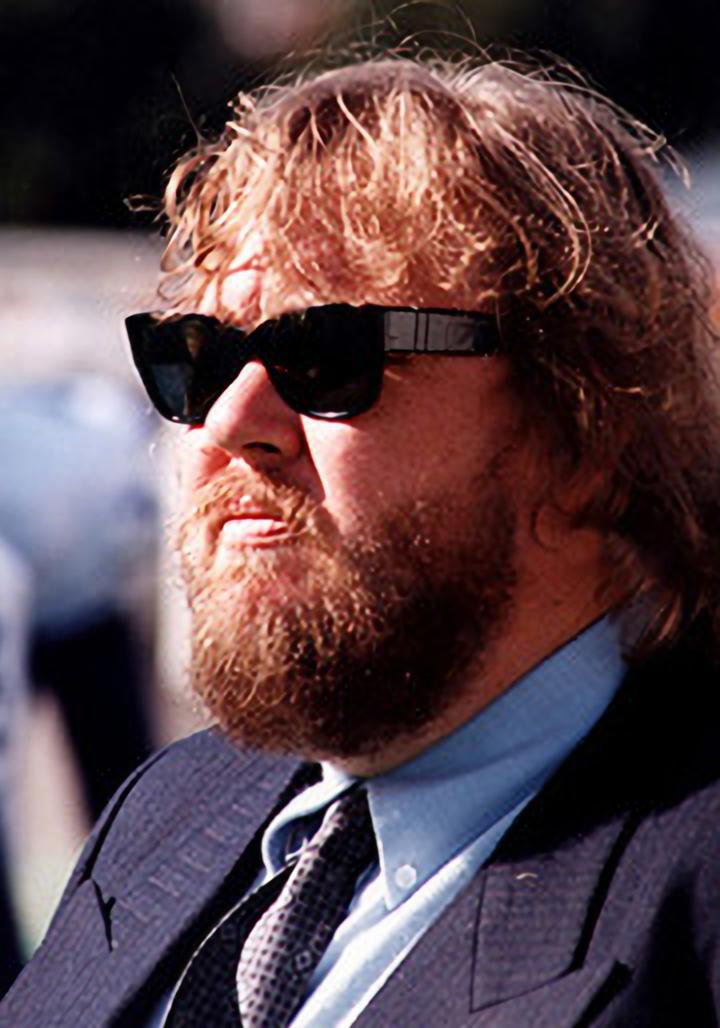
Candy in 1993

Candy was in talks to portray Ignatius J. Reilly in a now-shelved film adaptation of John Kennedy Toole's Pulitzer Prize–winning novel A Confederacy of Dunces. He had also expressed interest in portraying Atuk in a film adaptation of Mordecai Richler's The Incomparable Atuk and Roscoe "Fatty" Arbuckle in a biopic based on the silent film comedian's life. These three shelved projects have been alleged as cursed because Candy, John Belushi, Sam Kinison, and Chris Farley were each attached to all three films; they all died before they could make any of these movies. Candy was originally considered to play Alec Guinness' role in the remake of the 1950 film Last Holiday, with Carl Reiner directing. Eventually, the role was played by Queen Latifah in a loose remake released in 2006. Candy was also slated to collaborate with John Hughes again in a comedy opposite Sylvester Stallone, titled Bartholomew vs. Neff. Candy and Stallone were to have portrayed feuding neighbors. In the animated Disney film Pocahontas, the role of Redfeather the Turkey was written for him, but was subsequently cut from the film after his death. Stephen King reportedly wanted Candy to portray Billy Halleck in the film adaptation of his novel Thinner.

== Other ventures ==
In 1991, Candy, Bruce McNall, and Wayne Gretzky became co-owners of the Canadian Football League's Toronto Argonauts, of whom Candy was a lifelong fan. The celebrity ownership group attracted attention in Canada and the team spent a significant amount of money, even signing some highly touted National Football League prospects such as Raghib Ismail. The Argonauts took home the 1991 Grey Cup, beating Calgary 36–21 in the final. McNall's name was the only one originally etched onto the Grey Cup trophy as an owner of the team, with Candy's and Gretzky's names finally added to the trophy in 2007.

== Personal life ==
Candy married Rosemary Hobor in 1979. They had two children together and lived in the Brentwood neighborhood of Los Angeles for many years.

=== Religion ===
Candy was a Catholic.

=== Health ===
He was open about his experiences with severe anxiety and panic attacks.

== Death ==
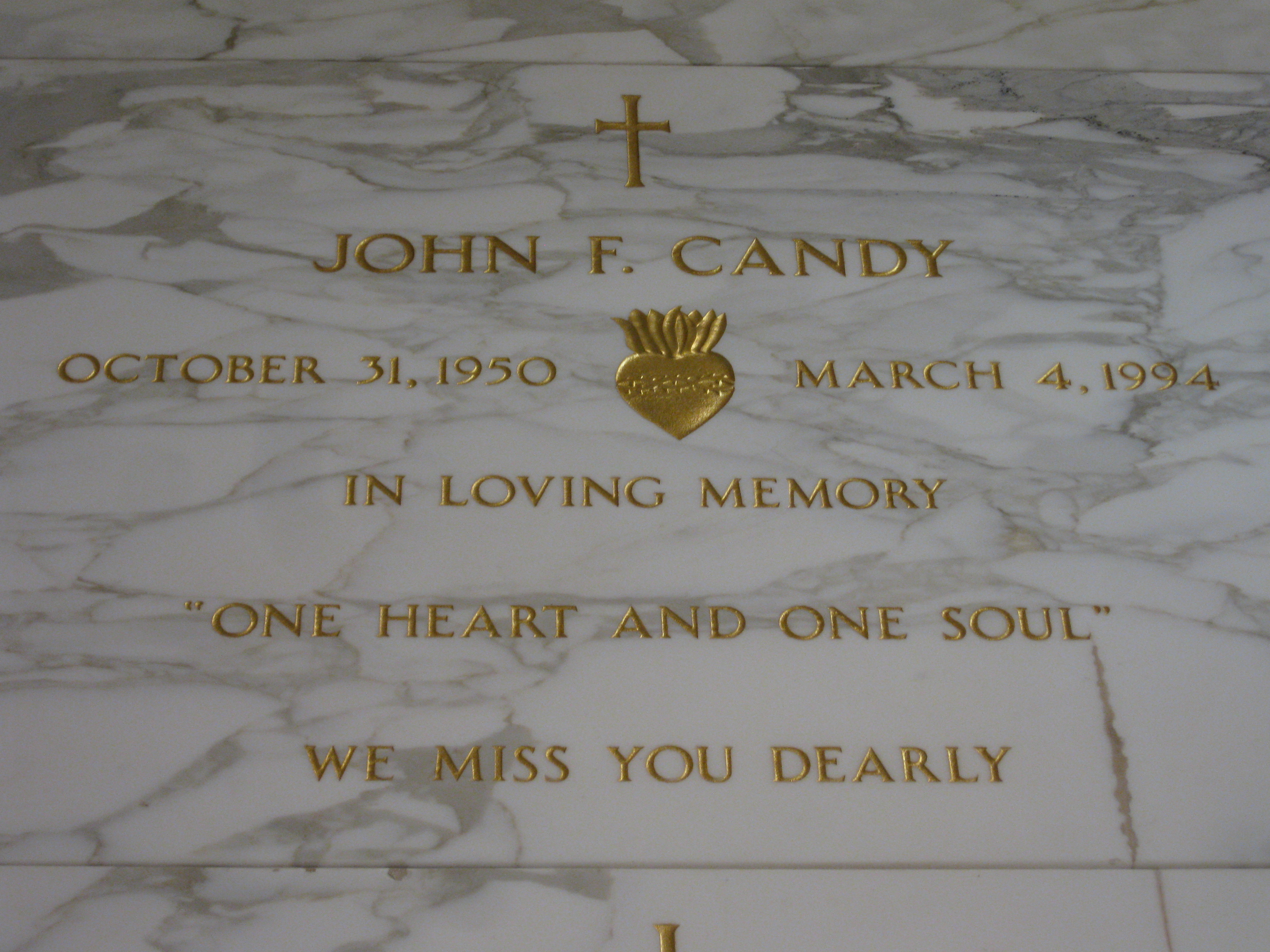
Candy's crypt in the mausoleum at Holy Cross Cemetery

On March 4, 1994, while filming Wagons East in the Mexican city of Durango, Candy suffered a suspected fatal heart attack in his sleep and died at the age of 43.

Candy had a number of risk factors for a heart attack: obesity, a history of his brother's heart attack and his father dying of a heart attack at age 35 on Candy's fifth birthday (though Candy's son said, “I don’t think he was aware of the genetic heart disease that was in the family."), his habit of smoking a pack of cigarettes per day, and his abuse of alcohol and cocaine. Candy had long struggled with his weight, weighing over 375 lb (170 kg) at some points in his life. He once lost 100 lb (45 kg) over a summer while preparing to film Planes, Trains and Automobiles. Candy frequently dieted and exercised with personal trainers, but was never able to fully overcome his lifelong struggles with obesity.

== Legacy ==
Candy's funeral was held at St. Martin of Tours Catholic Church in Los Angeles with a eulogy by Dan Aykroyd. He was entombed in the mausoleum at Holy Cross Cemetery in Culver City.

On March 18, 1994, a special memorial service for Candy, produced by his former improvisation troupe the Second City, was broadcast across Canada. Candy’s Home Alone costar Catherine O'Hara gave the eulogy, while her sister Mary Margaret O'Hara sang her song "Dark, Dear Heart".

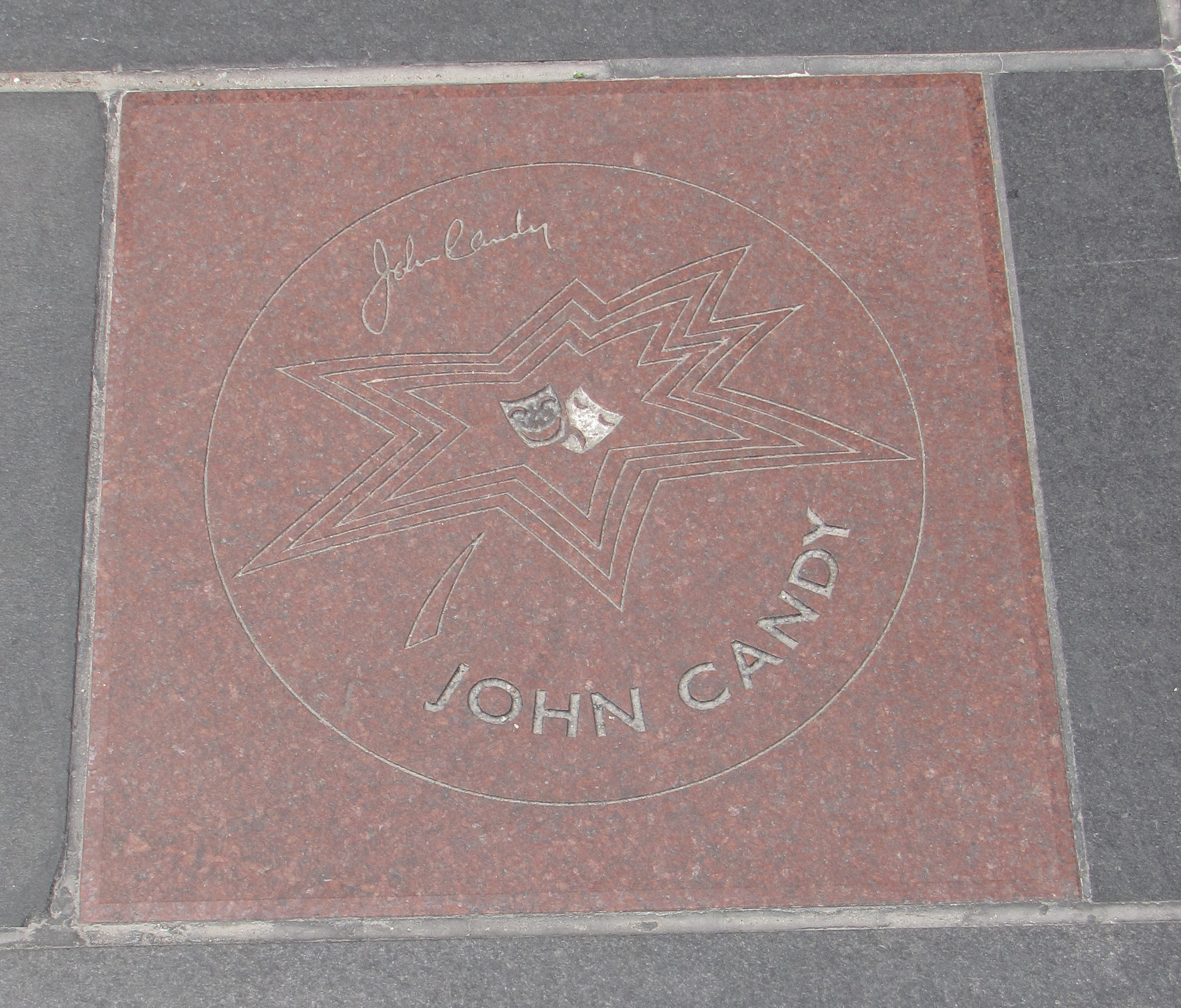
Candy's star on Canada's Walk of Fame

Wagons East, completed using an uncredited body double and special effects, was released five months after Candy's death. His final completed film was Canadian Bacon, a satirical comedy by acclaimed documentary filmmaker Michael Moore and released a year after Candy's death. Candy played American sheriff Bud Boomer, who led an "invasion" of Canada. Candy recorded a voice for the TV film The Magic 7 in the early 1990s. The film remained in production for years owing to animation difficulties and production delays, and it was eventually shelved.

Candy was posthumously inducted into Canada's Walk of Fame in 1998. In May 2006, Candy became one of the first four entertainers ever honoured by Canada Post by being featured on a postage stamp. On October 31, 2020, Toronto Mayor John Tory proclaimed "John Candy Day" in honour of what would have been Candy's 70^{th} birthday.

Blues Brothers 2000 is dedicated to Candy, who played a supporting role in the original Blues Brothers, as well as John Belushi and Cab Calloway. A tribute to Candy was hosted by Dan Aykroyd at the 2007 Grey Cup festivities in Toronto in November 2007.

Experimental rock band Ween's album Chocolate and Cheese, released in 1994, is "dedicated in loving memory to John Candy (1950–1994)". At the time, lead singer Gene Ween remarked: "There was so much going on about Kurt Cobain, and nobody mentioned John Candy at all. I have a special little spot in my heart for him".

After his death, the John Candy Visual Arts Studio at Neil McNeil Catholic High School in Toronto was dedicated in his honour. Candy, one of the school's most famous alumni, said during one of his annual visits to the school: "My success is simply rooted in the values and discipline and respect for others that I was taught at Neil McNeil". It has been suggested that the Canadian Screen Awards be given the official nickname "The Candys", both in honour of him and because the name suggests Canada.

American comedian Conan O'Brien met Candy while studying at Harvard University and told him: "Mr. Candy, I'm thinking I might try comedy". Candy replied very seriously: "You don't try comedy—you do it or you don't do it". O'Brien said this advice led to his career in comedy.

John Candy: I Like Me, a documentary film about Candy's life and career directed by Colin Hanks, premiered as the opening film of the 2025 Toronto International Film Festival on September 4. Some archival footage of Candy was also seen in the documentary film You Had to Be There, which premiered at the same festival two days later.

== Filmography ==
=== Film ===
Year	Title	Role	Notes
1973	Class of '44	Paule	Uncredited
1975	It Seemed Like a Good Idea at the Time	Kopek	
1976	Tunnel Vision	Cooper	
1976	The Clown Murders	Ollie	
1976	Find the Lady	Kopek	
1978	The Silent Partner	Simonsen	
1979	Lost and Found	Carpentier	
1979	1941	Pvt. Foley	
1980	Deadly Companion	John	
1980	The Blues Brothers	Parole Officer Burton Mercer	
1981	Stripes	Dewey "Ox" Oxberger	
1981	Heavy Metal	Den / Dan, Desk Sergeant, Robot	Voice roles
1982	It Came from Hollywood	Himself	
1983	National Lampoon's Vacation	Russ Lasky	
1983	Going Berserk	John Bourgignon	
1984	Splash	Freddie Bauer	
1985	Brewster's Millions	Spike Nolan	
1985	Sesame Street Presents: Follow That Bird	The Policeman	
1985	Summer Rental	Jack Chester	
1985	Volunteers	Tom Tuttle	
1986	Armed and Dangerous	Frank Dooley	
1986	Little Shop of Horrors	Wink Wilkinson	
1987	Spaceballs	Barf	
1987	Planes, Trains and Automobiles	Del Griffith	
1988	She's Having a Baby	Chet (from The Great Outdoors)	Uncredited
1988	The Great Outdoors	Chester "Chet" Ripley	
1988	Hot to Trot	Don	Voice role
1989	Who's Harry Crumb?	Harry Crumb	Also executive producer
1989	Speed Zone	Charlie Cronan	a.k.a. Cannonball Fever
1989	Uncle Buck	Buck Russell	
1990	Masters of Menace	Beer Truck Driver	
1990	Home Alone	Gus Polinski	
1990	The Rescuers Down Under	Wilbur	Voice role
1991	Nothing but Trouble	Dennis Valkenheiser, Eldona Valkenheiser	
1991	Career Opportunities	C.D. Marsh	Uncredited
1991	Only the Lonely	Danny Muldoon	
1991	Delirious	Jack Gable	
1991	JFK	Dean Andrews Jr.	
1992	Once Upon a Crime	Augie Morosco	
1993	Rookie of the Year	Cliff Murdoch (announcer)	Uncredited
1993	Cool Runnings	Irving "Irv" Blitzer	
1994	Wagons East	James Harlow	Released posthumously
1995	Canadian Bacon	Sheriff Bud Boomer	Filmed in 1993; released posthumously
2025	John Candy: I Like Me	Himself	Documentary; archival footage
2025	You Had to Be There	Himself	Documentary; archival footage

=== Television ===
Year	Title	Role	Notes
1972	Cucumber	Weatherman	Unknown episodes
1972	Dr. Simon Locke	Richie Beck / Ramon	2 episodes
1974	The ABC Afternoon Playbreak	2^{nd} son	Episode: "Last Bride of Salem"
1974	Dr. Zonk and the Zunkins		Unknown episodes
1976	The David Steinberg Show	Spider Reichman / Spider	6 episodes
1976	90 Minutes Live	(various)	TV series
1976–1977	Coming Up Rosie	Wally Wypyzypychwk	TV series (with Rosemary Radcliffe, Dan Aykroyd and Catherine O'Hara)
1976–1979	Second City TV	Johnny LaRue / / Various	50 episodes
1977	King of Kensington	Bandit	Episode: "The Hero"
1980	The Courage of Kavik, the Wolf Dog	Pinky	Television film
1980	Big City Comedy	Himself (host) / various	Television series (sketch comedy)
1980	Roadshow	Himself (host) / various	"Improvisational journalism" (at least 2 episodes)
1981	Tales of the Klondike	Hans Nelson	Miniseries; 1 episode
1981	Saturday Night Live	Juan Gavino	Episode: "George Kennedy/Miles Davis" (uncredited)
1981–1983	SCTV Network 90	Johnny LaRue / Zontar / Dr. Tongue / Yosh Shmenge / Various	38 episodes
1982	The Billy Crystal Comedy Hour	Orson Welles	1 episode
1983	Saturday Night Live	Host	Episode: "John Candy/Men at Work"
1983	SCTV Channel	Various	Episode: "Maudlin O' the Night"
1984	The New Show	Luciano Pavarotti / Orson Welles / Various	5 episodes
1985	Martin Short: Concert for the North Americas	Marcel	Television film
1985	The Last Polka	Yosh Shmenge, Pa Shmenge	Television film
1986	Really Weird Tales	Howard Jensen	Episode: "Cursed with Charisma"
1986	The Canadian Conspiracy	(various)	Television film
1988	Sesame Street, Special	Yosh Shmenge	Television film
1989	The Rocket Boy	The Hawk	Television film
1989	Camp Candy	Himself, Yosh Shmenge, Dr. Tongue, Various	40 episodes, main voice role
1989	The Wonderful World of Disney	Himself	Episode: "Donald, the Star-Struck Duck"
1990	The Dave Thomas Comedy Show		One episode
1992	Shelley Duvall's Bedtime Stories	Narrator	Episode: "Blumpoe the Grumpoe Meets Arnold the Cat/Millions of Cats"
1992	Boris and Natasha: The Movie	Kalishak	Television film
1994	Hostage for a Day	Yuri Petrovich	Final television film and only directed film; Uncredited role
2026	The Magic 7	Smokestack Sam	Voice role (posthumous release; recorded in late 1990s)

=== Music videos ===
Year	Song title	Artist	Role	Notes
1984	"Ghostbusters"	Ray Parker Jr.	Himself	Cameo; uncredited
1991	"Wilbury Twist"	Traveling Wilburys	Himself	Cameo; uncredited

== Accolades ==
Work	Year	Accolade / Category	Results	Ref
SCTV Network 90	1982	Primetime Emmy Award for Outstanding Writing in a Variety or Music Program (episode: "Tony Bennett")	Nominated	
SCTV Network 90	1982	Primetime Emmy Award for Outstanding Writing in a Variety or Music Program (episode: "Christmas Show")	Nominated	
SCTV Network 90	1982	Primetime Emmy Award for Outstanding Writing in a Variety or Music Program (episode: "Cycle Two, Show Two")	Nominated	
SCTV Network 90	1982	Primetime Emmy Award for Outstanding Writing in a Variety or Music Program (episode: "Moral Majority Show")	Won	
SCTV Network 90	1983	Primetime Emmy Award for Outstanding Writing in a Variety or Music Program (episode: "Towering Inferno")	Nominated	
SCTV Network 90	1983	Primetime Emmy Award for Outstanding Writing in a Variety or Music Program (episode: "Joe Walsh")	Nominated	
SCTV Network 90	1983	Primetime Emmy Award for Outstanding Writing in a Variety or Music Program (episode: "Robin Williams, America")	Nominated	
SCTV Network 90	1983	Primetime Emmy Award for Outstanding Writing in a Variety or Music Program (episode: "The Christmas Show")	Nominated	
SCTV Network 90	1983	Primetime Emmy Award for Outstanding Writing in a Variety or Music Program (episode: "The Energy Ball" + "Sweeps Week")	Won	
The Last Polka	1985	CableACE Award for Performance in a Comedy Special	Nominated	
The Last Polka	1985	CableACE Award for Comedy Special (shared with Eugene Levy & Jamie Paul Rock)	Nominated	
Splash	1985	Saturn Award for Best Supporting Actor	Nominated	
Planes, Trains and Automobiles	1988	American Comedy Award for Funniest Actor in a Motion Picture (Leading Role)	Nominated	
—N/a	1992	Banff Television Festival for Sir Peter Ustinov Award	Won	
Nothing But Trouble	1992	Golden Raspberry Award for Worst Supporting Actress (playing in drag)	Nominated	
Cool Runnings	1994	Kids' Choice Award for Favorite Movie Actor	Nominated	
—N/a	1995	Earle Grey Award (shared with Eugene Levy, Harold Ramis, Rick Moranis, Dave Thomas, Catherine O'Hara, Joe Flaherty, Andrea Martin & Martin Short)	Won	
