= Rituals (film) =

- Theatrical release poster
- Directed by: Peter Carter
- Written by: Ian Sutherland
- Produced by: Lawrence Dane; Harry H. Novak
- Starring: Hal Holbrook; Lawrence Dane; Robin Gammell; Ken James; Gary Reineke
- Cinematography: René Verzier
- Edited by: George Appleby
- Music by: Hagood Hardy
- Production companies: Astral Bellevue Pathé; Canadian Film Development Corporation; Canart Films; Famous Players
- Distributed by: Astral Films (Canada) Aquarius Releasing (US)
- Release dates: August 26, 1977 (Montreal); September 16, 1978 (Hartford, Connecticut)
- Running time: 100 minutes
- Country: Canada
- Language: English
- Budget: CA$600,000

Rituals is a 1977 Canadian horror-thriller film directed by Peter Carter, and starring Hal Holbrook, Lawrence Dane, and Robin Gammell. It centers on a group of doctors who are stalked and murdered while on a wilderness trip in remote Northern Ontario. The film was also released under the alternate title The Creeper. Upon retrospect, the film has been described as a proto-slasher.

== Plot ==
Five surgeons, all former medical school cohorts, go on a wilderness weekend retreat deep in the wilderness of Northern Ontario. Among them are a stalwart neurologist, Harry; Mitzi, a general surgeon; Martin, who has left his surgical career behind and now works as a general practitioner; Martin's brother, D.J.; and Abel. After being dropped off by plane, the men hike into the woods and build a campfire on a lake. As the night goes on, they begin to drink and bicker among themselves about whose field is more intellectually demanding. The following morning, each finds that his boots have been stolen.

D.J., already tired of the animosity among the group, volunteers to hike to a hydro-dam that, according to his map, is several miles away, presuming there will be people operating it who can help them. After D.J. leaves, that night, Mitzi finds a severed deer head hanging in front of their campsite, along with a snake curled around its spinal cord, resembling the caduceus. Everyone but Martin believe that D.J. is responsible. In the morning, the group embark to find D.J., but inadvertently set off a booby trap unleashing a beehive. Harry, Mitzi, and Martin flee, tumbling down a steep hill to a lake below to escape the bees, with Abel trailing behind them. From the water, Martin briefly glimpses a shadowy figure throwing Abel over the steep incline, causing him to break his neck, killing him. Harry and Mitzi again suspect D.J. for having caused the incident.

The three remaining men push onward, stopping along a river at dusk, exhausted. As Mitzi explores upstream, Harry and Martin have a brief conversation in which Martin confesses to Harry that he never wishes to pursue surgery again. He also reveals details about his alcoholism, as well as his failed relationship with a male lover. Harry responds with an anecdote about how he stopped drinking while serving in the Korean War. The conversation is interrupted when Mitzi locates a rope hanging over the river, which he suspects was left by D.J. The group plan to cross the river the following morning, camping overnight.

In the morning, while using the rope to cross the river, Martin steps on a bear trap in the water, breaking his leg. Mitzi suspects that perhaps they are being stalked and tormented by someone pursuing vengeance over a botched surgery. The men attempt to press on by traveling along the river, floating Martin on a stretcher. Tensions rise when the men attempt to scale a waterfall, and Harry and Mitzi get into a fight. Mitzi subsequently tries to apologize to Harry after the men camp onshore, and reminisces about their mutual friend, Andy, who died by suicide when they were in medical school.

The next day, Harry and Mitzi notice smoke emanating from a distant mountainside. Shortly after, they find someone has placed a World War II medal around Martin's neck, leading Harry to believe their stalker is a veteran. After carrying Martin up the mountain, the men stop to sleep overnight on one of the peaks. At dawn, Mitzi awakens and finds Abel's severed head on a stake in front of him. Mitzi refuses to help Harry carry Martin, insisting their attempt to save him is futile. Harry continues, dragging Martin on the stretcher behind him, but eventually collapses from exhaustion. Mitzi reappears, and continues to help carry their friend. They eventually reach the dam that D.J. was traveling to, only to find it abandoned and derelict. Overlooking it, they find D.J., barely alive, tortured and nailed to a chair. Tied to his body, Harry finds an overexposed x-ray and hospital discharge paperwork for a man named Matthew Crowley. After some contemplation, Harry performs a mercy killing on D.J., strangling him to death. While a dispirited Mitzi departs from the dam, Harry realizes that Martin is dead, and quietly mourns him before leaving the dam as well.

Alone, Harry locates an abandoned cabin, where he uncovers several World War II mementos, along with the group's stolen boots. An elderly hermit named Jesse arrives and attempts to attack Harry, but Harry soon realizes the man is blind. Jesse warns Harry to leave, commenting that his brother Matthew—a disfigured, brain-damaged war veteran—is dangerous. Moments later, Matthew arrives and begins stabbing through the wall, severing an artery in Harry's leg. Outside, Mitzi begins crying for help as Matthew prepares to burn him alive as an effigy. Harry begins to lose consciousness due to blood loss, and is forced to cauterize his own wound, but is unable to save Mitzi from the blaze. As Matthew slowly enters the cabin, Harry glimpses his disfigured face before shooting him to death. In the morning, Harry finally reaches a country road where he sits idly, awaiting the next passing car.

== Cast ==
- Hal Holbrook as Harry
- Lawrence Dane as Mitzi
- Robin Gammell as Martin
- Ken James as Abel
- Gary Reineke as D.J.
- Jack Creley as Jesse
- Michael Zenon as Matthew

== Production ==
Rituals was filmed in northern Ontario, Canada in mid-1976, on a budget of CA$600,000. According to actor Hal Holbrook, the shoot was very physically demanding; he noted that the sequence in which he and Lawrence Dane's character attempt to pull Martin (Robin Gammell) upstream on a river took five days to film.

== Release ==
The film opened in Montreal on August 26, 1977. It subsequently was released the United States in late 1978, screening in Hartford, Connecticut, beginning September 16, 1978.

=== Critical response ===
The Terror Trap awarded the film 3.5 out of 4 stars, praising the film's atmosphere, editing, and Holbrook's performance, calling it "[an] above average journey-into-hell gem".

Justin Kerswell of the slasher film website The Hysteria Lives! gave the film 4 out of 5 stars, writing: "Not since Deliverance ... has the wilderness held such terror"

John Townsend from HorrorNews.net praised the film, writing, "Watching Rituals having seen so many of these subsequent films drives home the fact that it is possible to make a taut, tense horror thriller without the need for huge swathes of special effects and gallons of fake blood. There is more character, story and enjoyment to be had in this film and in much of the current franchise put together."

TV Guide, however, awarded the film an unfavorable 1 out of 5 stars, calling it "[a] cheap north-of-the-border ripoff of Deliverance". Author and film critic Leonard Maltin gave the film 1.5 out of four stars, calling it "unpleasant".

Rituals gained additional minor recognition after American author of horror Stephen King had recommended it in his 1981 non-fiction book about the horror genre, Danse Macabre. King included Rituals in an appendix, which listed "roughly one hundred fantasy/horror films tied together by their time and their excellence", and marked the film as one of his "own personal favorites", although he did not know the name of the director.

=== Home media ===
Rituals was released on VHS by Embassy Home Entertainment in 1985. It was released for the first time on DVD by Mill Creek Entertainment on February 7, 2006 as a part of its Drive-In Movie Classics: 50 Movie Pack. Mill Creek re-released the film on April 10, 2007 in its Horror Classics: 100 Movie Pack. It was released by Code Red on DVD on April 19, 2011. On January 24, 2012, it was released by Filmchest under the alternate title The Creeper.

In January 2019, Scorpion Releasing released the film on Blu-ray in a limited edition, exclusively available for sale on the Ronin Flix website. Scorpion Releasing, in association with Kino Lorber, reissued the Blu-ray with an alternative cover art on January 21, 2021.
