= Find the Lady (1976 film) =

- Home video release front cover artwork
- Directed by: John Trent
- Written by: David Main; John Trent
- Produced by: David Main; John Trent
- Starring: John Candy; Mickey Rooney; Peter Cook; Lawrence Dane; Alexandra Bastedo
- Cinematography: Harry Waxman
- Edited by: Al Gell
- Music by: Robert Sharples
- Production companies: Quadrant Films; Impact Films
- Distributed by: Danton Films
- Release date: November 11, 1976
- Running time: 100 minutes
- Country: Canada
- Language: English

Find the Lady is a 1976 comedy film directed by John Trent. Though John Candy had small or supporting parts in several previous movies, this was the earliest film in which he had a lead role.

The film is a spin-off of the earlier film It Seemed Like a Good Idea at the Time, which features the Kopek (Candy) and Broom (Lawrence Dane) characters in a subplot.

The cast also includes Ed McNamara, Hugh Webster, Delroy Lindo and Mickey Rooney.

== Plot ==
Detective Roscoe Broom and his bumbling partner Kopek are assigned to a case involving the kidnapping of an opera singer, not realizing that she faked her own kidnapping to run away with her boyfriend. This causes problems for the detectives since two sets of kidnappers are after the woman.

== Cast ==
- Lawrence Dane as Broom
- John Candy as Kopek
- Dick Emery as Leo
- Mickey Rooney as Trigger
- Peter Cook as J.K. Lewisham
- Alexandra Bastedo as Victoria
- Richard Monette as Bruce La Rousse
- Bob Vinci as Frescobaldi
- Ed McNamara as Kominsky
- Tim Henry as Rick
- Michael Kirby as Docstetter
- Hugh Webster as Eddie
- Delroy Lindo as Sam
- Guy Big as Miniature Man

== Reception ==
The Calgary Herald wrote, "Find the Lady is a numbskull number about as funny as a slice of pizza in a hat... A British-Canadian co-production, Find the Lady stumbles from one worn-out comedy chestnut to another. There is the off-key opera singer, the transvestite who complains that life is a 'drag', lots of dumb blonds, and even dumber cops."
