= The Bush Baby =

1992 Japanese anime television series

- Title card
- 大草原の小さな天使 ブッシュベイビー
- Genre: Adventure, drama
- Based on: The Bushbabies by William Stevenson
- Screenplay by: Akira Miyazaki
- Directed by: Takayoshi Suzuki
- Music by: Akira Miyagawa
- Country of origin: Japan
- Original language: Japanese
- No. of episodes: 40

Production
- Executive producer: Koichi Motohashi
- Producers: Minoru Wada (Fuji TV); Yoshihiro Suzuki (Fuji TV); Takaji Matsudo
- Production companies: Fuji Television; Nippon Animation

Original release
- Network: FNS (Fuji TV)
- Release: January 12 – December 20, 1992

Bush Baby, Little Angel of the Grasslands (大草原の小さな天使 ブッシュベイビー, Daisougen no Chiisana Tenshi Busshubeibī), shortened as The Bush Baby, is the title of a 1992 anime series consisting of forty 25-minute episodes. It is based on the novel The Bushbabies (1965) by Canadian author William Stevenson.

The series is part of Fuji Television and Nippon Animation's World Masterpiece Theater franchise, which consists of anime television series adaptations of classic children's books. It has also been broadcast internationally on networks such as TVO/Access Alberta (Canada), France 3 (France), Antena 3 (Spain), Italia 1 (Italy), Tele 5/tm3 (Germany), ORF1 (Austria), ABS-CBN/GMA 7/Quality TeleVision (Philippines), various Arab networks (Arab World), and RTM2 (Malaysia).

The English dub for the series was handled by TVOntario from 1993 to 1995.

== Summary ==
In 1964, a thirteen-year-old British girl named Jackie Rhodes living in Kenya travels the savannah in the area of Mount Kilimanjaro, Kenya, where her father is an Animal Protection wildlife officer. Jackie finds an ill animal called a bushbaby.

Jackie adopts the bushbaby, calls him Murphy, and nurses him back to health. Murphy, Jackie, her family and their friends go on many adventures involving wild animals, poachers and more. When her father loses his job, the family prepares to return to England where they came from.

At Mombasa, right before they are about to leave, Jackie realizes that she has lost the papers for her pet bushbaby, Murphy. She leaves the ship heading for England and it sets sail without her. Luckily, she meets Tenbo, her father's loyal African assistant. Tenbo has been spying on the export warehouse of some poachers and is now being pursued by them. In addition, a manhunt for Tenbo has begun because people think he has kidnapped Jackie.

They must cross the dangerous savannah to escape the poachers and police officers chasing them. Along the way, Jackie teaches the now domesticated Murphy to survive in the wild, so that, before she leaves, she can release him in his natural habitat.

== Characters ==
=== Main characters ===
Jacqueline Rhodes (ジャックリーヌ・ローズ, Jakkurīnu Rōzu)
Voiced by: Maya Okamoto (Japanese); Pauline Little (English)
Jacqueline Rodes, AKA Jackie (ジャッキー, Jakkī), is the main character of the series. She is a 13-year-old British girl who has been fascinated by Africa since childhood. She is energetic, tomboyish and has a strong sense of justice influenced by her father in protecting African wildlife. She often goes on adventures with her pet bushbaby, Murphy. She is good at horseback riding.
Murphy (マーフィ, Māfi)
Voiced by: Yuri Shiratori
A young bushbaby Jackie raises to be her pet. Murphy was found by Jackie's brother, Andrew, as an infant after his home was disturbed by a charging rhinoceros that spooked his troop. Murphy's mother was killed by the rhino after it slammed her against the side of the vehicle Arthur was driving, leaving him orphaned. He is brought home and nursed back to health by Jackie. He becomes hyperactive and impish as he grows up. He likes mint candy but easily get intoxicated like a drunk and fall asleep. Jackie takes advantage of this and uses it as bait to calm him down.
Tenbo (テンボ・ムルンビ, Tenbo Murunbi)
Voiced by: Jūrōta Kosugi (Japanese); Mark Camacho (English)
Arthur's assistant in protecting the wildlife sanctuary and Jackie's friend, Tenbo is ex-soldier from the Royal Africa Rifle troop, and a brave warrior from a Camba tribe. He is good at playing the harmonica but he can't swim. Thanks to his good knowledge of nature and animals, the baby Murphy had been saved, since baby Murphy previously did not want to drink anything but the milk of his deceased mother. Jackie was very worried and lost hope that anyone could help her until Tenbo gave her some helpful advice.

=== Secondary characters ===
Andrew Rhodes (アンドルー・ローズ, Andorū Rōzu)
Voiced by: Junichi Kanemaru (Japanese); Daniel Brochu (English)
Jackie's older brother. Like his father, he dreams of becoming a wildlife protection officer, but is also interested in becoming a veterinarian after he meets Hanna. He had a pet chameleon named Ben before releasing him out into the wild.
Arthur Rhodes (アーサー・ローズ, Āsā Rōzu)
Voiced by: Takaya Hashi
Jackie and Andrew's father, he is the wildlife protection officer patrolling the sanctuary.
Penny Rhodes (ペニー・ローズ, Penī Rōzu)
Voiced by: Kumiko Takizawa (Japanese); Jane Woods (English)
Jackie and Andrew's mother, her hobbies are drawing and painting.
Hawa (ハワ, Hawa)
Voiced by: Mami Matsui
She is a helper working at the Rhodes' household.
Kate Addleton (ケイト・アドルトン, Keito Adoruton)
Voiced by: Miyuki Matsushita
Kate is Jackie's best friend and classmate at school.
Laisa Addleton (ライサ・アドルトン, Raisa Adoruton)
Voiced by: Ai Satou
Kate's mother, she owns and runs the coffee farm.
Henry Rutherford (ヘンリー・ラザフォード, Henrī Razafōdo)
Voiced by: Bin Shimada (Japanese); Bruce Dinsmore (English)
Henry is Laisa's younger brother and Kate's uncle. He is an engineer from an airline industry.
Micky Bill (ミッキー・ビル, Mikkī Biru)
Voiced by: Youko Matsuoka
Jackie's classmate at school, he is a mischievous boy who likes to cause trouble for Jackie and Kate.
Hanna Kaufmann (ハンナ・カウフマン, Hanna Kaufuman)
Voiced by: Youko Sasaki (Japanese); Sonja Ball (English)
She is the veterinarian who inspires Andrew to want to be one.
Professor Crankshaw (クランクショウ博士, Kurankushou-hakase)
Voiced by: Kenichi Ogata (Japanese); Walter Massey (English)
He is an archaeologist living in Kenya for more than 30 years. He travels all around Africa to find and excavate ruins of lost civilizations. He flies around these sites using his airplane, which he nicknamed Mother Goose.
Sally
Voiced by: Sonja Ball
Micky's little sister.
Dan Moore
Repairman that was helping poachers for money. He has a change of heart after Jackie finds the poachers' hideout.
Lt. Robert Ireland
A friend of Jackie's father, originally Tenbo's commanding officer in the Royal Africa Rifle troop.
Safina
A young girl close to Jackie's age from the Maasai tribe.

=== Villains ===
Michael and John
A duo of poachers.

== List of episodes ==
No.	Title	Original release date
1	"A Baby Found in the Grasslands"; Transliteration: "Sōgen de Hirotta Akachan" (Japanese: 草原で拾った赤ちゃん)	January 12, 1992
2	"Don't Die, Murphy"; Transliteration: "Shinanaide Māfi" (Japanese: 死なないでマーフィ)	January 19, 1992
3	"Rose and the Mechanism"; Transliteration: "Shikakeya Rōzu" (Japanese: しかけやローズ)	January 26, 1992
4	"Search for the Nursing Bottle"; Transliteration: "Honyūbin wo Sagase" (Japanese: 哺乳ビンをさがせ)	February 2, 1992
5	"The Wounded Elephant"; Transliteration: "Kizutsuita Zō" (Japanese: 傷ついた象)	February 16, 1992
6	"Murphy's Illness"; Transliteration: "Māfi no Byōki" (Japanese: マーフィの病気)	February 19, 1992
7	"Hanna, the Female Veterinarian"; Transliteration: "Josei Jūi Hanna" (Japanese: 女性獣医ハンナ)	February 23, 1992
8	"The Professor's Plane"; Transliteration: "Hakase no Hikouki" (Japanese: 博士の飛行機)	March 1, 1992
9	"Midnight Walk"; Transliteration: "Mayonaka no Osanpo" (Japanese: 真夜中のお散歩)	March 8, 1992
10	"Repairman Dan Moore"; Transliteration: "Shūriya Dan Mūa" (Japanese: 修理屋ダン·ムーア)	March 15, 1992
11	"Detective Group Formed!"; Transliteration: "Tanteidan Kessei!" (Japanese: 探偵団結成!)	March 22, 1992
12	"Peppermint and Poachers"; Transliteration: "Hakka Ame to Mitsuryōsha" (Japanese: ハッカアメと密猟者)	April 19, 1992
13	"Detective Group plus 1"; Transliteration: "Tanteidan Purasu 1" (Japanese: 探偵団プラス1)	April 26, 1992
14	"Baboon Attack"; Transliteration: "Hihi no Shūgeki" (Japanese: ヒヒの襲撃)	May 3, 1992
15	"The Mysterious Baobab Tree"; Transliteration: "Fushigina Ki Baobabu" (Japanese: ふしぎな木バオバブ)	May 10, 1992
16	"The Secret Cave"; Transliteration: "Himitsu no Horaana" (Japanese: 秘密のほらあな)	May 17, 1992
17	"The Poaching Gang Appears"; Transliteration: "Mitsuryōdan Arawaru" (Japanese: 密猟団現わる)	May 24, 1992
18	"The Vest Incident"; Transliteration: "Chokki Sōdō" (Japanese: チョッキ騒動)	May 31, 1992
19	"The Beginning of Destiny"; Transliteration: "Unmei no Hajimari" (Japanese: 運命のはじまり)	June 7, 1992
20	"Kilimanjaro in the Mist"; Transliteration: "Kiri no Kirimanjaro" (Japanese: 霧のキリマンジャロ)	June 14, 1992
21	"Goodbye, Kate"; Transliteration: "Sayounara Keito" (Japanese: さようならケイト)	June 21, 1992
22	"The Permit is Gone"; Transliteration: "Nakunatta Kyokashō" (Japanese: 無くなった許可証)	June 28, 1992
23	"The Wharf Incident"; Transliteration: "Hatoba no Daijiken" (Japanese: 波止場の大事件)	July 12, 1992
24	"Alone in Africa"; Transliteration: "Afurika Hitori Bocchi" (Japanese: アフリカひとりぼっち)	August 8, 1992
25	"An Arrest Warrant for Tenbo!?"; Transliteration: "Tenbo ni Taihojō!?" (Japanese: テンボに逮捕状!?)	August 16, 1992
26	"Murphy's Misfortune"; Transliteration: "Māfi no Sainan" (Japanese: マーフィの災難)	August 23, 1992
27	"The Pursuer and the Pursued"; Transliteration: "Ou Hito, Owareru Hito" (Japanese: 追う人、追われる人)	August 30, 1992
28	"Elephants in the Jungle"; Transliteration: "Mitsurin no Zō-tachi" (Japanese: 密林の象たち)	September 6, 1992
29	"Bring Back the Wild!!"; Transliteration: "Yasei wo Torimodose!!" (Japanese: 野生を取りもどせ!!)	September 13, 1992
30	"Law of the Savannah"; Transliteration: "Sabanna no Okite" (Japanese: サバンナのおきて)	September 20, 1992
31	"Poisoned Arrow and Harmonica"; Transliteration: "Dokuya to Hāmonika" (Japanese: 毒矢とハーモニカ)	September 27, 1992
32	"Tenbo the Kind Warrior"; Transliteration: "Yasashii Senshi Tenbo" (Japanese: やさしい戦士·テンボ)	October 25, 1992
33	"Run Towards the Flames!"; Transliteration: "Honoo ni Mukatte Hashire!" (Japanese: 炎に向かって走れ!)	November 1, 1992
34	"Cabin of the Masai Tribe"; Transliteration: "Masaizoku no Koya" (Japanese: マサイ族の小屋)	November 8, 1992
35	"Jackie Collapses!!"; Transliteration: "Jakkī Taoreru!!" (Japanese: ジャッキー倒れる!!)	November 15, 1992
36	"The Leopard and the Two Warriors"; Transliteration: "Hyō to Futari no Senshi" (Japanese: 豹と二人の戦士)	November 22, 1992
37	"Memories on a Rainy Day"; Transliteration: "Ame no Hi no Omoide" (Japanese: 雨の日の思い出)	November 29, 1992
38	"The Train is Swept Away!?"; Transliteration: "Ressha ga Nagasareru!?" (Japanese: 列車が流される!?)	December 6, 1992
39	"Run, Murphy"; Transliteration: "Kakenukero Māfi" (Japanese: 駈けぬけろマーフィ)	December 13, 1992
40	"Goodbye, Murphy"; Transliteration: "Māfi no Sayounara" (Japanese: マーフィのさようなら)	December 20, 1992

== Music ==
Opening theme

- "APOLLO": Eps. 01 – 22
  Lyrics and composition by: Shinji Tanimura
  Arrangement by: Yasuo Sakou
  Song by: Yasuhide Sawa
- "A Smile as Prologue" (微笑みでプロローグ, Hohoemi de Purorōgu): Eps. 23 – 40
  Lyrics by: Neko Oikawa
  Composition by: Masayuki Kishi
  Arrangement by: Kazuo Shinoda
  Song by: Satoko Yamano

Ending theme

- "I'll Turn into a Bird" (鳥になる, Tori ni Naru)
  Lyrics and composition by: Shinji Tanimura
  Arrangement by: Yasuo Sakou
  Song by: Maya Okamoto
