= Big City Comedy =

Canadian sketch comedy television series

- Genre: Sketch comedy
- Written by: John Candy; Jim Fisher; Mike Short; Jim Staahl
- Directed by: Mark Warren
- Starring: John Candy; Tino Insana; Tim Kazurinsky; Don Lamont; Audrie Neenan; Patti Oatman
- Country of origin: Canada
- Original language: English
- No. of seasons: 1
- No. of episodes: 13

Production
- Producers: John Candy; Carolyn Raskin
- Running time: 30 minutes
- Production company: Osmond Television

Original release
- Network: CTV
- Release: September 26, 1980

Big City Comedy was a Canadian sketch comedy television series starring John Candy that premiered on the CTV Television Network on September 26, 1980. The half-hour series was produced by Osmond Television and recorded at the studios of CFTO-TV in Toronto. It aired on Fridays at 7:30 p.m. during the 1980–81 television season.

== Production ==
The series was developed from the 1979 television special The Second City Comedy Show, following Candy's departure from Second City Television. Produced in Utah by Osmond Television in association with The Second City, the special featured Candy alongside Tino Insana, Bruce Jarchow, Tim Kazurinsky, Audrie Neenan and Ann Ryerson.

The special involved several figures from Chicago's Second City company. Second City co-founder Bernard Sahlins served as an executive producer alongside Paul Klein. Its writers included Candy, Denise DeClue, Kazurinsky and Sheldon Patinkin, while Fred Kaz served as musical director and led the Fred Kaz Comedy Band.

For the weekly series, Don Lamont and Patti Oatman replaced Jarchow and Ryerson. The writing staff included Jim Fisher, Jim Staahl and Mike Short. Fisher and Staahl were Chicago Second City alumni who had previously formed the comedy trio the Graduates with Insana. Guest performers included Billy Crystal, Martin Mull, Fred Willard, McLean Stevenson and Margaret Trudeau.

The series was taped at a rate of three episodes per week, with 13 episodes planned. Each episode featured a celebrity guest in a scripted interview with Candy, followed by sketches involving the guest and the regular cast, and a concluding interview. Candy acted, wrote and produced the series. NBC was also involved in the production and planned to broadcast the program on eight of its owned-and-operated stations.

Sketches included a travel agent's guide to Toronto and Johnny Toronto, a character resembling Candy's Johnny LaRue from SCTV. Candy described the show's format as a combination of Saturday Night Live and original material.

The program ran for 13 episodes. Candy portrayed several characters, including Mr. Mambo and an impersonation of Orson Welles. A 60-minute compilation was subsequently released on VHS. Candy returned to SCTV following the cancellation of Big City Comedy.

Margaret Trudeau made her television comedy debut in an episode taped on August 7, 1980. In a parody of The Perils of Pauline, Trudeau played a woman tied to railway tracks, while John Candy portrayed a villain who questioned her about her relationship with a Canadian prime minister. Trudeau had agreed to participate after attending an earlier taping of the series.

== Publicity and reception ==
On September 13, 1980, Candy and the six-member cast of Big City Comedy performed in An Evening With John Candy at Convocation Hall in Toronto. Reviewing the three-hour performance for The Globe and Mail, Alan Niester criticized the ensemble's sketches but praised Candy's improvisational ability, suggesting that Candy was more effective performing independently of the troupe.

Comedian Mike Myers attended the Convocation Hall performance as a teenager. According to his brother, Paul Myers, Mike approached Candy backstage and asked for advice about pursuing a career in comedy. Candy recommended taking workshops at The Second City in Toronto, which Paul Myers credited with setting his brother on the path to a career in sketch comedy.
