= John Trent (director) =

British-born Canadian film director (1935–1983)

John Trent (1935, in London – June 3, 1983, in Snelgrove) was a British-born Canadian film director. He directed such films as Homer, Middle Age Crazy, and It Seemed Like a Good Idea at the Time.

== Career ==
Before working in feature films, Trent worked in Canadian television in the 1960s, directing episodes of such popular CBC series as Quentin Durgens, M.P. and Wojeck, based on the career of the controversial Dr. Morton Shulman, then Toronto’s chief coroner. In addition to producing his own films, his company Quadrant Films also produced such fare as Bob Clark's vampire horror film Deathdream.

== Accidental death ==
Trent died in a road accident while returning from delivering his son, who was the Ontario Under 16 show-jumping champion, to an event. He was killed by a police car which came around a bend on the wrong side, and hit his compact Cadillac head-on.

== Selected filmography ==
Year	Title	Notes
1969	The Bushbaby	Also producer
1970	Homer	
1972	The Whiteoaks of Jalna	Television miniseries. Also co-producer
1974	Deathdream	Producer only
1974	Sunday in the Country	
1975	It Seemed Like a Good Idea at the Time	Also Co-Writer
1976	Find the Lady	Also Co-Writer
1979	Riel	Television film, Producer only
1980	Middle Age Crazy	
1981	Freddie the Freeloader's Christmas Dinner	Television special
