= Lawrence Dane =

Canadian actor and director (1937–2022)

- Born: Lawrence Joseph Zahab; April 3, 1937; Masson-Angers, Quebec, Canada
- Died: March 21, 2022 (aged 84); Niagara-on-the-Lake, Ontario, Canada
- Other name: Larry Zahab
- Occupations: Actor, film producer
- Years active: 1958–2017
- Spouse: Mary Laurel MacIntosh

Lawrence Joseph Zahab (April 3, 1937 – March 21, 2022), known professionally as Lawrence Dane, was a Canadian actor and film producer, best known for his role as Lt. Preston in Bride of Chucky.

== Life and career ==
Born in Masson, Quebec, Dane was raised in Ottawa, and was from a Lebanese family. He attended Ottawa Tech and LaSalle Academy.

Dane began acting at the stage as an old policeman in the play Our Town at Ottawa's Fisher Park Community Centre under Lynne Gorman's direction in 1958. Dane's screen career began when he met film maker F. R. Crawley in the same year. Crawley gave Dane a job as an extra and stand-in for John Perkins as Constable Frank Scott in the TV series R.C.M.P.. Dane also cowrote and directed the film drama Heavenly Bodies (1984). His producing credits include The Rowdyman, written by and starring Gordon Pinsent, and the slasher film Rituals.

Dane was a Genie Award nominee for Best Supporting Actor at the 1st Genie Awards in 1980 for the film Running, and an Earle Grey Award nominee at the 10th ACTRA Awards in 1981 for the television film A Question of the Sixth.

== Personal life ==
Dane married Mary Laurel MacIntosh in 1995, who survived him.

== Death ==
Dane died from pancreatic cancer at Niagara-on-the-Lake, Ontario on March 21, 2022; he was 84 years old.

== Filmography ==
=== Film ===
Lawrence Dane film credits
Year	Title	Role	Notes
1963	Stand By For Life	Doctor	Short
1974	Only God Knows	Vincenzo	Producer
1975	The Heatwave Lasted Four Days	Jerry Cuozzo	
1975	It Seemed Like a Good Idea at the Time	Broom	
1976	The Clown Murders	Philip	
1976	Find the Lady	Broom	
1977	Rituals	Mitzi	Producer
1979	Running	Coach Walker	
1979	Bear Island	Paul Hartman	
1980	Nothing Personal	Ralston	
1980	Head On	Frank Keys	
1981	Scanners	Braedon Keller	
1981	Happy Birthday to Me	Hal Wainwright	
1982	Love	Mr. Wiseman (Segment: Julia)	
1983	Of Unknown Origin	Eliot Riverton	
1987	Rolling Vengeance	Big Joe Rosso	
1989	Millennium	Vern Rockwell	
1992	Twin Sisters	Boone	Video
1995	Darkman II: The Return of Durant	Dr. Alfred Hathaway	Video
1995	National Lampoon's Senior Trip	Senator John Lerman	
1995	It Takes Two	Mr. Kensington	
1998	Bride of Chucky	Lt. Preston	
2000	Waking the Dead	Governor Kinosis	
2001	Fall: The Price of Silence	Joseph King	
2002	Duct Tape Forever	Prosecutor	
2005	King's Ransom	Officer Holland	
2007	Still Small Voices	Henry Waiverly	
2008	Behind the Wall	Father Hendry	
2010	Sofia	Professor Campbell	Short
2017	Undercover Grandpa	Wolf	

=== Television ===
Lawrence Dane television credits
Year	Title	Role	Notes
1959	The Unforeseen	Granz	1 Episode: The Freedom Fighters
1960	Shadow of a Pale Horse	Jem	TV movie
1960	R.C.M.P.	James Morton / Harry Benson / Johnny Wolf	4 episodes: Three Big Men, Johnny Wolf, Tourist Bait, The Extortionist
1960	Point of Departure	Mathias	TV movie
1960–1961	Encounter	Phil	2 episodes: Rehearsal for Invasion, Riel: Part 1
1960-62	Festival	Maupa	3 episodes: Julius Caesar, The Queen and the Rebels, The Day of the Dodo
1961	Macbeth	Seyton	TV movie
1961	First Person		1 Episode: Wise Guy
1961–1962	Playdate	Gerry Roach / Charlie	3 episodes: Stop the World and Let Me Off, One Man to Beat, You Can't Win 'Em All
1961–1962	Wayne and Shuster		3 episodes: The Mona Lisa Mystery, Bandana, The Touchables
1962	On the Road		1 Episode
1963	ITV Play of the Week	John James Davis	1 Episode: The Fixers
1963	Wayne and Shuster	El Rojo	1 Episode: Theresa
1964	Espionage	Guard	1 Episode: The Liberators
1964	The Detective	Jeff Pastor	1 Episode: The Night of the Horns
1964	The Sullavan Brothers	Capt. Hersch	1 Episode: One for the Day of Judgement
1964	Strangers in Ste. Angele	Sgt. Bellemare	1 episode
1965	The Forest Rangers	John Mandamin / Indian	2 episodes: Santa Macleod, The Choice
1965	The Mask of Janus	Bob Miller	2 episodes: The Cold Equation, The Arranger
1966	This Man Craig	Bardossy	1 Episode: Three's Company
1967	Jericho	Colonel Baumer	1 Episode: The Loot of All Evil
1967	I Spy	Boris	1 Episode: Blackout
1967	The Invaders	Josef Dansk	1 Episode: The Captive
1967–1969	Felony Squad	Jack Heath / Protector (Garth) / Metz	3 episodes: Let Him Die!, The Pat Hand of Death, The Last Man in the World
1967–1971	Mission: Impossible	Martin Stoner / Commandante Juan Acero / Dr. Anton Yubov	3 episodes: The Survivors, Commandante, Encounter
1968	It Takes a Thief	Capt. Van Zandt	1 Episode: A Matter of Royal Larceny
1968–1969	The Virginian	Jacques / Tasker	3 episodes: The Decision, The Wind of Outrage, Journey to Scathelock
1968–1973	The F.B.I.	Lorne Joseph Staley / Frank Sawyer / Julian Young	3 episodes: Wind It Up and It Betrays You, The Inside Man, Memory of a Legend
1969	Bonanza	Paul Rodgers	1 Episode: Sweet Annie Laurie
1969	Lancer	Dave Macall	1 Episode: The Wedding
1970	House on Greenapple Road	Reverend Ryan Hagen	TV movie
1970	The Young Rebels		1 Episode: Father and I Went Down to Camp
1970	The Mod Squad	John Mackey / Major Sarif	2 episodes: The Exile, Just Ring the Bell Once
1976	Our Man Flint: Dead on Target		TV movie
1978	Hedda Gabler	Judge Brack	TV movie
1980	A Question of the Sixth	Garnet Burton	TV movie
1982	Little Gloria... Happy at Last		1 Episode: Part 1
1982	Shocktrauma	Dr. Jordan Tracy	TV movie
1983	The Littlest Hobo	Alistair McLeod	1 Episode: Lumberjacks
1983	A Case of Libel	Coles	TV movie
1985	In Like Flynn	Gavin	TV movie
1985	The Park Is Mine	Commissioner Keller	TV movie
1985	The Hitchhiker	Surgeon / Cop	1 Episode: Out of the Night
1986–1988	Danger Bay	Montgomery Dunn	2 episodes: Poison Bay, To Glimpse a Unicorn
1987	Seeing Things	Jonathan	1 Episode: Eye of the Beholder
1987	Airwolf	Commander Kirov	2 episodes: Stavograd: Part 1 & 2
1987–1988	Alfred Hitchcock Presents	Joe Metcalf / Mr. Adams	2 episodes: If the Shoe Fits, Prosecutor
1988	The Equalizer	Arthur Trent	1 Episode: "The Mystery of Manon" (Part 2)
1988	Memories of Manon	Arthur Trent	TV movie
1988	The Christmas Wife	Michael Rosten	TV movie Uncredited
1989	E.N.G.	Mayor Dane	3 episodes: Dirty Trick, E.N.G. Pilot: Part 1 & 2
1989	Day One		TV movie
1989	Bionic Showdown: The Six Million Dollar Man and the Bionic Woman	General Dzerinsky	TV movie
1989	In Opposition	Joe Reynolds	1 Episode
1990	Counterstrike	Inspector Dantley	Episode: "Dealbreaker"
1990	Top Cops	Paul LeBeouf	1 Episode: Paul LeBoeuf/Johnny Kai
1990	The Last Best Year	John Dennis	TV movie
1990	Star Runner	Fenton	TV movie
1990–1992	Rin Tin Tin: K-9 Cop	Nelson Beck	3 episodes: Endangered Species, Counterfeit Love, Trapped
1991–1992	Street Legal	Judge Appleby	7 episodes
1992	Devlin	Art Wolfe	TV movie
1992	Secret Service	Nooch	1 Episode: Curiosity Killed the Cat/Murder, He Broke
1992	Tropical Heat	Plentera	1 Episode: White Hot
1992	Scales of Justice	Justice Toy	1 Episode: Regina vs. Pappajohn
1992	The Good Fight	Tom Rothermill	TV movie
1992	Amy Fisher: My Story	Elliot Fisher	TV movie
1993	African Skies	Tom Dutton	1 Episode: The Hunted
1993–1994	The Red Green Show	Reg Hunter	5 episodes
1994	Kung Fu: The Legend Continues	Sibert	1 Episode: Out of the Woods
1995	Vanished	Judge Morrison	TV movie
1995	Black Fox	Colonel McKensie	TV movie
1995	Black Fox: Good Men and Bad	Colonel McKensie	TV movie
1995	Almost Golden: The Jessica Savitch Story	Emmertz Canterbury	TV movie
1994–1996	Side Effects	Tom Stockton	15 episodes
1996	Double Jeopardy	Judge Thornim	TV movie
1996	The Outer Limits	General Covington	1 Episode: Trial by Fire
1996	Mr. and Mrs. Loving	Sheriff	TV movie
1996–1997	Poltergeist: The Legacy	Ned Gregson / Sir Edmund Tremain	2 episodes: A Traitor Among Us, Silent Partner
1997	On the Second Day of Christmas	Mr. Limber	TV movie
1998	Moonlight Becomes You	Malcolm Moore	TV movie
1998	Mr. Headmistress	Rawlings	TV movie
1998	Escape: Human Cargo	Pinder	TV movie
1998	The Long Island Incident	Tommy	TV movie
1998	Highlander: The Raven	Charlie Johnson Sr.	1 Episode: So Shall You Reap
1999	Too Rich: The Secret Life of Doris Duke	John Radford	TV movie
1999	Lethal Vows	Detective Rick Mauser	TV movie
1999	Thrill Seekers	FBI Agent Baker	TV movie
2000	The Hunger	Barry Seecam	1 Episode: I'm Very Dangerous Tonight
2000	Rated X	Robert De Salvo	TV movie
2000	La Femme Nikita	Maurice Grenet	2 episodes: Face in the Mirror, Up the Rabbit Hole
2000	The Last Debate	Sidney Robert Mulvane	TV movie
2001	Stargate SG-1	Major General Bauer	1 Episode: Chain Reaction
2001	Fall: The Price of Silence	Joseph King	TV movie
2001	Queer as Folk	Jack Kinney	3 episodes: Babylon Boomerang, A Change of Heart, Surprise Kill
2001	MythQuest	King Minos	1 Episode: The Minotaur
2001	Doc		1 Episode: Gypsies, Janitors and Thieves
2002	Guilty Hearts	Les Moran	TV movie
2002	Crossing the Line	Coach Tom Holliday	TV movies
2002	Breaking News	Donald Simms	1 Episode: Wall-To-Wall Plane Crash
2003	Phenomenon II	Rawlings	TV movie
2005	Puppets Who Kill	The Colonel	1 Episode: Buttons on a Hot Tin Roof
2006	The Perfect Marriage	Donald Danforth	TV movie
2006	Angela's Eyes	August Lambert	1 Episode: Open Your Eyes
2006	Absolution	Bishop Edward Werther	TV movie
2008	The Perfect Marriage	Wade, Nugget's Dad	1 Episode: Pill for Men
2009	Everything She Ever Wanted	George Allanson	Mini-Series
2010	You Lucky Dog	Clay Rayborn	TV movie
2011	Flashpoint	Arthur Bell	1 Episode: The War Within
2013	A Very Merry Mix-Up	Charles	TV movie

== Stage ==
Lawrence Dane stage credits
Year	Title	Role	Notes
1959	Dark of the Moon	Mr. Allen	run started on 12 January at Ottawa Little Theatre
1962	Macbeth	Angus	18 June – 29 September at Festival Theatre, Stratford, Ontario
1962	The Tempest	various roles	18 June – 29 September at Festival Theatre, Stratford, Ontario
1962	Cyrano de Bergerac		18 June – 29 September at Festival Theatre, Stratford, Ontario
