= William Stevenson (Canadian writer) =

Canadian author and journalist

William Henry Stevenson
- Born: 1 June 1924; Marylebone, London, England
- Died: 26 November 2013 (aged 89); Toronto, Ontario, Canada
- Occupation: author

William Henry Stevenson (1 June 1924 – 26 November 2013) was a British-born Canadian author and journalist.

His 1976 book A Man Called Intrepid was about William Stephenson (no relation) and was a best-seller. It was made into a 1979 mini-series starring David Niven. Stevenson followed it in 1983 with another book, Intrepid's Last Case. He published his autobiography in 2012.

In 1976 Stevenson released the book, 90 Minutes at Entebbe. It was about Operation Entebbe, an operation where Israeli commandos landed at night at Entebbe Airport in Uganda and succeeded in rescuing the passengers of an airliner hi-jacked by Palestinian militants, while incurring very few casualties. Stevenson's "instant book" was written, edited, printed and available for sale within weeks of the event it described.

== The Revolutionary King ==
The first biography of King Bhumibol Adulyadej of Thailand, The Revolutionary King was written by Stevenson. Stevenson was chosen by Bhumibol himself after reading A Man Called Intrepid, a highly controversial and hagiographic biography of the Canadian Spymaster William Stephenson which had been widely criticized and discredited by veterans and historians of the CIA, MI6, and Canadian Intelligence. Despite this, Bhumibol allegedly became obsessed with the book and personally translated it from English to Thai and had the Army and the Postal Service distribute thousands of copies. Paul M. Handley commented on Stevenson's book on pages 437-439 of The King Never Smiles:

"Ten years earlier, Bhumibol had invited William Stevenson, the author of the original Intrepid, to write the book. Stevenson lodged in the princess mother's Srapathum Palace and was provided research support and unprecedented interviews with court staff and the king himself ... The result was a book that presents Bhumibol as truly inviolate, magical, and godly ... the book is chock-full of the standard Ninth Reign mythology, matching the view of the palace and royal family projected in Thai publications ... When it came out, the book proved a misadventure. Stevenson was liberal with style and careless with facts to the point of embarrassing the palace. His errors were legion. The book opened with a map that showed Thailand in possession of significant portions of Laos and Burma, and put the king's Hua Hin palace 300 kilometers and a sea away from where it should be. It ended with a genealogical chart naming Rama VII as the son of his brother Rama VI ... (But) Thousands of copies circulated in Thailand, and the general reaction was to castigate the author's failings while not questioning the essence of his story, the magical and sacral monarchy of Bhumibol Adulyadej."

— Paul M. Handley

== Bibliography ==
- The Yellow Wind, 1959, Houghton Mifflin Co., LCCN 59--11830, OCLC 1227740. Reportage on the People's Republic of China between 1954 and 1957.
- The Bushbabies, 1965, Houghton Mifflin Co., LCCN 65--22509, OCLC 230064. Children's story inspired by his own family's adventures in Africa.
- The Bormann Brotherhood, 1973 (non-fiction)
- A Man Called Intrepid, 1976, Harcourt, ISBN 0-15-156795-6. (non-fiction)
- The Ghosts of Africa, 1980, Harcourt, ISBN 978-0-15-135338-5 ISBN 0151353387. Historical fiction set in World War I colonial German East Africa.
- Intrepid's Last Case, 1983, Michael Joseph Ltd, ISBN 0-7181-2441-3. (non-fiction)
- Eclipse, 1986 (fiction)
- Booby Trap, 1987 (fiction)
- Kiss the Boys Goodbye: How the United States Betrayed Its Own POWs in Vietnam, 1990, Dutton, ISBN 0-525-24934-6. Co-written with his wife Monika Jensen-Stevenson. (non-fiction)
- 90 Minutes at Entebbe, Bantam, ISBN 0-553-10482-9 (non-fiction)
- Strike Zion 1967 (non-fiction)
- Zanek!; A Chronicle of the Israeli Force (non-fiction)
- The Revolutionary King: : the true-life sequel to the King and I, 2001, Constable and Robinson, ISBN 1-84119-451-4.
- Spymistress: The Life of Vera Atkins, the Greatest Female Secret Agent of World War II, 2006, Arcade Publishing, ISBN 978-1-55970-763-3. (biography)
- Past to Present: A Reporter's Story of War, Spies, People, and Politics, Lyons Press, 2012.
