= Gig (Northern Pikes album) =

Live album by The Northern Pikes
- Released: 1993
- Recorded: June 10–11, 1993, Le Spectrum, Montreal and Music Hall, Toronto
- Genre: Rock
- Label: Virgin
- Producer: The Northern Pikes and Rob Jaczko

The Northern Pikes chronology
Neptune (1992)	Gig (1993)	Hits and Assorted Secrets 1984-1993 (1999)

Professional ratings
Review scores
Source	Rating
Allmusic	link

Gig is a live album released by The Northern Pikes in 1993 and distributed by EMI. It is the band's first live album. It was recorded over two nights during the tour to support Neptune. Following the tour, the band would dissolve until reforming in 1999.

The live album is a combination of two "gigs": June 10, 1993 at the Le Spectrum in Montreal and June 11, 1993 at The Music Hall in Toronto. The shows were also released on video in VHS format, but this is long out of print.

The band was supported on the tour by Universal Honey, a band formed by Johnny Sinclair and Leslie Stanwyck both formerly of The Pursuit of Happiness. Leslie Stanwyck joined the band on stage to sing co-vocals on the song "Worlds Away".

== Track listing ==
1. "The Way You Are" (from the album Neptune, 1992) – 6:39
2. "Girl With a Problem" (from the album Snow in June, 1990) – 4:08
3. "Believe" (from the album Neptune, 1992) – 4:26
4. "Unimportant" (from the album Snow in June, 1990) – 3:18
5. "Things I Do for Money" (from the album Big Blue Sky, 1987) – 5:06
6. "Teenland" (from the album Big Blue Sky, 1987) – 7:37
7. "Worlds Away" (from the album Neptune, 1992) – 4:54
8. "Hopes Go Astray" (from the album Secrets of the Alibi, 1988) – 5:00
9. "Why Cry" (from the album Neptune, 1992) – 5:09
10. "Dancing in a Dance Club" (from the album Big Blue Sky, 1987) – 6:36
11. "She Ain't Pretty" (from the album Snow in June, 1990) – 3:40
12. "Everything" (from the album Neptune, 1992) – 3:28
13. "Twister" (from the album Neptune, 1992) – 3:30

== Song notes ==
- "The Way You Are" contains an excerpt from "Connected" by Stereo MCs
- "Teenland" contains an excerpt from "Youngman Blues" by Mose Allison
- "Teenland" also contains an excerpt from "(Ghost) Riders in the Sky: A Cowboy Legend" by Stan Jones
- "Dancing in a Dance Club" contains an excerpt from "Straight Line" from The Northern Pikes album Neptune

== Album credits ==
=== Personnel ===
- Jay Semko – vocals, bass
- Bryan Potvin – vocals, guitar
- Merl Bryck – vocals, guitar
- Don Schmid – drums, percussion

=== Additional personnel ===
- Ross Nykiforuk – keyboards
- Leslie Stanwyck – vocals on "Worlds Away"

=== Production ===
- Recorded by Les Cantin
- Mixed by Les Cantin, The Creative House, Saskatoon
- Digital Editing by Dean Friesen, Cyan Digital Media, Saskatoon
- Mastered by George Graves, The Lacquer Channel, Toronto
