= Bark (Blackie and the Rodeo Kings album) =

Studio album by Blackie and the Rodeo Kings
- Released: July 7, 2003
- Genres: Folk rock; alternative country
- Length: 58:09
- Label: True North Records
- Producer: Colin Linden

Blackie and the Rodeo Kings chronology
Kings of Love (1999)	Bark (2003)	Let's Frolic (2006)

Bark is the third album by Blackie and the Rodeo Kings, released by True North Records on July 7, 2003.

== Critical reception ==
Professional ratings
Review scores
Source	Rating
AllMusic	4/5 stars

Thom Jurek of AllMusic concludes his review with, "Produced by Linden, Bark is the garage band record of the year so far and reveals a band coming into its own with authority, reckless abandon, and a wicked rock & roll grin."

No Depression writes in their review, "The group’s third album, Bark, also owes much to the chops of three frontmen: Colin Linden, with the reedy voice of an openly passionate Lyle Lovett; Tom Wilson, whose nicotine baritone roughs up everything it touches; and Stephen Fearing, straight-ahead in vocal style and languidly soulful in delivery."

== Track listing ==
No.	Title	Writer(s)	Length
1.	"Swinging from the Chains of Love"	Tom Wilson; Stephen Fearing	3:40
2.	"If I Catch You Cryin'"	Stephen Fearing; Andy White	4:26
3.	"Water or Gasoline"	Colin Linden; Kevin Gordon	4:12
4.	"Stoned"	Tom Wilson; Stephen Fearing	3:44
5.	"Lock All the Doors"	Colin Linden; Angelo Petraglia	4:00
6.	"Had Enough of You Today"	Tom Wilson; Bryan Potvin; Davor Vulama	4:06
7.	"Born to Be a Traveler"	Stephen Fearing; Andy White	5:43
8.	"Jackie Washington"	Colin Linden	4:01
9.	"Heaven Knows Your Name"	Tom Wilson; Colin Cripps; Colin James	5:01
10.	"Song on the Radio"	Stephen Fearing	3:25
11.	"You're so Easy to Love"	Tom Wilson; Brent Titcomb	3:55
12.	"Willie's Diamond Joe"	Willie P. Bennett	5:33
13.	"Tie Me at the Crossroads"	Bruce Cockburn	2:56
14.	"House of Sin"	Colin Linden; Janice Powers	3:27
Total length:			58:09

== Musicians ==
- Stephen Fearing – Acoustic Guitar (tracks: 1, 3, 6, 8, 10, 12), Electric Guitar (tracks: 1, 2, 4, 5, 7, 9, 11, 13, 14), Harmony Vocals (tracks 1, 2, 7, 9, 11), Lead Vocals (tracks 2, 7, 10, 13), High String Guitar (track 2)
- Tom Wilson – Acoustic Guitar (tracks 1, 3 to 14), Backing Vocals – (tracks 3, 7, 8), Lead Vocals (tracks 1, 4, 6, 9, 11, 14)
- John Dymond – Bass
- Colin Linden – Electric Dobro (tracks 3, 4, 12), Electric Guitar (tracks 1, 2, 5 to 11, 13, 14), Harmony Vocals (tracks 1, 2, 7, 9, 11), Lead Vocals (tracks 5, 8, 12), Mandoguitar (track 2), Resonator (track 6)
- Gary Craig – Drums
- Richard Bell – Organ (tracks 2, 4, 5, 7 to 12, 14), Piano (tracks 1, 3, 6, 13)
- Bryan Owings – Percussion (tracks 3, 4, 9)
- Janice Powers – Keyboard (track 4)
- John Whynot – Piano (track 12)
- Sue Foley – Background Vocals (track 13)

== Production ==
- Producer – Colin Linden
- Recorded by – John Whynot
- Additional recording – Colin Linden
- Recording assistant – Barry Mcclellan
- Recording assistant – Gene Foster
- Recording assistant – Jeff Elliott
- Bark Symbol Artwork – Tom Wilson
- Design, layout, crown nightlight photo – Michael Wrycraft
- Mixed by – Colin Linden (tracks: 5, 7, 8, 13)
- Mixed by – John Whynot (tracks: 1 to 4, 6, 9 to 12, 14)
- Photography by – Bob Lanois

Track information and credits adapted from the album's liner notes.
