= Bernie Finkelstein =

Canadian music executive (born 1944)

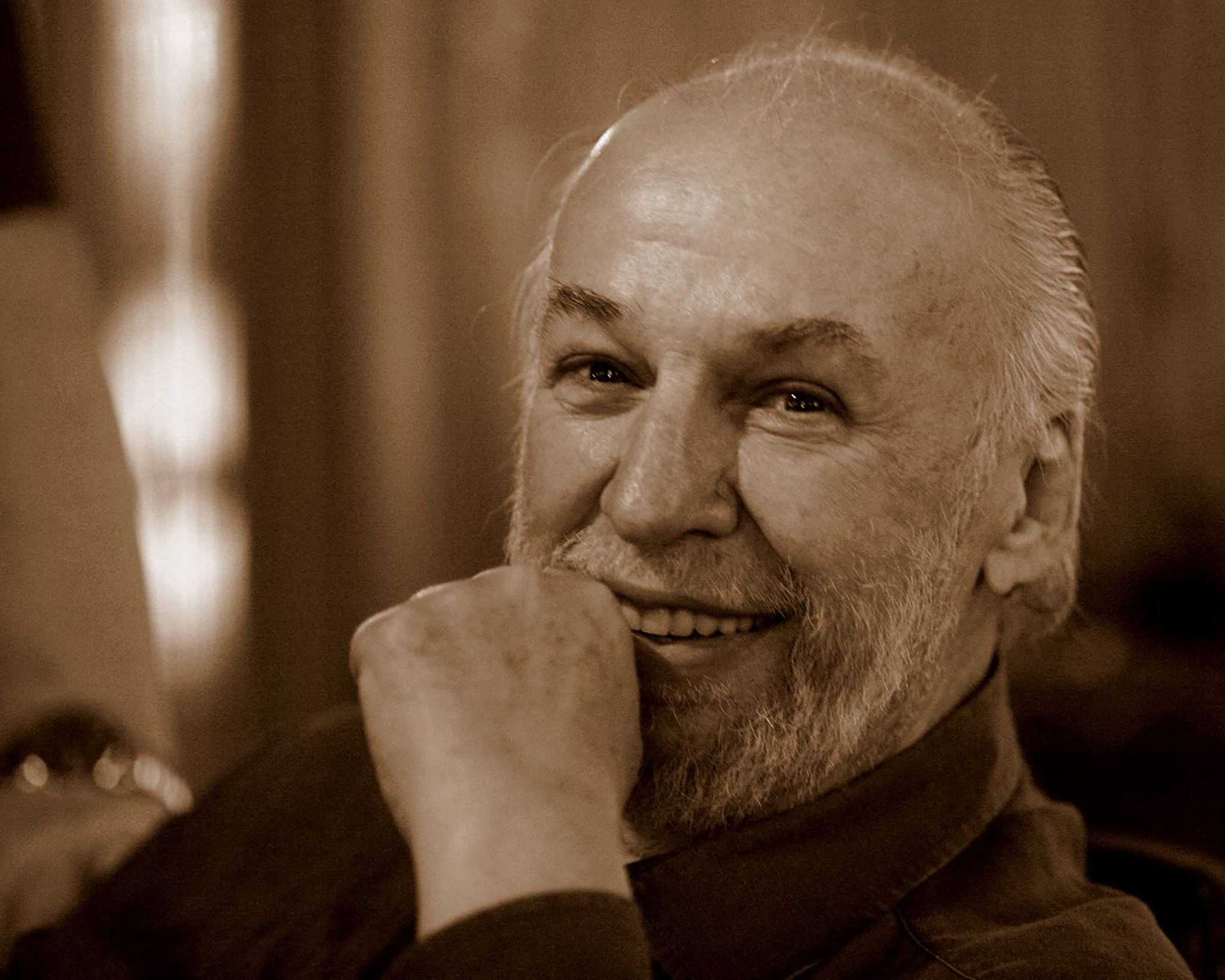
- Finkelstein in 2018

Background information
- Born: August 12, 1944 (age 81); Toronto, Ontario, Canada
- Occupations: Music executive, manager
- Years active: 1966–present
- Label: True North
- Website: www.berniefinkelstein.com

Bernard Finkelstein CM (born August 12, 1944 in Toronto) is a Canadian music executive and talent manager.

Finkelstein began his career in music as the manager of The Paupers from 1966 to 1967 and Kensington Market from 1967 to 1969.

In 1969, Finkelstein founded True North Records. The first artist signed to the label in 1969 was Bruce Cockburn. Through 1972–1981, in partnership with Bernie Fiedler, he managed the careers of Ronney Abramson, Bruce Cockburn, Murray McLauchlan and Dan Hill. In 1970, he and Cockburn became partners in the music publishing firm Golden Mountain Music.

By the time Finkelstein sold True North, the label had released over 550 albums, including records from such Canadian notables as Rough Trade, Randy Bachman, The Rheostatics, Lynn Miles, Cowboy Junkies, Colin Linden, Catherine MacLellan, Tom Wilson, Moxy Früvous, and Lighthouse, among others. True North continued to also release records for acts that Finkelstein managed including Blackie & The Rodeo Kings, Murray McLauchlan, Stephen Fearing, Barney Bentall and Bruce Cockburn. During the period from 1969 to 2007 True North received over 40 Gold and Platinum records and over 40 Juno Awards.

In December 2007, True North was acquired by an investment group led by Linus Entertainment. Finkelstein remained as chairman and long-term consultant. He continued as Cockburn's manager and also managed The Golden Dogs.

Until 2011, Finkelstein was the Chairman of MuchFACT for 26 years, an organization he co-founded with Moses Znaimer in 1984 when it was known as VideoFACT. Finkelstein was inducted into the Canadian Music Industry Hall of Fame in 2003. In 2006, the Canadian Academy of Recording Arts and Sciences (CARAS) awarded Finkelstein the Walt Grealis Special Achievement Award, given to "individuals who have contributed to the growth of the Canadian music industry".

Finkelstein received the Order of Canada in 2007.

On April 16, 2012, Finkelstein's autobiography, True North: A Life Inside The Music Business was published.

On October 10, 2012, he received an Honorary Doctor of Letters degree from York University in Toronto.

In 2012, Finkelstein co-produced the Bruce Cockburn documentary Pacing The Cage with director Joel Goldberg. The doc was well received and later was released as a DVD and has been a best seller on the DVD charts.

On June 22, 2015, Finkelstein was honoured by SOCAN at the 2015 SOCAN Awards in Toronto, where he received its Special Achievement Award.
