= Neptune (Northern Pikes album) =

Studio album by The Northern Pikes
- Released: 1992
- Recorded: July–August 1992
- Studio: A&M (Hollywood)
- Genre: Rock
- Label: Virgin
- Producer: The Northern Pikes, Rob Jaczko

The Northern Pikes chronology
Snow in June (1990)	Neptune (1992)	Gig (1993)

Professional ratings
Review scores
Source	Rating
Allmusic	link

Neptune is the fourth album by The Northern Pikes released in 1992. This was the band's last studio album until they reformed in 1999.

"Twister" and "Everything" were released as proper singles, with "Twister" becoming a moderate hit. The song "Believe" was released as a promotional single, and was a top 40 hit. Meanwhile, "Everything" failed to chart – instead, the b-side "Worlds Away" picked up airplay and peaked at #40 on the Canadian singles charts.

The album was certified Gold in Canada by the Canadian Recording Industry Association on December 10, 1992.

The album features co-vocals by Margo Timmins of Cowboy Junkies on two songs, and the playing of Ken Greer of Red Rider on two songs.

== Track listing ==
1. "Twister" (Jay Semko, Bryan Potvin) – 3:25
2. "Believe" (Potvin) – 4:35
3. "All This Man Can Do" (Semko, Potvin, Merl Bryck, Don Schmid) – 3:52
4. "Worlds Away" (Semko) – 4:19
5. "Why Cry" (Semko, Potvin, Bryck, Schmid) – 3:37
6. "Somedays" (Bryck) – 4:31
7. "Crocodile Tears" (Potvin) – 4:24
8. "What it's Really About" (Semko) – 3:57
9. "Hold On" (Potvin) – 3:58
10. "Chain of Flowers" (Semko, Potvin, Bryck, Schmid) – 5:11
11. "Francesca" (Semko) – 5:10
12. "Everything" (Semko) – 3:37
13. "Straight Line" (Semko, Potvin, Bryck, Schmid) – 6:20
14. "Black Cat" (Bryck) – 3:37
15. "The Way You Are" (Potvin) – 5:15

== Album credits ==
=== Personnel ===
- Jay Semko – vocals, bass
- Bryan Potvin – vocals, guitar
- Merl Bryck – vocals, guitar
- Don Schmid – drums, percussion

=== Additional personnel ===
- Ross Nykiforuk – keyboards
- Jimmy Amason – slide guitar on "Twister"
- Greg Johns – mellotron on "Believe"
- Ken Greer – pedal steel on "All This Man Can Do", guitar on "Why Cry"
- Margo Timmins – vocals on "Worlds Away" and "Chain of Flowers"
- Rob Jaczko – timbales on "The Way You Are"

=== Production ===
- Co-Produced by The Northern Pikes and Rob Jaczko
- Engineered and mixed by Rob Jaczko
- Assisted by Mike Baumgartner and John Aguto, Metalworks, Toronto
- Assisted by L. Stuary Young, Ed Krautner, and Mark Peters, Blue Jay Studios, Boston
- Assisted by Mark Wessel
- Mastered by Bob Ludwig, Masterdisk, New York

== Charts ==
Neptune made its debut on the Canadian Albums chart on November 21, 1992. The album was certified Gold in Canada by the Canadian Recording Industry Association on December 10, 1992.

Chart	Peak position
Canadian Albums Chart	25
