= De Palma =

De Palma or DePalma or De Palmas may refer to:

== Film and television ==
- Louie De Palma, a fictional character on the TV series Taxi. Role of the despotic dispatcher was played by Danny DeVito from 1978 to 1983
- De Palma (film), a documentary about film director Brian De Palma

== Music ==
- De Palmas, 2013 album by French singer Gérald de Palmas

== Persons ==
=== DePalma ===
- Anthony DePalma (1904–2005), American surgeon, humanitarian and teacher
- Dan DePalma (born 1989), American football player
- Gary DePalma (born 1976), American soccer player
- Gregory DePalma (1932–2009), American convicted criminal
- John DePalma (1885–1957), American auto racer
- Joseph DePalma, American politician
- Larry DePalma (born 1965), American ice hockey player
- Ralph DePalma (1882–1956), American auto racer

=== De Palma ===
- Brian De Palma (born 1940), American film director and writer
- Esteban de Palma (born 1967), Argentinian volleyball player
- Joseph-François Charpentier de Cossigny de Palma (1736–1809), French engineer and explorer
- Jula de Palma (born 1932), Italian singer
- Michele De Palma (born 1973), Italian cancer researcher
- Piero de Palma (born 1916), Italian singer
- Rossy de Palma (born 1964), Spanish actress and model
- Samuel De Palma (1918–2002), American diplomat
- Fred De Palma (born 1989), Italian rapper

=== De Palmas ===
- Gérald de Palmas (born 1967) as Gérald Gardrinier, French singer
- Laurent de Palmas (born 1977), French footballer
