= Malcolm Burn =

- Born: Malcolm Burn; October 4, 1960 (age 66); Cornwall, Ontario, Canada
- Genres: Rock; pop
- Occupations: Record producer; engineer; musician
- Instruments: Vocals; keyboards; bass; guitar; drums
- Years active: 1981–present
- Website: http://malcolmburn.com

Malcolm Burn (born October 4, 1960) is a Canadian-born music producer, recording engineer and musician. Emmylou Harris's Red Dirt Girl, produced by Burn, won Best Contemporary Folk Album at the 2001 Grammys.

== Biography ==
Born in Cornwall, Ontario, Burn grew up in Deep River, Ontario and became lead singer/keyboardist for the 1980s Canadian band Boys Brigade. Following the dissolution of that group, he turned towards music production and solo work.

In 1988, Burn relocated to New Orleans where he would work with Daniel Lanois (known for his work with U2 and Peter Gabriel) on a number of projects. Their collaboration began with Burn playing keyboards and guitar on Lanois' solo debut record Acadie. Burn recorded again with Lanois for Bob Dylan on his acclaimed album Oh Mercy, and on Yellow Moon by The Neville Brothers and Living with the Law, which he co-produced for Chris Whitley.

Burn produced projects with Blue Rodeo, Emmylou Harris (Red Dirt Girl, Stumble into Grace), Midnight Oil (Breathe), Patty Griffin, Crash Vegas (Red Earth) and Patti Smith (Gone Again).

Burn continues to produce, record and write music. He is making a documentary film, tentatively entitled Touched, about a group home for mentally ill people in Kingston, New York.

== Awards and recognition ==
- 2001: Winner - Grammy Award for Best Contemporary Folk Album, with Jim Watts (engineer) and Emmylou Harris for Red Dirt Girl
- 2004: Nominee - Juno Award for "Producer of the Year" for "Here I Am" / "I Will Dream", Emmylou Harris

== Discography ==
=== Solo ===
- 1983 - Boys Brigade (Anthem/Capitol Records) - album produced by Geddy Lee of Rush
- 1988 - Redemption
- 1996 - After Dinner Mints (Handsome Boy Records) - under band name: Pregnant

=== Producer/musician ===
- 1982 - Blue Peter - "Chinese Graffiti" from Up To You (keyboards)
- 1988 - Daniel Lanois - Acadie (recorded and co-written/mix)
- 1988 - Crash Vegas - Red Earth (produced and recorded/mix)
- 1988 - Blue Rodeo - Diamond Mine (co-producer/mix)
- 1989 - Bob Dylan - Oh Mercy (engineer/musician/mix)
- 1989 - The Neville Brothers - Yellow Moon (recorded/musician/mix)
- 1990 - Chris Whitley - Living with the Law (producer/musician/mix)
- 1991 - The Neville Brothers - Brothers Keeper (producer/musician/mix)
- 1992 - Daniel Lanois - For the Beauty of Wynona (musician/engineer/mix)
- 1992 - The Devlins - Drift (producer/musician)
- 1992 - Lisa Germano - Happiness (producer/musician)
- 1993 - Iggy Pop - American Caesar (producer/musician)
- 1993 - John Mellencamp - Human Wheels (co-producer)
- 1994 - Giant Sand - Glum (producer/musician)
- 1994 - Charlie Sexton Sextet - Under the Wishing Tree (producer/musician/mix)
- 1994 - Junkhouse - Strays (co-producer/musician)
- 1995 - Junkhouse - Birthday Boy (producer/engineer/musician)
- 1996 - Midnight Oil - Breathe (producer/musician)
- 1996 - Patti Smith - "Gone Again" (producer)
- 1997 - Archie Roach - Looking For Butterboy (producer/musician)
- 1998 - Astrid - Boy For You (producer/musician)
- 1998 - Better Than Ezra - How Does Your Garden Grow? (producer/engineer/mix)
- 1998 - Sinéad Lohan - No Mermaid (producer/engineer/musician)
- 1999 - Emmylou Harris - Red Dirt Girl (producer/engineer/musician)
- 2000 - The Normals - Coming to Life (producer/mix)
- 2001 - Luthea Salom - Out Of Without (producer/engineer/musician)
- 2003 - Rachael Yamagata - Rachael Yamagata EP (producer/musician)
- 2003 - Amstrong - Lack of You (producer/engineer/musician)
- 2005 - Chris Whitley - Soft Dangerous Shores (producer/recorded/musician)
- 2007 - Luthea Salom - Sunbeam Surrounded By Winter (producer/engineer/musician)
- 2008 - A Fragile Tomorrow - Beautiful Noise (producer/recorded/musician)
- 2008 - Kaki King - Dreaming of Revenge (producer)
- 2009 - The Bowmans -The Bowmans (producer/engineer)
- 2009 - Sandrine -Dark Fades Into Light (producer/engineer)
- 2010 - Amilia Spicer - (mixer)
- 2011 - Richard Buckner - Our Blood - (mixer)
- 2011 - The Caught (In the Madness) Malcolm Burn-Producer, Engineer, Guitar, keyboards, vocals,
- 2013 - Gérald de Palmas - De Palmas - (producer)
- 2013 - Jill Cohn - Yellow Rose - (producer/musician)
- 2013 - The Grahams - Rivermans Daughter - (producer/musician/mixer)
- 2014 - Hubertus Roesch - Waiting For This Train - (producer/musician/mixer)
- 2014 - Dan Whitley - Calling all Gods - (producer/engineer)
- 2019 - Ted Wulfers - Tremolo Moon (mixer)
- 2022 - Halfway - On the Ghostline with Hands of Lightning - (producer/musician/mix)
- 2022 - Hither - untitled - (producer/engineer/musician)
