= Things I Do for Money =

- Poster
- Directed by: Warren P. Sonoda
- Written by: Gary R.D. Nolan; Warren P. Sonoda
- Produced by: Emily Andrews; Avi Federgreen; Laura Nordin; Jen Pogue
- Starring: Theodor Aoki; Maximilian Aoki
- Cinematography: Christoph Benfey
- Edited by: Anna Catley; Kat Webber
- Music by: Maximilian Aoki; Theodor Aoki
- Production companies: Federgreen Entertainment; Filmcoop; Shoot Good Films
- Distributed by: Raven Banner Entertainment
- Release date: December 6, 2019 (Whistler)
- Running time: 99 minutes
- Country: Canada
- Language: English

Things I Do for Money is a 2019 Canadian crime film, directed by Warren P. Sonoda. The film stars Theodor Aoki and Maximilian Aoki as two cello-playing brothers in Hamilton, Ontario, who become embroiled in the criminal underworld when a bag of money belonging to a criminal hitman accidentally ends up in their possession.

The film was the first-ever acting role for both Theodor and Maximilian Aoki, real-life sibling cellists from Hamilton who also composed the film's score. Their father, Edward Aoki, also has a supporting role in the film as another hitman; the film's cast also includes Yodit Tewoderos, Rhett Morita, Jennifer Lynn Walton, Dax Lough, Danilo Reyes, Colette Zacca and Ali Kazmi.

The film's soundtrack includes a cello-based re-recording by Jay Semko of "Things I Do for Money", a 1987 single by Semko's band The Northern Pikes.

The film premiered at the Whistler Film Festival in 2019, and was commercially released to video on demand platforms in August 2020 after its planned theatrical release was scuttled by the COVID-19 pandemic in Canada. The film did, however, receive a special theatrical drive-in screening in Hamilton on July 22, 2020.

Faustine Pelipel received a nomination for Best Sound Editing in a Feature Film at the 2020 Directors Guild of Canada awards.
