= Strays (Junkhouse album) =

Studio album by Junkhouse
- Released: 1993
- Genre: Rock
- Length: 56:26
- Label: Epic/Sony
- Producer: Malcolm Burn, Mike Roth, Gary Furniss, Junkhouse

Junkhouse chronology
Strays (1993)	Birthday Boy (1995)

Strays is the debut album by the Canadian rock band Junkhouse. It is the band's best-selling album, being certified Gold in Canada for selling 50,000 copies.

The album was released in Japan.

== Critical reception ==
AllMusic called the album "a more than solid first foray from one of Canada's hardest working ensembles."

== Track listing ==
1. "Jesus Sings the Blues" (Tom Wilson, Junkhouse) – 5:46
2. "Out of My Head" (Wilson, Memphis) – 3:45
3. "Weight on Me Mama" (Wilson, Memphis) – 3:57
4. "The Sky Is Falling" (Wilson, Douglas) – 3:06
5. "Gimme the Love" (Junkhouse) – 3:15
6. "Stone Horses" (Wilson, Junkhouse) – 4:15
7. "Praying for the Rain" (Wilson, Junkhouse) – 3:04
8. "Big Lake" (Wilson, Junkhouse, Malcolm Burn) – 5:20
9. "This Old Man's Too Drunk to Drive" (Wilson) – 2:41
10. "No Way Out of Love (The Rounder)" (Wilson, Memphis) – 4:11
11. "Big Brown Turtle" (Wilson, Junkhouse) – 4:02
12. "This Kitchen Feels Like Home" (Wilson, Tim Gibbons) – 3:57
13. "The Buffalo Skinner" (Wilson) – 4:20
14. "The Waiting" (Wilson) – 4:47

== Personnel ==
- Dan Achen – electric guitar, feedback, vocals
- Ray Farrugia – drums, drums, drums, vocals, percussion
- Russ Wilson – Big Bottom End, vocals
- Tom Wilson – acoustic guitar, woops, wallops, vocals

=== Additional musicians ===
- Malcolm Burn – Dulcimer, vocals, keyboards, percussion, impressions
- Lisa Germano – violin, vocals
- Mike Roth – acoustic guitar, percussion
- Tim Gibbons – vocals, percussion
