= Junkhouse =

Canadian rock band

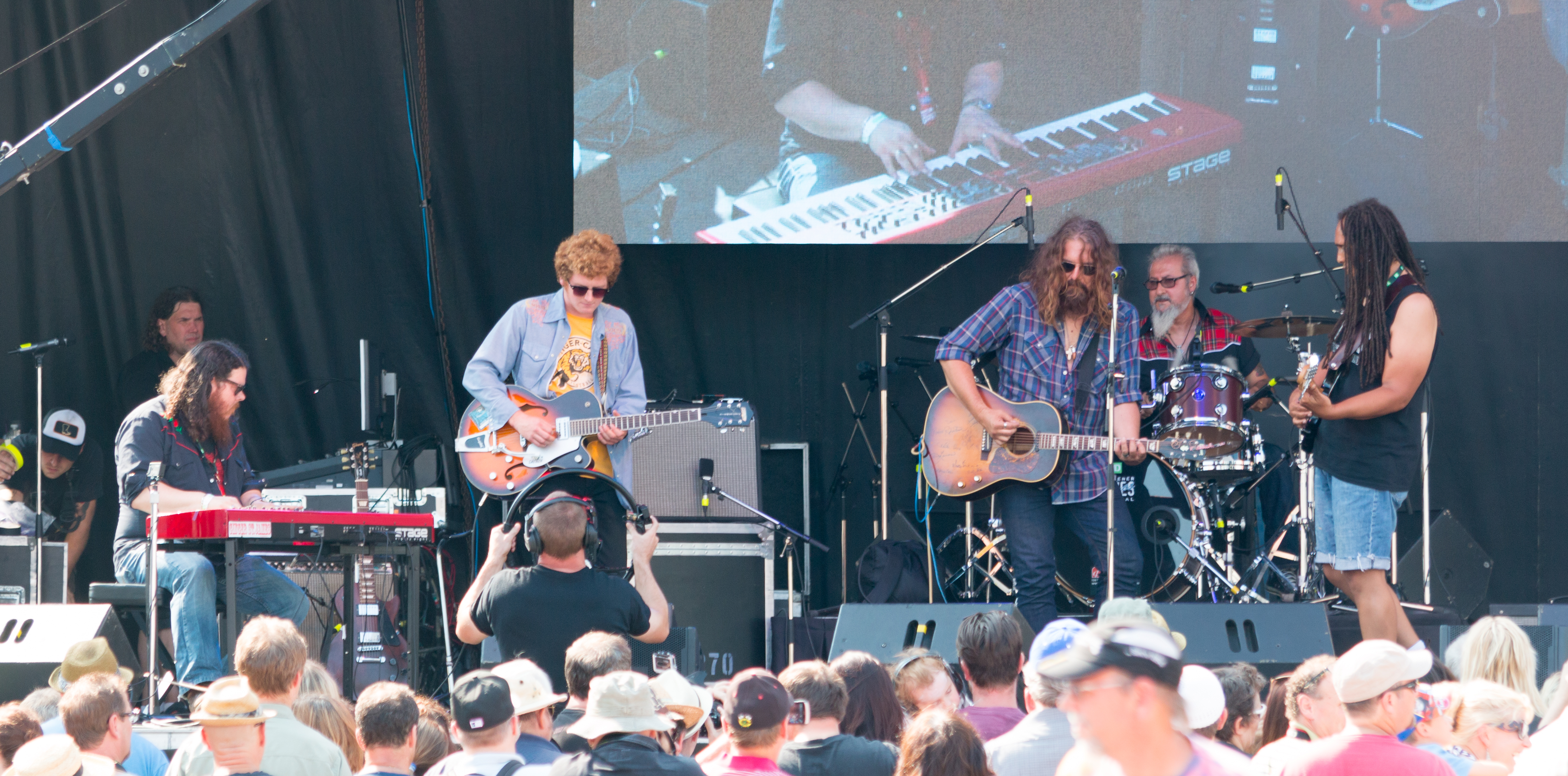
- Junkhouse performing at the Kitchener Blues Festival

Background information
- Origin: Hamilton, Ontario, Canada
- Genre: Alternative rock
- Years active: 1989–1998, 2003, 2006, 2015–2019, 2023–present
- Label: Sony
- Past members: Tom Wilson; Ray Farrugia; Grant Marshall; Colin Cripps; Dan Achen; Russ Wilson

Junkhouse is a Canadian rock band formed in Hamilton, Ontario in 1989. They released three albums during the 1990s, which spawned numerous charting singles in Canada. They initially disbanded in 1998, and have performed occasional shows afterwards.

== History ==
Formed in 1989 in Hamilton, Ontario, the band consisted of vocalist and guitarist Tom Wilson, guitarist Dan Achen, bassist Russ Wilson (no relation to Tom), and drummer Ray Farrugia.

The band got its first widespread exposure opening for Crash Vegas on that band's tour to support their debut album, Red Earth. Crash Vegas member Colin Cripps was one of Junkhouse's early mentors and supporters. In 1993, the band signed to Sony Music, and released a Sony Music publishing demo Here Lies Happiness, which was a collection of their early recordings. The band was then moved to Sony's Epic Records division. In September 1993, they released their official debut, Strays, and promoted the album by touring as an opening act for The Waltons and Soul Asylum. That album was produced by Malcolm Burn, and produced radio hits for the band with "Out of My Head", "Praying for the Rain", and "Big Brown Turtle" all charting on RPM's Top Singles chart. The band was also featured on the soundtrack to the television show Due South. Their cover of the song "Oh, What a Feeling" is the first track on the second of the two soundtrack albums from the Paul Haggis show. "Gimme the Love" did reach #1 on RPM's CanCon chart, October 3, 1994.

In 1995, they released their second album Birthday Boy, which included a duet with Sarah McLachlan on the song "Burned Out Car". The lead single "Be Someone" peaked at #17 on RPM's Top Singles chart, their highest position on the chart. Bassist Russ Wilson left the band in 1996, and was replaced by Grant Marshall. In 1997, Colin Cripps joined the band after the dissolution of Crash Vegas. He played as the second guitarist and also keyboardist.

Junkhouse released their final album, Fuzz, which was primarily written by Wilson and Cripps. Although the band stayed with Sony, they were moved from Epic Records onto Columbia Records for the album. Both singles off of the album, "Pearly White" and "Shine", reached the top 10 of RPM's Alternative 30 chart. Following Fuzz, the band members went their separate ways. A compilation, Rounders: The Best of Junkhouse, was released in 2002 by Sony. Although no longer recording, the band performed together occasionally. They played on a bill with Finger Eleven at a tsunami benefit in Hamilton on February 2, 2005, and reunited on November 7, 2009, to celebrate its 20th anniversary with a concert at Toronto's Horseshoe Tavern.

Tom Wilson released two solo albums, Planet Love in 2001 and Dog Years in 2006. He has collaborated with Stephen Fearing and Colin Linden in the supergroup Blackie and the Rodeo Kings, in which Russ Wilson also guested on their 2006 album Let's Frolic. Tom Wilson, along with Ray Farrugia, also formed the band Lee Harvey Osmond in 2009. Colin Cripps became involved in numerous bands such as C and C Surf Factory and Blue Rodeo.

Dan Achen owned Catherine North Studio in Hamilton. Several internationally known artists have recorded at Catherine North over the past 10 years, including Achen's niece Feist. At a 2008 concert at Hamilton Place, the Grammy-nominated singer held up her favorite red guitar and proudly announced that it was a gift from "Uncle Dan". In 2008, Achen co-produced the Juno-winning album Bring Me Your Love, a solo project by Dallas Green of the platinum-selling rock band Alexisonfire.

Dan Achen died on March 15, 2010, of a heart attack while playing hockey. His funeral was attended by friends and family, including his former bandmates in Junkhouse. On March 20, 2010, Ron McLean profiled Dan Achen and Junkhouse with a segment prior to the Leafs-Canadiens game on Hockey Night in Canada.

Remaining members have reunited periodically, becoming more regular in 2023 with a lineup of Tom Wilson, Russell Wilson, and Ray Farrugia joined by guitarists Aaron Goldstein (Espanola) and "Champagne" James Robertson and keyboardist Jesse O’Brien.

Russ Wilson died at home on March 13, 2024, at age 62.

A new single, Hot Hot Sun, was released on September 24, 2026, under the Junkhouse name. Tom Wilson was the only original member to appear on it - other performers were his son Thompson Wilson, Gary Furniss, and James Robertson.

== Members ==
- Tom Wilson – vocals, guitars (1989–1998)
- Dan Achen – guitars (1989–1998; died 2010)
- Ray Farrugia – drums (1989–1998)
- Russ Wilson – bass (1989–1996; died 2024)
- Grant Marshall – bass (1996–1998)
- Colin Cripps – guitars, keyboards (1997–1998)

== Discography ==
=== Albums ===
- Strays (1993)
- Birthday Boy (1995)
- Fuzz (1997)

=== Singles ===
Release date	Title	Chart peaks		Album
Release date	Title	CAN	CAN Alt.	Album
October 1993	"Out of My Head"	49		Strays
February 1994	"The Sky Is Falling"	50		Strays
May 1994	"Praying for the Rain"	41		Strays
September 1994	"Gimme the Love"			Strays
December 1994	"Big Brown Turtle"	69		Strays
August 1995	"Be Someone"	17		Birthday Boy
February 1996	"Brown Shoe"	80	24	Birthday Boy
April 1996	"Burn for You"	76		Birthday Boy
September 1997	"Pearly White"	46	6	Fuzz
December 1997	"Shine"	29	9	Fuzz
September 2026	"Hot Hot Sun"			Single only

=== Other releases ===
- 1990 Junkhouse (self-released 3-song demo ep)
- 1991 Here Lies Happiness (self-released demo album)
- 2002 Rounders: The Best of Junkhouse (greatest hits compilation)
