= Secrets of the Alibi =

Studio album by The Northern Pikes
- Released: 1988
- Recorded: March – May 1988, Bearsville Studios, New York & Le Studio, Morin Heights, Quebec
- Genre: Rock
- Label: Virgin
- Producer: Rick Hutt, Fraser Hill, The Pikes

The Northern Pikes chronology
Big Blue Sky (1987)	Secrets of the Alibi (1988)	Snow in June (1990)

Professional ratings
Review scores
Source	Rating
Allmusic	link

Secrets of the Alibi is the second album by The Northern Pikes released in 1988. It featured two hit Canadian singles - "Wait for Me" (#58)and "Hopes Go Astray".

Although this was their second album, the Pikes were nominated for "Most Promising Group" at the 1989 Juno Awards. This was likely because no Juno Awards were presented in 1988, the year their debut album would have been up for nomination. They were also nominated for Best Video at the 1989 Juno Awards for their song "Wait for Me". They failed to win either award.

The album was certified Gold in Canada by the Canadian Recording Industry Association on July 18, 1991.

== Background and writing ==
About one year after recording their successful debut album, the Northern Pikes returned to the studio in the Spring of 1988 to record the follow-up. The resulting production had a more serious tone than their first, no longer talking about "Teenland" but themes of growing up and a political awareness of the world at large.

The first track on the album is "Place That's Insane", apparently about a pretty waitress who works in a smokey bar, as the lyrics describe "The girl that works in the club downtown / Knows all about life, man, she's been around". The guitar sound in this track is representative of the live sound throughout the album. A remixed version of this track was released on the 12" single.

The first single "Wait for Me" is a sad remembrance of love lost written and sung by Jay Semko. As guitarist Bryan Potvin recalls: "Our demo process was always an intense thorough exercise and we came very close to some true magic with this song. The demo version was very relaxed and rather melancholy. Another killer chorus though, can't lose no matter how you play it." The video was directed by Ron Berti and nominated for "Best Video" at the 1989 Juno Awards.

The second single was the offbeat "Hopes Go Astray" written by Potvin, complete with a strange video of the band members in household situations in the middle of a prairie field. The song was one of Potvin's first attempts at song writing and dated back to 1986, before the band was signed to Virgin Records. Jay Semko said "I think this was a breakthrough for Bryan as a singer and a writer. I recall the sessions at Bearsville with Bryan singing the break ('Now the princess washes dishes...') as a pretty cool evolution."

The band would tour extensively to support this album, including the opening spot for Robert Palmer's 1989 tour.

== Track listing ==
1. "Place That's Insane" (Jay Semko) – 4:19
2. "Walk Away" (Semko, Bryan Potvin, Don Schmid, Merl Bryck) – 3:18
3. "Wait for Me" (Semko) – 4:21
4. "One Good Reason" (Semko) – 4:47
5. "Blood She Wants" (Semko) – 4:01
6. "Let's Pretend" (Semko) – 4:08
7. "Better Twice" (Bryck) – 3:04
8. "Hopes Go Astray" (Potvin) – 3:38
9. "Stars in the Sky" (Semko) – 3:53
10. "Hole in the Ground" (Bryck) – 3:43
11. "One Good Reason (Extended mix)" – 9:08

Note: The Extended Mix of "One Good Reason" was added to the CD release of the album.

== Album credits ==
=== Personnel ===
- Don Schmid – drums, percussion, vocals
- Merl Bryck – vocals, guitar
- Jay Semko – vocals, bass
- Bryan Potvin – lead guitar, vocals
- Rick Hutt – piano, keyboards

=== Production ===
- Rick Hutt – producer, engineer
- Fraser Hill – producer, engineer
- George Marino – mastering at Sterling Sound, New York

== Charts and certifications ==
Secrets of the Alibi made its debut on the Canadian Album charts on August 27, 1988 and stayed in the charts until December 17, 1988. The album returned to the charts on January 28, 1989 and stayed for 7 more weeks until March 11, 1989.

The album was certified Gold in Canada by the Canadian Recording Industry Association on July 18, 1991.

Chart	Peak position
Canadian Albums Chart	31
