= Snow in June =

Snow In June

Studio album by The Northern Pikes
- Released: 1990
- Recorded: Bearsville Studios, Bearsville, NY
- Genre: Rock
- Label: Virgin
- Producers: Rick Hutt, Fraser Hill, The Northern Pikes

The Northern Pikes chronology
Secrets of the Alibi (1988)	Snow In June (1990)	Neptune (1992)

Professional ratings
Review scores
Source	Rating
Allmusic	4.5/5 stars

Snow In June is the third major label album by The Northern Pikes released in 1990. It featured three hit singles - "Kiss Me You Fool", "She Ain't Pretty", and "Girl With a Problem". The album features guest appearances from notable performers such as Crystal Taliefero, Garth Hudson, and John Sebastian.

== Commercial performance ==
Snow In June was the band's most successful album, being certified Platinum in Canada, their only album to do so. It was the eighth-best selling Cancon album in Canada of 1990.

== Charts ==
Snow In June made its debut on the Canadian Albums Chart on June 16, 1990, and stayed on the chart for over a year until September 14, 1991.

Chart (1990)	Peak position
Canadian Albums Chart	16

== Track listing ==
No.	Title	Writer(s)	Length
1.	"Dream Away"	Bryan Potvin	4:41
2.	"Love These Hands"	Jay Semko	4:12
3.	"Kiss Me You Fool"	Merl Bryck; Jay Semko	4:24
4.	"She Ain't Pretty"	Bryan Potvin	2:44
5.	"Tomorrow Never Comes"	Merl Bryck	4:53
6.	"Shadow of Doubt"	Bryan Potvin	5:04
7.	"Shotgun Morning"	Jay Semko	3:56
8.	"Isn't it Lovely"	Jay Semko	6:19
9.	"Unimportant"	Merl Bryck	2:41
10.	"Am I in Your Way"	Bryan Potvin; Jay Semko	3:46
11.	"Girl With a Problem"	Jay Semko	3:59
12.	"Green Fields"	Jay Semko	4:08
13.	"Snow in June"	Bryan Potvin	5:57
Total length:			56:44

== Album credits ==
=== Personnel ===
- Merl Bryck – vocals, guitar
- Bryan Potvin – vocals, guitar
- Jay Semko – vocals, bass
- Don Schmid – drums, percussion

=== Additional personnel ===
- Garth Hudson – organ, keyboards, accordion
- John Sebastian – acoustic guitar, harp, autoharp
- Stan Szelest – acoustic piano
- Crystal Taliefero – background vocals
- Rick Hutt – keyboards, acoustic piano
- Ian Tanner – keyboards, organ

=== Production ===
- Rick Hutt – producer, engineer
- Fraser Hill – producer, engineer
- The Northern Pikes – producers
- Assisted by Chris Laidlaw
- Production Assistance by Andy Horrocks & Ian Tanner
- Additional Mixes by Hugh Padgham & Bob Clearmountain
