= She Ain't Pretty =

1990 single by The Northern Pikes

Single by The Northern Pikes

from the album Snow in June
- Released: 1990
- Genre: Rock
- Length: 2:44
- Label: Virgin Records

The Northern Pikes singles chronology
"Let's Pretend" (1989)	"She Ain't Pretty" (1990)	"Girl With a Problem" (1990)

"She Ain't Pretty" is a song by Canadian rock band The Northern Pikes, released as the lead single from their 1990 album Snow in June. It is the song for which The Northern Pikes are best known.

The song, written by Bryan Potvin, describes the singer's infatuation with a physically attractive woman and his dismay at learning that she is a horrible person—a "model from Hell". The song was inspired by an episode of Rhoda in which a character says "I'm not really beautiful, I just look that way."

In 1990, this song was the sixth-most played Cancon song in Canada. It is also the band's only charting single in the United States, reaching #86 on the Billboard Hot 100 in January 1992.

== Charts ==
=== Weekly charts ===
Chart (1992)	Position
Billboard Hot 100	86

=== Year-end charts ===
Chart (1990)	Position
Canada Top Singles (RPM)	62

== Critical reception ==
In 1991, the song was nominated for the Juno Award for Single of the Year. Its music video, which integrated claymation and early use of morphing, and which the National Post described as "fantastic", was also nominated for a Juno.
