= Big Blue Sky =

Big Blue Sky may refer to:

- Big Blue Sky (The Northern Pikes album), 1987
- Big Blue Sky (Bebo Norman album), 2001
