= Marcher dans le sable =

Studio album by Gérald De Palmas
- Released: October 2000
- Recorded: 2000
- Genre: Pop
- Label: Polydor, Universal Music

Gérald De Palmas chronology
Les lois de la nature (1997)	Marcher dans le sable (2000)	Live 2002 (2002)

Singles from Marcher dans le sable
- 1. "J'en rêve encore" Released: November 2000; 2. "Une seule vie (marcher dans le sable)" Released: April 2001; 3. "Tomber" Released: September 2001

Marcher dans le sable is a 2000 album recorded by French singer Gérald De Palmas. It was his third studio album, and his most successful in terms of sales. It reached number two in France and in Belgium (Wallonia) and remained for almost two years on the chart. The album was awarded 'French album of the year' at the 2002 NRJ Music Awards and allowed De Palmas to win a Victoire de la Musique, the same year, in the category 'Male group or artist of the year'. It provided three singles : "J'en rêve encore" was the most successful (#7 in France, No. 4 in Belgium Wallonia), followed by the two moderate hits "Une seule vie (marcher dans le sable)" and "Tomber" (respectively No. 30 and No. 35 in France).

== Track listing ==
1. "Une seule vie (marcher dans le sable)" De Palmas – 3:07
2. "J'en rêve encore" De Palmas / Jean-Jacques Goldman – 4:01
3. "Tomber" De Palmas / Maxime Le Forestier – 3:22
4. "Regarde-moi bien en face" De Palmas – 3:21
5. "Tellement" De Palmas – 3:49
6. "Tu finiras toute seule" De Palmas – 3:35
7. "Rien à faire ensemble" De Palmas – 3:36
8. "Déjà" De Palmas – 3:21
9. "Je te pardonne" De Palmas – 3:05
10. "Le Gouffre" De Palmas / Nativel – 2:38
11. "Trop tard" De Palmas – 3:35
12. "Si tu veux" De Palmas – 4:48
13. "Déjà" (acoustic) De Palmas – 6:19

+ Bonus

DVD

1. "J'en rêve encore"
2. "Une seule vie (marcher dans le sable)"
3. "Tomber"

Source : Allmusic.

== Credits and personnel ==
- Acoustic guitar, dobro, arranger, programming, vocals : Gerald De Palmas
- Bass : Bernard Viguie and Gerald De Palmas
- Keyboards : David Berland, Gérald de Palmas and Pete Gordeno
- Drums : Amaury Blanchard
- Electric guitar : Pascal B. Carmen and Sébastien Chouard
- Musical direction : Chiquito
- Photography : Bernard Benant

== Release history ==
Date	Label	Region	Format	Catalog
2001	Polydor	Belgium, France, Switzerland	CD	543973
2004	Polygram International	Belgium, France, Switzerland	CD	543973
2006	Universal	Belgium, France, Switzerland	CD	9841283
2008	Polydor	Belgium, France, Switzerland	CD	9819260

== Certifications and sales ==
Country	Certification	Date	Sales certified	Physical sales
Belgium	Platinum	11 March 2002	50,000	
France	Diamond	2002	1,000,000	1,309,500

== Charts ==
=== Weekly charts ===
Chart (2000–02)	Peak position
Belgian Albums (Ultratop Wallonia)	2
French Albums (SNEP)	2
Swiss Albums (Schweizer Hitparade)	28

=== Year-end charts ===
Chart (2001)	Position
Belgian Albums (Ultratop Wallonia)	5
French Albums (SNEP)	6
Swiss Albums (Schweizer Hitparade)	82

Chart (2002)	Position
Belgian Albums (Ultratop Wallonia)	27
French Albums (SNEP)	19
