= Fuzz (Junkhouse album) =

Album by Junkhouse

Studio album by Junkhouse
- Released: August 12, 1997
- Recorded: Catherine North Studios, Hamilton, Ontario
- Genre: Alternative rock
- Label: Columbia
- Producer: Colin Cripps and Lenny Derose

Junkhouse chronology
Birthday Boy (1995)	Fuzz (1997)

Fuzz is the third and final studio album by Canadian rock band Junkhouse. The album was recorded in the fall of 1996 at a converted church studio in Hamilton called Catherine North, which was co-owned by guitarist Dan Achen. This is Junkhouse's only album to feature Colin Cripps. The album features the hit singles "Pearly White" and "Shine".

== Track listing ==
No.	Title	Length
1.	"#1 Joy Ride"	4:40
2.	"Pearly White"	4:18
3.	"Fun House '69"	3:36
4.	"Superscar"	2:50
5.	"Fuzz"	5:34
6.	"Jet Trash"	2:55
7.	"Flood"	4:53
8.	"Shovel"	2:59
9.	"Boom"	3:43
10.	"Shine"	5:06
