= Un homme sans racines =

Studio album by Gérald De Palmas
- Released: October 2004
- Recorded: 2004
- Genre: Pop
- Label: Polydor, Universal Music

Gérald De Palmas chronology
Live 2002 (2002)	Un homme sans racines (2004)	Sortir (2009)

Singles from Un homme sans racines
- 1. "Elle danse seule" Released: November 2004

Un homme sans racines is a 2004 album recorded by French singer Gérald De Palmas. It was his fourth studio album and his fifth album overall, and his most successful in terms of peak positions. It reached number one in France in its first week of release, on 24 November 2004, and remained for 14 non-consecutive weeks in the top ten and 97 weeks in the top 200. In Belgium (Wallonia), it peaked at No. 6 in its third week on 20 November 2004 and stayed for 53 weeks in the top 40. It achieved moderate success in Switzerland where it reached number 36 and was ranked for 18 weeks. This album was more intimate than the previous ones, with less music, but still in the same melancholic style. It provided a sole single : "Elle danse seule", which was No. 22 in France.

The album title refers to the singer's childhood spent in La Réunion. The song "Elle habite ici" was much aired on French radio.

According to Le Parisien, 650,000 units of the album were sold.

== Track listing ==
1. "Plus d'importance" De Palmas / De Palmas – 4:05
2. "Elle danse seule" De Palmas / De Palmas – 4:10
3. "Au paradis" De Palmas / De Palmas – 3:50
4. "Un homme sans racines" De Palmas / De Palmas – 3:08
5. "Elle habite ici" De Palmas / De Palmas – 3:07
6. "Dans la cour" De Palmas / De Palmas – 3:55
7. "Encore une fois" De Palmas / De Palmas – 3:32
8. "Dans mon rêve" De Palmas / De Palmas – 3:24
9. "Faire semblant" De Palmas / De Palmas – 4:01
10. "Je ne tiendrais pas" De Palmas / De Palmas – 3:20

Source : Allmusic.

== Credits and personnel ==
- Banjo, dobro, guitar, bass, programming, vocals : Gerald De Palmas
- Drums : Amaury Blanchard
- Electric guitar : Sébastien Chouard
- Keyboards : Pete Gordeno
- Assistant : Denis Caribaux
- Mastering : Jean-Pierre Chalbos
- Engineer and mixing : Steve Prestage
- Executive producer and artistic director : Chiquito
- Booklet : Claude Gassian and Sylvie Lancrenon
- Cover photo : Sylvie Lancrenon

== Release history ==
Date	Label	Region	Format	Catalog
2004	Polydor	Belgium, France, Switzerland	CD&SACD	9824576
2005	Polydor	Belgium, France, Switzerland	CD&SACD	9824570
2006	Polydor	Belgium, France, Switzerland	CD&SACD	9824934

== Certifications and sales ==
Country	Certification	Date	Sales certified	Physical sales
France	2 x Platinum	2006	600,000	591,500

== Charts ==
=== Weekly charts ===
Chart (2004/06)	Peak position
Belgian (Wallonia) Albums Chart	6
French SNEP Albums Chart	1
Swiss Albums Chart	36

=== Year-end charts ===
Chart (2004)	Position
French Albums Chart	19
Chart (2005)	Position
Belgian (Wallonia) Albums Chart	42
French Albums Chart	22
