= J'en rêve encore =

2000 single by Gérald de Palmas

Single by Gérald de Palmas

from the album Marcher dans le sable
- B-side: "Le Gouffre"
- Released: 6 November 2000
- Recorded: 2000
- Genre: Pop, rock
- Length: 3:58
- Label: Polydor, Universal
- Songwriter(s): Jean-Jacques Goldman; Gérald de Palmas
- Producer(s): Gérald de Palmas

Gérald de Palmas singles chronology
"Sur la route" (1994)	"J'en rêve encore" (2000)	"Une seule vie (marcher dans le sable)" (2001)

"J'en rêve encore" (English : "I Still Dream about It") is a 2000 pop / rock song recorded by French singer-songwriter Gérald de Palmas. It was the first single from his third album Marcher dans le sable on which it appears as second track and was released on 6 November 2000. It was written by Jean-Jacques Goldman and composed by Gérald De Palmas. It was successful in France and Belgium (Wallonia) where it was a top ten hit.

== Background and release ==
De Palmas explained how the song was created : "After my second album, I tried to compose, and what I did, I didn't really like. I went into a sort of vicious circle. I went to see Jean-Jacques Goldman, asking him, possibly, a text on one of four or five songs that I've composed at the time." He also said that Goldman helped him to regain self-confidence after his period of artistic vacuum. In another interview, De Palmas revealed that he was first tense when he recorded the song, then relax because the text pleased him. He asked Goldman to make some changes to the text, then decided to remove these changes and to restore the original version.

"J'en rêve encore" deals with the "painful story of a broken but nagging love". A music video was shot and shows images of the singer driving a car at night, alternating with those of a couple. The song was much aired on radio when it was released and allowed De Palmas to took up again with the success and to win a Victoires de la Musique in 2002. The song notably appears on the French series of compilations NRJ Music Awards 2002 and on Les plus grandes chansons du siècle vol. 2 and Hits de diamant. It was also performed by De Palmas during his 2002 concert tour and was thus included on his live album entitled Live 2002.

== Chart performances and cover versions ==
In France, the single started at number 41 on the SNEP chart on 11 November 2000 and reached a peak of number seven 17 weeks after. It totalled seven weeks in the top ten and 31 weeks on the chart (top 100). In Belgium (Wallonia), the single debuted at number 22 on 3 March 2001 and peaked at number four in its fourth week. It remained for 14 weeks on the Ultratop 50. To date, "J'en rêve encore" is the singer's biggest hit throughout his career.

In 2003, the song was notably covered by Francis Cabrel, Lorie and David Hallyday for Les Enfoirés' album La foire aux Enfoirés, also available on the 2005 best of La compil' (Vol. 3). The same year, Gérard Blanc performed the song on the French television programme Retour gagnant, aired in May 2003, and eventually recorded as a track for the album named after the show.

== Track listings ==
- CD single

No.	Title	Length
1.	"J'en rêve encore"	3:58
2.	"Le Gouffre"	2:38

- Digital download (since 2005)

No.	Title	Length
1.	"J'en rêve encore" (album version)	4:01
2.	"J'en rêve encore" (2002 live version)	9:30

== Credits and personnel ==
- Lyrics by Jean-Jacques Goldman (track 1) and Raoul Nativel (track 2)
- Music by Gérald De Palmas
- Editions : JRG / Sur la route Productions
- Photography by Bernard Benant
- Artwork by Restez Vivants !

== Release history ==
Date	Label	Region	Format	Catalog
6 November 2000	Polydor	France	CD single	587 870 2
March 2001	Polydor	Belgium	CD single	587 870 2

== Charts and sales ==
=== Peak positions ===
Chart (2000/01)	Peak position
Belgian (Wallonia) Singles Chart	4
French SNEP Singles Chart	7

=== End of year charts ===
End of year chart (2001)	Position
Belgian (Wallonia) Singles Chart	33
French Singles Chart	41

=== Certifications and sales ===
Region	Certification	Certified units/sales
France (SNEP)	Gold	250,000^{*}
^{*} Sales figures based on certification alone.
