= Sortir =

Studio album by Gérald De Palmas
- Released: 16 November 2009
- Recorded: 2009
- Genre: Pop
- Label: Polydor, Universal Music

Gérald De Palmas chronology
Un homme sans racines (2004)	Sortir (2009)

Singles from Sortir
- 1. "Au bord de l'eau" Released: 2009; 2. "Dans une larme" Released: 2009

Sortir is a 2009 studio album recorded by French singer Gérald de Palmas. It was his fifth solo album and his seventh album overall, released on 16 November 2009 (AZ/Universal Music). The three singles off the album were "Au bord de l'eau", which was much aired on radio and number 25 in Belgium, "Dans une larme" and "Mon coeur ne bat plus". The album was successful, peaking at number two in France, on both physical and digital charts, number four in Belgium.

== Track listing ==
1. "Au bord de l'eau" — 3:25
2. "Dans une larme" — 4:10
3. "Rose" — 4:27
4. "Mon coeur ne bat plus" — 3:59
5. "L'Ange perdu" — 3:51
6. "Indemne" — 3:35
7. "Qui s'occupe d'elle" — 3:43
8. "Fais de ton mieux" — 3:48
9. "Pandora's Box" with Eagle-Eye Cherry — 4:05
10. "Sous la pluie" — 3:29
11. "Sortir" — 4:10

== Charts ==
=== Peak positions ===
Chart (2009)	Peak position
Belgian (Wallonia) Albums Chart	4
French SNEP Albums Chart	2
French Digital Chart	2
Swiss Albums Chart	32

=== Year-end charts ===
Chart (2009)	Peak position
Belgian (Wallonia) Albums Chart	98
Chart (2010)	Peak position
Belgian (Wallonia) Albums Chart	47
