= The Northern Pikes =

Canadian rock band formed 1984

- Origin: Saskatoon, Saskatchewan, Canada
- Genres: Rock
- Years active: 1984–1993; 1995; 1999–present
- Labels: Virgin, Scotti Bros.
- Members: Jay Semko; Bryan Potvin; Don Schmid; Kevin Kane
- Past members: Merl Bryck; Glen Hollingshead; Ross Nykiforuk
- Website: thenorthernpikes.com

The Northern Pikes are a Canadian rock band formed in Saskatoon in 1984. The original members are Jay Semko, Bryan Potvin, Merl Bryck and Glen Hollingshead. The Northern Pikes were successful in Canada, attaining one Platinum and four Gold albums in their native country. The band was active until 1993 and regrouped in 1999.

In 2012, The Northern Pikes were inducted into the Western Canadian Music Hall of Fame.

== History ==
The Northern Pikes released two independent EPs before being signed to Virgin Records in 1986, The Northern Pikes (1984) and Scene in North America (1985). They also recorded a song for Saskatchewan After Dark, a 1985 compilation of Saskatchewan-based artists sponsored by the provincial government. Their first album for Virgin, Big Blue Sky, included the Semko-penned "Teenland", the band's first significant hit. The follow-up album Secrets of the Alibi contained three Canadian hits, "Wait for Me", "Let's Pretend", and "Hopes Go Astray".

Their 1990 album Snow in June became their biggest seller in Canada and the US. That album's lead single, "She Ain't Pretty" was the band's biggest hit, and was written by Potvin. An innovative music video for that song received heavy play on MuchMusic and was nominated for a Juno Award in 1991. Overall, the band has been nominated for five Juno Awards, but have yet to record a win.

In early 1992, the band released the single "Everyone's a Hero" for the Canadian Special Olympics. Later that year, the band released their next album, Neptune. The album's biggest hit, "Believe", was written by Potvin. After touring to support the album, they announced their retirement as a group in July 1993.

In 1999, Virgin Records asked the band members for their input on a "greatest hits" package. The band decided to do a short promotional tour following the release of Hits and Assorted Secrets 1984-1993, but found themselves enjoying the more relaxed independence of making their own schedule that they continued touring. They have since released three independent albums, including Truest Inspiration (2001) and It's a Good Life (2003), as well as the aptly titled Live (2000).

In 2005, the band struck up a musical collaboration with Les Stroud. Throughout 2005 and 2006 they performed together live several times. A six-song EP born from this collaboration entitled Long Walk Home was released in the spring of 2007, and was credited to "Les Stroud & The Pikes".

In 2006, Merl Bryck made the decision to curtail his touring schedule, and left the Northern Pikes. Long-time sideman Ross Nykiforuk joined the band on keyboards as the fourth member onstage from 2006 to 2011. Since then, Semko, Potvin, and Schmid have continued touring under the Northern Pikes banner as, in their own words, a "power trio". In 2017, Grapes of Wrath guitarist Kevin Kane joined them for their 30th Anniversary of "Big Blue Sky" Tour, becoming a full-time member of the band in 2018 for the recording of Forest of Love. The 10-track record is the band's first in 16 years and also features original members Semko, Schmid, and Potvin. BlueFrog Studios hosted the band for two official pre-release concerts on June 6, 2019, which were viewed via Facebook Live and YouTube Live. The band released Forest of Love, on June 7, 2019.The band began working on a new album in early 2020, which Jay Semko described as a "tribute to Snow in June'", but postponed finishing it due to travel restrictions and difficulty getting together in studio due to the Covid pandemic.

In 2019, Semko recorded a new version of the band's 1987 single "The Things I Do for Money", in collaboration with cellists Theodor and Maximilian Aoki, for the soundtrack to Warren P. Sonoda's feature film Things I Do for Money.

== Discography ==
=== Studio albums ===
- 1987 – Big Blue Sky
- 1988 – Secrets of the Alibi
- 1990 – Snow in June
- 1992 – Neptune
- 2001 – Truest Inspiration
- 2003 – It's a Good Life
- 2019 – Forest of Love
- 2023 - Time to Time

=== Independently-released EPs ===
- 1984 – The Northern Pikes
- 1985 – Scene in North America

=== Collaborative EP ===
- 2007 – Les Stroud & the Pikes: Long Walk Home

=== Live albums ===
- 1993 – Gig
- 2000 – Live

=== Compilations ===
- 1999 – Hits and Assorted Secrets 1984-1993
- 2007 – Platinum

=== Appearances ===
- 1985 – Saskatchewan After Dark (track "Working in My Head")

=== Singles ===
| Release date | Title | Chart peak | | Album |
| Release date | Title | CAN | US | Album |
|---|---|---|---|---|
| June 1987 | "Teenland" (Semko) | 29 | | Big Blue Sky |
| October 1987 | "Things I Do for Money" (Semko) | 85 | | Big Blue Sky |
| January 1988 | "Dancing in a Dance Club" (Semko) | | | Big Blue Sky |
| August 1988 | "Wait for Me" (Semko) | 58 | | Secrets of the Alibi |
| November 1988 | "Hopes Go Astray" (Potvin) | 45 | | Secrets of the Alibi |
| April 1989 | "Let's Pretend" (Semko) | 66 | | Secrets of the Alibi |
| May 1990 | "She Ain't Pretty" (Potvin) | 6 | 86 | Snow in June |
| August 1990 | "Girl with a Problem" (Semko) | 8 | | Snow in June |
| November 1990 | "Kiss Me You Fool" (Bryck/Semko) | 12 | | Snow in June |
| March 1991 | "Dream Away" (Potvin) | 47 | | Snow in June |
| February 1992 | "Everyone's a Hero" (Bryck/Schmid/Semko/Potvin/Nykiforuk) | | | Non-album single |
| October 1992 | "Twister" (Semko/Potvin) | 25 | | Neptune |
| February 1993 | "Believe" (Potvin) | 17 | | Neptune |
| April 1993 | "Worlds Away" (Semko) | 40 | | Neptune |
| 2001 | "Echo Off the Beach" (Potvin) | | | Truest Inspiration |
| 2001 | "Colour into Colour" (Bryck) | | | Truest Inspiration |
| 2003 | "It's a Good Life" (Semko) | | | It's a Good Life |
| 2003 | "Underwater" (Bryck) | | | It's a Good Life |
