= Big Blue Sky (The Northern Pikes album) =

Studio album by The Northern Pikes
- Released: 1987
- Studios: Metalworks Studios, Mississauga, ON
- Genre: Rock
- Label: Virgin
- Producers: Rick Hutt, Fraser Hill

The Northern Pikes chronology
Scene in North America (1985)	Big Blue Sky (1987)	Secrets of the Alibi (1988)

Singles from Big Blue Sky
- 1. "Teenland" Released: June 1987; 2. "Things I Do for Money" Released: October 1987; 3. "Dancing in a Dance Club" Released: January 1988

Professional ratings
Review scores
Source	Rating
Allmusic	link

Big Blue Sky is the first major label album by The Northern Pikes released in 1987. It featured two hit Canadian singles - "Teenland" (#29) and "Things I Do for Money"(#85).

The songs "Love Will Break You" and "Heartaches Heartbreaks (Open Up)" were added to the album when it was released on CD in 1990. "Heartaches Heartbreaks (Open Up)" was the b-side to the "Teenland" single in 1987. "Love Will Break You" originally appeared on The Northern Pikes, the band's original independent release in 1984 and it was the b-side to the "Things I Do for Money" single. Additionally, the song "Dancing in a Dance Club" originally appeared on the band's 1984 independent release The Northern Pikes, while the songs "Lonely House", "You Sold the Farm", "Jackie T", and "Teenland" all appeared on the band's 1985 independent release Scene in North America.

== Dedication ==
The album is dedicated to the memory of Neil Morgan who played guitar, synth, and vocals for The Idols, an early incarnation of the band which also included Jay Semko, Merl Bryck, Don Schmid, and Robin Billinton.

== Track listing ==
1. "Teenland" (Jay Semko) – 4:02
2. "You Sold the Farm" (Semko, Merl Bryck, Bryan Potvin) – 4:16
3. "Things I Do for Money" (Semko) – 4:48
4. "Just Another Guy" (Semko) – 3:16
5. "Dancing in a Dance Club" (Semko) – 5:35
6. "Jackie T" (Semko, Potvin) – 3:31
7. "Lonely House" (Semko) – 2:46
8. "Love and a Muscle" (Semko, Bryck) – 5:26
9. "Never Again" (Semko) – 4:14
10. "Love Will Break You" (Semko) – 4:05
11. "Heartaches Heartbreaks (Open Up)" (Semko) – 3:53
12. "Big Blue Sky" (Semko) – 5:33

== Album credits ==
=== Personnel ===
- Jay Semko – bass guitar, vocals, piano
- Merl Bryck – rhythm guitar, vocals
- Don Schmid – drums, percussion
- Bryan Potvin – lead guitar, rhythm guitar, acoustic guitar

=== Additional personnel ===
- Barry Keane – percussion
- Wendy Davis – background vocals
- Rebecca Jenkins – backing vocals
- Rick Hutt – keyboards

=== Production ===
- Rick Hutt – producer
- Fraser Hill – producer, engineer
- Assisted by Dave Runstedler

Additional Recording:

- Sounds Interchange, Toronto
- Grant Avenue, Hamilton
- Hypnotic Sound, Toronto

Digital Mixing:

- McClear Place Studios, Toronto
- Assisted by Lou Solakofski, Martin Lee, Paul Shubat

Mastering by Bob Ludwig at Masterdisk, New York

== Charts and certifications ==
Big Blue Sky made its debut on the Canadian Album charts on July 18, 1987 and stayed in the charts until January 30, 1988. The album was certified Gold in Canada by the Canadian Recording Industry Association on December 24, 1987.

Chart	Peak position
Canadian Albums Chart	26
