= Birthday Boy (album) =

Studio album by Junkhouse
- Released: September 5, 1995
- Recorded: Arc Studio, Austin, Texas
- Genre: Alternative rock
- Label: Epic
- Producer: Malcolm Burn

Junkhouse chronology
| Strays (1993) | Birthday Boy (1995) | Fuzz (1997) |

Professional ratings
Review scores
| Source | Rating |
|---|---|
| Allmusic | 4.5/5 stars |

Birthday Boy is the second studio album by Canadian rock band Junkhouse. This was the band's last album with bassist Russ Wilson, who would be replaced by Grant Marshall on the band's next album, Fuzz. The album features the singles "Be Someone", "Brown Shoe" and "Burn for You". The album also features a duet with Sarah McLachlan on the song "Burned Out Car", which is a song about the homeless in Ontario. First pressings of the CD came with a birthday candle inside the clear tray.

== Track listing ==
1. "Chunk (Port Dover)" – 4:32
2. "Big Daddy" – 4:00
3. "Brown Shoe" – 3:06
4. "Burn for You" – 4:14
5. "Be Someone" – 3:05
6. "Caves" – 4:32
7. "Down in the Liver" – 3:19
8. "Burned Out Car" (feat. Sarah McLachlan) – 3:52
9. "Birthday Boy" – 3:31
10. "Drink" – 5:57
