= Joseph-François Charpentier de Cossigny =

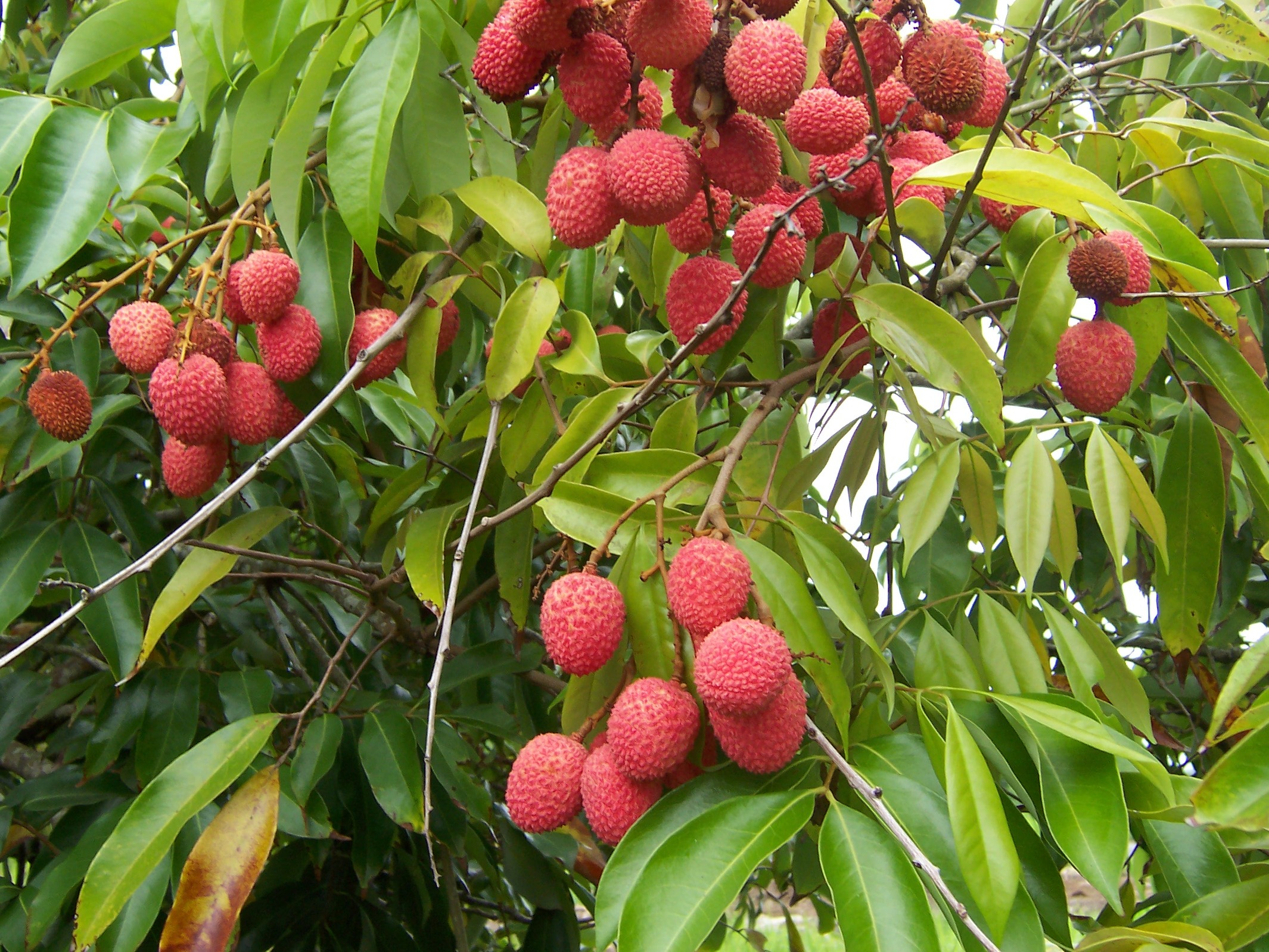
Lychee (Litchi chinensis) One of the fruits introduced to Réunion by Joseph-François Charpentier de Cossigny

Joseph-François Charpentier de Cossigny (1736-1809), also known as Joseph-François Charpentier de Cossigny de Palma, was born in Port Louis, the son of Jean-François Charpentier de Cossigny, an engineer of the French East India Company. He was also the cousin of David Charpentier de Cossigny (Governor of India, Bourbon, and Mascarene). In 1773, while on a visit to Paris as a scholar and politician, he had asked the colonial secretary for the right to establish a Chamber of Agriculture on the Isle de France (now Mauritius). Mauritian authorities considered Cossigny as an "agitator" for seeking the establishment of a representative body which could have interfered with the direct authority of the ministry.

Cossigny de Palma returned to Mauritius in 1800 where he founded a colony called Palma, which is now part of Quatre Bornes, and created several acclimatisation gardens for imported fruit species. He is known for introducing the lychee to the islands of Bourbon and Isle de France in 1764 after several trips to China and the East. He was an early member of the Institut de France in 1795.

== See also ==
- List of gardener-botanist explorers of the Enlightenment
- European and American voyages of scientific exploration
