= Michele De Palma =

Italian biologist

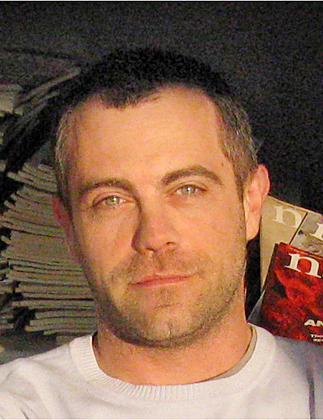
- Michele De Palma in 2011
- Born: 1973 (age 52–53)

Academic background
- Education: University of Turin
- Academic advisor: Luigi Naldini

Academic work
- Discipline: Oncology
- Sub-discipline: Tumor immunology, Angiogenesis
- Institutions: École Polytechnique Fédérale de Lausanne (EPFL)
- Main interests: Tumor microenvironment, Exosomes, microRNAs, Cancer immunotherapy
- Website: https://www.epfl.ch/labs/depalma-lab/

Michele 'Miki' De Palma (born 1973, Italy) is an Italian biologist and a professor at EPFL (École Polytechnique Fédérale de Lausanne). He is known for his work on the role of macrophages in cancer progression and the discovery of Tie2-expressing angiogenic monocytes.

== Career ==
De Palma obtained a master's degree in biology from the University of Turin in 1999 after defending his thesis on the cytostatic effects of type-I interferons on cancer cells. He then obtained a PhD in 2004 in the laboratory of Luigi Naldini, where he studied the effect of bone marrow-derived cells on tumor angiogenesis, and performed postdoctoral work at the Telethon Institute for Gene Therapy in Milan, further dissecting the role of macrophages and their potential use as a target for gene therapy in the treatment of cancer.

De Palma was appointed group leader at the San Raffaele Scientific Institute in 2008. In 2012, he was named tenure-track assistant professor at EPFL, where he was promoted to associate professor in 2018.

== Research ==
De Palma heads the Angiogenesis and Tumor Microenvironment group at EPFL. His research focuses on the influence of the tumor microenvironment on cancer progression. De Palma and colleagues use genetic models of cancer as well as genetically engineered cells to decipher the complex interactions occurring between tumor cells, blood vessels, immune cells and exosomes in the tumor microenvironment.

De Palma is known for having discovered a subpopulation of Tie2-positive monocytes endowed with angiogenic capabilities, and which elicit tumor progression. He later showed that inhibition of the Tie2-ligand Angiopoietin 2 induces tumor regression and inhibits metastasis by preventing angiogenesis. He also identified expression of Angiopoietin 2 as an adaptive resistance mechanism upon anti-angiogenic treatment by VEGF inhibitors in a mouse model of pancreatic cancer.

The laboratory of De Palma explores novel therapeutic strategies to overcome resistance to cancer immunotherapies. De Palma and colleagues notably showed that dual inhibition of Tie2 and VEGF-A promotes anti-tumor immunity and potentiates treatment by immune checkpoint inhibitors. They also identified microRNAs as potential targets to reprogram tumor-associated macrophages and to promote their anti-tumoral immune functions.

De Palma and colleagues also explore the role of extracellular vesicles in cancer progression and resistance to therapy. In 2019, they showed that chemotherapy stimulates the release of tumor-derivered pro-metastatic exosomes. De Palma's group also developed a new generation of cancer vaccine based on dendritic cells engineered with a chimeric receptor called EVIR, designed to internalize tumor-derived exosomes and associated cancer antigens, thus stimulating anti-tumor immunity.

De Palma has also published multiple studies on the taxonomy of scarabaeidae, including the description of several new species.

== Distinctions ==
In 2013, De Palma was awarded with the Leenaards Scientific Prize for his research on anti-angiogenic therapies and cancer immunotherapy. He also received the Robert Wenner Prize in 2017, presented by the Swiss Cancer League.

De Palma received a starting grant in 2009 and a consolidator grant in 2016 from the European Research Council.

De Palma serves on the scientific advisory and editorial board of several peer-reviewed scientific journals, such as Science Translational Medicine, Cell Reports, BBA Reviews on Cancer and Cancer Immunology Research.
