= Colin Linden =

Canadian guitarist and record producer (born 1960)

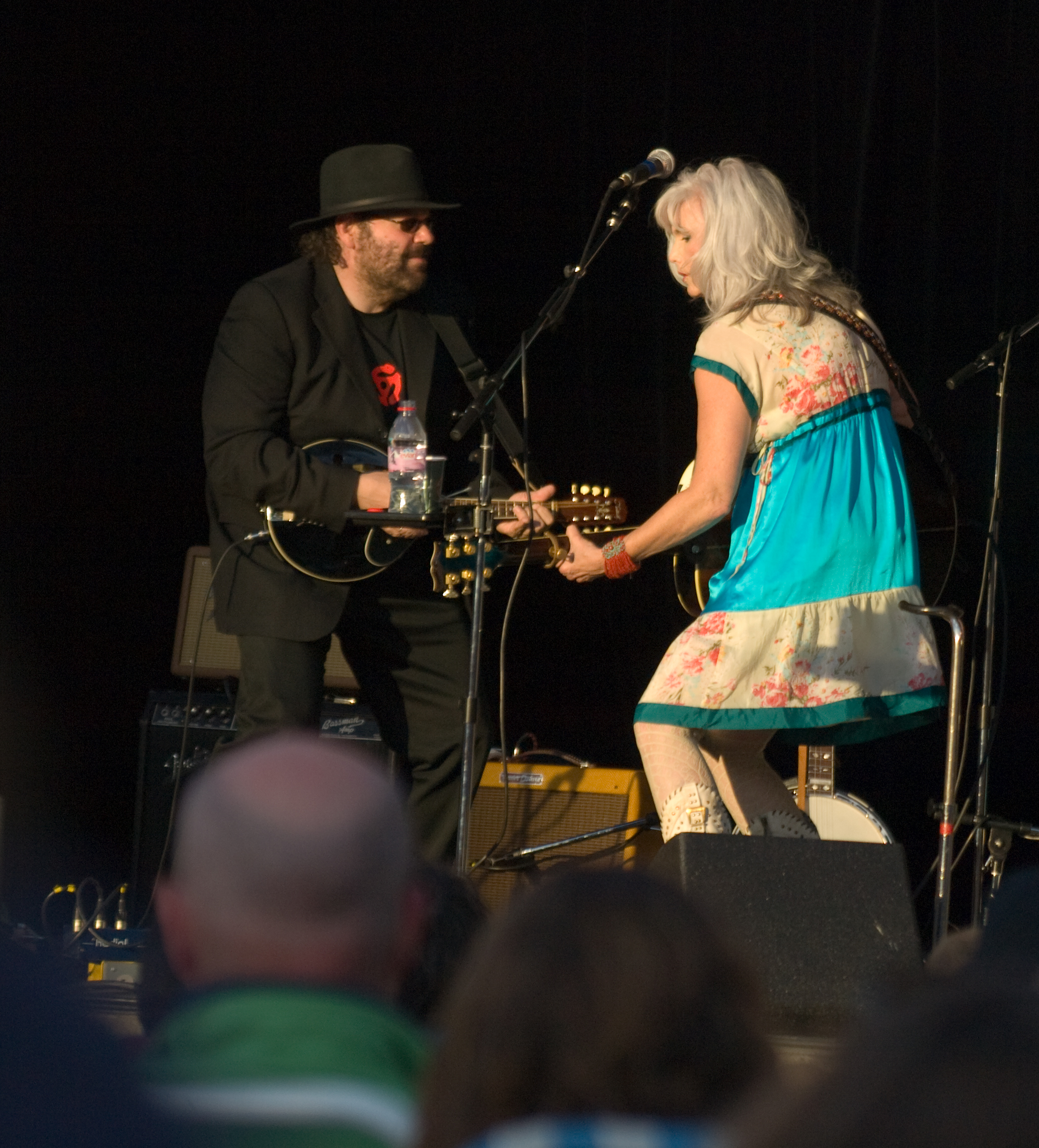
- Linden performing with Emmylou Harris in 2008

Background information
- Born: Colin Kendall Linden; 16 April 1960 (age 66); Toronto, Ontario, Canada
- Genre: Blues
- Occupations: Musician, songwriter, record producer
- Instrument: Guitar
- Years active: 1970s–present
- Labels: Yellow Dog, True North, Compass,
- Website: colinlinden.com

Colin Kendall Linden (born 16 April 1960) is a Canadian guitarist, songwriter and record producer. Linden plays acoustic and electric guitar, specializing in slide guitar, country blues, and ragtime fingerpicking, who frequently collaborates with country and folk performers.

He is a member of Blackie and the Rodeo Kings with Stephen Fearing and Tom Wilson, and has worked with Bruce Cockburn, Lucinda Williams, T-Bone Burnett, Kevin Gordon, Colin James, Emmylou Harris, Leon Redbone, Rita Chiarelli, Chris Thomas King, The Band, Keb' Mo', Charles Esten, and Bob Dylan.

== Career ==
=== Early years ===
Linden was born in Toronto, Ontario, Canada. When he was still an infant, his family moved to White Plains, New York. The ten-year-old Linden heard rock performers in New York venues, such as Van Morrison, the Flying Burrito Brothers, James Taylor, John Mayall, Johnny Winter and Taj Mahal.

=== 1970s ===
When the family moved back to Toronto, Linden became interested in performers such as Taj Mahal, Mississippi Fred McDowell, and Howlin' Wolf. When Howlin' Wolf played at Toronto's Colonial Tavern, the then-11-year-old Linden spent three hours talking with the elder bluesman.

He began performing at a local coffee house, the Fiddler's Green Coffee House, singing and strumming a guitar alongside his two older brothers Jay and Harley. By 1973, Linden began learning how to fingerpick. When Linden met David Wilcox, Linden decided to learn how to play slide guitar. Wilcox gave 140 blues albums to young Linden, to help Linden to learn about blues styles.

Paul Mills, the producer of Sylvia Tyson's Touch the Earth show, at the Winnipeg Folk Festival and an outlet on CBC Radio for acoustic roots music, booked Linden in 1975. At the Winnipeg Folk Festival, Colin met Mississippi bluesman Sam Chatmon, and later that year made a pilgrimage to the U.S. to meet South Detroit's Sippie Wallace. North Carolina's Peg Leg Sam, and Mississippi's Son House.

In 1976, Wilcox had asked Linden to join his band, the Teddy Bears, which meant that Linden had to learn to play the electric guitar. In 1977, he played solo gigs and did his first western Canadian tour, which was booked by Holger Petersen. In Edmonton, he met then 13-year-old Colin James, also a budding blues performer. In the late 1970s, Linden formed his own group, the Group du Jour, which played a mix of covers and a few Linden originals, and a group called the Lucky Charms, which was featured on his first album "Colin Linden Live!!!!!" (1980). In 1979, Linden recorded the Sam Chatmon album, "Sam Chatmon & His BBQ Boys" (Flying Fish Records).

=== 1980s ===
In August 1980, Linden recorded his album Colin Linden Live! He also played as a sideman for Joe Mendelson, Willie P. Bennett, Gwen Swick, Morgan Davis and Amos Garrett. His second album, Colin Linden and the Immortals was released by Stony Plain Records in 1986. Linden has acknowledged the influence of the Band; in the early 1980s, Linden met three of its original members, Rick Danko, Garth Hudson and Levon Helm. Members of the Band contributed to Linden's recordings, and songs like "When the Spirit Comes" got radio airplay and "Miles Away from You" made the rock charts. When the Spirit Comes was released by A & M in 1987. Linden signed a publishing deal with Warner Chappell and did producing for Mendelson Joe, Morgan Davis, Jackson Delta and Hans Thessink.

=== 1990s ===
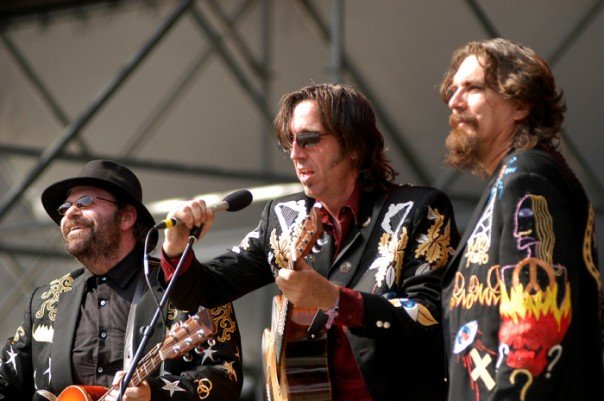
Linden (left) as part of Blackie and the Rodeo Kings (2007)

In 1991, Bruce Cockburn recruited Linden as a sideman, and for three-and-a-half years, Linden played guitar for Cockburn. Subsequently, Linden became his co-producer. Linden's blues album of 1993, entitled South at Eight, North at Nine, distributed by Sony Music Entertainment in Canada, won a Juno Award in the blues and gospel category. Guests on the album included Bruce Cockburn and Rick Danko, Garth Hudson and Levon Helm of the Band.

As Linden got more interested in gospel records, he began taking vocal lessons from Bourbon Tabernacle Choir singer Dave Wall, such as breathing and warm-up exercises. In 1996, Linden won a Juno in the blues and gospel category for his producing Lennie Gallant's The Open Window. Linden co-wrote Colin James's hit song "Real Stuff".

That same year, he joined with Tom Wilson of Junkhouse and Stephen Fearing to form Blackie and the Rodeo Kings. This band was a tribute to Canadian singer-songwriter Willie P. Bennett. After the album High or Hurtin', on True North Records, their second album, Kings of Love, won a Juno.

In February 1998, Linden shared the Maple Blues Producer of the Year award with Colin James. A Tribute to Howlin' Wolf was released by Telarc Records in 1998. In 1999, A Tribute to Howlin' Wolf was nominated for a Grammy Award in the category Best Traditional Blues Album. In 1999, Linden received the Toronto Arts Award.

=== 2000s ===
In 2000, Linden won three Juno awards: in the category "Blues", as the producer of Ray Bonneville's Gust of Wind; in the category "Roots and Traditional: Solo Artist", as the producer of Bruce Cockburn's Breakfast in New Orleans, Dinner in Timbuktu; And in the "Roots and Traditional: Group" category, as a member of Blackie and the Rodeo Kings. That same year, Linden produced Sue Foley's Love Comin' Down and Paul Reddick and the Sidemen's Rattle Bag.

For the album Big Mouth, a more acoustic recording, Linden recruited Keb' Mo', Bruce Cockburn, and other musicians. In 2002, Big Mouth won a Juno for Best Blues Album. That same year, an album Linden worked on, Timeless, won the Grammy for Country Album of the Year. He also co-produced Stephen Fearing's That's How I Walk and Bruce Cockburn's You've Never Seen Everything. In 2003, a third Blackie and the Rodeo Kings album, BARK, was released, and in 2006 they released Let's Frolic and Let's Frolic Again.

In 2003, he had a minor role in the film Intolerable Cruelty as a singing, guitar playing minister and was featured performing Paul Simon's "The Boxer" during the closing credits.

=== 2010s ===
On 15 July 2013, Linden joined Bob Dylan's band for eleven dates until 3 August 2013 [when Charlie Sexton rejoined Dylan's band], playing the first show in Toronto, Ontario, Canada. He was featured on Diana Krall's album Glad Rag Doll in 2012 and Rhiannon Giddens's Tomorrow Is My Turn in 2014.

Linden has been a main musician, music producer, music director and songwriter for the ABC television show "Nashville" since its inception in 2012. He has performed electric, acoustic and slide guitar on most of the show's recorded musical numbers and appears regularly on screen in many of the live performance scenes. His primary residence has been in Nashville since the late 1990s. Linden performed as part of the house band for a T Bone Burnett–produced gospel music concert at the White House on 14 April 2015. Following the end of Nashville, Linden has been a member of star Charles Esten's band and has toured both the US and the UK with him.

== Personal life ==
Linden married Janice Powers on 14 February 1988.

== Discography ==
=== Solo ===
- Colin Linden Live (1980)
- The Immortals (1986)
- When the Spirit Comes (1988)
- South at Eight, North at Nine (1993)
- Through the Storm, Through the Night (1995)
- Raised by Wolves (1997)
- Sad and Beautiful World (1975–1999) (1999)
- Big Mouth (2001)
- Southern Jumbo (2005)
- Easin' Back to Tennessee (2006)
- From the Water (2009)
- Still Live (2012)
- Rich in Love (2015)
- bLOW (2021)

=== Compilation inclusions ===
- Orphans of God: A Tribute to Mark Heard (Fingerprint, 1996). Linden contributed his version of "Dry Bones Dance", originally released as the title track of a 1990 Mark Heard album.
- Johnny's Blues: A Tribute to Johnny Cash (Northern Blues, 2003). Linden contributed his version of "Big River".
