= Stephen Fearing =

Canadian musician (born 1963)

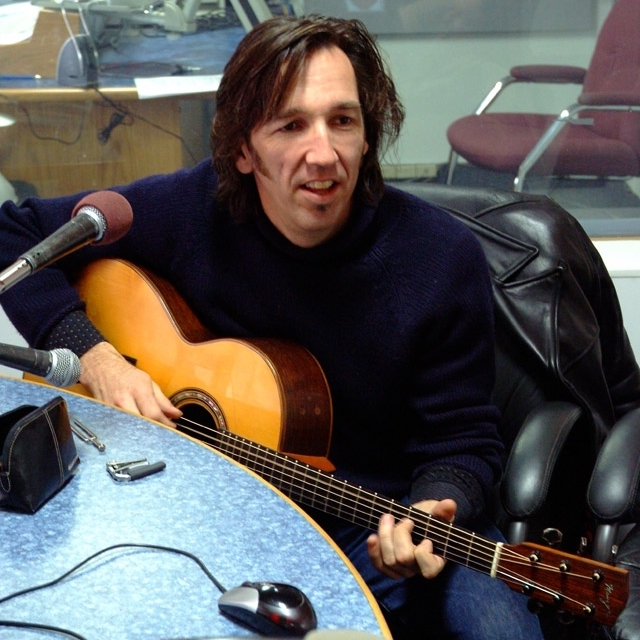
- Stephen Fearing in 2007

Background information
- Born: January 14, 1963 (age 62) Vancouver, British Columbia, Canada
- Genres: Folk, roots, rock, Americana, pop
- Occupation(s): Musician, singer, songwriter, producer
- Instrument: Guitar
- Years active: 1986–present
- Website: stephenfearing.com

Stephen John Ging Fearing (born January 14, 1963) is a Canadian roots/folk singer-songwriter. In addition to his solo career, Fearing co-founded Canadian roots-rock supergroup Blackie and the Rodeo Kings with Colin Linden and Tom Wilson. He is one half of the duo Fearing & White, with Irish artist Andy White.

== Solo career ==
Stephen Fearing was born in Vancouver, British Columbia, and raised in Dublin, Ireland. He returned to Canada in 1981 via Minneapolis, Minnesota, and began pursuing a career in music. Soon after his return, he released a cassette-only, self-titled album in 1986. He was then signed to the Canadian label Aural Tradition. In 1988, he released Out to Sea, which was co-produced by Steve Darke and Fearing in Vancouver. The album was followed by Blue Line, in 1991, which was produced in London by Clive Gregson and features B.J. Cole on pedal steel.

Soon after, Fearing was signed to True North Records. It was also at this time that he began working with manager Bernie Finkelstein. True North re-released Fearing's first two efforts Out to Sea and Blue Line. His first official release for the label was The Assassin's Apprentice, in 1994. Produced by Los Lobos' Steve Berlin, the album features musical contributions from Sarah McLachlan and Richard Thompson. It was nominated for Best Roots & Traditional Album at the 1995 Juno Awards.

In 1996, Fearing joined forces with Colin Linden and Tom Wilson to form Blackie and the Rodeo Kings. Originally teaming up to record a tribute album to the work of Ontario-born songwriter Willie P. Bennett, the band has gone on to write and record original material for a series of critically acclaimed albums.

Fearing returned to his solo career with 1998's Industrial Lullaby. The album features two co-writes with Blackie and the Rodeo Kings bandmate Tom Wilson. It also includes a collaboration with Willie P. Bennett on the track "Coryanna". The album went on to earn a Best Roots & Traditional Album nomination at the 1998 Juno Awards.

In 2000, Fearing released So Many Miles. Recorded by Colin Linden, the album compiles two nights of performances at Toronto's Tranzac and is made up of songs from his catalogue and a cover of Neil Young's "Thrasher", which he had originally recorded for the 1994 album Borrowed Tunes: A Tribute to Neil Young.

For his next album, That's How I Walk, Fearing enlisted the help of Colin Linden as a co-producer. The sessions for the album took place in Toronto and Nashville and featured the backing band of Gary Craig (drums and percussion), John Dymond (bass), Ben Riley (drums and percussion), and Roberto Occhipinti (upright bass). Richard Bell, Ian Thornley (Big Wreck), Leonard Podolak (Scruj MacDuk), and Shawn Colvin also made guest appearances. The album was mastered by John Whynot. Its cover photo was shot by Margaret Malandruccolo and features art direction from Michael Wrycraft. Considered one of Fearing's definitive works, it was nominated for Best Roots and Traditional Album at the 2003 Juno Awards.

His next album, Yellowjacket, saw him taking on the role of producer for the first time on his own. Scott Merritt engineered and mixed the session. The title track was written with Tom Wilson. The idea was spawned following a drive they shared from Nashville to Ontario while taking Yellow Jacket caffeine pills to stay awake. The album features performances from Dan Whiteley (Heartbreak Hill), Jeff Bird (Cowboy Junkies), backing vocalist Suzie Vinnick, Josh Finlayson, Colin Linden, Gary Craig, John Dymond and Richard Bell. It went on to earn Fearing his first solo Juno Award, taking home the 2007 Roots & Traditional Album of the Year: Solo award.

In 2009, Fearing returned with The Man Who Married Music, a best-of collection compiling songs from his back catalogue and featuring two new tracks ("The Big East West" and "No Dress Rehearsal"). Following the release of the album, he left True North Records after 20 years.

Between Hurricanes was released January 29, 2013, on LowdenProud Records. The album features 10 songs written or co-written by Fearing with a bonus cover of the Gordon Lightfoot song "Early Morning Rain". The record was coproduced by John Whynot, who has worked with Fearing on numerous Blackie and the Rodeo Kings albums.

In 2017, Fearing released his 10th solo album, Every Soul's a Sailor. The album was preceded by the single "Blowhard Nation", an anti-Trump protest song which was released in September 2016 prior to the controversial United States presidential election that year. Recorded primarily at Canterbury Music Company in July 2016, the record was co-produced by Fearing and David Travers-Smith. Gary Craig (drums) and John Dymond (bass), the acclaimed rhythm section for Blackie and The Rodeo Kings for over 20 years, performed on the album. Rose Cousins provided guest vocals for the tracks "Gone But Not Forgotten" and "Red Lights in the Rain", and co-producer Travers-Smith plays horns for "Gone But Not Forgotten". The album was named the 2017 Worldwide Album of the Year by Blues & Roots Radio and earned Fearing the 2017 Contemporary Singer of the Year award from the Canadian Folk Music Awards.

He followed up the acclaimed studio album with a limited-edition, vinyl-only release The Secret of Climbing on September 10, 2018. Fearing collaborated on the project with two music industry legends: the album's co-producer and veteran engineer Roy Gandy, co-founder of UK-based hi-fi manufacturer Rega Research, and international mastering engineer Ray Staff.

Fearing has also produced recordings for other artists, including Suzie Vinnick’s Juno-nominated Happy Here (2008), for which Fearing co-wrote most of the songs.

== Fearing and White ==
In 2011, Fearing collaborated with longtime friend, Northern Ireland–born performer Andy White, to write and record a full-length album, Fearing & White. Produced by Scott Merritt at his Guelph studio, the Cottage, the record features thirteen songs, written over the course of the duo's ten-year friendship.

In 2014, the duo released a second album, Tea and Confidences, on LowdenProud Records.

== Discography ==
=== Albums ===
Year	Album
1986	The Yellow Tape
1988	Out to Sea
1991	Blue Line
1993	The Assassin's Apprentice
1996	High or Hurtin’ (Blackie and the Rodeo Kings)
1998	Industrial Lullaby
1999	Kings of Love (Blackie and the Rodeo Kings)
2000	So Many Miles (Live)
2002	That's How I Walk
2003	BARK (Blackie and the Rodeo Kings)
2006	Let's Frolic (Blackie and the Rodeo Kings)
2006	Yellowjacket
2007	Let's Frolic Again (Blackie and the Rodeo Kings)
2009	The Man Who Married Music: The Best of Stephen Fearing
2009	Swinging from the Chains of Love (Blackie and the Rodeo Kings)
2011	Fearing & White (Fearing & White)
2011	Kings and Queens (Blackie and the Rodeo Kings)
2013	Between Hurricanes
2014	South (Blackie and the Rodeo Kings)
2014	Tea and Confidences (Fearing & White)
2016	Kings and Kings (Blackie and the Rodeo Kings)
2017	Every Soul's a Sailor
2018	The Secret of Climbing
2019	The Unconquerable Past
2023	Vejpoesi
2025	The Empathist

=== Production ===
Year	Album
2002	Stephen Fearing, That's How I Walk (co-produced with Colin Linden)
2006	Stephen Fearing, Yellowjacket
2008	Suzie Vinnick, Happy Here
2011	Eric Angus Whyte, Luddite Sons
2017	Stephen Fearing, Every Soul's a Sailor (co-produced with David Travers-Smith)
2018	Stephen Fearing, The Secret of Climbing (co-produced with Roy Gandy)

=== Singles ===
Year	Title	Chart Positions		Album
Year	Title	CAN AC	CAN Country	Album
1994	"Expectations"			The Assassin's Apprentice
1997	"Anything You Want"			Industrial Lullaby
1998	"The Upside Down"	39	78	Industrial Lullaby
1998	Home			Industrial Lullaby
2002	"The Finest Kind"			That's How I Walk
2006	"One Flat Tire"			Yellowjacket
2016	"Blowhard Nation"			Every Soul's a Sailor
2018	"Long Walk to Freedom"			The Secret of Climbing
