= Gérald de Palmas =

French singer (born 1967)

Gérald De Palmas
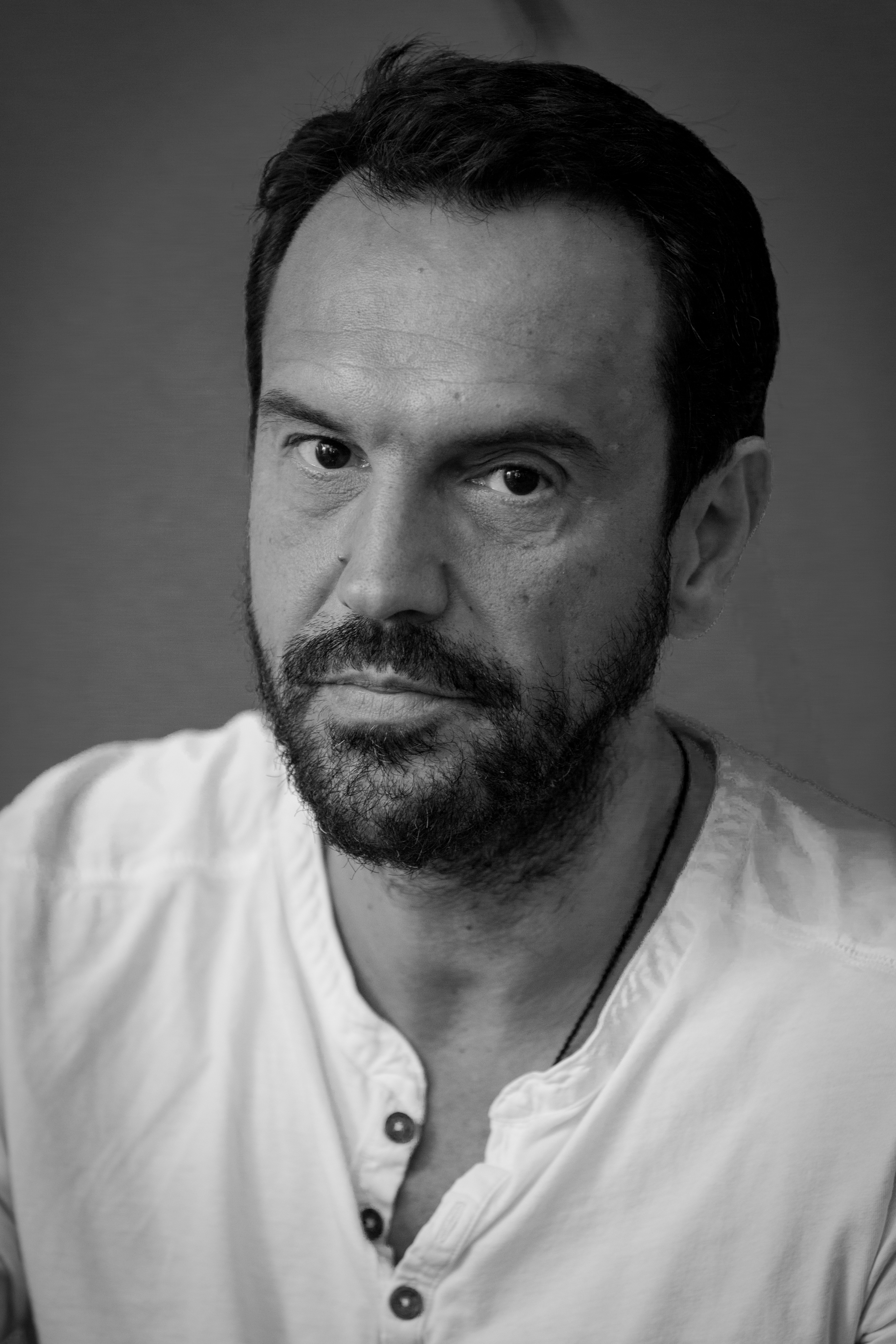
- Gérald de Palmas, 2014.

Background information
- Born: Gérald Gardrinier; 14 October 1967 (age 58); Saint-Denis, Réunion, Overseas France
- Genres: Pop
- Occupation: Singer-songwriter
- Label: Universal Music
- Website: www.depalmas.net

Gérald Gardrinier (French pronunciation: [ʒeʁald ɡaʁdʁinje]; born 14 October 1967 in Saint-Denis, Réunion), better known by his stage name Gérald de Palmas, is a French singer-songwriter.

== Biography ==
=== Early life ===
Gérald de Palmas was born in France. His father was a land surveyor from Brittany and his mother was a French teacher from Réunion. At the age of 10, De Palmas' family left Réunion, to live in Aix-en-Provence, France. At the age of 13, he discovered ska music, and became a fan of the UK band The Specials. Then he met Étienne Daho and formed a group called Les Max Valentin together with Edith Fambuena and Jean-Louis Pierot. They released the single 'Les Maux Dits' in 1987, but De Palmas was uncomfortable with this group, and went solo. After seven years of writing and singing solo, Da Palmas won a talent contest on the French M6 TV network.

=== Career ===
In 1994, Gérald de Palmas, or just De Palmas as an artistic name, released his first album La dernière Année (The Last Year), which contains the hit song Sur la Route (On the Road). He won a Victoires de la Musique award in 1996.

De Palmas released his second album Les Lois de la Nature (Laws of Nature) in 1997. The album was less successful than his debut album, probably due to the dramatic change in his style. He was in the slumps for two and a half years, until 2000. That's when Jean-Jacques Goldman restored his confidence and wrote a song for him titled J'en rêve encore (I still dream about it).

De Palmas composed and wrote 10 of the 12 songs on his third album Marcher dans le sable (Walking in the sand). He was reborn as a star in 2002, as he won the Victoires de la Musique and the NRJ Music Awards, while playing more than 180 concerts. His songs even crossed the Atlantic, when Céline Dion sang his hit song Tomber (falling) in English, titled Ten Days. At the end of that year, Live 2002 was released on DVD and on CD, to commemorate his great tour of 2002.

Two years later, De Palmas returned with his fourth album Un homme sans racines (A man without roots), a more intimate album with less music, but still in the same melancholic style. After having problems with Universal, Gérald de Palmas came back in November 2009 with his new album "Sortir" (Leaving) with the hit single "Au bord de l'eau".

His latest album is "La beauté du geste" released in the summer of 2016.

== Awards ==
- NRJ Music Awards :
  - Best francophone male artist (2003)
  - Best francophone album (Marcher dans le sable) (2002)
- Victoires de la musique :
  - Best male artist of the year (2002)
  - Male revelation of the year (1996)

== Discography ==
=== Albums ===
Year	Album	Charts			Certification
Year	Album	FR	BEL Wa	SWI	Certification
1994	La dernière année	—	—	—	
1997	Les lois de la nature	32	—	—	
2000	Marcher dans le sable	2	2	28	
2001	La dernière année	50	—	—	
2004	Un homme sans racines	1	6	36	
2009	Sortir	2	4	32	
2011	Sur ma route	10	8	—	
2013	De Palmas	11	11	68	
2016	La beauté du geste	3	14	56	

Live albums

Year	Album	Charts			Certification
Year	Album	FR	BEL Wa	SWI	Certification
2002	Live 2002	3	7	28	

=== Singles ===
Year	Single	Charts			Certification	Album
Year	Single	FR	BEL Wa	SWI	Certification	Album
1994	"Sur la route"	14	—	—		La dernière année
1995	"Comme une ombre"	—	—	—		La dernière année
1995	"Sans recours"	—	—	—		La dernière année
1997	"Comme ça"	—	—	—		Les lois de la nature
1997	"Mary Jane"	—	—	—		Les lois de la nature
1997	"Les lois de la nature"	—	—	—		Les lois de la nature
2000	"J'en rêve encore"	7	4	—		Marcher dans le sable
2001	"Une seule vie (marcher dans le sable)"	30	—	—		Marcher dans le sable
2001	"Tomber"	35	—	—		Marcher dans le sable
2002	"Regarde-moi bien en face"	—	—	—		Marcher dans le sable
2002	"Elle s'ennuie"	35	—	73		Live 2002
2004	"Elle danse seule"	22	—	46		Un homme sans racines
2004	"Au paradis"	—	—	—		Un homme sans racines
2004	"Elle habite ici"	—	—	—		Un homme sans racines
2009	"Au bord de l'eau"	—	—	—		Sortir
2009	"Dans une larme"	—	—	—		Sortir
2010	"Mon cœur ne bat plus"	—	—	—		Sortir
2011	"L'étranger"	59	—	—		Sur ma route
2013	"Je me souviens de tout"	130	—	—		De Palmas
2016	"Il faut qu'on s'batte"	44	—	—		La beauté du geste
2016	"Le jour de nos fiançailles"	—	—	—		La beauté du geste

Featured in

Year	Single	Charts			Album
Year	Single	FR	BEL Wa	SWI	Album
2012	"Toi + moi" (Maurane, Le Forestier, Keim, Darmon, Zenatti, De Palmas, Foly, Leroy, Les Enfoirés)	187	—	—	

Preceded by Henri Salvador	Victoires de la Musique; Male group or artist of the year 2002	Succeeded by Renaud
