= Blackie and the Rodeo Kings =

Canadian folk rock/alternative country band

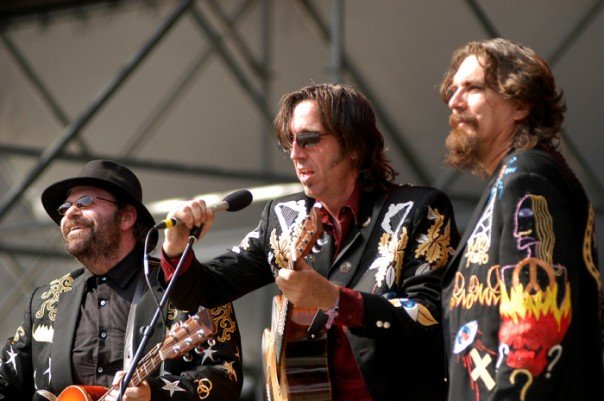
- Blackie and the Rodeo Kings performing in 2007

Background information
- Origin: Hamilton, Ontario, Canada
- Genres: Folk rock, alternative country
- Years active: 1996–present
- Labels: True North, File Under: Music, High Or Hurtin
- Members: Stephen Fearing; Colin Linden; Tom Wilson; Accompanied By: John Dymond (Bass); Gary Craig (Drums); John Whynot (Keyboards)
- Past members: Richard Bell (Keyboards)
- Website: blackieandtherodeokings.com

Blackie and the Rodeo Kings are a Canadian folk rock–alternative country band with blues and country influences. The band was formed in 1996, in Hamilton, Ontario, by Tom Wilson, Stephen Fearing, and Colin Linden.

== Career ==
=== Early period: 1990s ===
Tom Wilson (former lead singer of Junkhouse and Tom Wilson & the Florida Razors), solo artist Stephen Fearing, and guitarist and producer Colin Linden started Blackie and the Rodeo Kings as a tribute to one of their favorite Canadian folk artists, the singer-songwriter Willie P. Bennett. Their name was taken from Bennett's 1978 album Blackie and the Rodeo King. What started as a side project soon turned into a full-fledged band after their first album, High or Hurtin': The Songs of Willie P. Bennett, was a critical success and popular with fans of both Bennett and each individual artist. Blackie and the Rodeo Kings have released numerous full-length studio albums and received many awards and nominations. In 1999, the band recorded Kings of Love, which received a Juno Award for Best Roots & Traditional Album – Group in 2000.

The band originally performed at such venues as the Black Sheep Inn in Wakefield, Quebec.

=== 2000s ===
In 2003, the band recorded Bark. Kings of Love and Bark still had cover versions of Bennett's songs, but they also included some original material by the band members and cover versions of songs by Bruce Cockburn, Fred Eaglesmith and David Wiffen. In 2005, the band was included in a list published by the New York Times of songs found on President George W. Bush's iPod. In 2006, the band recorded Let's Frolic!, consisting of all-original material.

In 2008, the band were the winners of the 7th annual Independent Music Awards Vox Pop vote for best band venue poster. It was designed by Michael Wrycraft.

In 2009, the compilation album Swinging from the Chains of Love was released, which included the previously unreleased "Caves of Jericho" and a cover of Johnny Cash's "Folsom Prison Blues".

For their 2011 album, Kings and Queens, the band teamed up with singers Emmylou Harris, Pam Tillis, Lucinda Williams, Rosanne Cash, Cassandra Wilson, Serena Ryder and Patti Scialfa. Each of the 14 tracks featured a duet with one of the singers. The band then went out on tour in support of the album. In 2012, they performed at the Calgary Folk Music Festival.

In 2014, the band released the album South, which was made up of new, original songs, as well a cover of Willie P. Bennett's "Driftin' Snow."

Their 2017 album, Kings and Kings, revisited the format of their 2011 album, Kings and Queens, this time pairing the band with different guest male vocalists. Contributing to the album were Eric Church, City and Colour, Bruce Cockburn, Rodney Crowell, Vince Gill, Jason Isbell, Nick Lowe, Raul Malo (of The Mavericks), The Men of Nashville, Buddy Miller, Keb' Mo', and Fantastic Negrito.

== Accompanying musicians ==
John Dymond, Bassist for Blackie and the Rodeo Kings and other well-known Canadian artists, such as Amanda Wilkinson, the Wilkinsons, k.d. lang and Bruce Cockburn.

Gary Craig: Drummer and percussionist for Blackie and the Rodeo Kings. He has performed with numerous Canadian musicians, from Anne Murray to Terri Clark.

Richard Bell (March 5, 1946, Toronto – June 15, 2007, Toronto): Pianist for Janis Joplin and The Band. He was the keyboardist for Blackie and the Rodeo Kings for a number of years before his death.

Janice Powers has handled occasional keyboard duties as well as various production assistance roles on several albums, and the band has recorded several of her songs. She is also the wife of Colin Linden.

John Whynot, who has played with many folk and roots artists, and who has recorded occasionally with the band since their first album now handles keyboard duties.

== Discography ==
=== Albums ===
==== Studio albums ====
Year	Album	Label
1996	High or Hurtin': The Songs of Willie P. Bennett	True North
1999	Kings of Love	True North
2003	Bark	True North
2006	Let's Frolic	True North
2007	Let's Frolic Again	True North
2011	Kings and Queens	File Under: Music
2014	South	File Under: Music
2017	Kings and Kings	File Under: Music
2020	King of This Town	Warner Music
2022	Oh Glory	Warner Music Canada

==== Compilation album ====
Year	Album	Label
2009	Swinging from the Chains of Love	File Under: Music

=== Singles ===
Year	Single	Chart Positions		Album
Year	Single	CAN Country	CAN Rock	Album
1996	"Lace & Pretty Flowers"	94		High or Hurtin'
1997	"White Line"			High or Hurtin'
1999	"The Lucky Ones"	82		Kings of Love
1999	"Lean on Your Peers"		19	Kings of Love
2003	"Swinging from the Chains of Love"			Bark
2003	"Had Enough of You Today"			Bark
2004	"Water or Gasoline"			Bark
2004	"You're So Easy to Love"			Bark
2006	"That's What I Like"			Let's Frolic
2007	"The Fool Who Can't Forget"			Let's Frolic
2007	"Buried in Your Heart"			Let's Frolic
2011	"Got You Covered" (with Rosanne Cash)			Kings and Queens
2019	"Cold 100"			King of This Town

== Contributions to other recordings ==
- Borrowed Tunes II: A Tribute to Neil Young includes the band's cover version of "Unknown Legend". All proceeds from this album go to Safe Haven and the Bridge School.
- Weirdsville Soundtrack features their song "Stoned", from the album Bark (2003).
- Johnny's Blues: A Tribute to Johnny Cash (NorthernBlues Music, 2003) includes the band's cover version of "Folsom Prison Blues".
- Beautiful: A Tribute to Gordon Lightfoot includes the band's cover version of "Summer Side of Love".
