= Tom Wilson (musician) =

Musical artist (born 1959)

Tom Wilson Tehoh'ahake CM
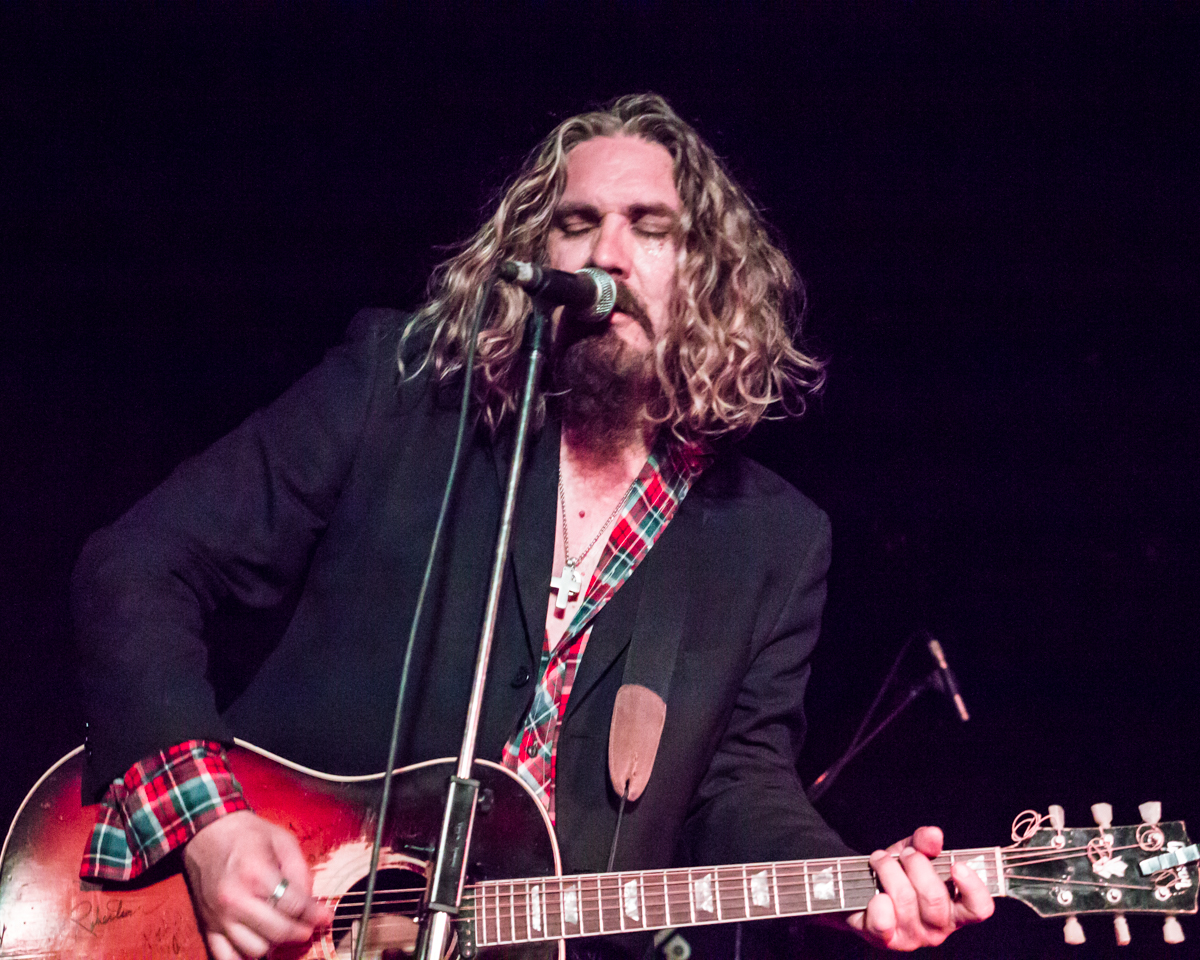
- Tom Wilson performing at the Haven Social Club in Edmonton, Alberta, Canada

Background information
- Also known as: Lee Harvey Osmond
- Born: Thomas Cunningham Wilson; 1959 (age 66–67); Hamilton, Ontario, Canada
- Origin: Hamilton, Ontario, Canada
- Genres: Blues, rock, psychedelic folk, folk, Americana
- Occupations: Musician, songwriter, artist
- Instrument: Guitar
- Years active: 1980s–present
- Member of: Blackie and the Rodeo Kings
- Formerly of: Junkhouse; Lee Harvey Osmond; Florida Razors
- Website: Tom Wilson

Thomas Lazare Wilson CM (born 1959) is a Canadian rock musician from Hamilton, Ontario. A veteran of the Canadian music scene, Wilson has been a writer and performer for many years. Wilson's eclectic musical style has ranged from the psychobilly/R&B sounds of the Florida Razors, to the western/roots style of Blackie and the Rodeo Kings and the funk/blues-inspired rock of Junkhouse.

== Early life ==
Wilson grew up in Hamilton, Ontario, secretly adopted and raised by his French Canadian great-aunt Bunny Wilson and his Irish Canadian great-uncle George Wilson, as part of the Sixties Scoop. Later in life Tom discovered his birth parents, Louis Beauvais and Jane Lazare, both Mohawk from Kahnawake. Tom did not confirm his Mohawk identity until he was an adult. Wilson discovered the truth about his adoption by chance: a speaking tour handler who had been an old friend of his great-aunt mentioned she had been there the day he was adopted.

== Career ==
Tom Wilson's first performing band was The Florida Razors, formed in 1981 with guitarist Jason Avery, guitarist Bruce Cameron, bassist Steven Toth, and drummer Greg Cannon. Steven Toth and Bruce Cameron left the band in 1982 and Carl Keesee joined on bass. They released one full-length album, Beat Music, in 1986 but dissolved in 1987.

In the 1990s, Wilson fronted the band Junkhouse. Junkhouse released three studio albums and a number of singles.

In 1996, he joined with Colin Linden, Stephen Fearing to form the roots rock trio Blackie and the Rodeo Kings.

In 1999, Wilson performed solo as part of The White Ribbon Concert at the Phoenix Concert Theatre in Toronto.

In 2001, Wilson released a solo album, Planet Love. The album featured the single "Dig It", which reached #11 on Canada's Rock chart. In 2006, he released his second solo album, Dog Years. In between the release of both solo albums, he partnered up with Daniel Lanois's older brother, Bob Lanois, to record The Shack Recordings Volume 1, a collection of quieter acoustic songs with Bob Lanois recording and accompanying him on blues harp on some songs.

It was around this time Wilson and comedian Cathy Jones met and became engaged. They split their time between Hamilton and Nova Scotia, though they never married.

In 2011, he toured with Blackie and the Rodeo Kings in support of their album Kings and Queens. That year he performed at the Winnipeg Folk Festival.

In 2015, Wilson was commissioned by the city of Hamilton to paint a mural depicting the history of music in the city.

Wilson's most recent project is Lee Harvey Osmond, which is a collaborative effort with members of Cowboy Junkies and Skydiggers.

His songs have been performed by Mavis Staples, Colin James, Stephen Fearing, Adam Gregory, Billy Ray Cyrus, Craig Northey, David Ricketts, and Edwin. Numerous Wilson songs have been used in television, commercials and motion pictures.

In 2017, Wilson published a memoir of his life to date, titled Beautiful Scars. The memoir addressed his discovery of his Mohawk heritage, which he also addressed musically for the first time on Lee Harvey Osmond's 2019 album Mohawk. In 2022, he released Mother Love, a collaborative album with iskwē.

He was the subject of Shane Belcourt's 2022 documentary film Beautiful Scars, which premiered at the 2022 Hot Docs Canadian International Documentary Festival.

Wilson was appointed as a Member of the Order of Canada in June 2023, with this citation: For his multifaceted contributions to the arts in Canada, notably as an iconic musician, as well as for his advocacy of Indigenous communities in Canada.

In 2024, McMaster University announced that Wilson will be awarded an honorary degree.

In recent years he has also collaborated with his son, Thompson Wilson, on music released under the name Tehohàhake, including the score for Belcourt's 2025 documentary film Ni-Naadamaadiz: Red Power Rising.

== Personal life ==
In the mid-1980s, Wilson met Sandy Shaw while performing in a Kingston, Ontario bar. They began a relationship and, in 1989, moved to Hamilton. The couple married in 1995 after having two children. The couple divorced in the early 2000s, though remained close, with Wilson performing at a campaign fundraiser for Shaw when she ran for municipal office in Hamilton in 2014.

In 2006, Wilson was engaged to comedian Cathy Jones. However, they were never married.

Wilson's son, Thompson Wilson Shaw, is also a musician, formerly part of the folk-rock group Harlan Pepper. They would occasionally tour together, and Harlan Pepper opened for Blackie and the Rodeo Kings on some of their concerts. Wilson's daughter, Madeline Wilson Shaw, worked as a music promoter and political staffer with the Ontario NDP.

Since 2015, Wilson has been in a relationship with Margot Burnell.
