= Bryan Potvin =

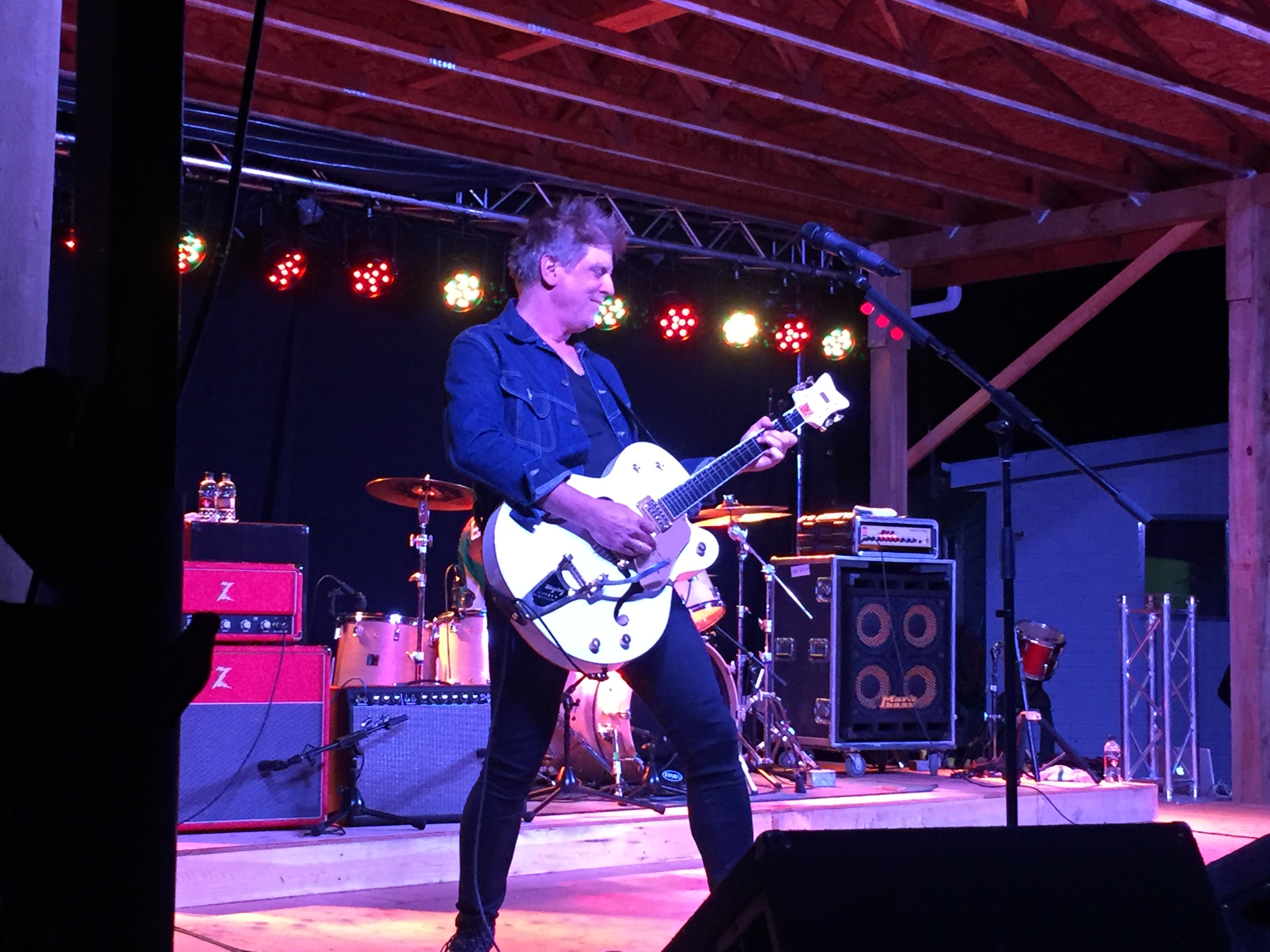
- Performing live in Saskatchewan; August 19, 2016

Background information
- Born: Bryan Anthony Potvin; May 31, 1963 (age 63)
- Occupations: Singer, songwriter, guitarist
- Instrument: Electric Guitar
- Member of: The Northern Pikes

Bryan Anthony Potvin (born May 31, 1963, in Ottawa) is a Canadian singer-songwriter and guitarist.

== History ==
Potvin began guitar lessons at the age of 13 in Victoria, British Columbia. His family re-located to Saskatoon, Saskatchewan, where he continued his music studies. In 1984, Bryan, along with Jay Semko, Don Schmid and Merl Bryck formed The Northern Pikes. The band signed a world-wide recording contract with Virgin Records in the winter of 1986. Their seven-album catalogue sold in excess of 1 million units globally and garnered the band eight Juno Award nominations. In 1993, the group took a six-year hiatus, citing fatigue. With fellow band member Jay Semko, Potvin co-wrote the theme for the television series Due South.

From 1994 to 2000, Potvin was the A&R manager for PolyGram in Canada. Potvin released his first solo recording project, Heartbreakthrough, in July 2000. The song "Read Between The Lines" was nominated for Best New Rock/Alternative Recording at the Canadian Radio Music Awards. The Northern Pikes re-united shortly afterwards to begin touring a greatest hits collection issued by Virgin Records. The band recorded three independent albums: Live 2000, Truest Inspiration, and It's A Good Life between 2000 and 2003.

In 2004, Potvin signed a music publishing agreement with BMG, writing songs for artists such as Andrea England, Joanna Wang, Hayley Aitken, Blackie & The Rodeo Kings, Mink, Doc Walker, Christa Borden, Velvet Empire and several others.

From 2009 and 2012, Potvin wrote and recorded music for two Discovery Channel series, Beyond Survival and Survivorman 10. Potvin travelled to Sri Lanka, Namibia, Madagascar and several other countries recording traditional music, weaving this into the soundtrack for the shows.

Potvin's solo album Heartbledwhite was released in 2014.

== Personal life ==
Potvin lives in Nova Scotia.
