= Jay Semko =

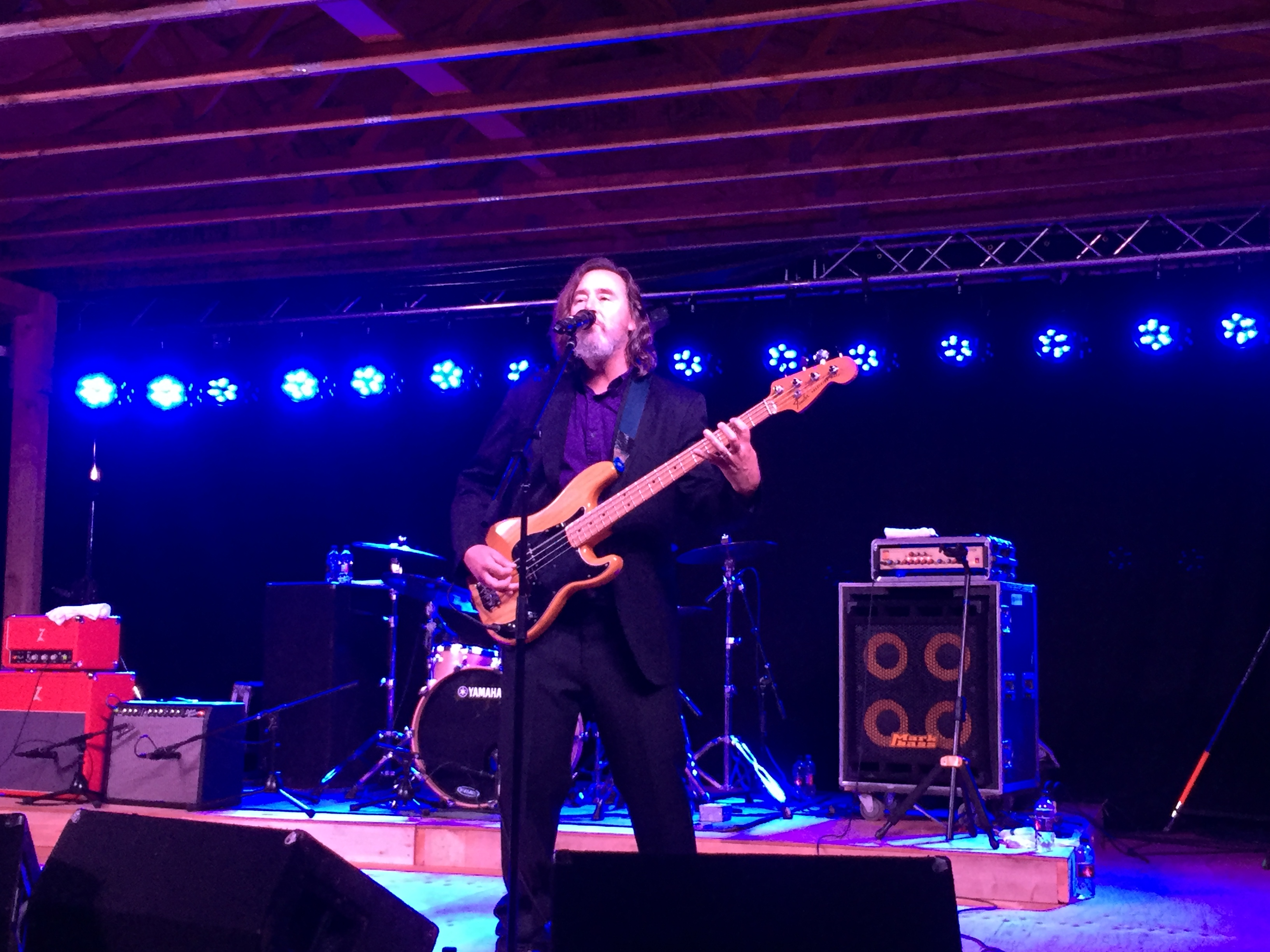
- Jay Semko performing live in Saskatchewan. 19 August 2016

Background information
- Born: John Peter Semko
- Occupations: Singer, songwriter, bassist
- Instruments: Vocals, bass guitar, piano
- Years active: 1982–present
- Member of: The Northern Pikes
- Website: www.jaysemko.com

John Peter "Jay" Semko is a singer/songwriter and bassist with Canadian band, The Northern Pikes. He is also a music composer for numerous film and television productions, most notably the successful Canadian television series Due South. Semko has been nominated for a Juno Award eight times as a member of the Northern Pikes, and also been nominated twice for a Gemini Award, and once for a Canadian Screen Award, and received two awards from the Canadian Music Publishers Association for his songwriting. His hometown is Saskatoon, Saskatchewan.

== Discography ==
=== Albums ===
| Year | Album |
|---|---|
| 1995 | Mouse |
| 2005 | Love Will Set You Free (EP) |
| 2006 | Redberry |
| 2006 | Merry Christmas |
| 2007 | Live at the Royal Saskatchewan Museum |
| 2008 | International Superstar |
| 2010 | Jay Semko |
| 2011 | Force of Horses (EP) |
| 2012 | Sending Love |
| 2014 | Flora Vista |
| 2018 | Never Sent |

=== Singles ===
| Year | Single | Chart Positions | | Album |
| Year | Single | CAN AC | CAN | Album |
|---|---|---|---|---|
| 1995 | "Strawberry Girl" | 22 | — | Mouse |
| 1996 | "Times Change" | — | 36 | Mouse |
| 2008 | "She Won't Be Lonely Long" | — | — | International Superstar |
| 2010 | "Comeback Kid" | — | — | Jay Semko |
| 2010 | "Let's Wake Up the Moon" | — | — | Jay Semko |
| 2011 | "Nobody's Watching" | — | — | Jay Semko |
| 2011 | "That Kind of Blue" | — | — | Jay Semko |
| 2011 | "Party in the Parking Lot" | — | — | Force of Horses |
| 2012 | "Big Feet Big Shoes" | — | — | Force of Horses |
| 2013 | "Come Get a Little Love" | — | — | Sending Love |
| 2013 | "Harmony" | — | — | Sending Love |
| 2015 | "Only Sometimes" (with Leslie Stanwyck) | — | — | Flora Vista |
