= Blue Rodeo discography =

- Studio albums: 16
- Live albums: 4
- Compilation albums: 1
- Singles: 58
- Box sets: 1

This is a discography for Canadian country rock group Blue Rodeo.

== Albums ==
=== Studio albums ===
==== 1980s albums ====
Title	Details	Peak chart positions		Certifications (sales thresholds)
Title	Details	CAN Country	CAN	Certifications (sales thresholds)
Outskirts	Release date: March 1987; Label: Risque Disque	—	20	CAN: 4× Platinum
Diamond Mine	Release date: March 20, 1989; Label: Risque Disque	2	4	CAN: 3× Platinum
"—" denotes releases that did not chart

==== 1990s albums ====
Title	Details	Peak chart positions		Certifications (sales thresholds)
Title	Details	CAN Country	CAN	Certifications (sales thresholds)
Casino	Release date: November 20, 1990; Label: Risque Disque	—	6	CAN: 2× Platinum
Lost Together	Release date: August 4, 1992; Label: Risque Disque	—	3	CAN: 2× Platinum
Five Days in July	Release date: October 26, 1993; Label: Warner Music Canada	3	8	CAN: 6× Platinum
Nowhere to Here	Release date: September 5, 1995; Label: Warner Music Canada	18	2	CAN: 2× Platinum
Tremolo	Release date: July 15, 1997; Label: Warner Music Canada	1	8	CAN: Platinum
"—" denotes releases that did not chart

==== 2000s albums ====
Title	Details	Peak positions	Certifications (sales thresholds)
Title	Details	CAN	Certifications (sales thresholds)
The Days in Between^{[A]}	Release date: January 11, 2000; Label: Warner Music Canada	4	CAN: Gold
Palace of Gold	Release date: October 8, 2002; Label: Warner Music Canada	6	CAN: Platinum
Are You Ready	Release date: April 5, 2005; Label: Warner Music Canada	3	CAN: Gold
Small Miracles	Release date: September 25, 2007; Label: Warner Music Canada	5	CAN: Gold
The Things We Left Behind	Release date: November 10, 2009; Label: Warner Music Canada	6	CAN: Platinum

==== 2010s albums ====
Title	Details	Peak positions	Certifications (sales thresholds)
Title	Details	CAN	Certifications (sales thresholds)
In Our Nature	Release date: October 29, 2013; Label: Warner Music Canada	2	CAN: Gold
A Merrie Christmas to You	Release date: November 4, 2014; Label: Warner Music Canada	—	
1000 Arms	Release date: October 28, 2016; Label: Warner Music Canada	6	
"—" denotes releases that did not chart

==== 2020s albums ====
Title	Details	Peak positions
Title	Details	CAN
Many a Mile	Release date: December 3, 2021; Label: Warner Music Canada	45

=== Live albums ===
Title	Details	Peak positions	Certifications (sales thresholds)
Title	Details	CAN	Certifications (sales thresholds)
Just Like a Vacation	Release date: 1999; Label: Warner Music Canada	20	CAN: Platinum
Blue Rodeo Live in Stratford	Release date: 2006; Label: Instant Live	—	
Blue Road	Release date: 2008; Label: Warner Music Canada	—	CAN: Double Platinum Video
Live At Massey Hall	Release date: 2015; Label: Warner Music Canada	24	
"—" denotes releases that did not chart

=== Compilation albums ===
Title	Details	Peak positions	Certifications (sales thresholds)
Title	Details	CAN	Certifications (sales thresholds)
Greatest Hits, Vol. 1	Release date: October 2, 2001; Label: Warner Music Canada	7	CAN: 4× Platinum
Greatest Hits, Vol. 2	Release date: March 21, 2025; Label: Warner Music Canada		

=== Box sets ===
Title	Details	Peak positions	Certifications (sales thresholds)
Title	Details	CAN	Certifications (sales thresholds)
Blue Rodeo: 1987 - 1993	Release date: October 16, 2012; Label: Warner Music Canada	—	

== Singles ==
=== 1980s singles ===
Year	Single	Peak chart positions			Certifications (sales thresholds)	Album
Year	Single	CAN	CAN Country	CAN AC	Certifications (sales thresholds)	Album
1987	"Outskirts"	—	35	—		Outskirts
1987	"Try"	6	1	3	CAN: Gold	Outskirts
1988	"Rose-Coloured Glasses"	39	48	24		Outskirts
1988	"Rebel"	71	33	—		Outskirts
1989	"Diamond Mine"	7	—	—		Diamond Mine
1989	"How Long"	25	20	6		Diamond Mine
1989	"House of Dreams"	49	—	—		Diamond Mine
"—" denotes releases that did not chart

=== 1990s singles ===
Year	Single	Peak chart positions			Album
Year	Single	CAN	CAN Country	CAN AC	Album
1990	"Love and Understanding"	—	32	—	Diamond Mine
1990	"Til I Am Myself Again"^{[B]}	3	1	2	Casino
1991	"Trust Yourself"	13	—	—	Casino
1991	"What Am I Doing Here"	33	41	17	Casino
1991	"After the Rain"	30	—	—	Casino
1992	"Lost Together"	3	—	6	Lost Together
1992	"Rain Down on Me"	11	23	26	Lost Together
1993	"Angels"	75	—	—	Lost Together
1993	"Flying"	42	—	—	Lost Together
1993	"Already Gone"	33	14	21	Lost Together
1993	"5 Days In May"	4	18	5	Five Days In July
1994	"Hasn't Hit Me Yet"	8	—	8	Five Days In July
1994	"Bad Timing"	17	—	15	Five Days In July
1994	"Dark Angel"	—	—	19	Five Days In July
1994	"'Til I Gain Control Again"	—	24	—	Five Days In July
1995	"Head Over Heels"	33	4	16	Five Days In July
1995	"Save Myself"	—	—	—	Nowhere to Here
1995	"Side of the Road"	4	—	9	Nowhere to Here
1995	"Better Off As We Are"	5	—	15	Nowhere to Here
1996	"Blew It Again"	70	—	—	Nowhere to Here
1996	"Girl In Green"	—	—	—	Nowhere to Here
1997	"It Could Happen To You"	4	23	8	Tremolo
1998	"Falling Down Blue"	50	75	—	Tremolo
1998	"No Miracle, No Dazzle"	—	—	—	Tremolo
1999	"Somebody Waits"	29	45	8	The Days in Between
"—" denotes releases that did not chart

=== 2000s singles ===
Year	Single	Peak positions	Album
Year	Single	CAN	Album
2000	"Always Getting Better"^{[C]}	—	The Days in Between
2000	"The Days in Between"	—	The Days in Between
2001	"Sad Nights"	—	The Days in Between
2001	"To Love Somebody"	—	Greatest Hits, Vol. 1
2002	"Bulletproof"	—	Palace of Gold
2002	"Walk Like You Don't Mind"	—	Palace of Gold
2003	"Stage Door"	—	Palace of Gold
2003	"Love Never Lies/Palace of Gold"	—	Palace of Gold
2005	"Rena"	—	Are You Ready
2005	"Are You Ready"	—	Are You Ready
2005	"Can't Help Wondering Why"	—	Are You Ready
2007	"Four Strong Winds"	—	The Gift - A Tribute to Ian Tyson
2007	"C'mon"	68	Small Miracles
2007	"3 Hours Away"	—	Small Miracles
2008	"This Town"	73	Small Miracles
2008	"Losin' You"	—	Blue Road
2009	"Arizona Dust"	—	The Things We Left Behind
"—" denotes releases that did not chart

=== 2010s singles ===
Year	Single	Peak chart positions		Album
Year	Single	CAN AC	CAN Rock	Album
2010	"Never Look Back"	—	—	The Things We Left Behind
2010	"Waiting For The World"	—	—	The Things We Left Behind
2013	"New Morning Sun"	36	48	In Our Nature
2014	"Never Too Late"	—	—	In Our Nature
2014	"When The Truth Comes Out"	—	—	In Our Nature
2016	"Superstar"	—	—	1000 Arms
2016	"I Can't Hide This Anymore"	—	—	1000 Arms
"—" denotes releases that did not chart

=== 2020s singles ===
Year	Single	Peak chart positions		Album
Year	Single	CAN AC	CAN Rock	Album
2021	"When You Were Wild"	—	—	Many a Mile
2021	"I Owe It to Myself"	—	—	Many a Mile
"—" denotes releases that did not chart

== Videography ==
=== Video albums ===
- Blue Movies (1991)
- In Stereovision (2004) - Certified 3× Platinum by the CRIA.
- Toronto Rocks (SARSfest) (2004) - Canadian edition featuring Blue Rodeo.

=== Video singles ===
- Watch This! (2004) - Features the video of Blue Rodeo's hit single, "Bulletproof."

=== Soundtrack appearances ===
- "I'm Checkin' Out" with Meryl Streep (from Postcards from the Edge) (1990)

== Notes ==
- A The Days in Between also peaked at number 5 on the Canadian RPM Country Albums chart.
- B "Til I Am Myself Again" also peaked at number 19 on the US Modern Rock chart and number 37 on the US Mainstream Rock chart.
- C "Always Getting Better" also peaked at number 41 on the Canadian RPM Adult Contemporary tracks chart.
