= Blue Rodeo Live in Stratford =

Live album by Blue Rodeo
- Released: 2006
- Recorded: January 13–14, 2006
- Genre: Country rock
- Length: 56:15
- Label: Instant Live
- Producer: Blue Rodeo

Blue Rodeo chronology
Are You Ready (2005)	Blue Rodeo Live in Stratford (2006)	Small Miracles (2007)

Live in Stratford is the generic name given to two "official bootleg" albums recorded by Blue Rodeo in January 2006. Instant Live recorded two concerts held at the Festival Theatre in Stratford, Ontario and burned them onto CDs ready for purchase about 15 minutes after each show. Each album contains two discs.

== Details of the shows ==
Blue Rodeo's Stratford shows are done differently from their normal concerts; Blue Rodeo performs two sets with an intermission, and there is no opening act. The shows are performed in the Festival Theatre, generally in January when the Stratford Festival is not running. The Stratford concerts are produced by Chris Parson of Standing Ovation Productions of Stratford.

The January 14 show features guest singer Kate Boothman performing the female vocal on "Can't Help Wondering Why". A running joke has Greg and Jim mistakenly calling her "Kate Brickman", based on an incorrect news article about the show.

Bazil Donovan will often sing one song during a concert, and "Stage Door" is his contribution to the Stratford shows.

The James Inveldt song "Crying Over You" is also featured on the In Stereovision DVD.

== Track listing ==
All songs by Greg Keelor and Jim Cuddy unless otherwise mentioned.

=== January 13, 2006 ===
==== Disc one ====
1. "Heart Like Mine"
2. "What Am I Doing Here"
3. "Rena"
4. "Palace of Gold"
5. "Side of the Road"
6. "Better Off as We Are"
7. "Bulletproof"
8. "Up on That Cloud"
9. "Til I Am Myself Again"
10. "Photograph"
11. "I Will"
12. "Glad to be Alive"
13. "Can't Help Wondering Why"

==== Disc two ====
1. "Bad Timing"
2. "Dark Angel"
3. "Phaedra's Meadow"
4. "Head Over Heels"
5. "Five Days in May"
6. "Stage Door"
7. "It Could Happen to You"
8. "Try"
9. "Tired of Pretending"
10. "Are You Ready"
11. "Little Ol' Wine-Drinker Me" (Garrett, Jennings, Mills)
12. "Diamond Mine/Hasn't Hit Me Yet"
13. "Lost Together" (Released as a bonus track)

=== January 14, 2006 ===
==== Disc one ====
1. "What am I Doing Here/Photograph"
2. "Bad Timing"
3. "Somebody Touched Me (traditional gospel song)/Stage Door"
4. "Up on That Cloud/Now and Forever"
5. "Run Boy Run" (Lee Hazlewood)
6. "I Will"
7. "Palace of Gold"
8. "Crying Over You" (James Inveldt)
9. "Can't Help Wondering Why"
10. "Five Days in May"

==== Disc two ====
1. "Glad to be Alive"
2. "Head Over Heels"
3. "Rena"
4. "Side of the Road"
5. "Tired of Pretending"
6. "Trust Yourself"
7. "Try"
8. "It Could Happen to You"
9. "Diamond Mine"
10. "Dark Angel"
11. "'Til I Gain Control Again (Rodney Crowell)/'Til I Am Myself Again"
12. "The Railroad" (Lee Hazlewood) (Released as a bonus track)
