= Greatest Hits, Vol. 1 (Blue Rodeo album) =

Album by Blue Rodeo

Greatest hits album by Blue Rodeo
- Released: October 2, 2001
- Recorded: 1987–2001
- Genre: Country rock
- Length: 73:57
- Label: Warner Music Canada
- Producer: Blue Rodeo, Trina Shoemaker, John Whynot, Pete Anderson, Terry Brown

Blue Rodeo chronology
The Days in Between (2000)	Greatest Hits, Vol. 1 (2001)	Palace of Gold (2002)

Professional ratings
Review scores
Source	Rating
AllMusic	4/5 stars

Greatest Hits, Vol. 1 is a 2001 greatest hits album by Blue Rodeo. It was released in Canada in 2001 and the United States in 2004.

== Track listing ==
All songs by Greg Keelor and Jim Cuddy, except where noted.

1. "To Love Somebody" – 5:48 - Barry Gibb, Robin Gibb
2. "Rose-Coloured Glasses" – 4:28
3. "Try" – 4:00
4. "Diamond Mine" – 8:08
5. "Til I Am Myself Again" – 4:00
6. "Trust Yourself" – 3:34
7. "Lost Together" – 5:14
8. "5 Days in May" – 7:10
9. "Hasn't Hit Me Yet" – 5:11
10. "Bad Timing" – 5:03
11. "Dark Angel" – 5:18
12. "Side of the Road" – 6:05
13. "It Could Happen to You" – 4:35
14. "After the Rain" – 6:43

== Track trivia ==
- This album collects singles from all Blue Rodeo albums to that point, except The Days In Between.
- This album includes a cover of "To Love Somebody" by The Bee Gees.
- "After the Rain", from 1990's Casino, is included with a new, rerecorded version featuring the band's then-present lineup, a horn section, and backing vocals in the third verse.
- The U.S. release contains Palace of Gold's single "Bulletproof" in place of "It Could Happen to You".

== Charts ==
=== Weekly charts ===
Weekly chart performance for Greatest Hits, Vol. 1 by Blue Rodeo
Chart (2001–02)	Peak position
Canadian Albums (Billboard)	7

=== Year-end charts ===
2001 year-end chart performance for Greatest Hits, Vol. 1 by Blue Rodeo
Chart (2001)	Position
Canadian Albums (Nielsen SoundScan)	78

2002 year-end chart performance for Greatest Hits, Vol. 1 by Blue Rodeo
Chart (2002)	Position
Canadian Alternative Albums (Nielsen SoundScan)	66
Canadian Albums (Nielsen SoundScan)	200

== Certifications ==
Region	Certification
Canada (Music Canada)	2× Platinum
