= Just Like a Vacation =

Live album by Blue Rodeo
- Released: 1999
- Recorded: 1999
- Genre: Country rock
- Length: 78:40
- Label: Warner Music Canada
- Producer: Blue Rodeo

Blue Rodeo chronology
Tremolo (1997)	Just Like a Vacation (1999)	The Days in Between (2000)

Professional ratings
Review scores
Source	Rating
Allmusic	2.5/5 stars

Just Like a Vacation is a 1999 live album by Blue Rodeo.

== Track listing ==
1. "Til I Am Myself Again" – 4:19
2. "What Am I Doing Here" – 3:22
3. "Better Off As We Are" – 5:00
4. "Floating" – 8:11
5. "After the Rain" – 6:21
6. "Fallen from Grace" – 4:02
7. "The Ballad of the Dime Store Greaser and the Blonde Mona Lisa" – 3:15
8. "It Could Happen to You" – 5:12
9. "Girl in Green" – 7:10
10. "Try" – 4:07
11. "Trust Yourself" – 6:06
12. "Dark Angel" – 5:14
13. "Cynthia" – 4:43
14. "Montreal" – 4:13
15. "Piranha Pool" – 5:11
16. "Bad Timing" – 5:11
17. "5 Days in May" – 8:19
18. "Hasn't Hit Me Yet" – 5:21
19. "Diamond Mine" – 10:31
20. "Falling Down Blue" – 5:33
21. "Lost Together" – 6:16
22. "Florida" – 7:16

== Personnel ==
Personnel taken from Just Like a Vacation liner notes.

Blue Rodeo

- Jim Cuddy – vocals, guitar, mandolin, harmonica
- Kim Deschamps – pedal & lapsteel, Dobro, guitar, mandolin
- Bazil Donovan – bass, double bass
- James Gray – keyboards, accordion
- Greg Keelor – vocals, guitar, drums
- Glenn Milchem – drums, percussion, guitar

String Section

- Anne Lindsay – first violin on "Fallen from Grace", violin on "It Could Happen to You"
- Lenny Solomon – second violin on "Fallen from Grace"
- Wendy Solomon – cello on "Fallen from Grace"
- Parmela Attariwala – viola on "Fallen from Grace"

Production

- Blue Rodeo – production
- Mike Brownlee – recording assistance
- Ruth Kearney – production manager
- Thom Panunzio – mix engineering
- Dave Reed – mix assistance
- Greg Calbi – mastering
- Denise Grant – cover photography
- Ralph Alfonso – design, liner notes, tray card photography

== Chart performance ==
Chart (1999)	Peak position
Canadian RPM Top Albums	20

== Certifications ==
Region	Certification
Canada (Music Canada)	Platinum
