= Blue Rodeo: 1987–1993 =

Box set by Blue Rodeo
- Released: October 16, 2012
- Recorded: 1987–1993
- Genre: Country rock
- Label: Warner Music Canada
- Producer: Blue Rodeo, Pete Anderson, Terry Brown

Blue Rodeo chronology
The Things We Left Behind (2009)	Blue Rodeo: 1987–1993 (2012)	In Our Nature (2013)

Blue Rodeo: 1987–1993 is a 2012 compilation box set by Blue Rodeo. It comprises remastered versions of Blue Rodeo's first five albums, all released between 1987 and 1993, as well as three discs of remixes, outtakes and demos of unreleased material from the band.

== Disc listing ==
1. "Outskirts" (remastered)
2. "Outskirts" (remixed)
3. "Diamond Mine" (remastered)
4. "Casino" (remastered)
5. "Casino" (demo tracks)
6. "Lost Together" (remastered)
7. "Five Days in July" (remastered)
8. "Odds and Ends" (disc of demos and outtakes)
