= Live at Massey Hall (Blue Rodeo album) =

Live At Massey Hall

Live album by Blue Rodeo
- Released: October 16, 2015
- Recorded: February 20, 2014
- Venue: Massey Hall, Toronto
- Genre: Country rock
- Length: 79:10
- Label: Warner Music Canada

Blue Rodeo chronology
A Merrie Christmas to You (2014)	Live At Massey Hall (2015)	1000 Arms (2016)

Live At Massey Hall is a live album by Canadian country rock group Blue Rodeo, released by Warner Music Canada on October 16, 2015. The album was recorded during the band's shows at Massey Hall in 2014, during their tour to support their 2013 album, In Our Nature.

== Track listing ==
All songs written by Greg Keelor and Jim Cuddy.

1. "Head Over Heels" — 4:18
2. "Rose Coloured Glasses" — 4:52
3. "Bad Timing" — 5:10
4. "Disappear" — 8:04
5. "New Morning Sun" — 4:27
6. "Tara's Blues" — 4:13
7. "Tell Me Again" — 3:36
8. "When The Truth Comes Out" — 3:45
9. "Diamond Mine" — 9:25
10. "Girl Of Mine" — 4:09
11. "After The Rain" — 6:44
12. "Paradise" — 4:19
13. "5 Days In May" — 9:26
14. "Lost Together" — 6:42

== Personnel ==
Personnel taken from Live at Massey Hall liner notes.

Blue Rodeo

- Bazil Donovan – bass
- Bob Egan – pedal steel, mandolin, banjo, Dobro, guitar
- Colin Cripps – guitar, backing vocals
- Glenn Milchem – drums
- Greg Keelor – vocals, guitar
- Jim Cuddy – vocals, guitar, mandolin, harmonica, piano on "When The Truth Comes Out" and "After The Rain"
- Michael Boguski – piano, organ, accordion

Production

- Blue Rodeo – production
- Duke Foster – recording, mixing
- João Carvalho – mastering

== Chart performance ==
Chart (2015)	Peak position
Canadian Albums (Billboard)	24
