= Are You Ready (Blue Rodeo album) =

Studio album by Blue Rodeo
- Released: April 5, 2005
- Recorded: 2005
- Genre: Country rock
- Length: 51:00
- Label: Warner Music Canada
- Producer: Blue Rodeo

Blue Rodeo chronology
Palace of Gold (2002)	Are You Ready (2005)	Live in Stratford (2006)

Professional ratings
Review scores
Source	Rating
Allmusic	3.5/5 stars

Are You Ready is the tenth studio album by Blue Rodeo, released on April 5, 2005.

== Track listing ==
All songs by Greg Keelor and Jim Cuddy.

1. "Can't Help Wondering Why" - 2:55
2. "Are You Ready" - 3:59
3. "Rena" - 4:34
4. "Up On That Cloud" - 3:33
5. "I Will" - 3:35
6. "Phaedra's Meadow" - 5:26
7. "Runaway Train" - 4:14
8. "Stuck on You" - 3:54
9. "Beverley Street" - 3:25
10. "Finger Lakes" - 5:07
11. "Tired Of Pretending" - 6:22
12. "Don't Get Angry" - 4:02

The Canadian iTunes Music Store version also features a bonus track called "Green Room".

== Track trivia ==
- The title track is a more upbeat version of a song that appears on Greg Keelor's second solo album, Seven Songs for Jim.
- "Rena", the first single from the album, is named for Jim Cuddy's wife, Rena Polley. The first single off the album, it has been described as "a sonic return to [the band's] Casino-era roots".
- Paddy Moloney of The Chieftains plays tin whistle and Uilleann pipes on "Phaedra's Meadow".
- "Runaway Train" mentions The Sleeping Giant, a geological formation near Thunder Bay, Ontario.
- "Beverley Street" was originally intended for Diamond Mine, but the band had forgotten about it long ago. They relearned of its existence only in 2004, thanks to some friends who had bootlegged a concert featuring this song and performed their own version for bassist Bazil Donovan. The song itself references Beverley Street in Toronto, a north-south street that starts at Queen Street West and extends north to College Street, where it turns into St. George Street.
- The "Finger Lakes" referred to in the song are a group of 11 long, narrow lakes in upstate New York. Jim Cuddy has often said at concerts that the song is at least partially based on his relationship with his father.
- This is the last studio album to have James Gray on keyboards

== Personnel ==
- Jim Cuddy: Vocals, Guitar, Piano, Pump Organ
- Bazil Donovan: Bass
- Bob Egan: Pedal Steel Guitar, National Steel Guitar
- James Gray: Piano, Organ
- Greg Keelor: Vocals, Guitar, Piano
- Glenn Milchem: Drums, 12 String Guidulcimer, Shaker

Additional musicians/personnel

- Bryden Baird: Trumpet
- Joao Carvalho: Mastering
- Patrick Duffy: Design, Illustrations
- Chris Shreenan-Dyck: Producer, Engineer, Mixing
- Paddy Moloney: Uilleann pipes, Tin Whistle
- Bronwin Parks: Design, Illustrations

== Chart performance ==
Chart (2005)	Peak position
Canadian Albums (Billboard)	3

== Certifications ==
Region	Certification
Canada (Music Canada)	Gold
