= Blue Road =

Live album by Blue Rodeo
- Released: October 28, 2008
- Recorded: February 29, 2008
- Venue: Massey Hall, Toronto
- Genre: Country rock
- Length: 49:52
- Label: Warner Music Canada

Blue Rodeo chronology
Small Miracles (2007)	Blue Road (2008)	The Things We Left Behind (2009)

Professional ratings
Review scores
Source	Rating
Allmusic	4/5 stars

Blue Road is a live album by Canadian country rock group Blue Rodeo. It was released by Warner Music Canada on October 28, 2008.

== Track listing ==
All tracks are written by Greg Keelor and Jim Cuddy, except where noted.

No.	Title	Writer(s)	Length
1.	"5 Days In May"		9:04
2.	"Crying Over You"	James Intveld	4:22
3.	"Rebel"		3:36
4.	"Blue House"	Keelor/Cuddy; Damian Rogers	3:15
5.	"3 Hours Away"		3:53
6.	"Try"		3:38
7.	"To Love Somebody"	Barry Alan Gibb; Robin Hugh Gibb	5:09
8.	"Know Where You Go"		5:06
9.	"Tell Me Your Dream"		2:38
10.	"Bad Timing"		4:58
11.	"Losing You"		4:13
Total length:			49:52

== Personnel ==
Personnel taken from Blue Road liner notes.

Blue Rodeo

- Bazil Donovan – bass
- Greg Keelor – vocals, guitar
- Glenn Milchem – drums
- Bob Egan – pedal steel guitar
- Jim Cuddy – vocals, guitar
- Bob Packwood – piano, organ

Additional musician

- Melissa McClelland – guest vocals on "Know Where You Go" and "Tell Me Your Dream"

Production

- Blue Rodeo – production
- Ian Osborn – recording, mixing
- Greg Keelor – mixing
- Greg Calbi – mastering
