= Small Miracles =

Small Miracles may refer to:

- Small Miracles (book series), series of inspirational books by Yitta Halberstam and Judith Leventhal
- Small Miracles (album), 2007 album by Blue Rodeo

== See also ==
- Small Miracle, 1934 film
