= Nowhere to Here =

Studio album by Blue Rodeo
- Released: August 29, 1995
- Recorded: 1995
- Studio: Lost Cause, Peterborough, Ontario; Reaction, Toronto
- Genre: Country rock
- Length: 62:42
- Label: Warner Music Canada
- Producer: Blue Rodeo, John Whynot

Blue Rodeo chronology
Five Days in July (1993)	Nowhere to Here (1995)	Tremolo (1997)

Professional ratings
Review scores
Source	Rating
Allmusic	3/5 stars

Nowhere to Here is the sixth studio album by Blue Rodeo.

A more electric rock album than the band's 1993 outing Five Days in July, the album was not as well received by critics and fans as its predecessor. Despite this, "Side of the Road" and "Better Off As We Are" were notable singles.

Sarah McLachlan appears as a guest vocalist on "Save Myself", "Girl in Green", and "Brown-Eyed Dog".

Some copies came with a 15-track second CD called

From There to Here: Best Of

== Track listing ==
All tracks are written by Greg Keelor and Jim Cuddy.

No.	Title	Length
1.	"Save Myself"	6:00
2.	"Girl in Green"	6:20
3.	"What You Want"	4:14
4.	"Side of the Road"	6:20
5.	"Better Off As We Are"	3:27
6.	"Sky"	5:59
7.	"Brown-Eyed Dog"	4:47
8.	"Blew it Again"	5:37
9.	"Get Through to You"	4:08
10.	"Armour"	4:01
11.	"Train"	3:45
12.	"Flaming Bed"	8:04

== Personnel ==
Blue Rodeo

- Jim Cuddy – vocals, guitar, piano
- Kim Deschamps – pedal & lap steel, Dobro
- Bazil Donovan – bass, guitar
- James Gray – keyboards, guitorgan
- Greg Keelor – vocals, guitar
- Glenn Milchem – drums

Additional musicians

- Sarah McLachlan – backing vocals on "Girl in Green", "Brown-Eyed Dog", and "Save Myself"
- John Whynot – Fender Bass VI on "Girl in Green" and "Brown-Eyed Dog"; piano on "Get Through to You"; Farfisa organ on "Train"

Production

- Blue Rodeo – producer
- John Whynot – producer, recording and mixing engineer
- Annelise Norontia – assistant mixing engineer
- Greg Calbi – mastering

== Chart performance ==
Chart (1995)	Peak position
Canadian RPM Top Albums	2
Canadian RPM Country Albums	18

== Certifications ==
Region	Certification
Canada (Music Canada)	2× Platinum
