= Many a Mile (Blue Rodeo album) =

Studio album by Blue Rodeo
- Released: December 3, 2021
- Recorded: 2021
- Genre: Country rock
- Length: 57:46
- Label: Warner Music Canada
- Producer: Greg Keelor; Jim Cuddy; James McKenty; Tim Vesely; Colin Cripps; Jimmy Bowskill

Blue Rodeo chronology
1000 Arms (2016)	Many a Mile (2021)

Many a Mile is the sixteenth studio album by Canadian country rock band Blue Rodeo, released on December 3, 2021.

== Track listing ==
All tracks are written by Greg Keelor and Jim Cuddy.

No.	Title	Length
1.	"When You Were Wild"	3:59
2.	"I Owe It To Myself"	4:45
3.	"Deep Dark Well"	5:38
4.	"All In Your Hands"	4:25
5.	"Symmetry of Starlight"	4:48
6.	"I Will Wait For You"	5:02
7.	"The Opening Act"	4:51
8.	"Never Like This Before"	5:25
9.	"Criticize"	4:02
10.	"I Think About You"	3:50
11.	"Julie Is Painting"	6:14
12.	"Ride Your Bike"	4:47
Total length:		57:46

== Personnel ==
Credits adapted from album's liner notes.

- Greg Keelor – lead and harmony vocals, electric guitar
- Jim Cuddy – lead and harmony vocals, acoustic guitar
- Bazil Donovan – bass guitar
- Glenn Milchem – drums
- Colin Cripps – electric and acoustic guitars, harmony vocals
- Michael Boguski – piano, organ, synthesizer, synthesizer strings, electric piano, Wurlitzer, Hammond organ, Ace Tone keyboard
- Jimmy Bowskill – mandolin, pedal steel guitar, electric and acoustic guitars, Fender Bass VI, banjo, Weissenborn guitar, harmony vocals

Guest musicians/personnel

- Brittany Brooks – harmony vocals (tracks 3, 5, 11)
- James McKenty – electric and acoustic guitars (tracks 1, 5, 7, 9, 11-12)
- Ian McKeown – tambourine (tracks 1, 3, 9, 11-12)
- Melissa Payne – harmony vocals (tracks 3, 5, 11)
- Tim Vesely – percussion (tracks 2, 4, 8, 10)

== Charts ==
Chart performance for Many a Mile
Chart (2021)	Peak position
Canadian Albums (Billboard)	45
