= 1000 Arms =

Studio album by Blue Rodeo
- Released: October 28, 2016
- Recorded: 2016
- Studio: The Woodshed, Toronto
- Genre: Country rock
- Length: 54:16
- Label: Warner Music Canada
- Producer: Blue Rodeo, Tim Vesely

Blue Rodeo chronology
Live At Massey Hall (2015)	1000 Arms (2016)	Many a Mile (2021)

1000 Arms is the fifteenth studio album by Canadian country rock band Blue Rodeo, released on October 28, 2016.

== Track listing ==
All songs written by Greg Keelor and Jim Cuddy.

1. "Hard to Remember" – 4:57
2. "I Can't Hide This Anymore" – 3:21
3. "Jimmy Fall Down" – 4:19
4. "Long Hard Life" – 3:40
5. "Rabbit's Foot" – 4:03
6. "1000 Arms" – 4:33
7. "Dust to Gold" – 4:40
8. "Superstar" – 3:37
9. "Mascara Tears" – 4:25
10. "Can't Find My Way Back to You" – 5:21
11. "So Hard to See" – 4:49
12. "The Flame" – 6:31

== Personnel ==
Personnel taken from 1000 Arms liner notes.

Blue Rodeo

- Bazil Donovan – bass
- Bob Egan – pedal steel guitar, mandolin
- Colin Cripps – guitar, backing vocals
- Glenn Milchem – drums, percussion
- Greg Keelor – vocals, guitar, guitar synthesizer on "So Hard to See", "The Flame", and "Dust to Gold"
- Jim Cuddy – vocals, guitar, Wurlitzer on "Mascara Tears"
- Michael Boguski – piano, electric piano, organ

Additional musicians

- Jimmy Bowskill – mandolin on "I Can't Hide This Anymore" and "Jimmy Fall Down"
- Gary Pattison – French horn on "Superstar"

Production

- Blue Rodeo – production
- Tim Vesely – production, recording, mixing
- Greg Calbi – mastering on "Hard to Remember", "Jimmy Fall Down", "Long Hard Life", "Rabbit's Foot", "1000 Arms", "Superstar", and "So Hard to See"
- João Carvalho – mastering on "I Can't Hide This Anymore", "Dust to Gold", "Mascara Tears", "Can't Find My Way Back to You", and "The Flame"

== Charts ==
Chart (2016)	Peak position
Canadian Albums (Billboard)	6
