= Blue Rodeo: Lost Together =

2024 Canadian documentary film

- Film Poster
- Directed by: Dale Heslip
- Produced by: Francine Dibacco; Corey Russell
- Starring: Blue Rodeo
- Narrated by: Jim Cuddy; Greg Keelor
- Cinematography: Jon Elliott
- Edited by: Drew MacLeod
- Production company: Cream Productions
- Distributed by: Blue Ice Docs
- Release date: December 6, 2024 (Whistler)
- Running time: 88 minutes
- Country: Canada
- Language: English

Blue Rodeo: Lost Together is a 2024 Canadian documentary film, directed by Dale Heslip. The film profiles influential Canadian country rock band Blue Rodeo, featuring narration by bandleaders Jim Cuddy and Greg Keelor.

The film premiered at the 2024 Whistler Film Festival, where it was the winner of the Audience Award. It has been acquired for theatrical and streaming distribution by Blue Ice Docs.

== Awards ==
| Association | Year | Category | Recipient | Result | Ref. |
|---|---|---|---|---|---|
| Canadian Screen Awards | 2026 | Best Biography or Arts Documentary Program or Series | David W. Brady, Kate Harrison Karman, Paul Johnson, Susan de Cartier, Corey Russell, Francine DiBacco, Dale Heslip | Won | |
| Canadian Screen Awards | 2026 | Best Direction in a Documentary Program | Dale Heslip | Nominated | |
