= Tremolo (album) =

Studio album by Blue Rodeo
- Released: July 15, 1997
- Recorded: 1997
- Studios: Chemical Sound, Toronto
- Genre: Country rock
- Length: 63:36
- Label: Warner Music Canada
- Producers: Blue Rodeo, John Whynot

Blue Rodeo chronology
Nowhere to Here (1995)	Tremolo (1997)	Just Like a Vacation (1999)

Professional ratings
Review scores
Source	Rating
Allmusic	3/5 stars

Tremolo is the seventh studio album by Blue Rodeo.

On this album, the band attempted to maintain a more immediate vibe than on 1995's Nowhere to Here, which had been labelled as overly mannered by critics. To that end, songs were not brought to the whole band until the day of recording, so that the band's performance would retain a spontaneous flair.

== Track listing ==
All tracks are written by Greg Keelor and Jim Cuddy, except where noted.

No.	Title	Writer(s)	Length
1.	"Moon & Tree"		3:20
2.	"Shed My Skin"		3:32
3.	"No Miracle, No Dazzle"	Keelor, Cuddy, Colin Cripps, Michelle McAdorey	3:54
4.	"Falling Down Blue"		5:00
5.	"I Could Never Be That Man"		3:09
6.	"Beautiful Blue"		6:42
7.	"Fallen From Grace"		3:50
8.	"Me & Baz"		3:44
9.	"Disappear"		5:21
10.	"It Could Happen To You"		4:59
11.	"Dragging On"		5:52
12.	"Brother Andre's Heart"		4:42
13.	"Frogs' Lullaby"		7:05
14.	"Graveyard"		2:26
Total length:			63:36

== Personnel ==
Personnel taken from Tremolo liner notes.

Blue Rodeo

- Jim Cuddy – vocals, guitar, mandolin, piano (track 1)
- Kim Deschamps – pedal & lap steel, banjo, bottleneck guitar
- Bazil Donovan – bass guitar, upright bass, guitar (track 2)
- James Gray – keyboards, guitar (tracks 1, 7)
- Greg Keelor – vocals, guitar, drums (track 4)
- Glenn Milchem – drums, percussion, guitar (tracks 4, 13, 14)

Additional musicians

- Colin Cripps – guitar (tracks 1, 9)
- John Whynot – backing vocals (tracks 1, 7, 12), guitar (tracks 5, 7), string arrangements & conducting (tracks 7, 9, 11, 12)
- Adele Armin – violin (tracks 7, 9, 11, 12)
- Artur Jansons – viola (tracks 7, 9, 11, 12)
- Mi Hyon Kim – violin (tracks 7, 9, 11, 12)
- Audrey King – cello (tracks 7, 9, 11, 12)
- David McFadden – violin (tracks 7, 9, 11, 12)
- Vera Tannowsky – violin (tracks 7, 9, 11, 12)
- Kent Teeple – viola (tracks 7, 9, 11, 12)
- Kirk Worthington – cello (tracks 7, 9, 11, 12)

Production

- Blue Rodeo – production
- John Whynot – production, engineering, mixing
- Peter Wonsiak – mixing assistance
- Greg Calbi – mastering

== Chart performance ==
Chart (1997)	Peak position
Canadian RPM Country Albums	1
Canadian RPM Top Albums	8

== Certifications ==
Region	Certification
Canada (Music Canada)	Platinum
