= Ladies of the Canyon =

Ladies of the Canyon may refer to:

- Ladies of the Canyon (album), a 1970 album by Canadian singer-songwriter Joni Mitchell
  - "Ladies of the Canyon" (song), the title track of that album
- Ladies of the Canyon (band), a Canadian roots rock band from Montreal, Quebec
