= Devin Cuddy =

Canadian singer-songwriter

- Born: Devin Cuddy
- Origin: Toronto, Ontario, Canada
- Genres: Country, Rock
- Occupations: Musician, songwriter
- Instruments: Guitar, piano, vocals
- Years active: 2012–present
- Label: Cameron House Records
- Website: devincuddy.com

Devin Cuddy (born 1987) is a Canadian singer-songwriter who fronts the Devin Cuddy Band.

== Personal life ==
His father, Jim Cuddy, is a founding member of the Canadian band Blue Rodeo, and his mother, Rena Polley, is an actress. He was born the same night Blue Rodeo began recording their 1987 album Outskirts.

== Devin Cuddy Band ==
The Devin Cuddy Band consists of Devin Cuddy, Michael Tuyp, Pat Phillips, and Devon Richardson. Cuddy began his career in music while working as a bartender at The Cameron House, as well as living in one of the bar's upstairs apartments. His initial interest was in jazz, with his style evolving toward a blend of country and New Orleans blues as he began writing original songs.

The Devin Cuddy Band's first album, Volume One, was released on Cameron House Records in 2012, and received a Juno Award nomination for Roots & Traditional Album of the Year, Group at the Juno Awards of 2014.

In early 2014, his band opened for Blue Rodeo on that band's In Our Nature tour. Later that year the Devin Cuddy Band released their second album, Kitchen Knife, which was produced by Blue Rodeo's Greg Keelor. Over the next number of years he toured regularly, both with the Devin Cuddy Band and as a supporting musician in Jim's solo band.

His third album, Dear Jane, was released in 2023. In 2026 he followed up with Livin' Hard Ain't Easy.

== Discography ==
- Volume One - 2012
- Kitchen Knife - 2014
- Dear Jane - 2023
- Livin' Hard Ain't Easy - 2026
