= Palace of Gold (album) =

Studio album by Blue Rodeo
- Released: October 8, 2002
- Recorded: 2002
- Genre: Country rock
- Length: 53:05
- Label: Warner Music Canada
- Producer: Blue Rodeo

Blue Rodeo chronology
| Greatest Hits, Vol. 1 (2001) | Palace of Gold (2002) | Are You Ready (2005) |

Professional ratings
Review scores
| Source | Rating |
|---|---|
| Allmusic | 3/5 stars |

Palace of Gold is the ninth studio album by the Canadian country rock band Blue Rodeo. It is the band's first album with guitarist Bob Egan, formerly of Freakwater and Wilco, and is notable for performances featuring the Bushwhack Horns.

== Track listing ==
All songs by Greg Keelor and Jim Cuddy, except where noted.

1. "Palace of Gold" – 3:47
2. "Holding On" – 3:56
3. "Homeward Bound Angel" – 5:47
4. "Bulletproof" – 4:43
5. "Comet" – 3:43
6. "Walk Like You Don't Mind" – 4:09
7. "Love Never Lies" – 3:27
8. "Stage Door" – 3:01
9. "Cause for Sympathy" – 4:11
10. "What a Surprise" – 3:33
11. "Clearer View" – 2:41
12. "Glad to Be Alive" – 3:20
13. "Find a Way to Say Goodbye" – 4:20
14. "Tell Me Baby" – 5:02
15. "The Railroad" (Lee Hazlewood) (Live – US edition only) – 4:19
16. "Bad Timing" (Live – US edition only) – 6:07
17. "You're Everywhere" (Live – US edition only) – 3:40

The title track was later covered by the Toronto surf-country band The Sadies under the title of "The Story's Often Told". The Sadies' album on which the track appears was produced by Blue Rodeo's singer/guitarist, Greg Keelor.

The singer/guitarist, Jim Cuddy, said in concert that "Bulletproof", the album's first single, was his attempt to emulate the songwriting of his admired singer-songwriter Ron Sexsmith. He originally wrote the song to give to Blue Rodeo's bass guitarist, Bazil Donovan, for use in a solo project, but chose in the end to keep the song for Blue Rodeo.

"Glad to Be Alive" was later re-recorded for Blue Rodeo's 2014 Christmas album, A Merrie Christmas to You.

"Clearer View" was later re-recorded for Jim Cuddy's 2019 solo album, Countrywide Soul.

== Personnel ==
Personnel taken from Palace of Gold liner notes.

Blue Rodeo

- Jim Cuddy – vocals, guitar, Wurlitzer
- Greg Keelor – vocals, guitar
- Bazil Donovan – bass
- Glenn Milchem – drums
- James Gray – piano, organ, Wurlitzer
- Bob Egan – pedal steel, mandolin, guitar

Additional musicians

- The Bushwhack Horns
  - Bryden Baird – trumpet, French horn, flugelhorn
  - Stephen Donald – trombone
  - Chris Gale – baritone sax
  - Richard Underhill – alto sax, baritone sax, horn arrangements
- Molly Johnson – backing vocals
- Laura Hubert – backing vocals
- Paul Aucoin – vibraphone
- The Planet Soul Strings
  - Anne Lindsay – violin, string arrangements
  - Jayne Maddison – violin
  - Ron Mah – violin
  - Adele Armin – violin
  - Wendy Rose – violin
  - Norman Hathaway – violin
  - Claudio Vena – viola
  - Dan Blackman – viola
  - Richard Armin – cello
  - Winona Zelenka – cello

Production

- Blue Rodeo – production, mixing, string and horn arrangements
- Nick Holmes – recording (all except "Tell Me Baby"), mixing
- Ian Osborne – recording on "Tell Me Baby"
- Greg Calbi – mastering

== Charts ==
=== Weekly charts ===
Weekly chart performance for Palace of Gold
| Chart (2002) | Peak position |
|---|---|
| Canadian Albums (Billboard) | 6 |

=== Year-end charts ===
Year-end chart performance for Palace of Gold
| Chart (2002) | Position |
|---|---|
| Canadian Albums (Nielsen SoundScan) | 89 |
| Canadian Alternative Albums (Nielsen SoundScan) | 26 |

== Certifications ==
| Region | Certification | Certified units/sales |
|---|---|---|
| Canada (Music Canada) | Platinum | 100,000^{^} |
^{^} Shipments figures based on certification alone.
