= The Things We Left Behind =

Studio album by Blue Rodeo
- Released: November 10, 2009
- Recorded: 2009
- Studio: The Woodshed, Toronto; Lost Cause, Peterborough, Ontario
- Genre: Country rock
- Length: 84:31
- Label: Warner Music Canada
- Producer: Blue Rodeo

Blue Rodeo chronology
Blue Road (2008)	The Things We Left Behind (2009)	Blue Rodeo: 1987 - 1993 (2012)

Professional ratings
Review scores
Source	Rating
Allmusic	4/5 stars

The Things We Left Behind is the twelfth studio album released by Canadian country rock band Blue Rodeo, released on November 10, 2009. It is their first studio double album, and is their longest album to date with a run time of 84 minutes.

The album was a longlisted nominee for the 2010 Polaris Music Prize.

== Formats ==
The Things We Left Behind is available as two CD's, two 180 gram LP's (which also included both CD's), and as a digital download.

== Track listing ==
All songs written by Greg Keelor and Jim Cuddy. Disc 1

1. "All the Things that Are Left Behind" - 4:26
2. "One More Night" - 5:34
3. "Waiting for the World" - 4:08
4. "Never Look Back" - 3:19
5. "Sheba" - 4:18
6. "One Light Left in Heaven" - 5:52
7. "Million Miles" - 9:04
8. "Gossip" - 4:49

Disc 2

1. "Don't Let the Darkness in Your Head" - 5:32
2. "Arizona Dust" - 3:54
3. "In My Bones" - 3:17
4. "Candice" - 4:03
5. "Wasted" - 5:55
6. "You Said" - 4:25
7. "And When You Wake Up" - 5:21
8. "Venus Rising" - 10:34

== Personnel ==
Personnel taken from The Things We Left Behind liner notes.

Blue Rodeo

- Bazil Donovan – bass
- Greg Keelor – vocals, guitar, Mellotron (track 1)
- Jim Cuddy – vocals, guitar, piano (tracks 1, 15, 16)
- Glenn Milchem – drums, percussion
- Bob Egan – pedal steel guitar, mandolin

Additional musicians

- Les Allt – flute (track 8)
- Michael Boguski – piano on (tracks 1, 7, 9, 10, 13), organ (tracks 2–4, 9, 13, 14, 16)
- Bryden Baird – strings and woodwind arrangements (track 8)
- Julie Fader – flute (track 14)
- Travis Good – slide guitar (track 11)
- Anne Lindsay – violin (tracks 6, 8, 11, 15), string arrangements (tracks 6, 11, 15)
- Peter Lutek – bassoon (track 8)
- John Marshman – cello (tracks 6, 8, 11, 15)
- Steve O'Connor – Wurlitzer (tracks 2, 3, 5, 7), piano (tracks 6–8, 12), organ (tracks 10, 12, 15)
- Wayne Petti – backing vocals (tracks 2–5, 7, 9, 10, 12, 15, 16)
- Oh Susanna – backing vocals (track 6)
- Jenny Thompson – violin (tracks 8, 15)
- Claudio Vena – viola (tracks 8, 15)

Production

- Blue Rodeo – production, mixing
- Darryl Neudorf – engineering, mixing
- Ian Osborn – engineering assistance (tracks 1, 7, 9)
- João Carvahlo – mastering

== Chart performance ==
Chart (2009)	Peak position
Canadian Albums (Billboard)	6

== Certifications ==
Region	Certification
Canada (Music Canada)	Platinum
