= Live at Massey Hall =

Live at Massey Hall may refer to:

- Directions in Music: Live at Massey Hall, 2002 Herbie Hancock album
- Live at Massey Hall 1971, Neil Young album released in 2007
- Live at Massey Hall (Matthew Good album), 2008 live album by Matthew Good
- Live at Massey Hall (Blue Rodeo album), 2015

== See also ==
- Jazz at Massey Hall, 1953 album featuring Dizzy Gillespie, Charlie Parker, Bud Powell, Charles Mingus, and Max Roach
