= Casino (Blue Rodeo album) =

Studio album by Blue Rodeo
- Released: November 20, 1990
- Recorded: 1990
- Studios: Track Record, N. Hollywood; Capitol, Hollywood
- Genre: Country rock
- Length: 37:19
- Labels: Risque Disque, WEA
- Producer: Pete Anderson

Blue Rodeo chronology
Diamond Mine (1989)	Casino (1990)	Lost Together (1992)

Singles from Casino
- 1. "Til I Am Myself Again" Released: November 19, 1990; 2. "Trust Yourself" Released: February 18, 1991; 3. "What Am I Doing Here" Released: June 3, 1991; 4. "After the Rain" Released: June 22, 1991

Professional ratings
Review scores
Source	Rating
AllMusic	4/5 stars
Q Magazine	3/5 stars

Casino is the third studio album by Blue Rodeo. It was drummer Mark French's only album with the band. It was produced by Dwight Yoakam guitarist Pete Anderson. Clocking in at 37 minutes and 19 seconds in length, Casino was Blue Rodeo's shortest studio album until the release of A Merrie Christmas to You in 2016.

"Trust Yourself," "After the Rain," and, most significantly, "Til I Am Myself Again" were notable hit singles from the album.

== Commercial performance ==
Casino was album was the ninth-best selling Cancon album in Canada of 1990, despite only being available for the last month of the year. By December 1993, the album had sold 80,000 copies in the United States. The album was certified Double Platinum in Canada in 1994.

== Track listing ==
All songs by Greg Keelor and Jim Cuddy.

1. "Til I Am Myself Again" – 3:58
2. "What Am I Doing Here" – 3:08
3. "5 A.M. (A Love Song)" – 3:59
4. "Montreal" – 3:15
5. "Last Laugh" – 4:01
6. "Trust Yourself" – 3:49
7. "Two Tongues" – 4:22
8. "Time" – 3:36
9. "After the Rain" – 4:22
10. "You're Everywhere" – 2:49

=== Casino Demos ===
In 2012, as part of Blue Rodeo's 25th anniversary box set, Blue Rodeo: 1987 - 1993, a disc of demos from this album was released, including two previously unreleased songs.

1. "If I Had A Heart" — previously unreleased demo
2. "Always Have A Place For You" — previously unreleased demo
3. "Til I Am Myself Again"
4. "What Am I Doing Here"
5. "5 A.M. (A Love Song)"
6. "Montreal"
7. "Last Laugh"
8. "Trust Yourself"
9. "Two Tongues"
10. "Time"
11. "After the Rain"
12. "Photograph" — later released on Five Days in July
13. "Is It You" — later released on Lost Together

== Personnel ==
- Jim Cuddy – Guitar, Vocals
- Basil Donovan – Bass
- Mark French – Drums
- Greg Keelor – Guitar, Vocals
- Bob Wiseman – Organ, Harmonica, Piano, Accordion

Additional musicians/personnel

- Pete Anderson – Guitar, Mandolin, Producer
- Lenny Castro – Percussion
- Judy Clapp – Engineer
- Peter Doell – Engineer
- Jeff Donavan – Drums
- Skip Edwards – Organ
- Taras Prodaniuk – Bass

== Chart performance ==
Chart (1990)	Peak position
Canadian RPM Top Albums	6

== Certifications ==
Region	Certification	Certified units/sales
Canada (Music Canada)	2× Platinum	200,000^{^}
^{^} Shipments figures based on certification alone.
