= The Days In Between =

Studio album by Blue Rodeo
- Released: January 11, 2000
- Recorded: 1999
- Studios: Kingsway, New Orleans; The Bath House, Bath, Ontario
- Genre: Country rock
- Length: 49:31
- Label: Warner Music Canada
- Producers: Blue Rodeo, Trina Shoemaker

Blue Rodeo chronology
Just Like a Vacation (1999)	The Days In Between (2000)	Greatest Hits, Vol. 1 (2001)

Professional ratings
Review scores
Source	Rating
AllMusic	3/5 stars

The Days In Between is the eighth studio album by Blue Rodeo.

"Truscott" makes reference to Steven Truscott.

== Track listing ==
All tracks are written by Greg Keelor and Jim Cuddy.

No.	Title	Length
1.	"Cinema Song"	3:32
2.	"The Seeker"	3:46
3.	"Begging You to Let Me In"	3:29
4.	"Bitter Fruit"	3:47
5.	"Somebody Waits"	3:58
6.	"Andrea"	4:41
7.	"Sad Nights"	5:00
8.	"This Road"	4:18
9.	"The Days In Between"	3:28
10.	"Always Getting Better"	3:58
11.	"Rage"	5:58
12.	"Truscott"	3:27

== Personnel ==
Personnel taken from The Days In Between liner notes.

Blue Rodeo

- Jim Cuddy – vocals, guitar, piano (track 8)
- Greg Keelor – vocals, guitar
- Bazil Donovan – bass
- Glenn Milchem – drums, percussion
- James Gray – piano, Hammond organ, Rhodes piano, Wurlitzer, string samples
- Kim Deschamps – pedal steel guitar, Hawaiian guitar

Additional musicians

- Sarah Harmer – backing vocals (track 4)
- Travis Good – guitar (track 1)

Production

- Trina Shoemaker – production, recording, mixing
- Blue Rodeo – production, mixing
- Richard P. Eldridge – recording assistance, mix assistance
- Ken Friesen – recording assistance
- Greg Calbi – mastering

== Chart performance ==
Chart (2000)	Peak position
Canadian RPM Country Albums	5
Canadian RPM Top Albums	4

=== Year-end charts ===
Chart (2000)	Position
Canadian Albums (Nielsen SoundScan)	121

== Certifications ==
Region	Certification
Canada (Music Canada)	Gold
