= Small Miracles (album) =

Studio album by Blue Rodeo
- Released: September 25, 2007
- Recorded: 2007
- Studios: The Woodshed, Toronto
- Genres: Country rock; roots rock
- Length: 57:09
- Label: Warner Music Canada
- Producers: Blue Rodeo; Chris Shreenan-Dyck

Blue Rodeo chronology
Live in Stratford (2006)	Small Miracles (2007)	Blue Road (2008)

Small Miracles is the eleventh studio album released by Canadian country rock band Blue Rodeo, released on September 25, 2007.

== Reception ==
Professional ratings
Review scores
Source	Rating
AllMusic	4/5 stars

Although Small Miracles did not produce any high charting singles, such as 1990's "Til I Am Myself Again" which reached number 19 on the Billboard Modern Rock Tracks chart, critical reception was generally positive. AllMusic marveled that the album "sounds this consistently fresh and inspired coming 20 years after Blue Rodeo's debut.". The first single, C'mon, peaked at number 68 on the Canadian Hot 100. Although the second single, 3 Hours Away, did not chart, the following single, This Town, did.

In their review, Billboard noted that Blue Rodeo had not deviated away from their trademark roots rock sound of "twangy guitars and rootsy melodies", which is their "strength and weakness", though noted that the band do "mix it up" with the jazzy "Together", the Byrds-esque "C'mon" and the early 1970s feel of "Summer Girls".

== Track listing ==
All Songs by Jim Cuddy and Greg Keelor unless noted.

1. "So Far Away" – 3:48
2. "This Town" – 3:47
3. "Blue House" (Cuddy, Keelor, Damian Rogers) – 3:25
4. "3 Hours Away" – 3:38
5. "It Makes Me Wonder" – 5:43
6. "Summer Girls" – 4:10
7. "Together" – 4:59
8. "Mystic River" – 4:11
9. "Black Ribbon" – 6:45
10. "C'mon" – 3:16
11. "Small Miracles" – 3:27
12. "Beautiful" – 6:15
13. "Where I Was Before" – 3:45

== Personnel ==
Personnel taken from Small Miracles liner notes.

Blue Rodeo

- Jim Cuddy – vocals, guitar, piano on "This Town"
- Bazil Donovan – bass
- Bob Egan – pedal steel guitar, mandolin
- Greg Keelor – vocals, guitar
- Glenn Milchem – drums, percussion
- Bob Packwood – piano, organ

Additional musicians

- Anne Lindsay – violin on "Summer Girls", "This Town", and "Beautiful", string arrangements on "Summer Girls", "This Town", and "Small Miracles"
- Adele Armin – violin on "Summer Girls", "This Town", and "Beautiful"
- Richard Armin – cello on "Small Miracles", "Summer Girls", "This Town", and "Beautiful"
- Claudio Vena – viola on "Summer Girls", "This Town", and "Beautiful"
- Gary Pattison – French horn on "Where I Was Before"
- Doug Riley – string arrangements on "Beautiful"

Production

- Blue Rodeo – production, mixing, horn arrangement on "Where I Was Before"
- Chris Shreenan-Dyck – production, recording, mixing, horn arrangement on "Where I Was Before"
- Leon Zervos – mastering

== Chart performance ==
Chart (2007)	Peak position
Canadian Albums (Billboard)	5

== Certifications ==
Region	Certification
Canada (Music Canada)	Gold
