= A Merrie Christmas to You =

Studio album by Blue Rodeo
- Released: November 4, 2014
- Recorded: 2014
- Studio: The Woodshed, Toronto
- Genre: Christmas, country rock
- Length: 36:01
- Label: Warner Music Canada
- Producer: Blue Rodeo

Blue Rodeo chronology
In Our Nature (2013)	A Merrie Christmas to You (2014)	Live At Massey Hall (2015)

A Merrie Christmas to You is the fourteenth studio album, and the first Christmas album, released by Canadian country rock band Blue Rodeo on November 4, 2014. It contains eight covers of Christmas songs, along with two originals by Greg Keelor and Jim Cuddy. One original song, "Glad to Be Alive", was previously recorded on Blue Rodeo's 2002 album Palace of Gold.

With a total duration of 36 minutes and one second, A Merrie Christmas to You has the shortest runtime of any Blue Rodeo studio album.

== Track listing ==
No.	Title	Writer(s)	Length
1.	"Jesus Christ"	Alex Chilton	2:41
2.	"Have Yourself A Merry Little Christmas"	Ralph Blane; Hugh Martin	3:56
3.	"If We Make It Through December"	Merle Haggard	2:38
4.	"River"	Joni Mitchell	4:46
5.	"O Come All Ye Faithful"	Traditional	3:43
6.	"Getting Ready for Christmas Day"	Paul Simon	4:23
7.	"Glad to Be Alive"	Greg Keelor/Jim Cuddy	3:56
8.	"Home to You This Christmas"	Keelor/Cuddy	3:23
9.	"Song for a Winter's Night"	Gordon Lightfoot	3:08
10.	"Christmas Must Be Tonight"	Robbie Robertson	3:31
Total length:			36:01

== Personnel ==
Personnel taken from A Merrie Christmas to You liner notes.

Blue Rodeo

- Bazil Donovan – bass
- Bob Egan – pedal steel, mandolin
- Colin Cripps – guitar, backing vocals
- Glenn Milchem – drums
- Greg Keelor – vocals, guitar
- Jim Cuddy – vocals, guitar
- Michael Boguski – organ, electric piano

Additional musician

- Steve O'Connor – piano

Production

- Blue Rodeo – production
- Tim Vesely – recording, engineering, mixing
- João Carvalho – mastering
