= Jimmy Bowskill =

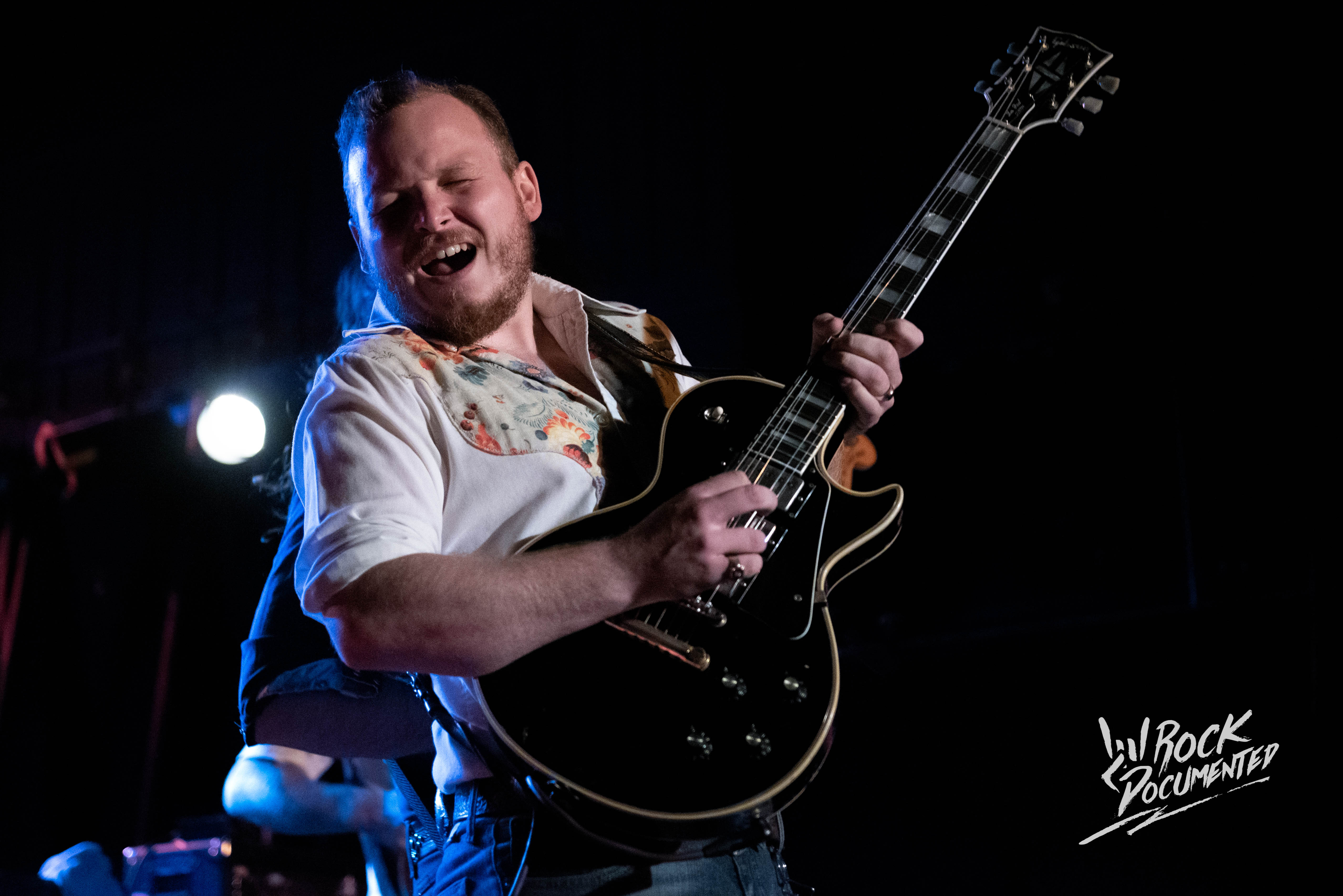

Background information
- Born: September 16, 1990 (age 36)
- Genres: Blues, Rock, Country
- Instruments: Guitar, Pedal Steel
- Years active: 2003-present
- Member of: Blue Rodeo
- Formerly of: The Sheepdogs

Jimmy Bowskill (born 16 September 1990) is a Canadian blues singer, guitarist and bassist.

== Early life ==
Bowskill grew up in Bailieboro, a small village near Peterborough, Ontario,where he learned to play guitar.

== Career ==
Bowskill began performing at a young age, and first played on stage at age 11 at Jeff Healey's club in Toronto. "They wouldn’t let an 11-year-old inside his club, so I started busking on the side-walk outside," he recalled in Guitar Player Magazine "Jeff heard about me, invited me in to play, and I did pretty well. I got a lot of gigs and exposure just from that one night."

Bowskill's second album, Soap Bars & Dog Ears, was nominated for a Juno Award when he was 14.

In 2005, he was presented with a Maple Blues Award as Best New Artist of the Year.

In 2010, he toured in Europe with Joe Bonamassa and Jeff Beck. He also performed locally at the Belleville Blues Festival.

In 2009, he released his first live album, Jimmy Bowskill Band Live.

In 2012, Bowskill introduced his album Back Number at the Kincardine Lighthouse Blues Festival. The album was recorded at Metalworks Studios in Mississauga, Ontario. He also performed at the Windsor International BluesFest and at the All-Canadian Jazz Festival in Port Hope with the Ganaraska Sheiks.

While on tour in 2009, the Jimmy Bowskill Band included Wayne Deadder on bass and Dan Neill on drums. In 2012, the band members were Ian McKeown on bass and Dan Reiff on drums.

From 2015-22, Bowskill was a member of the Canadian rock band, The Sheepdogs, playing lead, rhythm and pedal steel guitar.

In 2016, Blue Rodeo released their album, 1000 Arms, with Bowskill contributing on two tracks. By the time Blue Rodeo released their next album, Many a Mile, in 2021, Bowskill was a full member of the band.

In 2023, Bowskill released Too Many Roads with singer-songwriter Brittany Brooks, whom he later married.

In 2024, Bowskill released Blissful State of Mind with Brooks.

== Discography ==
=== Solo albums ===
- Old Soul (2003)
- Jimmy Bowskill (2007)
- Jimmy Bowskill Band Live (2009)
- Back Number (2012).

=== With the Jimmy Bowskill Band ===
- Soap Bars & Dog Ears (2004)

=== With Carlos del Junco ===
- Blues Etc... (2016)

=== With The Sheepdogs ===
- Changing Colours (2018)
- No Simple Thing (2021)
- Live At Lee's (2022)
- Outta Sight (2022)

=== With Blue Rodeo ===
- Many a Mile (2021)

=== As Brooks & Bowskill (With Brittany Brooks) ===
- Too Many Roads (2023)
- Blissful State of Mind (2024)
