= Five Days in July =

- US CD cover art

Studio album by Blue Rodeo
- Released: October 26, 1993 (Canada); September 27, 1994 (US)
- Recorded: July 1993
- Studios: the Comfort Sound Mobile, Toronto
- Genre: Country rock
- Length: 59:09
- Labels: WEA (Canada); Discovery (US)
- Producer: Blue Rodeo

Blue Rodeo chronology
Lost Together (1992)	Five Days in July (1993)	Nowhere to Here (1995)

Singles from Five Days in July
- 1. "5 Days in May" Released: 1993; 2. "Hasn't Hit Me Yet" Released: 1994; 3. "Bad Timing" Released: 1994; 4. "Dark Angel" Released: 1994; 5. "'Til I Gain Control Again" Released: 1994; 6. "Head Over Heels" Released: 1995

Professional ratings
Review scores
Source	Rating
AllMusic	4/5 stars

Five Days in July is the fifth studio album by Canadian country-rock band Blue Rodeo. It was released by WEA on October 26, 1993, in Canada and Discovery Records on September 27, 1994, in the United States. It is the band's first album to be released through WEA. The band's most commercially successful album, it has been certified six times platinum as of 2008.

The album was recorded on singer/guitarist Greg Keelor's farm in Southern Ontario in July 1993. While the band originally intended for the recordings to serve only as demos, they found that the songs had a warmth and spontaneity that warranted releasing the collection as an album. Guest musicians on the album include Sarah McLachlan, Colin Linden and Anne Bourne. This album was keyboardist James Gray's first album with the band.

The album is supposed to be a tribute to the Harvest-era Neil Young sound. "5 Days in May", "Hasn't Hit Me Yet" and "Bad Timing" were notable hit singles for the band.

== Track listing ==
All tracks are written by Greg Keelor and Jim Cuddy, except where noted.

No.	Title	Writer(s)	Length
1.	"5 Days in May"		7:12
2.	"Hasn't Hit Me Yet"		5:14
3.	"Bad Timing"		5:09
4.	"Cynthia"		4:40
5.	"Photograph"		4:10
6.	"What Is This Love"		6:16
7.	"English Bay"		3:20
8.	"Head Over Heels"		4:01
9.	"'Til I Gain Control Again"	Rodney Crowell	4:29
10.	"Dark Angel"		5:16
11.	"Know Where You Go/Tell Me Your Dream"		9:22
Total length:			59:09

== Personnel ==
Blue Rodeo

- Jim Cuddy – vocals, guitar, mandolin, harmonica
- Kim Deschamps – pedal & lap steel, mandolin, banjo
- Bazil Donovan – bass
- James Gray – keyboards, accordion
- Greg Keelor – vocals, guitar
- Glenn Milchem – drums

Additional performers

- Sarah McLachlan – vocals ("What Is This Love", "Dark Angel", and "Know Where You Go/Tell Me Your Dream"), piano ("Dark Angel", and "Tell Me Your Dream")
- Anne Bourne – cello ("What Is This Love", and "English Bay"), vocals ("Cynthia")
- Colin Linden – guitar ("Know Where You Go")
- Caroline Richardson – chimes, rainstick

Production

- Blue Rodeo – production
- Doug McClement – recording
- Peter Hamilton – recording
- John Whynot – mix engineering
- John Rodd – mix engineering assistance
- Greg Calbi – mastering

== Track trivia ==
- Singer/guitarist Jim Cuddy has said that "5 Days in May" was inspired by his sound engineer's practice of writing his wife's name in the sand whenever he finds himself on a beach. Cuddy noticed the engineer doing so while the band was on tour in New Zealand, and was inspired to write lyrics combining this story with the story of how Cuddy met his own wife.

== 30th Anniversary Reissue & Performances ==
The album was reissued on Vinyl for its 30th Anniversary on October 26, 2023. The group also performed numerous two-set shows performing the album in its entirety to commemorate the anniversary.

== Chart performance ==
Chart (1993)	Peak position
Canadian RPM Country Albums	3
Canadian RPM Top Albums	8

== Certifications ==
Region	Certification
Canada (Music Canada)	6× Platinum
