= In Our Nature (Blue Rodeo album) =

Studio album by Blue Rodeo
- Released: October 29, 2013
- Recorded: 2013
- Studio: Lost Cause, Peterborough, Ontario; The Woodshed, Toronto
- Genre: Country rock
- Length: 62:39
- Label: Warner Music Canada
- Producer: Blue Rodeo

Blue Rodeo chronology
Blue Rodeo: 1987 - 1993 (2012)	In Our Nature (2013)	A Merrie Christmas to You (2014)

Professional ratings
Review scores
Source	Rating
Allmusic	3/5 stars

In Our Nature is the thirteenth studio album released by Canadian country rock band Blue Rodeo, released on October 29, 2013. The album was recorded in Greg Keelor's farm house just outside Peterborough, Ontario, and at The Woodshed in Toronto.

== Track listing ==
All tracks are written by Greg Keelor and Jim Cuddy, unless otherwise noted.

No.	Title	Writer(s)	Length
1.	"New Morning Sun"		4:35
2.	"Wondering"		5:06
3.	"Over Me"		3:25
4.	"Never Too Late"		4:52
5.	"When The Truth Comes Out"		3:55
6.	"Paradise"		4:27
7.	"Tell Me Again"		3:53
8.	"Mattawa"		3:49
9.	"Made Your Mind Up"		5:25
10.	"In Our Nature"	Keelor/Cuddy; Damian Rogers	5:24
11.	"In The Darkness"	Keelor/Cuddy; Margaret Good	2:55
12.	"You Should Know"		3:25
13.	"Tara’s Blues"		4:28
14.	"Out Of The Blue"	Robbie Robertson	7:01
Total length:			62:39

== Personnel ==
Personnel taken from In Our Nature liner notes.

Blue Rodeo

- Bazil Donovan – bass
- Bob Egan – pedal steel guitar, mandolin, Dobro, banjo
- Colin Cripps – guitar, backing vocals
- Glenn Milchem – drums
- Greg Keelor – vocals, guitar
- Jim Cuddy – vocals, guitar, piano on "When The Truth Comes Out" and "Made Your Mind Up"
- Michael Boguski – piano, electric piano, organ

Additional musician

- Wayne Petti – backing vocals on "Out Of The Blue", "Wondering", and "Mattawa"

Production

- Blue Rodeo – production, mix assistance
- James McKenty – recording, engineering, mixing
- Greg Keelor – mixing
- Greg Calbi – mastering

== Chart performance ==
Chart (2013)	Peak position
Canadian Albums (Billboard)	2

== Certifications ==
Region	Certification
Canada (Music Canada)	Gold
