= What Am I Doing Here (song) =

Single by Blue Rodeo

from the album Casino
- Released: June 3, 1991
- Genre: Country rock
- Length: 3:08
- Label: Risque Disque
- Songwriters: Greg Keelor; Jim Cuddy
- Producer: Pete Anderson

Blue Rodeo singles chronology
"Trust Yourself" (1991)	"What Am I Doing Here" (1991)	"After the Rain" (1991)

"What Am I Doing Here" is a song written and recorded by Canadian country rock group Blue Rodeo. Released in June 1991, it was the third single from their third album, Casino. The song peaked at number 33 on the RPM Country Tracks chart, number 17 on the Adult Contemporary chart and number 41 on the Top Singles chart.

== Chart performance ==
Chart (1991)	Peak position
Canada Top Singles (RPM)	33
Canada Adult Contemporary (RPM)	17
Canada Country Singles (RPM)	41
