= Head over Heels (Blue Rodeo song) =

"Head Over Heels"

Single by Blue Rodeo

from the album Five Days in July
- Released: 1995
- Genre: Country rock
- Length: 4:01
- Label: Warner Music Canada
- Songwriters: Greg Keelor; Jim Cuddy
- Producer: Blue Rodeo

Blue Rodeo singles chronology
"'Til I Gain Control Again" (1994)	"Head Over Heels" (1995)	"Save Myself" (1995)

"Head Over Heels" is a song recorded by Canadian country rock group Blue Rodeo. It was released in 1995 as the sixth single from their fifth studio album, Five Days in July. It peaked at number 4 on the RPM Country Tracks chart and number 16 on the RPM Adult Contemporary Tracks chart in May 1995. It was reached the top 40 on the RPM Top Singles chart.

== Chart performance ==
Chart (1995)	Peak position
Canada Top Singles (RPM)	33
Canada Adult Contemporary (RPM)	16
Canada Country Singles (RPM)	4

=== Year-end charts ===
Chart (1995)	Position
Canada Country Tracks (RPM)	52
