= Diamond Mine (Blue Rodeo album) =

Studio album by Blue Rodeo
- Released: March 20, 1989
- Recorded: 1989
- Studios: Donlands Theatre; Kingsway Studio
- Genre: Country rock
- Length: 60:35
- Label: Risque Disque
- Producers: Malcolm Burn and Blue Rodeo

Blue Rodeo chronology
Outskirts (1987)	Diamond Mine (1989)	Casino (1990)

Singles from Diamond Mine
- 1. "Diamond Mine" Released: March 11, 1989; 2. "How Long" Released: June 10, 1989; 3. "House of Dreams" Released: October 15, 1989

Professional ratings
Review scores
Source	Rating
AllMusic	3/5 stars
Hi-Fi News & Record Review	A:1/1*

Diamond Mine is the second album by Blue Rodeo, released in 1989. It was recorded in 1989 at the Donlands Theatre in Toronto and mixed at the Kingsway Studio in New Orleans. It is the last Blue Rodeo album to feature original drummer Cleave Anderson and includes several instrumental interludes by Bob Wiseman on the majority of versions. Diamond Mine was the second best-selling Cancon album in Canada in 1989.

The band had decided to work with Malcolm Burn on the album after hearing the album Red Earth by Crash Vegas, which had been formed a year earlier by singer-songwriter Michelle McAdorey and Blue Rodeo member Colin Cripps. They hired Burn in December 1988, and set up a temporary recording studio at the abandoned Donlands Theatre in the east end of Toronto for its "roomy acoustics", in part inspired by the acoustics of The Trinity Session by the Cowboy Junkies. The recording was then mixed at the New Orleans studio of Daniel Lanois.

While touring to support the album in 1989, the band's manager John Caton quit abruptly as a result of a heart condition, effectively ending the label Risque Disque as well. The band hired Danny Goldberg as their new manager.

Jim Cuddy states that of all the Blue Rodeo albums, Diamond Mine has the "most honest expression of musical interest". Keelor has stated that in retrospect, the album has a "muddy, confused" sound.

== Track listing ==
All tracks are written by Greg Keelor and Jim Cuddy, except where noted.

Full Version
No.	Title	Writer(s)	Length
1.	"Swells"	Bob Wiseman	0:49
2.	"God and Country"		3:32
3.	"How Long"		3:59
4.	"Blues Piano"	Wiseman	0:43
5.	"Love and Understanding"		4:46
6.	"Girl of Mine"		4:34
7.	"Diamond Mine"		8:18
8.	"Now and Forever"		3:04
9.	"Percussive Piano"	Wiseman	1:07
10.	"House of Dreams"		4:39
11.	"Nice Try"		6:51
12.	"Fall in Line"		3:21
13.	"One Day"		3:17
14.	"Florida"		3:40
15.	"Fuse"		3:40
16.	"The Ballad of the Dime Store Greaser and the Blonde Mona Lisa"		3:24
Total length:			60:35

Truncated Version
No.	Title	Length
1.	"God and Country"	3:32
2.	"How Long"	3:59
3.	"Love and Understanding"	4:46
4.	"Girl of Mine"	4:34
5.	"Diamond Mine"	8:18
6.	"Now and Forever"	3:04
7.	"House of dreams"	4:39
8.	"Nice Try"	6:51
9.	"Fall in Line"	3:21
10.	"One Day"	3:17
11.	"Florida"	3:40
12.	"Fuse"	3:40
13.	"The Ballad of the Dime Store Greaser and the Blonde Mona Lisa"	3:24
Total length:		57:56

For example, see the 1989 Australian releases by WEA on LP (256268-1) and cassette tape (256268-4). Some editions of the album show the truncated tracklist on the back cover, but actually contain the full version.

== Personnel ==
Blue Rodeo

- Cleave Anderson – drums
- Jim Cuddy – guitar, vocals, bongos
- Bazil Donovan – bass, bongos
- Greg Keelor – guitar, vocals, bongos
- Bob Wiseman – piano, organ, bongos, accordion, the grinder

Additional personnel

- Malcolm Burn – production, mixing
- Blue Rodeo – production, mixing
- Zimbie – engineering (all except "Diamond Mine" and "Now and Forever")
- Doug McClement – engineering assistance, engineering ("Diamond Mine" and "Now and Forever")
- Mark Lambert – engineering assistance
- Brad Ormsby – engineering assistance
- Brant Scott – production assistance
- Mark Howard – mix engineering, bongos

== Chart performance ==
Chart (1989)	Peak position
Canadian RPM Country Albums	2
Canadian RPM Top Albums	4

== Awards ==
Blue Rodeo won the Juno Award for Group of the Year in 1990 despite neither the album or any song from it being nominated for an award.

== Certifications ==
Region	Certification
Canada (Music Canada)	3× Platinum
