= Maïa Davies =

Canadian singer

Maïa Davies is a Canadian singer-songwriter from Montreal, Quebec. She is most noted for her album Lovers' Gothic, which won the Juno Award for Adult Contemporary Album of the Year at the Juno Awards of 2025.

Formerly a member of the folk-rock band Ladies of the Canyon, she released her first solo album Héritage in 2012. The album was recorded and released as an outlet for French language songs she had written while on tour with the band. After the band's breakup she turned to co-writing songs with other artists, including Serena Ryder, Jill Barber, Monster Truck, One Bad Son, Clayton Bellamy and Mother Mother, before releasing her second album Plus que vive in 2018.

Lovers' Gothic, her first English-language solo album, was released in 2024.

== Discography ==
- Héritage - 2012
- Plus que vive - 2018
- Lovers' Gothic - 2024
