= Outskirts (album) =

Studio album by Blue Rodeo
- Released: March 26, 1987
- Recorded: 1986–1987
- Studio: McClear Place, Toronto
- Genre: Country rock
- Length: 49:06
- Label: Risqué Disque
- Producer: Terry Brown

Blue Rodeo chronology
Outskirts (1987)	Diamond Mine (1989)

Singles from Outskirts
- 1. "Outskirts of Life" Released: April 1987; 2. "Try" Released: June 1987; 3. "Day After Day (Rose-Coloured Glasses)" Released: January 1988; 4. "Rebel" Released: April 30, 1988

Professional ratings
Review scores
Source	Rating
AllMusic	3/5 stars

Outskirts is the debut studio album by Canadian country rock group Blue Rodeo, released in March 1987 through Risqué Disque. The singles "Try" and "Rose-Coloured Glasses" were hits in Canada, where "Outskirts" and "Rebel" also made the singles charts.

To mark the 25th anniversary of the album, Blue Rodeo released a two-LP vinyl remixed edition, Outskirts Remix, on November 27, 2012.

On the thirtieth anniversary of the album's release, Jim Cuddy posted the following message on the band's website: "The first night we started to make Outskirts was also the night my wife Rena went into labour with our first child Devin. So needless to say it was an unforgettable night. The record came out to a deafening silence. Not a single radio station played the first single, 'Outskirts'. We sold 5000 records which we thought was amazing but were told we would be dropped if nothing else happened. So much has happened since then but I still hold onto the feelings from those early days of tearing it up in a club with nothing to lose. We could never have dreamed of being where we are today and looking back on 30 years of playing music together. Sometimes life surprises you."

== Track listing ==
All tracks are written by Greg Keelor and Jim Cuddy.

No.	Title	Lead vocals	Length
1.	"Heart Like Mine"	Keelor; Cuddy	4:38
2.	"Rose-Coloured Glasses"	Keelor	4:25
3.	"Rebel"	Cuddy	3:47
4.	"Joker's Wild"	Keelor	4:02
5.	"Piranha Pool"	Keelor	6:27
6.	"Outskirts"	Keelor	4:45
7.	"Underground"	Cuddy	5:05
8.	"5 Will Get You Six"	Keelor; Cuddy	4:22
9.	"Try"	Cuddy	4:03
10.	"Floating"	Keelor	7:32
Total length:			49:06

== Personnel ==
Personnel taken from Outskirts liner notes.

Blue Rodeo

- Cleave Anderson – drums
- Jim Cuddy – guitar, vocals
- Bazil Donovan – bass
- Greg Keelor – guitar, vocals
- Bob Wiseman – piano, Acetone

Technical personnel

- Terry Brown – production
- Mike Jones – engineering
- Paul Shubat – engineering assistance
- Bob Ludwig – mastering
- John Caton – art direction
- William Deacon – photography

== Chart performance ==
Chart (1987)	Peak position
Canadian RPM Top Albums	20

== Certifications ==
Region	Certification
Canada (Music Canada)	4× Platinum
