= 'Til I Gain Control Again =

1982 single by Crystal Gayle

"'Till I Gain Control Again" is a country song written by Rodney Crowell and originally recorded by Emmylou Harris in 1975. The song was included on her 1975 studio album Elite Hotel. The song is widely known by the No. 1 single version recorded by Crystal Gayle on her 1982 album, True Love.

== Composition ==
Rodney Crowell wrote the song while working for Jerry Reed's publishing company. At the time, he was hanging out with noted songwriters Townes Van Zandt, Guy Clark, and Steve Runkle, and wanted to show his own songwriting skill.

In retrospect, Crowell expresses regret at rhyming "been" with "can" in the lyric "What you've seen is what I've been/There is nothing I could hide from you/You see me better than I can." Had he written the song later in his career, Crowell says he would have spent time to find a hard rhyme. Crowell marvels when people tell him this song is their favorite of his. Crowell's version was released on his third (self titled) album in 1981.

Crowell wrote the song back-to-back with "Song for the Life" (recorded on his debut album Ain't Living Long Like This) in the 1970s and says both are a "projection into the future that I later lived through . . . and it was exactly like I predicted."

== Crystal Gayle version ==
"'Til I Gain Control Again"

Single by Crystal Gayle

from the album True Love
- B-side: "Easier Said Than Done"
- Released: October 27, 1982
- Genre: Country
- Length: 3:56
- Label: Elektra
- Songwriter: Rodney Crowell
- Producers: Jimmy Bowen; Allen Reynolds

Crystal Gayle singles chronology
"You and I" (1982)	"'Til I Gain Control Again" (1982)	"Everything I Own" (1983)

In 1982, the song would be recorded by Crystal Gayle and her recording was her tenth number one on the country chart. Her recording would go to number one for one week and spend a total of twelve weeks on the chart. A music video was filmed for the song.

=== Charts ===
==== Weekly charts ====
Chart (1982–1983)	Peak position
US Hot Country Songs (Billboard)	1
Canadian RPM Country Tracks	12

==== Year-end charts ====
Chart (1983)	Position
US Hot Country Songs (Billboard)	22

== Blue Rodeo version ==
"'Til I Gain Control Again"

Single by Blue Rodeo

from the album Five Days in July
- Released: 1994
- Genre: Country rock
- Length: 4:30
- Label: Warner Music Canada
- Songwriter: Rodney Crowell
- Producer: Blue Rodeo

Blue Rodeo singles chronology
"Dark Angel" (1994)	"'Til I Gain Control Again" (1994)	"Head over Heels" (1995)

In 1993, the song was covered by Canadian country rock band Blue Rodeo for their album Five Days in July. Released as a single in 1994, the song peaked at number 24 on the RPM Country Tracks chart.

=== Chart performance ===
Chart (1994–1995)	Peak position
Canada Country Singles (RPM)	24

== Other versions ==
Waylon Jennings covered the song on his 1977 album, Ol' Waylon. Willie Nelson covered it on his 1978 live album Willie and Family Live. Jerry Jeff Walker also covered the song in 1978 on his Contrary to Ordinary album. Bobby Bare covered the song in 1979. Crowell recorded his own version of the song as well in 1981 on his self-titled album. The eclectic band This Mortal Coil covered it on their 1991 album Blood. Van Morrison covered it on his 2006 Pay the Devil album. Alison Krauss recorded it in 2016 as part of a tribute album to Harris titled The Life & Songs of Emmylou Harris.
