= Cleave Anderson =

Canadian drummer

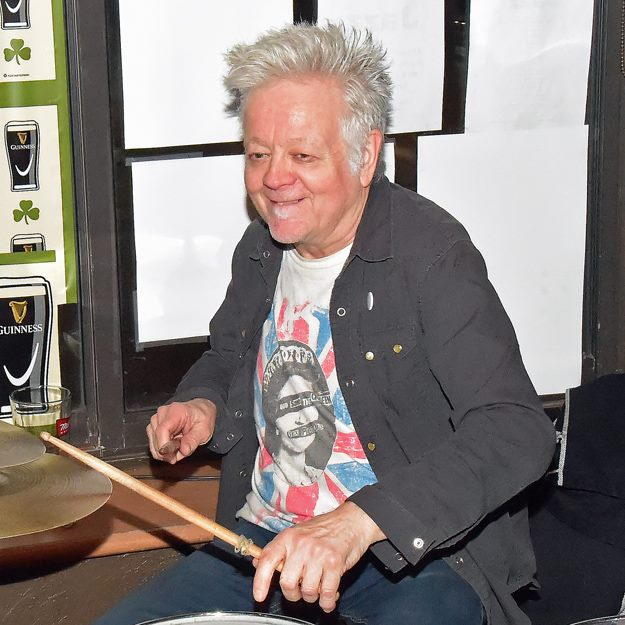
- Cleave Anderson performs at Salty Dog Bar & Grill in Toronto, Ontario on March 15, 2019

Background information
- Genres: punk rock, country rock, rockabilly, blues
- Occupations: Musician, songwriter
- Instrument: Drums
- Years active: 1968–present
- Formerly of: Blue Rodeo; Battered Wives

Cleave Anderson is a Canadian punk rock, alt. country, rock, pop, etc drummer. Anderson has played and recorded with several well-known groups, including Blue Rodeo, Battered Wives, Viletones, Sherry Kean, Forgotten Rebels, and the Beat Club.

== Career ==
While in high school, Anderson played drums in bands that performed at frat parties and church drop-in centres. After high school, Cleave played around Ontario in cover bands. In 1974, Anderson joined Canada Post as a letter carrier when music failed to pay the bills.

In 1976, after visiting Max's Kansas City and CBGB and seeing the Ramones, Anderson became interested in the new punk movement. Returning to Toronto, Anderson eventually joined Battered Wives one of a few new bands on the scene. The band recorded their debut album and opened for Elvis Costello on his first tour in North America. On leaving Battered Wives, he played and recorded with local Punk Rock groups such as Tyranna, Forgotten Rebels, and bubblegum punk pioneers the Way Outs.

In 1980, as the first wave of punk rock faded, Anderson joined new wave R&B band, The Sharks. He would later play with The Shark's bassist Basil Donovan in Blue Rodeo. Around the same time, Anderson also played with blues artists David Wilcox and Colin Linden. Anderson returned to roots music doing gigs with Handsome Ned, who had started playing country and rockabilly in Toronto's Queen St. West artist community.

In 1984, Anderson started rehearsals with Blue Rodeo. Anderson joined the group and is heard on their first two albums, Outskirts and Diamond Mine. Despite Blue Rodeos's success, Anderson left the band in late 1989 to raise a family and return to Canada Post.

After leaving Blue Rodeo, Anderson continued to play with local songwriters and then reconnecting with original punksters Screamin' Sam. In 1997, he joined the John Borra Band. In 2004, Anderson formed old school punk rock revivalists the Screwed, who have recorded two albums. In 2011, Sid's Kids were formed to back up many of the Canadian punk originators and the project is ongoing. He has toured with the Viletones' Steven Leckie, Cheetah Chrome of the Dead Boys, and Walter Lure of Johnny Thunders' Heartbreakers, among others. In 2025, he joined Toronto Rockabilly artist Evil Elvis, and can be heard on the compilation album Evilest Elvis.
