= Lost Together (Blue Rodeo album) =

Studio album by Blue Rodeo
- Released: July 7, 1992
- Recorded: 1992
- Genre: Country rock
- Length: 66:15
- Label: Risque Disque
- Producers: Blue Rodeo, Peter Doell

Blue Rodeo chronology
| Casino (1990) | Lost Together (1992) | Five Days in July (1993) |

Singles from Lost Together
- 1. "Lost Together" Released: 1992; 2. "Rain Down On Me" Released: 1992; 3. "Angels" Released: 1993; 4. "Flying" Released: 1993; 5. "Already Gone" Released: 1993

Professional ratings
Review scores
| Source | Rating |
|---|---|
| Allmusic | 4/5 stars |

Lost Together (stylized as lostogether) is the fourth studio album by Blue Rodeo. It was Bob Wiseman's last album with the band, and was the first to feature drummer Glenn Milchem, and steel guitar player Kim Deschamps.

Notable hits from the album included "Rain Down on Me," "Flying," "Already Gone" and the title track.

The album was a Juno Award nominee for Album of the Year at the Juno Awards of 1993.

During the COVID-19 pandemic in Canada in 2020, CBC Music organized and released a "Great Canadian Singalong" of the title track, with several hundred Canadians submitting video of themselves singing the song in their homes for inclusion in the final mix.

== Songs ==
The album's opening track, "Fools Like You", is a song Greg Keelor wrote about his disgust about continued abuse of Indigenous people in Canada. Keelor explained in a 1992 interview: "It's about how atrocious our European forefathers were in the taking of this land and how the tradition is still continued in our present day. It was written after the Oka thing. I was freaked out and disgusted by it."

"Restless" is a song that was written about the demise of social welfare programs in America during the Ronald Reagan and George Bush administrations.

== Track listing ==
All songs by Greg Keelor and Jim Cuddy.

1. "Fools Like You" – 4:31
2. "Rain Down On Me" – 4:43
3. "Restless" – 3:54
4. "Western Skies" – 4:19
5. "The Big Push" – 4:25
6. "Willin' Fool" – 6:40
7. "Already Gone" – 5:15
8. "Flying" – 4:11
9. “Lost Together" – 5:20
10. "Where Are You Now" – 5:33
11. "Last to Know" – 5:33
12. "Is it You" – 3:52
13. "Angels" – 7:59

== Chart performance ==
| Chart (1992) | Peak position |
|---|---|
| Canadian RPM Top Albums | 3 |

== Certifications ==
| Region | Certification | Certified units/sales |
|---|---|---|
| Canada (Music Canada) | 2× Platinum | 200,000^{^} |
^{^} Shipments figures based on certification alone.
