= Haunted Woman =

Studio album by Ladies of the Canyon
- Released: June 1, 2010
- Genre: Country
- Length: 45:12
- Label: Kindling/Warner Music Canada

Ladies of the Canyon chronology
Haunted Woman (2010)	Diamond Heart (2013)

Singles from Haunted Woman
- 1. "Follow Me Down" Released: March 15, 2010; 2. "Maybe Baby" Released: September 13, 2010; 3. "Give It Again" Released: January 31, 2011

Haunted Woman is the debut studio album by Canadian country music group Ladies of the Canyon. It was released on June 1, 2010, by Kindling/Warner Music Canada. The first single was "Follow Me Down."

== Track listing ==
No.	Title	Length
1.	"Follow Me Down"	3:52
2.	"Give It Again"	4:03
3.	"Maybe Baby"	3:29
4.	"Haunted Woman"	4:45
5.	"Hard to Find Love"	3:33
6.	"No Deliverance"	3:48
7.	"Forget Me"	3:13
8.	"Poet"	3:58
9.	"Lonely Town"	3:48
10.	"War and Glory"	3:37
11.	"Every Minute"	3:34
12.	"Goodbye Gold and Blue"	3:32
