= Small Miracles (book series) =

Small Miracles is a series of inspirational books written by Yitta Halberstam and Judith Leventhal. Titles include:

- Small miracles : extraordinary coincidences from everyday life (1997)
- Small miracles II : heartwarming gifts of extraordinary coincidences (1998)
- Small miracles of love & friendship : remarkable coincidences of warmth and devotion (1999)
- Small miracles for women : extraordinary coincidences of heart and spirit (2000)
- Small miracles for the Jewish heart : extraordinary coincidences from yesterday and today (2002)
- Small miracles for families : extraordinary coincidences that reaffirm our deepest ties (2003)
- Small Miracles of the Holocaust: Extraordinary Coincidences of Faith, Hope, and Survival (2008)
- Small Miracles from Beyond: Dreams, Visions and Signs that Link Us to the Other Side (2014?)
- Small Miracles is a web series starring Judd Hirsch based on the book by Yitta Halberstam and Judith Leventhal (Now on You Tube)
- Changing course : women's inspiring stories of menopause, midlife, and moving forward (2004) (Technically not part of the Small Miracles Series)
