= Ladies of the Canyon (band) =

Canadian band

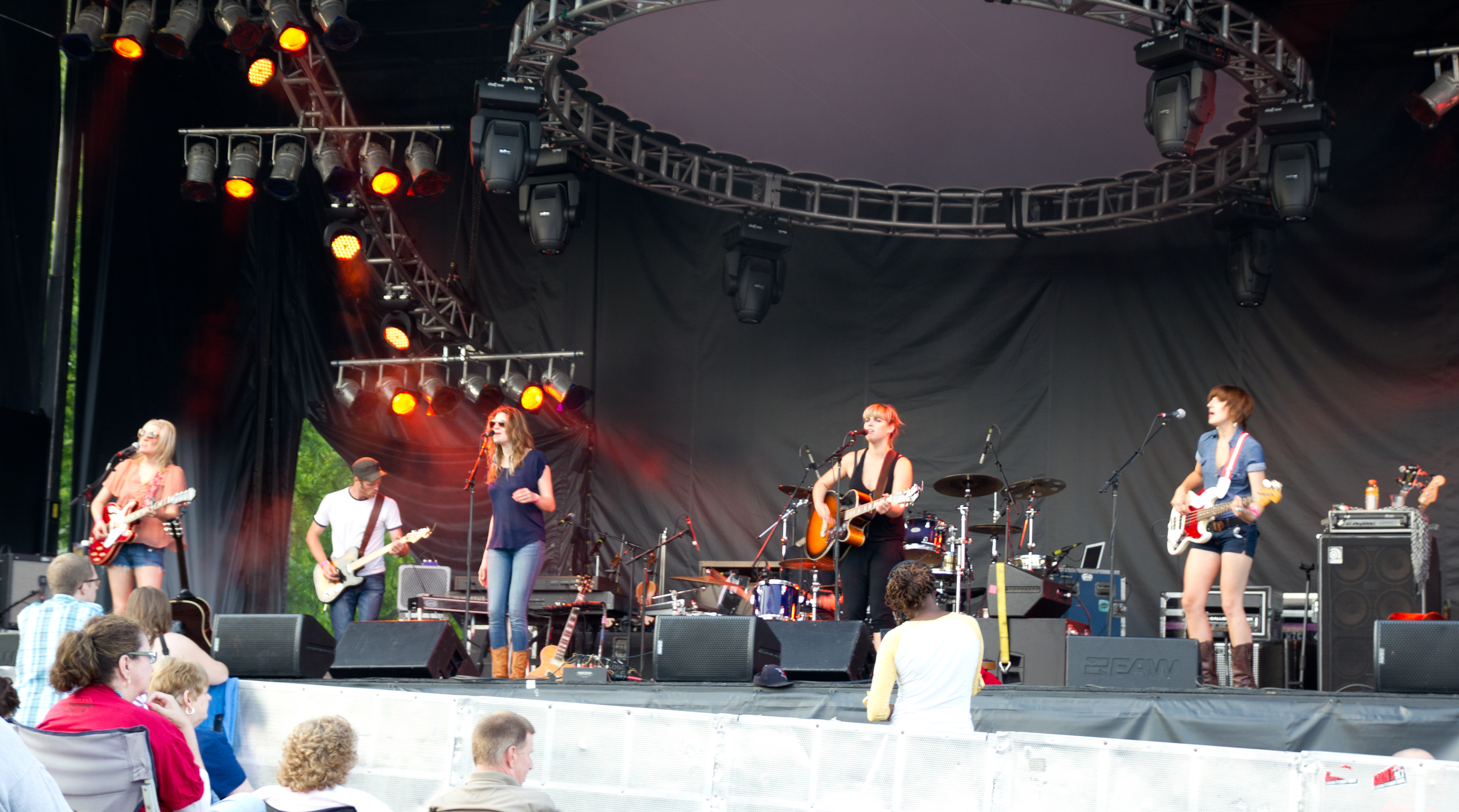
- 2011 Burlington Music Festival

Background information
- Origin: Montreal, Quebec, Canada
- Genres: Roots/Rock
- Years active: 2006-present
- Labels: Warner Music Canada
- Members: Tara Martin; Maïa Davies; Jasmine Bleile; Anna Ruddick
- Past members: Senja Sargeant
- Website: ladiesofthecanyon.com

Ladies of the Canyon is a Canadian band from Montreal, Quebec, composed of Tara Martin, Maïa Davies, Jasmine Bleile and Anna Ruddick. Their sound encompasses a melding of influences, such as roots, rock, country, and Americana. The group has released two albums.

== History ==
Founded in 2005, Ladies of the Canyon began their career playing small venues in Montreal’s popular Mile-End neighbourhood. At the time their music consisted mainly of "countrified" 1970s Californian soft-rock sound; over time their musical style expanded to include classic folk and contemporary rock.

The group released their first studio album, Haunted Woman, in 2010 through Kindling/Warner Music Canada. In the three years following this release, Ladies of the Canyon appeared on stage with Broken Social Scene and The Dears, were nominated for a Canadian Country Music Association award. The band worked with producer Mark Howard to record their second album, Diamond Heart. In 2012, during the recording of this album, Sargeant was replaced by drummer Tara Martin. Diamond Heart was released in September, 2013.

In 2014 the Ladies of the Canyon toured with the Barenaked Ladies.

== Solo careers ==
Maia Davies released her debut album in 2010, Héritage, using the mononym "Maïa" (now known as Maia Lily, stylized as Maïa Lily). Jasmine Bleile released her first solo album under the name Satellītes on November 17, 2018. Senja Sargeant released her selftitled EP, produced by Shane Alexander, in 2022 and celebrated the event with a release party in the venue Bitterzoet in Amsterdam where Shane played along in her band.

== Discography ==
=== Studio albums ===
Title	Album details
Haunted Woman	Release date: June 1, 2010; Label: Kindling/Warner Music Canada
Diamond Heart	Release date: September 24, 2013; Label: Warner Music Canada

=== Singles ===
Year	Single	Album
2010	"Follow Me Down"	Haunted Woman
2010	"Maybe Baby"	Haunted Woman
2011	"Give It Again"	Haunted Woman
2013	"Diamond Heart"	Diamond Heart
2013	"You and All Your Famous Friends"	Diamond Heart

=== Music videos ===
Year	Video
2010	"Follow Me Down"
2010	"Maybe Baby"
2014	"Let's Take the Night"

== Awards and nominations ==
Year	Association	Category	Result
2011	Canadian Country Music Association	Rising Star	Nominated
