= John Whynot =

- Born: April 4, 1959 (age 67); Calgary, Alberta, Canada
- Genres: Rock; Alt Country; Folk; Roots music Blues
- Instruments: Guitar, Keyboards, Producer, Arranger, Engineer
- Years active: 1979–present
- Website: myspace.com/producerjohnwhynot

John Whynot (born April 4, 1959) is a Canadian musician, producer, engineer, film score mixer and composer. Originally based in Toronto, since 1989 he has resided in Los Angeles.

He has worked with a wide variety of artists including Bruce Cockburn, Blue Rodeo, Lucinda Williams, Kathleen Edwards. Colin James, Change of Heart, Loreena McKennitt, Big Wreck, The Pukka Orchestra and Jim Cuddy.

He has also recorded and mixed many notable film scores, including Last of the Mohicans, which won an Academy Award for sound in 1993, Austin Powers: International Man of Mystery, Austin Powers: The Spy Who Shagged Me, Ronin and Stigmata. As a composer he has several film score credits, including You Got Nothin' and Sleep Murder.
