= Til I Am Myself Again =

Single by Blue Rodeo

from the album Casino
- Released: November 19, 1990
- Genre: Country rock
- Length: 3:58
- Label: Risque Disque
- Songwriters: Greg Keelor; Jim Cuddy
- Producer: Pete Anderson

Blue Rodeo singles chronology
"Love and Understanding" (1990)	"Til I Am Myself Again" (1990)	"Trust Yourself" (1991)

"Til I Am Myself Again" is a song written and recorded by Canadian country rock group Blue Rodeo. Released in November 1990, it was the first single from their album Casino. The song reached number 1 on the RPM Country Tracks chart in March 1991.

== Content ==
The song is composed in the key of G major with a moderate tempo. The verses follow the chord pattern G-C-G-D/F♯-Em-C-D twice, while the chorus uses the chord pattern Am-Bm-C-D four times before ending on a G chord. An uncredited review of Casino in the Grand Junction Daily Sentinel compared the song's sound to that of The Byrds, noting the use of twelve-string guitar in creating such a sound. The review also said that the song had a "majestic melody" and that both it and "What Am I Doing Here" off the same album were "musical triumphs over adversity with classic hooks."

== Chart performance ==
Chart (1990–1991)	Peak position
Canada Top Singles (RPM)	3
Canada Adult Contemporary (RPM)	2
Canada Country Singles (RPM)	1
US Alternative Airplay (Billboard)	19
US Mainstream Rock Tracks (Billboard)	37

=== Year-end charts ===
Chart (1991)	Position
Canada Top Singles (RPM)	43
Canada Adult Contemporary Tracks (RPM)	24
Canada Country Tracks (RPM)	40
