= Try (Blue Rodeo song) =

Single by Blue Rodeo

from the album Outskirts
- Released: June 1987
- Genre: Country rock
- Length: 4:03
- Label: Risque Disque
- Songwriter(s): Greg Keelor; Jim Cuddy
- Producer(s): Terry Brown

Blue Rodeo singles chronology
"Outskirts" (1987)	"Try" (1987)	"Rose Coloured Glasses" (1988)

"Try" is a song written by Greg Keelor and Jim Cuddy, and recorded by Canadian country rock group Blue Rodeo. Released in June 1987, it was the second single from their debut album, Outskirts, and took about four months to break the top 10 RPM charts. Considered one of the band's most enduring and beloved signature songs, the song peaked at number 1 on the RPM Country Tracks chart, number 3 on the Adult Contemporary chart and number 6 on the Top Singles chart.

At the 1989 Juno Awards, "Try" was named Single of the Year and Video of the Year.

== Background ==
Even prior to the release of Outskirts, the song already had a reputation as the highlight of the band's live performances in Toronto's live music clubs, with fan demand often leading it to it being performed two or even three times per show.

Keelor would, however, later describe the song's production as having a very 1980s sound, "like Tears for Fears were backing us up". He stated that the album's production by Terry Brown saw the band capitulating to production decisions that Keelor later regretted, including the snare drum and a "cheesy" organ sound, both of which he toned down when remastering the album for the Blue Rodeo: 1987 - 1993 box set in 2012.

== Music video ==
Michelle McAdorey, a singer-songwriter who would later achieve prominence with her own band, Crash Vegas, appears in the song's video as a woman walking barefoot through a variety of settings. McAdorey was the girlfriend of Blue Rodeo's Greg Keelor when the video was made.

== Chart performance ==
Chart (1987)	Peak position
Canadian RPM Adult Contemporary	3
Canadian RPM Country Tracks	1
Canadian RPM Top Singles	6
