= Colin Cripps =

Canadian musician and record producer

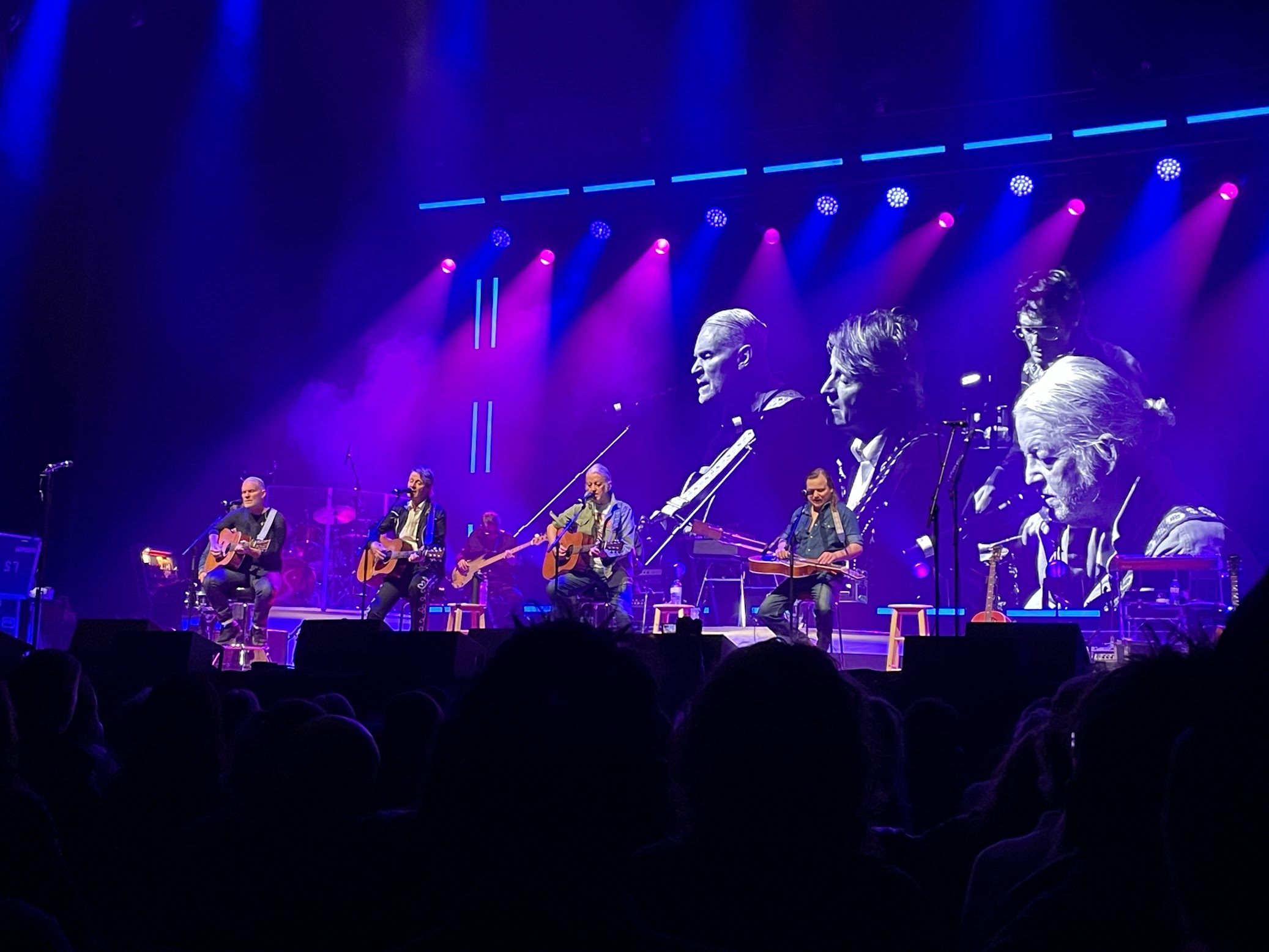
- Colin Cripps (left) performing with Blue Rodeo on November 20th, 2025

Background information
- Born: January 26, 1961 (age 65); Hamilton, Ontario, Canada
- Origin: Toronto, Ontario
- Genres: Rock
- Occupations: Musician, producer
- Instrument: Guitar
- Years active: 1988–present

Colin Cripps (born January 26, 1961) is a Canadian musician and record producer.

== Career ==
Colin Cripps is a Canadian guitarist and member of Blue Rodeo and the Jim Cuddy Band. He has been a member and producer of the bands Crash Vegas and Junkhouse.

He has also produced and written material for Kathleen Edwards, Big Wreck, Tom Wilson, Colin James, Craig Cardiff, Jim Cuddy, Blackie and the Rodeo Kings, Stephen Fearing, Oh Susanna, The Headstones, Sarah McLachlan, Justin Rutledge, Bryan Adams, Collin Herring, Andrew Walker, and Dawn Langstroth. He has also worked in film, composing the music for Wrestling with Shadows, The Life and Death of Owen Hart, Machine Gun, and Planet Storm.

In 2007, Cripps appeared with Bryan Adams, playing guitar and backing vocals on a BBC special in celebration of the 40th Anniversary of The Beatles, Sgt. Pepper's Lonely Hearts Club Band. In 2006-2007, Cripps played guitar on the Bryan Adams record 11, which was released internationally in March 2008.

Cripps produced and played guitar on Kathleen Edwards' second album Back to Me in 2005 (released on Rounder Records), and on her third album Asking for Flowers, released in 2008.

Cripps has co-produced and played guitar on all of Jim Cuddy's solo albums to date.

In 2009, Cripps produced and played guitar on Ladies of the Canyon's Haunted Woman (released on Warner Canada in June 2010) produced and played guitar on the British band's Count to Fire (released independently summer 2010).

As well in 2009, Cripps played on sessions for The Wailin' Jennys (album released March 2011), Alistair Griffin, Ruth Moody (released late 2010), and Andrew Cole (released in 2010).

In 2010, Cripps worked as session guitarist on Sarah McLachlan's Laws of Illusion (released internationally in June 2010), as well starting production and guitar on upcoming releases for Gavin Slate and Cindy Doire. In December 2010, Cripps produced three songs for Ladies of the Canyon (one written by and including guitar from Ron Sexsmith) as a Christmas song sampler. In 2011, Cripps worked on releases for Bryan Adams, Cindy Doire, The Coppertone, Ian Thornley, and Paul Reddick.

In April 2012, Cripps produced Paul Reddick's CD, Wishbone. Cripps also produced a record for The Cooper Brothers, titled Southbound, which was released in 2013.

Cripps joined Blue Rodeo as a full member in 2013, due to Greg Keelor's inability to play electric guitar live anymore due to ear issues. Blue Rodeo released In Our Nature in October 2013, with Cripps contributing guitar/backing vocals on his first album as a member of the band. As a member of Blue Rodeo, Cripps was presented with the 2014 Governor General's Performing arts lifetime achievement award in May 2014. Cripps had previously played guitar as a guest on Blue Rodeo's 1997 album Tremolo. Additionally, he co-wrote the song "No Miracle No Dazzle" on that album.

Cripps released his first solo album, titled Stormy Northern Days, in 2013.

In 2015, Cripps, (along with "Champagne" James Robertson), and known as "C and C Surf Factory" released the surf guitar instrumental album Garage City through Six Shooter Records. A fully instrumental album of original tunes, it was written and produced by Cripps and Robertson over a year of recording at the Bathouse Studio in Bath, Ontario.
