= Blue Rodeo =

Canadian country rock band

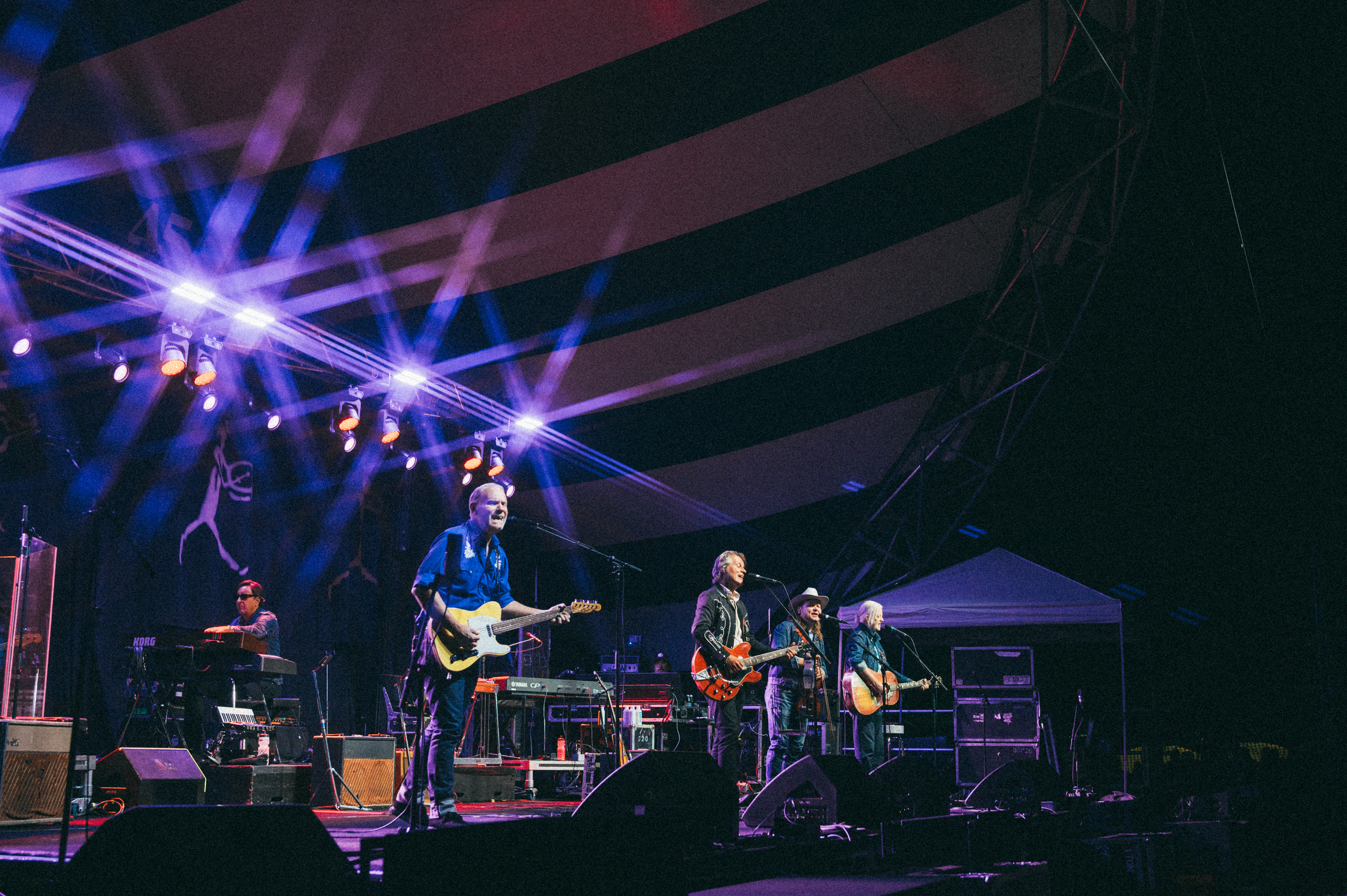
- Blue Rodeo in 2024

Background information
- Origin: Toronto, Ontario, Canada
- Genres: Pop rock; Rock; Country; Alternative country; Alternative rock; Roots rock; Folk rock; Americana
- Years active: 1984–present
- Labels: WEA, Warner Music Group, Rounder
- Members: Jim Cuddy; Bazil Donovan; Greg Keelor; Glenn Milchem; Mike Boguski; Colin Cripps; Jimmy Bowskill
- Past members: Cleave Anderson; Bob Wiseman; Mark French; Kim Deschamps; James Gray; Bob Packwood; Bob Egan
- Website: bluerodeo.com

Blue Rodeo is a Canadian rock band formed in 1984 in Toronto, Ontario. They have released 16 full-length studio albums, four live recordings, one greatest hits album, and two video/DVDs, along with multiple solo albums, side projects, and collaborations.

== History ==
=== Founding ===
High school friends Jim Cuddy and Greg Keelor began playing music professionally together after completing university. They put together several bands without commercial success in the late 1970s, releasing a single as Hi-Fi's in 1980.

Cuddy and Keelor moved to New York City in the early 1980s to further their music careers. There, they met keyboardist and fellow Canadian Bob Wiseman, who, at that time, was working as a producer. Upon returning to Toronto in the summer of 1984, the trio decided to form a band. The name "Blue Rodeo" had already been chosen for the new group when they met former David Wilcox drummer Cleave Anderson and asked him to join. Anderson, in turn, recommended his former bandmate in The Sharks, bassist Bazil Donovan, and the new band's lineup was essentially set. On February 8, 1985, Blue Rodeo played their first show together at The Rivoli in Toronto; one week later, they performed at Handsome Ned's "Honky Tonk Heart."

=== Career ===
The band earned a following in Toronto and was signed to Canadian independent record label Risque Disque. They entered the studio in 1986 with Rush producer Terry Brown and recorded several songs that would comprise Blue Rodeo's debut album, Outskirts. Released in March 1987, Outskirts met with moderate success in Canada until "Try" was released as a single in October of that year. The single was an immediate hit, going to number one on the RPM Country Tracks chart and number six on the RPM Top Singles chart, establishing Blue Rodeo as one of Canada's top new bands and carrying Outskirts to 4× Platinum status in sales.

In 1992, the band's song "After the Rain," written by Cuddy and Keelor, was the most-performed song in Canada. By 1999 the band had sold more than two million albums in Canada.

On August 5, 2013, former keyboard player James Gray died as the result of a heart attack. He was 52 years old.

Canadian guitarist Colin Cripps joined Blue Rodeo as a full member in 2013 due to Greg Keelor's inability to play electric guitar live anymore because of hearing issues.

=== Solo work and collaborations ===
Cuddy, Keelor, Donovan, Boguski and Cripps have all released solo albums. Glenn Milchem performs his own solo music under the pseudonym "the swallows" and had co-founded, with his twin brother John, the rock duo Starvin Hungry. Keelor has also gone on to produce for other artists, notably alt-country group Cuff the Duke, who have also toured as support for Blue Rodeo.

Blue Rodeo members have collaborated extensively with other notable Canadian artists, including Sarah McLachlan, The Tragically Hip, Burton Cummings, Great Big Sea, Jann Arden, The Sadies, Skydiggers, Cuff the Duke, Crash Vegas, Cowboy Junkies, Sarah Harmer, Jill Barber, and Kathleen Edwards. They have won many Canadian music awards, including twelve Juno Awards and seven SOCAN awards.

=== Awards and recognition ===
On June 16, 2009, it was announced that the band would receive a star on Canada's Walk of Fame in Toronto. The induction ceremony was held on September 12, 2009. They are the fifth band to receive the honour.

Blue Rodeo was inducted into the Canadian Music Hall of Fame at the 41st Juno Awards on April 1, 2012, joining other Canadian music icons including Rush, Leonard Cohen, Neil Young, The Band, Oscar Peterson, Bruce Cockburn, Daniel Lanois, Joni Mitchell, Anne Murray and Tom Cochrane. According to CARAS, on selecting Blue Rodeo as the 2012 inductee, "Spanning nearly three decades, Blue Rodeo has sold in excess of four million records and won an unprecedented 11 JUNO Awards, establishing themselves as one of the premier groups in Canadian music history."

In May 2014, the band received a Governor General's Performing Arts Award (GGPAA) for Lifetime Artistic Achievement, Canada's highest honour in the performing arts. At the Gala honouring GGPAA recipients on May 10, the band delivered the evening's surprise finale.

The City of Toronto named Blue Rodeo Drive, a street in the Riverdale neighbourhood near the band's studio, after the band in 2022.

In 2024, Cuddy and Keelor were inducted into the Canadian Songwriters Hall of Fame. In the same year they were profiled in Dale Heslip's documentary film Blue Rodeo: Lost Together, which was the winner of the Audience Award at the 2024 Whistler Film Festival.

== Television and film ==
- The entire band is seen on-screen backing Meryl Streep in the 1990 film Postcards from the Edge. Streep sings "I'm Checkin' Out", written by Shel Silverstein.
- Blue Rodeo's song "Flying" appears on the soundtrack to the television show Due South as track 10, album released in 1996.
- Blue Rodeo's song "Lost Together" (from the album of the same name) is featured near the conclusion (and plays over the end credits) of Resident Alien season 3, episode 3 ("141 Seconds").
- The song "Hasn't Hit Me Yet" is played in a 2003 episode of the American television series Ed, as well as the 2015 British documentary, The Fear of 13, about exonerated death row inmate Nick Yarris.
- The songs "Try" and "Heart Like Mine" are played in the episode "Cupid's Quiver" of the TV show Friday the 13th The Series.
- The song "Bad Timing" is played towards the end of the season 4 finale of the hit Canadian show Corner Gas.
- Blue Rodeo is the band appearing at the end of the 1990 film Postcards from the Edge.
- The song "Try" is played in the background of the bar in the film Navy SEALs.
- Greg Keelor, one of the band's founding members, composed the soundtrack for the 2010 film Gunless. The soundtrack for the Canadian Western comedy also featured an original ballad by Blue Rodeo titled "Don't Let the Darkness in Your Head."

== Concerts ==
On August 11, 1988, the band played at the Erie County Fair in Hamburg, New York (a suburb of Buffalo). They were the headliners after a high school battle of the bands competition. The disastrous gig was the inspiration for their 1990 hit, "What Am I Doing Here."

As part of their 20th Anniversary celebrations in 2004, the "original five" lineup of Jim Cuddy, Greg Keelor, Bazil Donovan, Bob Wiseman and Cleave Anderson reunited for a live performance of five songs: "Heart Like Mine," "Try," "Diamond Mine," "Love and Understanding," and "Til I Am Myself Again." The set is included on the DVD In Stereovision: Blue Rodeo.

On Canada Day 2008, Blue Rodeo played on Parliament Hill. The band closed the show before the commencement of the fireworks and was joined on stage by several other artists to perform "Lost Together." On November 28, 2009 the band performed at half-time of the 97th Grey Cup. The band also performed live concerts for the 2010 Olympics in Vancouver.

Cuddy and Keelor performed at the annual Folk on the Rocks music festival in Yellowknife, NT from July 16 to 18, 2010.

On October 19, 2010, Blue Rodeo played the music viral show BalconyTV for a rare acoustic performance on a small Balcony overlooking Dame Street, Dublin.

On July 1, 2011, Blue Rodeo performed at Trafalgar Square as part of the Canada Day celebrations in London.

Blue Rodeo performed at their induction to the Canadian Music Hall of Fame during the Juno Awards of 2012 at Scotiabank Place in the community of Kanata in Ottawa, Ontario on Sunday, April 1, 2012. They took the stage with long-time friend and collaborator Sarah McLachlan and performed their 1992 hit single, "Lost Together." As the performance ended, the audience rose for a spirited standing ovation recognizing Blue Rodeo as "one of Canada's true musical treasures."

On January 1, 2017, Blue Rodeo took part in CBC's The Strombo Show's Hip 30, covering "Bobcaygeon".

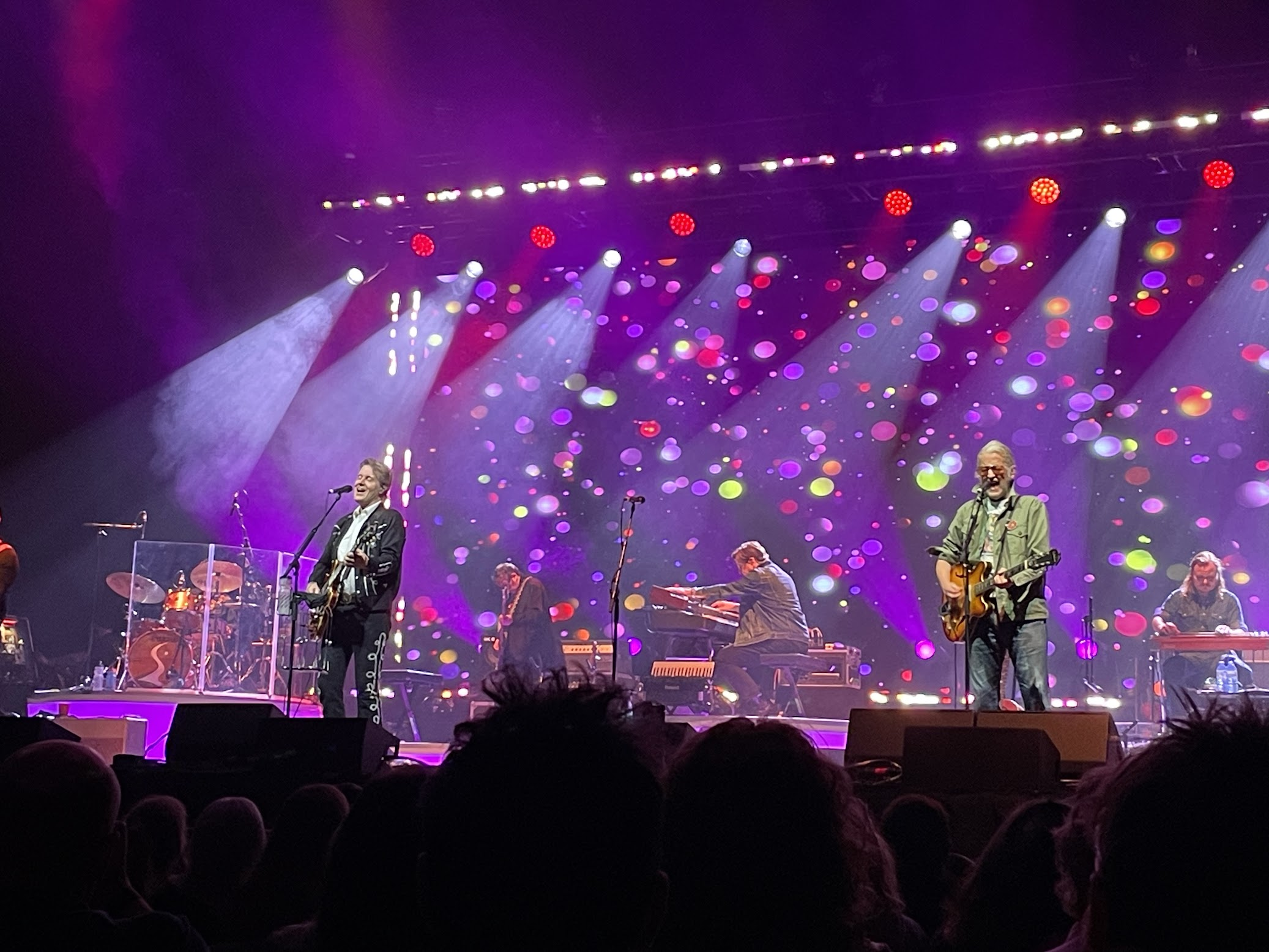
Blue Rodeo performs at Slush Puppie Place in Kingston, Ontario on November 20th, 2025

Blue Rodeo hosts an annual concert each summer at Budweiser Stage. 2020 was the first time in years the concert did not take place due to the COVID-19 pandemic. Instead, the band performed on Citytv's Budweiser Stage at Home.

In 2025, they embarked on a 40th anniversary tour, playing shows in 22 cities across eight provinces of Canada. The tour began on October 1, 2025 with two shows at the Southern Alberta Jubilee Auditorium in Calgary and concluded in January 2026 with two shows at Massey Hall in Toronto. They were joined by Adam Baldwin, who opened for them.

== Personnel ==
=== Current members ===
- Jim Cuddy – vocals, guitar (1984–present)
- Greg Keelor – vocals, guitar (1984–present)
- Bazil Donovan – bass (1984–present)
- Glenn Milchem – drums (1991–present)
- Michael Boguski – piano, organ (2008–present)
- Colin Cripps – guitar, backing vocals (2012–present)
- Jimmy Bowskill – pedal steel, mandolin, guitar, backing vocals (2017–present)

=== Former members ===
- Cleave Anderson – drums (1984–1989)
- Bob Wiseman – piano, organ, accordion (1984–1992)
- Mark French – drums (1989–1991)
- James Gray – piano, organ (1992–2005; died 2013)
- Kim Deschamps – pedal steel, mandolin, guitar (1993–2000)
- Bob Packwood – piano, organ (2005–2008)
- Bob Egan – pedal steel, mandolin, guitar (2000–2016)

== Discography ==
=== Studio albums ===
- Outskirts (1987)
- Diamond Mine (1989)
- Casino (1990)
- Lost Together (1992)
- Five Days in July (1993)
- Nowhere to Here (1995)
- Tremolo (1997)
- The Days in Between (2000)
- Palace of Gold (2002)
- Are You Ready (2005)
- Small Miracles (2007)
- The Things We Left Behind (2009)
- In Our Nature (2013)
- A Merrie Christmas to You (2014)
- 1000 Arms (2016)
- Many a Mile (2021)

== Videography ==
Video albums

- Blue Movies (1991)
- In Stereovision (2004) - Certified 3× Platinum by the CRIA.
- Toronto Rocks (SARSfest) (2004) - Canadian edition featuring Blue Rodeo.

Video singles

- "Bulletproof" (from Watch This!) (2004)

Soundtrack appearances

- "I'm Checkin' Out" with Meryl Streep (from Postcards from the Edge) (1990)

Documentaries

- "Blue Rodeo - Lost Together" (2024)

== See also ==
- Canadian rock
- Music of Canada
- Alternative country
- List of alternative country musicians
- List of bands from Canada

Preceded by Theory of a Deadman	Grey Cup Halftime Show; 2009	Succeeded by Bachman & Turner
