= Greg Keelor =

Greg Keelor OC
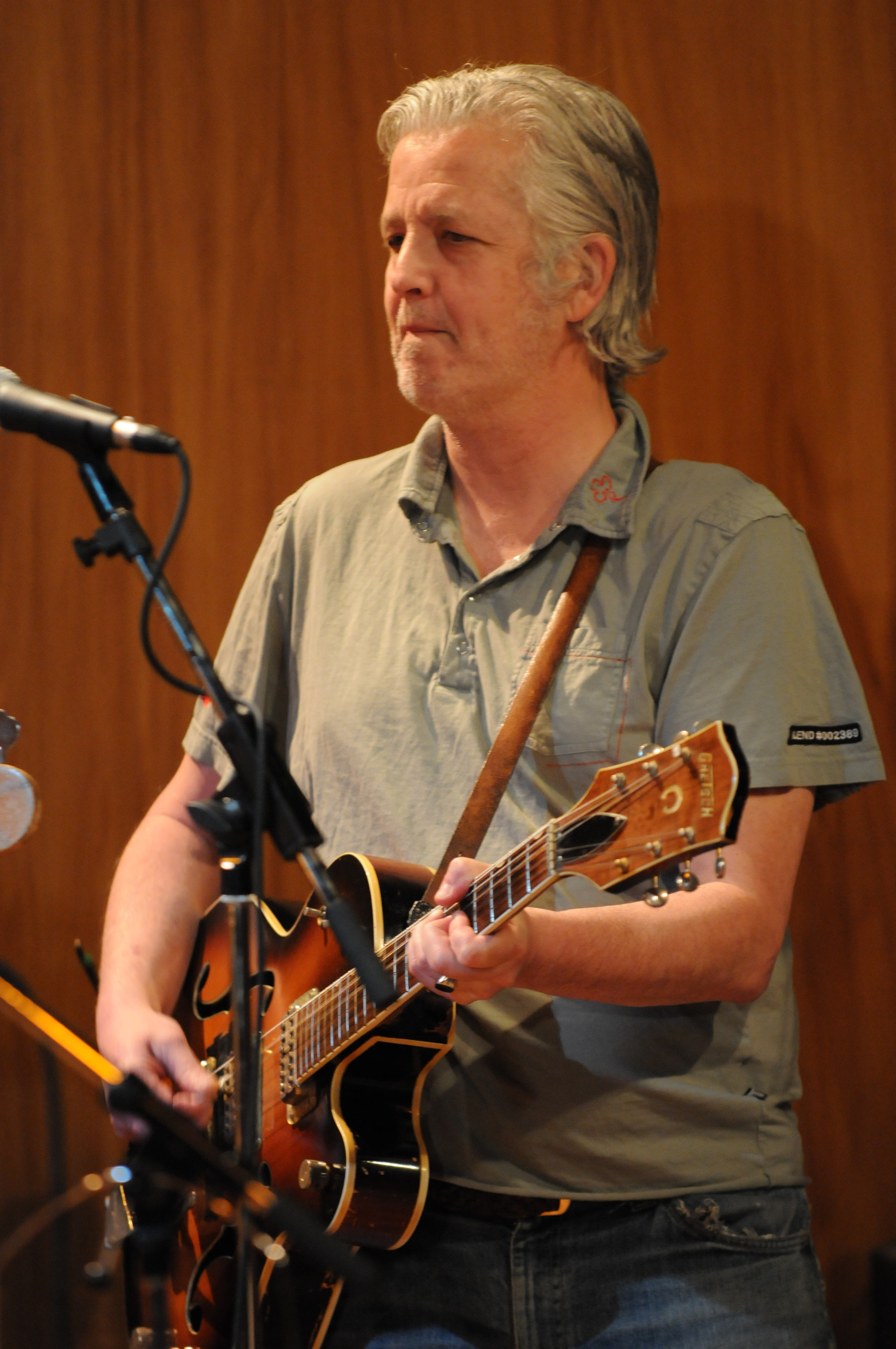

Background information
- Born: James Gregory Keelor; August 29, 1954 (age 71); Inverness County, Nova Scotia, Canada
- Genres: Pop/Rock; Rock; Country; Alternative country; Roots rock; Folk rock; Psychedelia; Americana
- Occupations: Musician, songwriter, record producer
- Years active: 1987–present
- Website: gregkeelor.com

James Gregory Keelor, OC (born Francis McIntyre; August 29, 1954) is a Canadian singer-songwriter and musician. He is best known as a member of the band Blue Rodeo, where he shares song writing and vocal duties with Jim Cuddy. Keelor has also released three solo albums and appeared as a guest musician on albums by Crash Vegas and Melissa McClelland. He participated, along with Rick White and members of The Sadies, in the supergroup The Unintended.

== Early life ==
Keelor was born Francis McIntyre in Inverness, Nova Scotia, on August 29, 1954. Though he didn't know until adulthood, his birth parents had put him up for adoption. Keelor was adopted at age three and raised in Montréal.

Keelor attended North Toronto Collegiate Institute, and it was there that he befriended football teammate Jim Cuddy in 1971. After graduation, Keelor, Cuddy and a group of college friends, in search of adventure, traveled to Western Canada in a rundown old school bus. The bus broke down in Saskatchewan, and Keelor some way or another ended up in Lake Louise where he worked for some time. It was in Lake Louise that he learned to play the guitar and first considered a career as a musician.

== Career ==
Keelor has been friends with Jim Cuddy since both attended North Toronto Collegiate Institute high school. When they both had finished university, they decided to form a band which they called the Hi-Fi's, along with Jim Sublett on drums and Malcolm Schell playing bass. The band released a single in 1980 featuring "I Don't Know Why (You Love Me)" and on the B side "Look What You've Done". The record was not a big commercial success, though, and when they couldn't get a record deal in Toronto, they headed off to New York City. A while after returning to Toronto from New York, Keelor and Cuddy formed Blue Rodeo.

Keelor is also a producer, having co-produced Blue Rodeo's Lost Together and solo-producing Cuff the Duke's albums Way Down Here and Morning Comes.

Keelor also composed an original soundtrack for the 2010 Canadian Western comedy Gunless.

In 2000, Keelor and Blue Rodeo bandmate Jim Cuddy were the recipients of the National Achievement Award at the annual SOCAN Awards held in Toronto.

In 2013, he was made an Officer of the Order of Canada along with Jim Cuddy, "for their contributions to Canadian music and for their support of various charitable causes".

In 2018, he contributed the song "Unprovable" to the compilation album The Al Purdy Songbook.

In 2024, Keelor and Cuddy were inducted into the Canadian Songwriters Hall of Fame.

== Discography ==
=== Albums ===
Year	Album	CAN
1996	Gone	95
2005	Seven Songs for Jim	
2006	Aphrodite Rose	
2010	Gunless- The Original Motion Picture Soundtrack	
2010	Down and Out in Upalong (with Travis Good and Gordon Pinsent)	
2018	Last Winter	
2021	Share The Love	

=== Singles ===
Year	Title	CAN AC	Album
1997	"White Marble Ganesh"	44	Gone

=== Music videos ===
Year	Video	Director
1997	"White Marble Ganesh"	
2018	"City Is A Symphony"	Christopher Mills
2021	"Wonder"	Michael Hurcomb

=== Producer ===
Year	Title	Artist
2009	Way Down Here	Cuff the Duke
2011	Morning Comes	Cuff the Duke
2014	Kitchen Knife	Devin Cuddy Band
