= Jim Cuddy =

Canadian singer-songwriter (born 1955)

Jim Cuddy OC
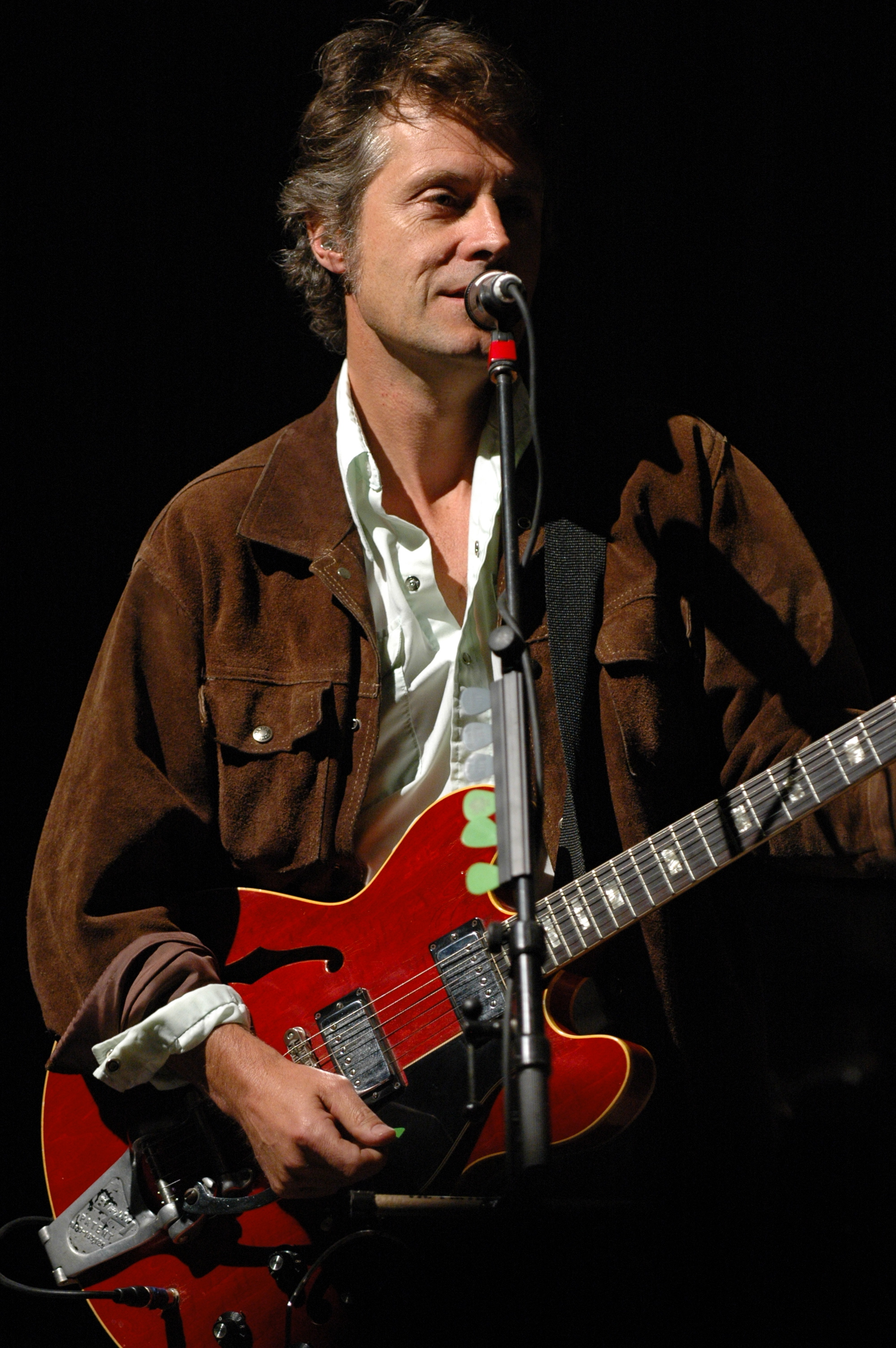
- Jim Cuddy with Blue Rodeo in 2005 at the Spencerville Fair

Background information
- Born: James Gordon Cuddy; December 2, 1955 (age 70); Toronto, Ontario, Canada
- Origin: Toronto, Ontario, Canada
- Genres: Pop/Rock; Rock; Country; Alternative country; Folk rock; Soft rock; Americana
- Occupations: Musician, songwriter
- Instruments: Guitar, piano, mandolin, vocals, harmonica
- Years active: 1978–present
- Label: Warner Music Canada
- Website: jimcuddy.com

James Gordon Cuddy, OC (born December 2, 1955) is a Canadian singer-songwriter primarily associated with the band Blue Rodeo.

== Early life and education ==
Cuddy was born in Toronto, Ontario. His mother Jean Cuddy was an English teacher at Monarch Park Secondary School. He attended North Toronto Collegiate Institute, where he met and befriended Greg Keelor, his future bandmate. He also went to Upper Canada College and Queen's University.

== Musical career ==
=== The Hi-Fis ===
After graduating from university, Cuddy and Keelor formed a band called the Hi-Fis along with Jim Sublett on drums and Malcolm Schell playing bass. The band released a single in 1980 featuring "Look What You've Done" and on the B side "I Don't Know Why (You Love Me)". The record was not a commercial success, and when they couldn't get a record deal in Toronto, they headed off to New York City. In New York they met keyboardist Bob Wiseman, but were still unable to arrange a recording contract. They later moved back to Toronto.

=== Blue Rodeo ===
In 1984, Cuddy and Keelor formed a new band, Blue Rodeo, with Wiseman, and recruited Bazil Donovan on bass and Cleave Anderson on drums as backup. Since that time, Cuddy has continued to lead the band, which has toured extensively and released 16 studio albums.

=== Jim Cuddy Band ===
Cuddy has recorded a number of solo albums and performs live with the Jim Cuddy Band, featuring musicians such as Bazil Donovan, Colin Cripps, Joel Anderson, Steve O'Connor, Anne Lindsay and Gavin Brown. Guest performers on his solo albums have included Kathleen Edwards, former Weeping Tile member Sarah Harmer, and Wilco's Jeff Tweedy.

=== Other endeavours ===
Jim Cuddy's song "Whistler" from the All in Time album was featured in the 2002 documentary Ski Bums by John Zaritsky.

In 2016, Cuddy participated in a benefit concert in Edmonton, Alberta and another in Toronto, Ontario for the citizens of Fort McMurray, whose town was destroyed by fire.

On March 19, 2020, he performed the first concert in the National Arts Centre's #CanadaPerforms series of livestreamed home concerts by Canadian musicians during the COVID-19 pandemic.

He narrates the TVOntario documentary series Striking Balance.

== Awards ==
Cuddy won Best Male Vocalist at The 1999 JUNO Awards and Adult Alternative Album of the Year for The Light That Guides You Home at The 2007 JUNO Awards

In 2000, Cuddy and Blue Rodeo bandmate Greg Keelor were the recipients of the National Achievement Award at the annual SOCAN Awards held in Toronto.

In 2013, he was made an Officer of the Order of Canada along with Greg Keelor, "for their contributions to Canadian music and for their support of various charitable causes".

In 2024, Cuddy and Keelor were inducted into the Canadian Songwriters Hall of Fame.

== Personal life ==
Cuddy married Canadian actress Rena Polley in 1984. They have three children: daughter Emma; and two sons, Devin and Sam, who are also musicians. His brother Loftus Cuddy was a Conservative candidate for the riding of Toronto—Danforth in the 2004 Canadian federal election, but he was not elected.

In the 2004 edition of Canada Reads, Cuddy advocated for Guy Vanderhaeghe's novel The Last Crossing, which won the competition. In the 2007 edition of Canada Reads, an "all-star" competition pitting the five winning advocates from previous years against each other, Cuddy returned to champion Timothy Taylor's novel Stanley Park.

In 2016, Cuddy collaborated with Tawse Winery in Niagara to launch a new wine brand, Cuddy by Tawse.

In 2017, Cuddy narrated the documentary TV series Striking Balance.

== Discography ==
=== Albums ===
Title	Album details	Peak positions	Certifications (sales thresholds)
Title	Album details	CAN	Certifications (sales thresholds)
All in Time	Release date: September 8, 1998; Label: WEA	38	CAN: Gold
The Light That Guides You Home	Release date: September 12, 2006; Label: WEA	18	CAN: Gold
Skyscraper Soul	Release date: September 27, 2011; Label: WEA	8	
Constellation	Release date: January 26, 2018; Label: WEA	3	
Countrywide Soul	Release date: May 31, 2019; Label: WEA	56	
All the World Fades Away	Release date: June 14, 2024; Label: WEA		

=== Singles ===
Year	Single	Peak positions	Album
Year	Single	CAN	Album
1998	"Disappointment"	53	All in Time
1998	"Too Many Hands"^{[A]}	—	All in Time
1999	"Trouble"	—	All in Time
1999	"All in Time"	73	All in Time
2006	"Pull Me Through"	—	The Light That Guides You Home
2007	"Married Again" (with Kathleen Edwards)	—	The Light That Guides You Home
2007	"Maybe Sometime"	—	The Light That Guides You Home
2011	"Everyone Watched the Wedding"	—	Skyscraper Soul
2012	"Regular Days"	—	Skyscraper Soul
2024	"All the World Fades Away"	—	All the World Fades Away
"—" denotes releases that did not chart

Notes

- A "Too Many Hands" peaked at number 13 on the Canadian RPM Adult contemporary Tracks chart and number 34 on the RPM Country Tracks chart.

=== Guest singles ===
Year	Single	Artist	Album
2004	"Somewhere Else"	Jim Bryson	The North Side Benches
2008	"Songbird"	Melanie Doane	A Thousand Nights
2011	"Hard Luck Girl"	The Cooper Brothers	In from the Cold
2013	"Pancho and Lefty"	George Canyon	Classics II

=== Music videos ===
Year	Video	Director
1998	"Disappointment"	Ulf Buddensieck
1998	"Too Many Hands"	
1999	"Trouble"	
2004	"Somewhere Else" (with Jim Bryson)	
2006	"Pull Me Through"	
2007	"Married Again" (with Kathleen Edwards)	
2008	"Songbird" (with Melanie Doane)	
2011	"Everyone Watched the Wedding"	
2018	"You Be The Leaver"	Tatjana Green/Matthew Barnett
2018	"Constellations"	Christopher Mills
2019	"Back Here Again"	Stephen Hughes
2019	"Glorious Day"	Peter Guzda
2024	"Learn to Live Alone"	Jenn Grant
2024	"Impossible"	Jenn Grant
