= List of The Expanse episodes =

The Expanse is an American science-fiction television series that premiered on December 14, 2015 on Syfy. The series was developed by Mark Fergus and Hawk Ostby based on the series of novels written by Daniel Abraham and Ty Franck under the pseudonym James S. A. Corey. Set in a future in which humanity has colonized the Solar System, the show follows United Nations executive Chrisjen Avasarala (Shohreh Aghdashloo), police detective Josephus Miller (Thomas Jane) and ship's officer James Holden (Steven Strait) and his crew as they unravel a conspiracy that threatens peace in the system and the survival of humanity.

On May 11, 2018, Syfy canceled the series after three seasons. However, on May 26, Amazon Video announced that it would produce a fourth season. In July 2019, Amazon renewed the series for a fifth season, which premiered on December 15, 2020. In November 2020, the series was renewed by Amazon for a sixth and final season, which premiered on December 10, 2021.

During the course of the series, 62 episodes of The Expanse were released over six seasons, between December 14, 2015, and January 14, 2022.

== Series overview ==
Season	Episodes	Originally released		
Season	Episodes	First released	Last released	Network
1	10	December 14, 2015	February 2, 2016	Syfy
2	13	February 1, 2017	April 19, 2017	Syfy
3	13	April 11, 2018	June 27, 2018	Syfy
4	10	December 12, 2019		Amazon Prime Video
5	10	December 15, 2020	February 2, 2021	Amazon Prime Video
6	6	December 10, 2021	January 14, 2022	Amazon Prime Video

== Episodes ==
=== Season 1 (2015–16) ===
Season 1 roughly follows the events of the first half of the book Leviathan Wakes.

No. overall	No. in season	Title	Directed by	Written by	Original release date	U.S. viewers (millions)
1	1	"Dulcinea"	Terry McDonough	Mark Fergus & Hawk Ostby	December 14, 2015 (Note: The first episode was released online on November 23, 2015.)	1.19
The series opens with Juliette Mao breaking out of a storage locker on an unidentified spaceship. Seemingly the only survivor, she breaks into the engineering room of the vessel to find its nuclear reactor fused with human remains. On the dwarf planet Ceres, Star Helix Detective Joe Miller is assigned to find Mao and return her to her rich parents on Luna. In New York, UN executive Chrisjen Avasarala interrogates a captured operative of the Outer Planets Alliance (OPA), a militant Belter group, about contraband stealth technology. On its way to Ceres, the ice hauler Canterbury receives a distress signal from the freighter Scopuli. The distress signal is erased from the Canterbury logs, presumed to be pirate bait, but acting Executive Officer Jim Holden secretly reports the signal to company headquarters, forcing the captain to send a rescue mission aboard the shuttle Knight. Holden, joined on the Knight by ship's engineer Naomi Nagata, mechanic Amos Burton, pilot Alex Kamal, and medic Shed Garvey, find the Scopuli empty and recover the distress signal transponder. As the shuttle heads back, a mysterious stealth ship destroys the ship Canterbury with nuclear torpedoes, leaving the Knight crew as the only survivors.
2	2	"The Big Empty"	Terry McDonough	Mark Fergus & Hawk Ostby	December 15, 2015	0.854
On Ceres, Miller investigates water theft from a wealthy area of the station, now severely rationed due to the Canterbury's failure to return. In Mao's apartment, he finds clues placing her aboard the Scopuli. On Earth, Avasarala sends the suspected OPA captive to Luna for further interrogation after her superior, Undersecretary Sadavir Errinwright, disapproves of "gravity torture", but the captive dies by suicide en route. Stranded in the Belt, the Knight is damaged by debris from the ice hauler's destruction. Using the last of their air, the survivors build an improvised antenna to place a distress call, which is responded to by the Martian Congressional Republic Navy (MCRN) flagship Donnager. After Nagata identifies the distress transponder from the Scopuli as Martian military technology, Holden broadcasts a message across the Solar System implicating Mars in the destruction of the Canterbury as insurance against being killed as witnesses.
3	3	"Remember the Cant"	Jeff Woolnough	Robin Veith	December 22, 2015 (Note: The third and fourth episodes were released online after the second episode aired on December 15, 2015.)	0.676
Holden's broadcast triggers protests on Ceres, with the OPA quickly blaming Mars for the destruction of the Canterbury. While responding to the riots, Miller's partner Havelock is brutally attacked and a man with the handle "Nightbandit31", with whom Mao was in contact, is killed. On Earth, Avasarala leaks information to the Martian ambassador about the suspected trade of stealth technology between Mars and the OPA. She deduces from the panicked Martian reaction that Mars was not responsible – but that somebody else wants to start a war. Aboard the Donnager, the Canterbury's survivors are detained and questioned, with Nagata in particular being suspected as an OPA sleeper agent. Complicating matters further, an unidentified ship flies towards the Donnager, ignoring all requests to divert or identify itself.
4	4	"CQB"	Jeff Woolnough	Naren Shankar	December 29, 2015	0.633
On Ceres, Miller identifies the dead "Nightbandit31" as Bizi Betiko, only to later discover the real Betiko is alive. Miller then learns that the deceased man was a data broker with multiple spoofed electronic IDs and recovers an implanted, encrypted memory storage device. Meanwhile, the Donnager's pursuers initiate an attack and reveal themselves as six stealth ships, which Holden identifies as the same ones that attacked the Canterbury. Unexpectedly at a technological disadvantage, the Donnager is soon severely damaged and Shed Garvey is decapitated by a railgun shot. As the Donnager is being boarded, Holden is evacuated on the Martian captain's orders to secure him as a witness to the attacks. He bargains for his crew’s release and they all narrowly escape aboard a frigate, right before the Donnager self-destructs. Far from the battle, at Tycho Station, a massive generation ship, the Nauvoo, is being built at the behest of the Church of Jesus Christ of Latter-day Saints. Station manager Fred Johnson, who has ties to the OPA, turns the Nauvoo's sensors towards the battle.
5	5	"Back to the Butcher"	Rob Lieberman	Dan Nowak	January 5, 2016	0.631
For lack of options, the Canterbury's survivors accept a proposal by Fred Johnson to dock at Tycho Station. With his help, they modify the ship's transponder, renaming the ship the Rocinante to hide its connection to the Donnager. A flashback shows how Johnson became "The Butcher of Anderson Station" eleven years ago; as a UN Marine colonel, he led an assault on a station occupied by protesting miners, killing all aboard (including many children) despite their attempts at surrender. On Ceres, Miller finds evidence linking Julie Mao to the OPA, which tries to recruit him through its local agent Anderson Dawes. While leaving Julie's apartment with the data chip, Miller is abducted by unknown people.
6	6	"Rock Bottom"	Rob Lieberman	Jason Ning	January 12, 2016	0.713
On Ceres, Miller is interrogated by Dawes, demanding to know what he has learned about Julie. Dawes' operatives attempt to kill Miller but he is saved by fellow Star Helix officer Octavia Muss. Miller and Muss investigate the data cube recovered from Mao's apartment. Miller brings the data cube to his boss at Star Helix and confides his suspicions about the Mao case. She promptly fires him and removes all his clearances. Avasarala wants a spy on Tycho Station to keep an eye on Fred Johnson and resorts to extortion to get her way. Holden and crew arrive at Tycho Station, and Fred Johnson reveals his plan to exploit Holden and crew's testimony for legitimacy with the UN Security Council. Holden makes an uneasy alliance, sharing everything he knows about the destruction of the Canterbury and the MCRN Donnager. Johnson seems fairly convinced neither Earth nor Mars was behind the attacks. After disguising the Rocinante as a simple gas hauler, Holden and crew set out for Eros to pick up the potential sole survivor of the Scopuli, codenamed "Lionel Polanski", at Johnson's request.
7	7	"Windmills"	Bill Johnson	Daniel Abraham & Ty Franck	January 19, 2016	0.502
During a visit to Holden's co-op parents' house in Montana, Avasarala learns of Holden's troubled childhood and gains some insight into his decision to affiliate with Fred Johnson. On their way to Lionel Polanski's coordinates, an asteroid near Eros, the crew of the Rocinante realize too late that Kenzo, a UN-affiliated spy from Tycho Station, is on board and has inadvertently atttracted the attention of a Martian patrol. Amos and Holden have a tense standoff when Amos prepares to kill the Martian patrol if they board. Holden denounces Amos' penchant for needless violence and prepares to shoot Amos should he try to fire on the Martians. Kenzo helps obtain the MCRN codebook from the ship's safe and the patrol backs off, believing the Rocinante to be a Martian black ops ship. Miller departs Ceres for Eros on his continued search for Julie Mao.
8	8	"Salvage"	Bill Johnson	Robin Veith	January 26, 2016	0.721
Rocinante arrives at the asteroid and the crew discover the Anubis, the stealth ship that had destroyed the Canterbury. It is empty and completely vented except for a mysterious organic substance that covers the ship's reactor and seems to respond to radiation. After taking the ship's safe, the crew blasts the Anubis with nuclear missiles, then head to Eros to find "Lionel Polanski", who escaped the Anubis on its shuttle. Errinwright informs Avasarala of his plan to have Holden and crew covertly assassinated on Eros. Avasarala receives word that her friend and colleague, Franklin DeGraaf, the former Ambassador to Mars that she used to gain information on Martian stealth tech, took his own life. Miller, who recognizes "Lionel Polanski" as Julie's code name, the Rocinante crew, and Kenzo converge on a hotel on Eros where Lionel/Julie are staying. Holden and his team are ambushed at the hotel by a UN black ops team (signaled by Kenzo and authorized by Errinwright) but are saved by Miller. Finally breaking into Julie's hotel room, they find her dead body in the bathroom covered in the same organic substance as the reactor on the Anubis.
9	9	"Critical Mass"	Terry McDonough	Robin Veith & Dan Nowak and Naren Shankar	February 2, 2016	0.555
A flashback from seven weeks prior shows the lead-up to Julie Mao's gruesome death; the Scopuli, with Julie as part of the crew, are on an intercept course with the Anubis, which they believe to be transporting a weapon from Phoebe Research Station to Eros on behalf of Julie's father, Jules-Pierre Mao. The Anubis ambushes the Scopuli, killing the crew and imprisoning Julie while revealing their intent to destroy the Canterbury and antagonize Earth and Mars into a war. After discovering the organic reactor substance - the protomolecule - has killed everyone aboard, Julie vents the Anubis, leaves it on an asteroid with an OPA beacon, and takes the ship's shuttle to Eros. An increasingly infected Julie tries in vain to contact Anderson Dawes for rescue on Eros before dying alone in her hotel room. In the present, Fred Johnson broadcasts evidence that the stealth ships were built on Earth. After Miller and the Rocinante crew flee the hotel, Julie's body is tracked down by Dresden, a scientist working for Mao. Dresden harvests her infected blood and informs Mao of his daughter's death, to which Mao responds, "proceed as planned". Under the guise of a ship explosion and radiation leak, Eros mercenaries working for Dresden and Mao place Eros into lockdown and seal the poverty-stricken citizens into radiation shelters after infecting them with Julie's blood. Most of the Rocinante crew head back to the ship, while Miller and Holden go to investigate the shelters. Discovering their true purpose as incubators for the infection, with everyone inside dead or dying, they also receive a lethal dose of radiation. Avasarala visits Frank DeGraaf's widowed husband, Craig, and steals data drives related to an Advanced Fusion Prototype which looks like the reactor on board the Anubis.
10	10	"Leviathan Wakes"	Terry McDonough	Mark Fergus & Hawk Ostby	February 2, 2016	0.555
Miller and Holden (who are suffering from radiation sickness) and the Rocinante crew make their separate ways through the increasingly dire situation on Eros towards the ship. They think that the conspirators behind the stealth ships are using the population as food for the "protomolecule" infection. Miller begins to see hallucinations of Julie Mao. Amos kills Miller's friend, Inspector Sematimba, after he holds Nagata at gunpoint when she refuses to launch the Rocinante without Holden. Miller and Holden make it to the ship, which escapes, and are treated for radiation sickness. UN spy Kenzo is left to be consumed by the rapidly advancing protomolecule infesting the colony. On Earth, Avasarala realizes that Errinwright (and potentially a whole faction of the UN) is lying about tracking the stolen drives from the stealth ships, making him a likely co-conspirator with Mao. She relocates her husband and grandchildren to Luna, anticipating the war to come.

=== Season 2 (2017) ===
Season 2 concludes the events of the book Leviathan Wakes and starts plotlines from Caliban's War, as well as adapting the short story "Drive".

No. overall	No. in season	Title	Directed by	Written by	Original release date	U.S. viewers (millions)
11	1	"Safe"	Breck Eisner	Mark Fergus & Hawk Ostby	February 1, 2017	0.700
The season opens with Martian Marine gunnery sergeant Bobbie Draper and her team undergoing combat training on Mars. They are deployed to Phoebe Research Station, which had been reported as being attacked. The United Nations debates blockading MCRN fleet deployments; Avasarala backs the measure but privately believes that she is being prepared by Errinwright as a scapegoat, and hires private security. An MCRN vessel fires on a UNN vessel; the UN elects not to fire back, figuring that the Martian missiles were saber-rattling. The missiles pass the UNN vessel and destroy Phoebe Station. Draper believes that war with Earth is good; her commanding officer, Sutton, believes war must be avoided. Holden and Miller recover from radiation sickness; Miller and Amos have a violent disagreement that is broken up by Naomi. The Rocinante crew finds a protomolecule sample in a cryogenic safe recovered from the Anubis and decide to hide it in a debris field. Naomi and Holden perform repairs to the Rocinante and their personal relationship deepens. Alex cooks lasagna for the crew of the Rocinante, and over dinner tensions are eased.
12	2	"Doors & Corners"	Breck Eisner	Daniel Abraham & Ty Franck	February 1, 2017	0.700
Avasarala hires freelance spy Cotyar Ghazi. The Rocinante arrives at Tycho Station and Johnson is unhappy with them, but the situation is defused by explaining what is happening on Eros and that the data from the Eros incident is being beamed to Thoth Station. Fred Johnson pulls together a strike team from rival Outer Planets Alliance factions, killing one of their leaders in the process. The Rocinante is assigned as the mission's muscle in the assault on Thoth Station, engaging the station's defenses and clearing a path for the boarding party. The station is not prepared to defend itself, and falls easily to the team. They capture the lead scientist on the project, Dresden, and an underling, Cortazar. Dresden is uninterested in who he answers to as long as he can continue his work. Dresden explains the source, dangers, and possibilities of the protomolecule and tries to convince Holden and Johnson to let him continue the project, but Miller shoots him in the head.
13	3	"Static"	Jeff Woolnough	Robin Veith	February 8, 2017	0.587
Earth destroys Mars's moon Deimos as retaliation for the MCRN's nuking of Phoebe. This creates tension in Bobbie Draper's squad. Holden and his crew return to Tycho Station, angry at Miller for killing Dresden, the lead scientist on the protomolecule project. Fred Johnson tells Miller that he needs to leave, but Miller remains and visits the Mormon temple. Johnson, Holden and Amos figure out how to get the captured scientist Cortazar to talk. Miller realizes that Eros must be destroyed, and that Fred Johnson has the equipment necessary to do so: the Nauvoo.
14	4	"Godspeed"	Jeff Woolnough	Dan Nowak	February 15, 2017	0.534
Avasarala gathers information linking the protomolecule to Jules-Pierre Mao, Julie's father, and hatches a plan to leak this information. Miller's Nauvoo plan is put into action. After assembling a demolition team to seal Eros's docks, the Nauvoo is evacuated of its people, commandeered, and set on a collision course to knock Eros into the Sun. After flying to Eros, the Rocinante drops its cargo of bombs and the demolition team retrieves them for precise placement. A complication arises when a group of humanitarian doctors is found who will not follow Holden's orders, so he destroys their ship to prevent spreading the protomolecule infection. The debris damages one of Miller's bombs, and he chooses to stay with it on Eros, watching the Nauvoo approach, but no collision takes place. Holden and crew confirm that the Nauvoo did not miss – despite having no human-built propulsion system capable of doing so, Eros maneuvered to avoid the impact.
15	5	"Home"	David Grossman	Mark Fergus & Hawk Ostby	February 22, 2017	0.600
Eros is speeding on collision course for Earth. Miller and the crew decide that Miller will bring the bomb into the heart of Eros to destroy it and then escape back to the Rocinante. On Earth, the United Nations decides to fire its planetary defense nuclear missiles at the incoming Eros, but the asteroid evades them by 'going stealth', ceasing to reflect radar. The Rocinante crew use their proximity to the asteroid to provide a target lock to Fred Johnson, who will guide the missiles to Eros. Eros reacts to this by accelerating still faster; to maintain visual contact, the Rocinante accelerates at the limits of human endurance and finally gives up the chase. Miller arrives with the bomb at the heart of Eros and discovers a transformed Julie Mao. While the protomolecule has infected her and Eros, she has in some way infected it back, and can influence Eros's trajectory. With a combination of words and affection, and after removing his protective spacesuit, Miller convinces her to redirect Eros away from Earth toward Venus, where it crashes in a planetary-scale event.
16	6	"Paradigm Shift"	David Grossman	Naren Shankar	March 1, 2017	0.625
Flashbacks show Martian colonist Solomon Epstein envisaging a future where Mars is freed from Earth's control by use of his fusion drive. In the present, Avasarala demands Errinwright bring Mao out of hiding by threatening Mao's family and business empire. On Tycho, Fred Johnson's idea to use the thirty missing nukes as a bargaining chip against Earth and Mars angers Holden. The Rocinante crew commiserate over Miller's death and agree to launch the protomolecule sample into the sun. Naomi fakes the launch; the others believe there is no sample left. On Ganymede, Bobbie Draper and her marines are sent to patrol the agricultural farms. They see UN marines running towards them, firing. Their comms are jammed. The UNN and MCRN fleets in orbit each think the jamming is part of an attack by the others. A full scale battle breaks out in orbit. This destroys several of the giant orbital mirrors. The crashing wreckage devastates the colony. The Scirocco comes under fire and Sutton is killed. After the battle, an injured Bobbie awakes to find her team massacred and an inhuman figure standing over her.
17	7	"The Seventh Man"	Kenneth Fink	Georgia Lee	March 8, 2017	0.451
After the Ganymede battle, Bobbie is rescued by the MCRN and asked to report the events, which some of her superiors do not believe. On Earth, Avasarala demands a peace summit between Earth and Mars to prevent further escalation of the tension, in which both planets believed the other fired first on Ganymede. Over three thousand people were killed in the Ganymede Incident, and the massive damage to the colony destroyed the agricultural domes that the Belt depends on – leading to a starvation and refugee crisis. On Tycho Station, a recently arrived Anderson Dawes is asked to represent the Belt in negotiations for peace with Earth and Mars, but Dawes convinces the Belters that Earth and Mars will never respect the Belt. Bobbie is ordered to Earth to the peace summit, and to tell Earth that Mars fired first accidentally, despite Bobbie remembering the presence of an alien figure the UN marines were fleeing from. On Tycho, Dawes becomes aware of Cortazar's presence and knowledge. Cortazar is later found to be missing from his cell, leading Alex and Naomi to chase after an escaping ship, only to find Diogo aboard and Dawes and Cortazar gone.
18	8	"Pyre"	Kenneth Fink	Robin Veith	March 15, 2017	0.460
Aboard a Ganymede refugee ship, the botanist Praxideke Meng (Prax) and others are headed for safety as he privately mourns the loss of his daughter Mei, presumed dead when the mirrors fell from orbit. The ship's crew throws refugees from the inner planets, including Prax's friend, out of the airlock, reflecting the rising tension between the Belters and the Inners. The ship later arrives at Tycho Station, which is inundated with thousands of refugees from Ganymede. On Tycho, the Rocinante crew discovers that a protomolecule 'shout' (signal) came from Ganymede at the time of the battle and that a pediatrician, Dr. Strickland, who used to work for Protogen, was also on Ganymede. They connect to Prax after they discover the footage showing Strickland leaving the pediatric clinic with Prax's daughter one hour before the battle. Meanwhile, Dawes's supporters on Tycho storm the bridge and take Fred Johnson and his subordinate Camina Drummer hostage, wanting to launch the missiles back to Earth in order to provoke a fight, but are unsuccessful when the Rocinante crew intervenes. Prax, with the Rocinante crew, set off for Ganymede with renewed hope his daughter is still alive.
19	9	"The Weeping Somnambulist"	Mikael Salomon	Hallie Lambert	March 22, 2017	0.471
Approaching Jupiter, the crew of the Rocinante realize that their ship is too obvious, so they commandeer the Weeping Somnambulist, unable to convince that crew they mean no harm. The Mars delegation arrives on Earth for peace negotiations, and Bobbie Draper gives testimony that makes it look like Mars started the battle of Ganymede by accident. Alex takes the Rocinante to hide behind Cyllene, awaiting a call from the crew for pickup or rescue, and Prax is unimpressed with the crew's planning abilities. Upon arrival, Holden and Amos realize something is wrong on the Somnambulist and, while attempting to intervene, one of the Somnambulist's crew is killed. A research vessel in orbit around Venus, the Arboghast, discovers that the Eros impact zone is teeming with unexplained activity, information that Avasarala matches with Bobbie Draper's additional testimony to realize that the solar system is still in danger.
20	10	"Cascade"	Mikael Salomon	Dan Nowak	March 29, 2017	0.573
Despite confinement by her commanding officer, Bobbie sneaks out of the Martian embassy to see the ocean. She passes through an enclave of street people under some overpasses along the way. Errinwright confesses to Avasarala his role in helping Jules-Pierre Mao with the Eros incident. Avasarala approaches Bobbie with images of the inhuman figure from Ganymede, now believing Mao created it as a weapon which could wind up in Mars' possession. On Ganymede, Amos beats an information dealer for footage of Dr. Strickland taking Mei to the oldest part of Ganymede station. Prax realizes too much damage has been done to Ganymede's ecosystem to ever repair it. Alone on the Rocinante, Alex receives the MCRN alert declaring Ganymede a no-fly zone.
21	11	"Here There Be Dragons"	Rob Lieberman	Georgia Lee	April 5, 2017	0.504
Bobbie forces Captain Martens to reveal Jules-Pierre Mao's protomolecule technology project. A demonstration of it caused the Ganymede Incident and triggered the battle in orbit. The technology is now for sale. Bobbie takes the information to Avasarala at the UN and requests political asylum. Mao offers to explain everything to Avasarala if she meets with him outside of UN control. She accepts over Cotyar's objections. The research team aboard the UNS Arboghast lands a probe on Venus. They see a massive protomolecule structure before the probe fails. Alex uses a Gravity slingshot to sneak the Rocinante past the MCRN blockade of Ganymede. Holden and crew explore the old part of the station. They find guards and scientists having a pizza party. After Prax starts a gun fight, the survivors barricade themselves in a back room. Holden and Prax realize the protomolecule monsters are actually Belter children with genetic peculiarities and deliberately infected with protomolecule. The fate of Mei is unclear. Most of the enemy is killed by a protomolecule monster, but a dying scientist says there are plenty more out there. The party splits. Naomi and Amos evacuate people off Ganymede, while Holden, Prax, and Alex hunt the protomolecule monster on the surface.
22	12	"The Monster and the Rocket"	Rob Lieberman	Mark Fergus & Hawk Ostby	April 12, 2017	0.515
Errinwright expresses remorse to Avasarala as she departs to Mao's ship with Bobbie and Cotyar. Mao claims he will give both Earth and Mars access to the protomolecule while he sits comfortably in the middle, preventing war. Errinwright meets with Martian Defense Minister Korshunov, poisoning him with a banned toxin for Martians that makes it look as if he died from a heart attack while also ordering the destruction of the Martian black-ops ship MCRN Karakum that was dispatched to collect the protomolecule monster on Ganymede. Errinwright subtly orders Mao to kill Avasarala and tie up loose ends. Holden becomes increasingly aggressive while hunting the protomolecule monster. Naomi and Amos repair the Somnambulist and though it can carry up to 300 people, there is only enough oxygen in the air tanks for 52 people, while over 100 refugees riot at the door. Naomi, with the help of a Belter who gives up his spot to her, manages to evacuate all the children and some young adults. When the Somnambulist is fired upon for violating the MCRN blockade, Alex convinces Holden to save them, threatening the MCRN ships with the Rocinante's arsenal. The protomolecule monster is shown to have stowed away aboard the Rocinante.
23	13	"Caliban's War"	Thor Freudenthal	Daniel Abraham & Ty Franck and Naren Shankar	April 19, 2017	0.581
The protomolecule monster is found in the cargo bay on the Rocinante. It attacks Holden, crushing his leg and pinning him to the wall. It tears out panels to get to the reactor core for its radiation. Amos says the only way to get rid of it is to use the air on the ship as a pressurized blast to force it into space, which would also kill Holden. Prax sees the monster craves radiation and suggests the nuclear core in a ship's missile could lure it out. Naomi and Prax expose a core; Prax throws it into space. The monster jumps after it and is incinerated by the main engine. Cotyar is wounded in a shootout with Mao's men. Bobbie manages to sneak away to get her power armor and saves him and Avasarala. As the science team on the Arboghast begins a descent to the surface of Venus to examine the protomolecule structure, the ship is stopped and disassembled in an increasing spherical pattern. Naomi confesses to Holden that she never destroyed their protomolecule sample; with Earth and Mars already fighting over it, the Belt needed it too, so she gave it to Fred Johnson. On Io, Mei and other children are shown to be kept in stasis by Dr. Strickland.

=== Season 3 (2018) ===
Season 3 concludes the plot lines from Caliban's War in episodes 1–6 and uses material from Abaddon's Gate for the remaining episodes.

No. overall	No. in season	Title	Directed by	Written by	Original release date	U.S. viewers (millions)
24	1	"Fight or Flight"	Breck Eisner	Mark Fergus & Hawk Ostby	April 11, 2018	0.653
The crew cleans up the Rocinante, missing a small piece of protomolecule in the process. They also conduct repairs and rename the ship Pinus contorta to hide during escalating tension between Earth and Mars. Errinwright convinces the UN to declare war, Mars blames Earth for the assassination of defence minister Korshunov, and everyone wonders what is happening on Venus. Things are strained between Naomi and the crew. Though Naomi wants them to dock at Tycho, Holden picks up a protomolecule signal on Io, convincing the others to find answers for Prax. Fred Johnson reaches out to Dawes to use the scientist and protomolecule to work together, and orders the Nauvoo retrieved as the Belt must unite as one nation. Errinwright frames Avasarala for Eros and says she is the one working with Mao, having missiles fired at Mao's ship to kill her. Bobbie, Avasarala and Cotyar force one of the employees of the ship, Theo, to help them gather evidence to expose Errinwright, then Bobbie and Avasarala escape on Mao's racing ship Razorback, while Theo and Cotyar escape on a landing shuttle.
25	2	"IFF"	Breck Eisner	Daniel Abraham & Ty Franck	April 18, 2018	0.500
As the civilians of Earth become more fearful about the prospect of war with Mars, Secretary General Esteban Sorrento-Gillis calls in an old friend, the Methodist pastor Anna "Annushka" Volovodov, to help convince the people that God is on Earth's side. Anna irritates Errinwright by calling for restraint. Jules-Pierre Mao visits Dr Strickland on Io, considering shutting down the whole project, though Strickland reveals the children of Ganymede can be controlled hosts for the protomolecule, including Mei. Pursuing the Razorback, Errinwright's men fire again and Avasarala's body cannot take the force of acceleration needed to escape. Bobbie sends out a Martian distress signal that is picked up by Holden's crew. Holden and Amos want to ignore it and Alex and Naomi want to help. Prax breaks the tie and decides to assist them. Holden has torpedoes fired around the Razorback as a shield and then uses an explosion for cover to get in close to disable the UN ship's engines. After Amos saves his life, Prax admits he is scared of what he will find on Io, though Amos says Prax should not give up on his daughter. As Avasarala passes out, she and Bobbie are picked up by a stunned Holden and crew.
26	3	"Assured Destruction"	Thor Freudenthal	Dan Nowak	April 25, 2018	0.553
Errinwright pushes a preemptive strike against Mars' long-range capabilities. Anna tells Esteban to take as few lives as possible so he refuses. Errinwright tells Esteban he must end this war to unite humanity against whatever comes from Venus, so Esteban has Earth launch an attack. A malfunction in the earth system allows one Martian missile to kill two million people in South America, which Errinwright reveals to Anna. Cotyar and Theo's signal reaches the UNN ship Agatha King. Cotyar kills Theo to maintain the story of Avasarala's death. UNN Fleet Admiral Nguyen believes Avasarala to be alive and a traitor, and prepares to charge Cotyar with treason. Admiral Souther of the Agatha King believes Cotyar's story about Errinwright, but Nguyen takes command and orders the ship to Io. Mao begins to bond with Mei. He demands the project be shut down when an infected child begins dying. Avasarala recovers and tells the crew of Mao and Bobbie's role on Ganymede. Holden still does not want to get involved with the war. Alex gets a message from his family that they do not need him anymore. Avasarala is disgusted Naomi gave the protomolecule to Fred Johnson. Naomi swears to never let Avasarala or Earth get any protomolecule sample.
27	4	"Reload"	Thor Freudenthal	Robin Veith	May 2, 2018	0.590
Drummer retrieves the Nauvoo. Esteban gives Anna's speech but it is revised by Errinwright to further justify destroying Mars before dealing with Venus. Anna is disgusted and prepares to leave. The Rocinante is very low on fuel and its crew prepares to scavenge supplies from a destroyed Martian gunship, but find three surviving Martian naval crew. Avasarala convinces Holden to send the recording of Errinwright's treason to Anna so she can get through to Esteban; shocking her just as she is about to depart. The three Martians are disgusted they are on a stolen Martian war ship, preparing to capture it by beating Alex and taking him and Naomi hostage. Bobbie is able to talk them down. Holden has the Martian's ship repaired so they can rejoin their fleet, giving them a copy of the Errinwright recording to pass onto their captain, whom Avasarala wants to pass it to the Agatha King. On Io, Dr Strickland secretly keeps working on Mei's infected friend. Mao is initially furious but when he sees that the boy is communicating with the protomolecule on Venus; and learning by ripping out and disassembling his nurse's organs, Mao realizes this is the key to everything.
28	5	"Triple Point"	Jeff Woolnough	Georgia Lee	May 9, 2018	0.555
The Martian crew passes the Errinwright recording along to Sandrine Kirino (CO) of the Martian cruiser Hammurabi. Avasarala admits Earth needs a protomolecule sample but wants to unite humanity and needs Holden's help to end the war. Naomi explains to Holden why she gave the protomolecule sample to The Belt; she has a son, Filip, in the Belt and believed that by giving the protomolecule to the Belters, it was a way of protecting her son. At the lab, Katoa tells Mao that the work on Venus is almost complete. Mao realizes that the protomolecule has an objective, orders the next subject, Mei, to be infected. Kirino gives the evidence video to Souther and explains that war is an unstable interaction between emotion, politics and luck (hence the title of the episode). Admiral Nguyen orders Mao to turn over control of the protomolecule monster missile-pods to him. Souther and members of his crew mutiny, announcing to Earth and Mars that they want to stand down and charges Nguyen with conspiracy to fight an illegal war. Nguyen kills Souther and many of those loyal to him, as others are taken to the brig. Nguyen destroys the Jimenez. The UNN ships begin firing on one another. The Hammurabi offers aid to any Earth ship willing to stand down. A wounded Nguyen launches the missile pods containing the protomolecule monsters.
29	6	"Immolation"	Jeff Woolnough	Alan DiFiore	May 16, 2018	0.609
Believing Holden's group to be Martian Marines, Mao and Strickland prepare to use the children as hostages. The boy hybrid attacks Bobbie. A missile hits and infects the Agatha King. Holden captures Mao and Amos kills Strickland, so that Prax does not have to. An infected Cotyar destroys the Agatha King to stop the protomolecule. Naomi tells Johnson about the hybrid missiles and he destroys them using the Belt's captured Earth missiles. On Earth, Anna exposes Errinwright who admits his treason and Esteban orders Errinwright's arrest. Mao is brought to Avasarala as a prisoner, Bobbie recovers with Alex, Prax spends time with Mei and Holden reunites with Naomi. A large protomolecule structure takes off from the surface of Venus.
30	7	"Delta-V"	Kenneth Fink	Naren Shankar	May 23, 2018	0.625
The protomolecule forms the Ring, a structure orbiting beyond Uranus. Earth, Mars, and the Belt send fleets to investigate it. The OPA is recognized as the government of the Belt, led by Anderson Dawes and Fred Johnson. Anna flies to the Ring with the UNN fleet. Bobbie, reinstated into the MMC, is with the Martian fleet. Mars sues the Rocinante crew over the ship. A journalist and her cameraman are allowed on board the Rocinante in exchange for paying the crew's legal fees. The Rocinante escorts the OPA fleet to the Ring. Naomi and Drummer command the OPA flagship Behemoth (formerly Nauvoo). Dawes' representative, former pirate Klaes Ashford, is named Drummer's first officer. Ashford undermines Drummer by preventing her from spacing a drug dealer. A UNN tech crew including Melba Koh is deployed to a support ship in the Earth fleet. Koh places a bomb on the ship and kills a coworker who discovers it. A Belter racing ship slingshots through the Ring and is instantly decelerated to a near complete stop, killing the pilot. Holden, alone in his quarters on the Roci, sees Miller sitting on his bed.
31	8	"It Reaches Out"	Kenneth Fink	Mark Fergus & Hawk Ostby	May 30, 2018	0.609
Melba hides the body and returns to the Thomas Prince. She briefly meets Anna. Holden keeps scanning himself for brain defects and protomolecule, finding neither. Miller only shows up when he is alone. Using timestamps from Monica's footage Holden determines Miller first appeared when the racer entered the Ring. Monica's cameraman swaps out a circuit on the Rocinante. Miller says he is an Investigator and he and Holden are tools for "it" to get to the Ring. Melba destroys the Seung Un and sends a fake message with Holden claiming responsibility. The Rocinante is unable to communicate a denial. On the Behemoth, Ashford demands they fire on Holden to prove the OPA is not with him. Drummer gives the order despite Naomi begging her not to. The ship malfunctions but eventually fires. Holden is able to get Amos to give him a minute alone, whereupon Miller says they should aim for the ring but they are moving too fast. Holden convinces Alex to slow down and enter the Ring. The deceleration hurts everyone on board. The ship starts to enter the Ring with the missile just behind it.
32	9	"Intransigence"	David Grossman	Hallie Lambert	June 6, 2018	0.568
The missile has been stopped and redirected by the Ring but the Rocinante is unable to communicate or access any weapons. The MCRN Xuesen follows them inside. Its probes determine a speed limit of 18,000 kph; and another of its probes blinks out of existence when it hits the wall. Cohen the cameraman admits to sabotaging the ship but says he only wanted information and never met the person who contacted him to do this. Alex notes that Holden's fake message came from within the Roci. Amos sends him and Monica out of the ship to be picked up by the Martians to explain Holden's innocence. Unable to repair the ship without Naomi, Holden believes their only option is to surrender to the Martians. On the Behemoth, Naomi realizes her heart is still with the Rocinante. Drummer rallies the Belters to enter the Ring but lets Naomi take a shuttle back to her old crew once inside. Flashbacks reveal Melba is the other daughter of Jules-Pierre Mao who could never get his approval as he preferred Julie. Melba intends to destroy Holden for her father. Earth's civilians are evacuated away from the Ring but Anna is able to stay. Miller has Holden investigate the center of the pocket dimension the Ring connects to. Holden detaches himself from the ship and goes towards a structure in the center.
33	10	"Dandelion Sky"	David Grossman	Georgia Lee	June 13, 2018	0.615
The Thomas Prince enters the Ring. Anna and others on board theorize the Ring is trying to isolate potential threats. Anna's friend Tilly recognizes Melba as Clarissa Mao and confronts her. Clarissa attacks Tilly to avoid being revealed. The Investigator admits he is just a construct in Holden's brain attempting to fulfill the protomolecule's mission of discovering what happened to an ancient civilization. As Holden goes towards the station at the center of the pocket dimension he touches a circuit, revealing Miller's last thoughts to get Holden to comply. Believing Holden to be insane, a Martian team including Bobbie follow him. They fire at Holden but the bullets are stopped in mid-air and a Martian lieutenant is disassembled and absorbed by the station when he throws a grenade. The station forces every ship to slow down further, interrupting Clarissa's attack on Tilly. Holden touches the circuit and is shown visions from the protomolecule's point of view. He is shown previous events in reverse before witnessing events in the distant past, planets exploding and a connection to farther away in space, and finally loses consciousness.
34	11	"Fallen World"	Jennifer Phang	Dan Nowak	June 20, 2018	0.670
The mass deceleration caused fatalities and severe wounds among all the ships; without gravity internal wounds cannot drain, meaning many more will die. Naomi returns to the Rocinante treating a wounded Amos and Alex. On the Behemoth, Drummer and Ashford are pinned on opposite sides of a large piece of equipment, working together to try to free themselves and learning about each other. Drummer allows it to roll forward, crushing her further to give the ship a captain in Ashford. Once free, to treat Drummer and the others, Ashford commands the ship's drum to create spin gravity, opening the ship to everyone's wounded. Leaving Tilly for dead, Clarissa realizes with all ships being drawn to the center, she can board the Rocinante. However, Tilly survives just long enough to tell Anna the truth. Clarissa boards the ship and attacks Naomi, seeking Holden, but Anna follows and tasers her from behind. On Bobbie's skiff, Holden wakes up and tells her he saw a vision detailing the end of everything.
35	12	"Congregation"	Jennifer Phang	Daniel Abraham & Ty Franck	June 27, 2018	0.730
Everyone boards the Behemoth with all weapons seized by the OPA. Holden is believed to be insane and Clarissa wears an injection system to impair her abilities. She is locked across from Holden without him knowing who she is. Anna tells her all she can hope for now is forgiveness. Holden tells Ashford the beings that created the Rings and protomolecule were somehow killed and used Rings to destroy planetary systems, attempting to save themselves. Drummer builds herself mechanical legs with help from Naomi, whom she later reunites with Holden. Clarissa can hear Holden's torment as he tries to get Miller to tell him what to do next. Amos takes a liking to Anna. A tech from Earth has the idea to send a damaged skiff with a nuclear missile to try and weaken the field blocking immobilizing ships and blocking the laser communication to the outside world. In response, the station begins charging energy. Ashford realizes the station intends to destroy the entire solar system and convinces the leaders of Earth and Mars to destroy the Ring with the laser, saving humanity at the cost of marooning everyone inside the Ring.
36	13	"Abaddon's Gate"	Simon Cellan Jones	Daniel Abraham & Ty Franck and Naren Shankar	June 27, 2018	0.606
Holden talks with Miller. The station thinks humans are a threat and Ashford's laser will cause it to destroy the solar system. To calm the station, they must power down the ships. Holden, Naomi and Drummer storm the Behemoth's reactor room. Amos, Alex, Anna and Monica broadcast to the other ships asking them to power down. Ashford frees Clarissa to work on the laser. Bobbie's squad is sent to stop Anna's broadcast. The Marines turn on Bobbie, who defends herself and Alex. Diogo attacks the reactor room in Martian power armor. Naomi crushes him with an elevator to save Drummer. Anna's message convinces the other ships to power down. Ashford orders Naomi and Holden killed, but Clarissa saves them and is shot shutting down the Behemoth. The station releases all the ships. It reactivates the remaining Rings to 1300 habitable planetary systems. Bobbie joins the Rocinante's crew. Holden says Miller wanted the other rings open and to find out what killed its creators. It has given humanity something to explore as part of its plan. The Rocinante passes through the Ring barrier while Holden watches some ghostly object seem to speed towards him.

=== Season 4 (2019) ===
Season 4 is almost entirely adapted from the fourth book, Cibola Burn, with the novella "Gods of Risk" providing source material for episode 2.

No. overall	No. in season	Title	Directed by	Written by	Original release date
37	1	"New Terra"	Breck Eisner	Mark Fergus & Hawk Ostby	December 12, 2019
Avasarala orders a blockade of settler ships near the Ring, wary of the risks of expansion. A convoy of Belter refugee ships from Ganymede attempts to run the blockade; of the few that succeed, the Barbapiccola lands on a planet named "Ilus" which features prominent alien structures. Avasarala sends Holden there as her envoy, with the rest of his crew joining him, in order to identify any potential protomolecule exposure. Naomi begins taking brutal drugs in order to develop a tolerance to high gravity. On Mars, Bobbie dismantles decommissioned warships for a living, discontented with her plight. With a truce between Earth, Mars, and the Belt in effect, Ashford operates as an OPA peacekeeper, tracking down and neutralizing renegades; Drummer commands the former Behemoth, now renamed Medina Station, which controls the Ring Space. The Earth ship Edward Israel, ferrying a Royal Charter Energy (RCE) expedition backed by Earth and Mars, sends a shuttle to Ilus that is destroyed during its landing; many lives and supplies are lost. The Rocinante crew arrives amid tensions between the surviving shuttle passengers and the Belter settlers that escalate into an armed standoff; it is interrupted when a swarm of alien "bugs" attacks the settlement.
38	2	"Jetsam"	Breck Eisner	Laura Marks	December 12, 2019
Avasarala visits Mars and invites Bobbie to a state banquet. At the banquet, Bobbie is rebuffed by fellow Martians and offended when she perceives that she is being used by Avasarala; she rejects a job offer from Avasarala. Bobbie discovers that her nephew, David, is preparing illicit "focus drugs" for a gang. She ends his involvement by beating up the gang members and destroying their lab. On Ilus, the Rocinante crew navigates the ongoing tensions between the Belters and Earthers; they identify the bugs as protomolecule-based. The drugs Naomi has been taking have not been fully successful. RCE Security Chief Adolphus Murtry, who took charge after the expedition's leader had died, identifies the shuttle's downing as deliberate; he confronts Belters about that and kills one of them in a standoff. Holden, guided by Miller, enters an alien structure near the settlement and removes a root growing through a panel, activating the structure; this triggers a pattern of lightning strikes across Ilus. Amos begins a relationship with Chandra Wei, Murtry's second-in-command. On Medina, Ashford and Drummer investigate the disappearance of the UN colony ship Sojourner and find it was stolen by Marco Inaros, an OPA pirate and Naomi's former lover.
39	3	"Subduction"	David Petrarca	Dan Nowak	December 12, 2019
On Earth, Nancy Gao, a former UN Home Secretary who has resigned from Avasarala's cabinet due to the disagreement over her blockade strategy, runs for UN Secretary General against Avasarala on a pro-expansion platform. Avasarala's aides uncover a nepotistic scheme that benefited Gao in her career; Avasarala has evidence of it discreetly leaked. On Mars, Bobbie learns that the gang has kidnapped David and forced him to work off the debt incurred from her destruction of their lab. Detective Esai Martin, the gang's ringleader, agrees to release David if Bobbie helps them steal military equipment from her workplace. After she eventually complies, Esai releases him. She declines Esai's offer to join his gang. On Ilus, lightning strikes the settlement, damaging the Belters' power generation infrastructure; Amos and Naomi help them repair it. Murtry identifies the Belters responsible for the downing and orders their execution. Holden, accompanied by Alex and RCE biologist Dr. Elvi Okoye, finds another alien structure that was activated; it is displacing wide swathes of ground while moving toward the settlement. Despite Okoye's protests, Holden has Alex destroy the structure with a torpedo from the Rocinante.
40	4	"Retrograde"	David Petrarca	Matthew Rasmussen	December 12, 2019
Drummer and Ashford apprehend Marco Inaros for stealing the Sojourner and executing its passengers. Drummer, Ashford and three other OPA faction leaders hold a trial for Inaros; he appeals to Belter solidarity, offers them the money he made from the Sojourner and promises to abide by the truce with the Inners. They acquit him by the three to two vote; Drummer, who votes last, chooses to acquit him to prevent division among the OPA, despite hating Inaros for hurting Naomi. On Mars, Bobbie quits her job after attempting to report material theft to her supervisor, only to find out that he is interested in selling more stolen goods. Shortly after, she is arrested for abetting the crime, presumably at the direction of her supervisor. Her charges are dropped once she accepts Esai's offer. On Ilus, Naomi tries to help Dr. Lucia Mazur, a Belter complicit in the downing, escape from Murtry and his forces; Amos gets arrested by Murtry while helping them. Murtry eventually backs down when Holden and Alex intervene and fire the Rocinante's PDCs at his forces. Naomi, Alex, and Lucia go into orbit aboard the ship while Holden remains on Ilus.
41	5	"Oppressor"	Jeff Woolnough	Daniel Abraham & Ty Franck	December 12, 2019
Avasarala and Gao's first public debate, during which Avasarala's attempt to use accusations of nepotism against Gao backfires, is cut short by a security threat; an unidentified ship, initially claiming to be a civilian ship experiencing a system failure, has diverted course toward an Earth asteroid defense platform and gone silent. After the ship is identified as the Sojourner, Avasarala orders its destruction. On Ilus, the Earthers and Belters face off in a tense showdown. Holden reveals his alien connection and reactivation of the alien technology to the settlers to convince both factions into leaving Ilus, but it only further inflames the situation. However, Murtry releases Amos as he also wants Belters to leave Ilus and perceives that his interests are now aligned with Holden's. Lucia and her husband, Jakob, have an argument over her part in the downing of the RCE shuttle and their family falling apart. Feeling guilty, Lucia attempts suicide; Alex saves her, and Naomi counsels her on dealing with guilt, drawing from her own past. An island on the other side of Ilus explodes, causing a shock wave to begin traversing the planet's surface.
42	6	"Displacement"	Jeff Woolnough	Hallie Lambert	December 12, 2019
Alex and Naomi inform Holden of the explosion and an impending earthquake; it will be followed by a shock wave, and then a tsunami that will destroy the settlement and flood the continent. Once privy to this knowledge, the settlers finally consent to evacuate Ilus; the Belters only do so after Holden agrees to vouch for their claim on the planet to the UN and Avasarala, which antagonizes Murtry. The explosion prompts Ilus' defenses to shut down the fusion reactors on orbiting ships; the evacuation shuttle from the Israel gets incinerated mid-descent. Unable to leave the planet, the settlers take shelter in the nearby alien structure; some are killed by the shock wave during the evacuation; the surrounding area gets flooded. On Mars, Bobbie succeeds in her new job for the gang. During a heist, she risks her life to complete the mission, impressing Esai. UNN officers visit Medina and criticize Drummer for mishandling the issue of the Sojourner and Marco Inaros. Drummer and Ashford receive evidence that Inaros is involved with someone on Mars and that he is currently on the Belter ship Pizzouza.
43	7	"A Shot In The Dark"	Sarah Harding	Dan Nowak	December 12, 2019
On Ilus, the Earthers and the Belters set up separate camps inside the alien structure. Everyone besides Holden, who is immune, has been infected with microorganisms that are growing in their eyes; Okoye determines that the microorganisms will cause blindness. Settlers also start being killed by neurotoxic "slugs" that are growing along and crawling out of the structure's walls from the Ilus oceans. Murtry plans to outlast the Belters and plots against Holden. Amidst the fusion shutdown, Lucia devises a solution to keep the Barbapiccola from falling out of orbit: tethering the ship to the Rocinante. On Earth, Avasarala is upset over her dwindling support in the poll numbers. After receiving the video evidence of Inaros' location from the OPA, she orders a team of UN marines to board the Pizzouza and capture Inaros alive with minimal casualties, but he is not found; a firefight breaks out before the ship explodes, killing everyone aboard.
44	8	"The One-Eyed Man"	Sarah Harding	Dan Nowak	December 12, 2019
Avasarala is condemned over the Pizzouza's destruction. In order to salvage her reelection campaign, she leaks images of the environmental disasters on Ilus, but gets confronted by her husband Arjun for putting her pride above the interest of others. Drummer resigns from her position, upset over Fred Johnson giving the evidence of Inaros' location to Earth. Ashford plans to independently hunt down and kill Inaros; Drummer, weary of politics, declines Ashford's offer to join him. On Mars, with the gang's upcoming job paying a lot and having many unknowns, Bobbie raises her concerns to Esai, but he discounts them as he needs money to make his family's life better. The crews of the Rocinante and the Barbapiccola successfully tether their ships to one another. In the alien structure, the settlers are all blind now, except for Holden; more Belters die when they wander off. Amos has a nervous breakdown over his powerlessness. Okoye determines that Holden is immune because of his anticancer medication (which he has been taking since absorbing radiation on Eros). She prepares a cure and the settlers regain sight. Holden finally sees Miller again, but Miller appears to be glitching in and out.
45	9	"Saeculum"	Breck Eisner	Daniel Abraham & Ty Franck	December 12, 2019
Murtry has the Israel launch a weaponized shuttle at the Rocinante. Alex destroys the shuttle, but the resultant debris damages many of the Rocinante's thrusters; Lucia is knocked into space but is saved by Naomi. Alex uses the ship's railgun as a makeshift thruster to maintain orbit. Miller, who can now intermittently overcome his protomolecule programming, leads Holden to an artifact that can shut down all of protomolecule activity on Ilus; this artifact, having the form of an energy circle, was presumably left by the species that killed the protomolecule's creators. Murtry and Wei follow Holden, but they are in turn followed by Amos and Okoye. Wei confronts Amos; when neither stands down, Amos kills Wei while Murtry shoots and disables Amos, blowing his fingers off. Okoye finds Holden near the artifact and tells him what happened. Holden goes back for Amos and confronts Murtry; after a standoff, Holden manages to disarm Murtry, though both are wounded. Miller communicates with Okoye and creates a metal mechanical body for himself to go through the energy circle. Despite the structure's attacks on them, Okoye helps Miller reach the artifact, through which they both fall.
46	10	"Cibola Burn"	Breck Eisner	Daniel Abraham & Ty Franck and Naren Shankar	December 12, 2019
Miller is gone, having successfully stopped all of protomolecule activity on Ilus; the ships in orbit get their power back. Murtry and Amos recover aboard the Rocinante. The settlers on Ilus decide to stay, planning to rebuild the settlement together and continue research. Murtry and Lucia are to stand trial for their respective crimes, but Holden sets Lucia free. While the Israel remains in orbit, the Rocinante and the Barbapiccola head back to the Solar System. Holden destroys the last piece of protomolecule still on the Rocinante, which Miller had informed him of. On Earth, Gao wins the election; Avasarala is being sent to Luna but Arjun, still angry with her, stays on Earth. On Mars, Bobbie's gang gets ambushed; Esai and most other members are killed. Bobbie notifies Avasarala of Martians trafficking military weapons with Belters and accepts her job offer. Ashford learns of the trafficking himself before finding Inaros and boarding his ship. After a firefight between their crews, Ashford corners Inaros, only to be ambushed by Filip, Inaros' second, and his and Naomi's son. Inaros kills Ashford, but unknown to him, Ashford has recorded their last conversation and hidden the recording for later discovery. Inaros launches asteroids cloaked with Martian stealth technology at Earth.

=== Season 5 (2020–21) ===
Season 5 adapts material from Nemesis Games.

No. overall	No. in season	Title	Directed by	Written by	Original release date
47	1	"Exodus"	Breck Eisner	Naren Shankar	December 15, 2020
A team of Belters, sent by Marco Inaros and led by his and Naomi's son Filip, attacks a science vessel near Venus, killing all aboard. Holden and Naomi are stationed at Tycho while Rocinante is undergoing long-overdue repairs. Holden is contacted by Monica Stuart about protomolecule research she has heard about and confronts Fred Johnson about that. Naomi gets word that Filip is on the asteroid Pallas and makes plans to go there alone. Amos is going to Baltimore, Earth, to settle affairs of an old friend and is met by Avasarala during his stop at Luna. On Mars, Bobbie is working for Avasarala to investigate the ongoing Martian weapons trafficking but feels that she is running out of time. Alex arrives to Mars to try and make amends with his family but gets a cold welcome; Bobbie meets him at the bar afterwards but their conversation does not go well. On Luna, Avasarala starts investigating the possible involvement of Inaros in the science vessel attack.
48	2	"Churn"	Breck Eisner	Daniel Abraham & Ty Franck	December 15, 2020
Drummer accidentally discovers the remains of Klaes Ashford's ship with great remorse. Amos returns to Earth for his recently deceased foster mother, Lydia, and finds her senior boyfriend Charles is about to be evicted. Amos confronts crime boss Erich to secure Charles' housing, and plans to meet someone before leaving his home planet forever. On Tycho Station, Holden receives a message from Monica, the reporter who claims to have proof of a plot stealing the protomolecule, but later finds she is missing. He eventually rescues Monica, nearly dead, from a shipping container on Tycho. On Mars, Bobbie reveals to Alex that she has been investigating Martian weapons trafficking with the help of Avasarala. Alex fails to approach Admiral Sauveterre, a possible trafficker, but finds himself a date with Sauveterre's charismatic personal assistant, Lt. Babbage. Avasarala's concerns about Inaros launching an attack on Earth still fall on deaf ears.
49	3	"Mother"	Thomas Jane	Dan Nowak	December 15, 2020
Drummer finds Ashford's abandoned ship, confirming his death. She extracts the recording in which Marco Inaros describes his plan to go after targets bigger than Tycho or Ceres, and sends it to Fred, who then forwards it to Avasarala. Drummer eventually decides against going after Inaros. Naomi travels to Pallas Station, where she reconnects with Belter friends Cyn and Karal. She eventually meets Filip, who is angry at her, and they take Naomi captive. On Mars, the meeting of Alex and Babbage is fruitless. Later, Alex is attacked by two assailants and is only saved by Bobbie. On Tycho, Monica shows Holden and Fred a video of a fight that occurred on Ceres in which Cortazar can be identified. Sakai, the chief engineer of Tycho, identifies the people who purchased the shipping container in which Monica was discovered, but they find them already killed. Bull, the chief of security, concludes they have a traitor on Tycho working for Marco Inaros. The first of Inaros' stealth asteroids collides with Earth.
50	4	"Gaugamela"	Nick Gomez	Dan Nowak	December 22, 2020
Alex and Bobbie take the Razorback, now named Screaming Firehawk, and follow a group of Martian ships they suspect of weapons trafficking. Amos is visiting Clarissa in a high-security underground prison when the second asteroid hits, triggering a lockdown. Avasarala contacts Nancy Gao, warning her of the stealth asteroids. Gao orders the Watchtower satellites set for spotting further asteroids right before the third asteroid hits near her plane, destroying it. Her order still goes out, and the next asteroid is spotted and neutralized. On Tycho, the ship coming for the container holding Monica attacks the station. The traitor is revealed to be Sakai, who assassinates Fred Johnson and helps steal the sample of the protomolecule kept on the station. Filip takes Naomi to Marco's ship, where she is locked up. Marco, now in possession of the protomolecule, broadcasts a speech claiming responsibility for the stealth asteroid attacks and declaring his Free Navy as the ruling power of the Sol system as well as all the ring gates.
51	5	"Down and Out"	Jeff Woolnough	Matthew Rasmussen	December 29, 2020
Drummer receives Inaros' offer to meet, which she and her crew accept. In the aftermath of the second asteroid impact, Amos and Clarissa are trapped in an underground cell at the prison. Along with three guards and another modded prisoner, they are able to break into a locked-off service ladder in the elevator and climb to the scorched surface. Naomi is held on Marco's ship, where she makes a concealed but futile attempt to assassinate Marco Inaros. She discerns that the Rocinante's drive has been sabotaged and manages to send a message to Holden, who avoids launching the Rocinante just in time. Pursuing the Martian ship Barkeith, Alex and Bobbie witness its rendezvous with Belters, but are later spotted and have to fend off a torpedo launch with a last-ditch core dump, leaving their fates uncertain drifting into the void.
52	6	"Tribes"	Jeff Woolnough	Hallie Lambert	January 5, 2021
Holden takes the Rocinante out after verifying their software is valid. Avasarala meets the new Secretary-General, who is out of depth in the crisis and asks for her support. Bobbie and Alex use some trickery to defeat a Belter boarding party and their ship. Drummer's clan meets with Marco. After some tense discussion, they reluctantly align with him. While talking with Filip, Drummer talks about Naomi and her role on board the Behemoth. Filip asks Naomi for details while Marco watches in the surveillance system. Amos and Clarissa avoid government relief sites to make their own way planning to get to Baltimore. Amos mentions to Clarissa his need to rejoin his crew.
53	7	"Oyedeng"	Marisol Adler	Dan Nowak	January 12, 2021
Naomi and Filip Inaros talk about their pasts and future. Naomi attempts to warn her son that Marco is an opportunist and gives her side of the story for leaving his father. Cyn also confesses to Naomi that he helped Marco hide their son from her. Holden joins forces with Bobbie and Alex to hunt down the ship Zmeya and to rescue Naomi. During the course of their investigation, Alex discovers that the Martians are selling ships to Marco's Free Navy. Holden, Bull, and Monica track down the Zmeya and disable it following a gun battle. However, the Belter crew destroy the Zmeya before Holden and his team can investigate the ship. Seeking to curry Filip's favor, Marco convinces his son to lend his personal ship Chetzemoka for a plot to trap the Rocinante while naming him as his successor. Marco reveals this plot to Naomi, who flees out the airlock towards the derelict Chetzemoka, having injected herself with hyper-oxygenated blood. Cyn attempts to stop her but perishes.
54	8	"Hard Vacuum"	Marisol Adler	Dan Nowak	January 19, 2021
Following Naomi's escape, a grieving Marco blames Filip for Cyn's death. Aboard the Rocinante, Holden and his team find no traces of the protomolecule during an analysis of the Zmeya's wreckage. Holden resolves to find and rescue Naomi. While collecting salvage from wrecked warships, Drummer, who is uneasy about following Marco, clashes with Karal, who supports Marco's cause. Back on Earth, Avasarala supports the new interim UN Secretary-General David Paster, who is learning the ropes of his job. At the first UN Security Council meeting, Avasarala opposes Admiral Delgado's proposal to launch a punitive strike against Belter civilians on Pallas station. Meanwhile, Amos and Clarissa travel to a devastated Baltimore where they convince the criminal Erich that they can access a sub-orbital shuttle at a holiday retreat in Lake Winnipesaukee. In space, Naomi discovers that Marco had rigged the Chetzemoka with a bomb and fake distress message in order to destroy the Rocinante. After several attempts, Naomi manages to distort the fake distress message, which is picked up by a suspicious Holden and Drummer.
55	9	"Winnipesaukee"	Breck Eisner	Daniel Abraham & Ty Franck and Naren Shankar	January 26, 2021
Amos, Clarissa, Erich and the rest of their group reach Lake Winnipesaukee, attempting to commandeer a suborbital shuttle. As they prepare the shuttle for departure, Clarissa persuades him to allow some of the winter staff of the now-abandoned mansions to join them, to escape the recent disaster. Avasarala learns that Pallas Station has been attacked by Earth forces, and leads a mass resignation from the Cabinet that results in the current Secretary General standing down; she later accepts the nomination to return to the position. Drummer learns that Naomi is still alive aboard the Chetzemoka but is powerless to aid her, as Inaros orders Drummer to lead a strike force to destroy her friends on the Rocinante. Filip is manipulated by Marco once again with his mother's survival. Alex and Bobbie realize they are closer to Chetzemoka than Holden is, and alter course in the Razorback. On Earth, a private security detail ambushes Amos's party in the evening darkness, but after a brutal firefight, they are able to successfully launch, bound for Luna.
56	10	"Nemesis Games"	Breck Eisner	Daniel Abraham & Ty Franck and Naren Shankar	February 2, 2021
As the Rocinante finds itself surrounded by Free Navy ships, Drummer betrays Karal to save it from destruction. Drummer loses members of her crew in protest, and Inaros executes her associate in retaliation. On the Chetzemoka, Naomi breaks a pressure valve, putting the ship into a spin to prevent docking. As Alex attempts a docking maneuver with the Razorback anyway, Naomi flees the Chetzemoka in her suit and attempts to warn them off. Bobbie rescues Naomi before her life support gives out, but Alex dies from a stroke during the high-G encounter. The Rocinante's crew reunites on Luna, where Amos tricks Holden into giving Clarissa safe refuge, Bobbie joins newly-elected Avasarala's team, and Chrisjen signals she intends to use the Rocinante's crew as a role model for winning the war against Inaros. Free Navy ships, aided by Medina Station and rogue Martian warships commanded by Admiral Sauveterre attack and destroy the joint Earth and Mars garrison at the Ring. As the ex-MCRN Barkeith transits a ring gate en route to Laconia, a world beyond the ring space, the entities that destroyed the Ring Builders begin to awaken and devour the ship. Meanwhile an alien superstructure orbiting Laconia suddenly blooms with the protomolecule.

=== Season 6 (2021–22) ===
Season 6 is the final season and focuses on plotlines from Babylon's Ashes and the "Strange Dogs" short story.

No. overall	No. in season	Title	Directed by	Written by	Original release date
57	1	"Strange Dogs"	Breck Eisner	Naren Shankar	December 10, 2021
On the alien world of Laconia, a young girl named Cara studies the local fauna and encounters alien creatures which she dubs "dogs". After an alien bird-analog falls injured, Cara takes it away to find help. On Earth, Avasarala and Bobbie are dealing with the ecological collapse caused by the Free Navy's continuing asteroid bombardment, which is tying up Earth's fleet in a defensive role. In the Belt, the Rocinante is on a recon mission. After destroying a Free Navy ship, the crew (Holden, Naomi, Amos, and Clarissa) discovers evidence that a ship called "Azure Dragon" is coordinating the asteroid strikes. On Ceres, Marco declares the planetoid the capital of the Belt, drawing wide praise and acclaim. Meanwhile, Filip struggles with accepting both his place as his father's son and his role in killing millions on Earth. In a heated altercation, he shoots and kills his friend Yoan. Elsewhere in the Belt, Drummer's crew-family (Drummer, Michio, and Josep) aboard the Tynan destroys a Free Navy bounty hunter ship pursuing them. In the process, they lose their second ship Dewalt due to Michio's mistake. Drummer and Josep decide to leave Michio at a safe harbor until the conflict is over.
58	2	"Azure Dragon"	Jeff Woolnough	Daniel Abraham & Ty Franck	December 17, 2021
On Laconia, Cara shows her parents the dying alien bird and learns that it was killed by the human food she gave it. She attempts to care for its young using a drone copter, but accidentally crashes it. A "strange dog" steals the bird's corpse. In the Belt, the Rocinante rendezvouses with a UNN tender; they take on supplies and Bobbie Draper, who has been sent by Avasarala to supervise the strike against the Azure Dragon. After a brief skirmish, the Rocinante captures the Dragon and its data core, with the locations of all the asteroids aimed at Earth. Elsewhere in the Belt, Drummer and her crew meet with Liang Walker, a pirate loosely affiliated with the Free Navy who will shepherd Michio to safety. While talking, Drummer and Walker realize they have aligned interests in injuring Marco and start planning their piracy together. On the UNN Zenobia, Avasarala requests that Monica Stuart use her journalistic talents to build sympathy for Earth among Belters. On Ceres, Marco releases Filip from prison. Feeling guilty, Filip arranges compensation for Yoan's family. Marco receives word of the Azure Dragon's capture and prepares for the Inners' fleets to come for Ceres.
59	3	"Force Projection"	Jeff Woolnough	Dan Nowak	December 24, 2021
On Laconia, Cara discovers that the drone and bird were "fixed" by a strange dog. Returning home, she finds that her young brother Xan has died in a traffic accident. The Joint Fleet of Earth and Mars enters Ceres without resistance, finding it abandoned and stripped of resources by the Free Navy. As UNN and MCRN marines coordinate relief efforts, a large explosion occurs in the docks. En route to Ceres, the Rocinante crew discusses their personal issues. Naomi helps Holden investigate the ship disappearances during the ring transits. On the Pella, Filip confronts Marco for abandoning Ceres as they start losing support among the Belters. As they detect the Rocinante, Marco decides to attack it with his three ships. During the battle, the Rocinante disables two ships; then Bobbie tricks the Pella and disables its drive. After Marco refuses to surrender, Bobbie fires a nuclear torpedo to finish the Pella, but Holden disarms it as he sees Filip on the screen; the Pella withdraws. Filip and Marco blame each other for the failure; Marco relieves Filip of duty. Elsewhere in the Belt, Drummer and Walker make plans to attack Marco's supply depots and are joined by more forces.
60	4	"Redoubt"	Anya Adams	Dan Nowak	December 31, 2021
At Xan's funeral, Admiral Duarte, the leader of the Laconia settlement, comforts Cara with a discussion about sacrifice. Paolo Cortazar tells Duarte he has found a way to activate the protomolecule structure in orbit. At night, Cara steals Xan's body and goes into the woods. On Ceres, Belters protest against the Inners' presence while the Joint Fleet deals with the consequences of the explosion. On the Rocinante, Holden is confronted by Amos and Naomi as they find out he disarmed the torpedo that failed to destroy the Pella. However, Clarissa advises him not to "feel bad about not killing someone." On the Pella, Marco punishes officers for their loss in battle; his executive officer Rosenfeld calms him down and tries to reconcile him with Filip. Filip is assigned to assist Tadeo, a repair technician. Drummer's team takes control of the Free Navy supply depot, but Josep loses his arm in the process. Drummer releases a system-wide broadcast calling Marco Inaros a coward. When the crew of the Pella sees Drummer's message, Filip loudly proclaims that Drummer is their enemy and they should fight anyone who stands against them as "there is no turning back now."
61	5	"Why We Fight"	Anya Adams	Daniel Abraham & Ty Franck	January 7, 2022
On Laconia, Cara calls for the strange dogs to fix Xan. After spending the night in the forest, she finds Xan alive but with pitch black eyes; Xan says that "everything looks different" for him now. At the Ring, an MCRN strike force attacks Medina Station but is destroyed by the heavy Laconian railguns that the Free Navy have emplaced on the Ring Station itself. On Ceres, the joint forces of Mars and Earth cannot agree on how to respond. On the Pella, the crew celebrates the victory. After Tadeo finds out that his brother was killed during the explosion on Ceres, he confesses to Filip that he was one of the people who planted the bombs. The Rocinante is stationed on Ceres for repairs. Upset with Holden's decision in the battle with the Pella, Amos is unsure if he wants to continue fighting alongside him; Bobbie convinces him to stay with his crew. Dr. Elvi Okoye shares insight with Holden and Naomi on the ring gate disappearances. Drummer arrives at Ceres with the resources from Marco's supply depot. In an emotional encounter, Naomi convinces Drummer to meet with Avasarala. Drummer and Avasarala form an alliance against Marco.
62	6	"Babylon's Ashes"	Breck Eisner	Daniel Abraham & Ty Franck and Naren Shankar	January 14, 2022
On Laconia, Cara's parents are horrified by the reanimated Xan and the father attacks him; Cara and Xan flee into the woods. The combined fleets of Earth, Mars, and Drummer-aligned Belters intercept the Free Navy forces headed for the Ring in a bloody but inconclusive battle. Disguised, the Pella inflicts significant casualties on the Belters' ships. Walker sacrifices himself by ramming his ship into the Pella, damaging it significantly. Meanwhile, Holden and crew send a team to the surface of the Ring Station to capture its railguns but are forced to destroy them instead. Naomi leads a plan to awaken the entities inside the Ring at the moment the Free Navy reaches it. The entities consume Marco and the Free Navy as they attempt to transit; Filip however survives as, having become disillusioned in Marco, he has secretly left the Pella on a skiff. After their victory over the Free Navy, the leaders of Earth, Mars, and the Belt form an independent Transport Union, selecting Holden as its president. He accepts on the condition that Drummer be his vice-president, then immediately resigns, leaving Drummer in charge. The series ends with the Rocinante and crew flying toward the unknown.

== Webisodes ==
=== The Expanse: One Ship (2021–22) ===
The Expanse: One Ship is a series of webisodes released alongside the sixth season. The episodes are available in the X-Ray bonus content section via Prime Video and feature "small little character moments" aimed to provide more depth to the mainline story.

No.	Title	Directed by	Written by	Original release date
1	"Ankawala"	Lewin Webb	Julianna Damewood	December 10, 2021
On the Tynan, Michio informs Josep that Camina has kept many video messages from Naomi on her terminal and no messages from other members of their family, proving that she cares more about Naomi than the rest of them. Josep tells Michio that every one of them is torn and comforts her in light of their imminent separation. In her cabin, Camina deletes Naomi's messages.
2	"Zenobia"	Lewin Webb	Julianna Damewood	December 17, 2021
On the UNN Zenobia, Avasarala is busy dealing with the war plans and situation on Earth. While waiting for the meeting with one of the admirals, she runs a medical self diagnostic scan in her quarters which shows multiple health issues. Upset and tired, she decides to take a 10-minute nap and switches the lights off, but gets immediately interrupted by a new message notification. Initially frustrated, she picks up the terminal and sees that the message is from her granddaughter who shares how she started her own indoor garden on Earth to help feed their family. Inspired, Avasarala sends an encouraging response in which she says that it is nice to see people on Earth trying to help each other even just a little. After asking her doctor to discreetly deliver her medication to her quarters, she continues with her duties as vigorous as always.
3	"Win or Lose"	Lewin Webb	Wes Chatham and Glenton Richards	December 24, 2021
On the Rocinante, Amos and Bobbie start bantering while cleaning up in the cargo bay. As their banter gets heated, they decide to blow off some steam in a wrestling match; whoever loses would have to clean up the rest of the mess by themselves. As they start wrestling, Bobbie overcomes Amos by catching him in a chokehold, but Amos distracts her by activating the alarm system and tosses her to the floor thus winning the match. After they spend some time regaining their breath, Amos leaves Bobbie to finish the cleanup.
4	"Night Watch"	Lewin Webb	Glenton Richards	December 31, 2021
On the Rocinante, Clarissa is doing routine maintenance checks during her night watch. While taking a meal, she receives the news of the death of her father, Jules-Pierre Mao, who was serving a life sentence in prison. Being distressed, Clarissa inadvertently activates her mods and passes out after causing havoc in the kitchen. After regaining consciousness, she confesses in her private journal that despite their troubled relations, she still cared about her father, wished that he would love her and that she would not love him. After ending the entry, she starts cleaning up in the kitchen, while experiencing pain from the mod activation.
5	"Remember the Cant"	Lewin Webb	Julianna Damewood and Glenton Richards	January 7, 2022
On Ceres, Holden sees the old graffiti with his face saying "Remember the Cant" referring to the events of the first season. (Note: Such graffiti first appeared in "Remember the Cant", during the protests provoked by Holden's broadcast message.) As Monica passes by, she wonders "what that guy would have to say about all this". Holden responds that he would probably suggest to keep one's head down and stay out of trouble. A flashback of ten years earlier shows the Canterbury's captain in the bar on Ceres as he was struggling in his communications with the Belters. At the same bar, Holden was having a friendly drink with the group of Belters without any difficulties. As the captain noticed this, he offered Holden a job on the Canterbury. At first, Holden declined the offer. However, when the captain promised that the position would entail "no or little responsibility", Holden accepted, unaware of what the future would hold for him.

== Ratings ==
=== Season 1 ===
Viewership and ratings per episode of List of The Expanse episodes
No.	Title	Air date	Rating (18–49)	Viewers (millions)	DVR (18–49)	DVR viewers (millions)	Total (18–49)	Total viewers (millions)
1	"Dulcinea"	December 14, 2015	0.3	1.19	—N/a	—N/a	—N/a	—N/a
2	"The Big Empty"	December 15, 2015	0.3	0.854	—N/a	—N/a	—N/a	—N/a
3	"Remember the Cant"	December 22, 2015	0.2	0.676	—N/a	—N/a	—N/a	—N/a
4	"CQB"	December 29, 2015	0.2	0.633	—N/a	—N/a	—N/a	—N/a
5	"Back to the Butcher"	January 5, 2016	0.2	0.631	—N/a	—N/a	—N/a	—N/a
6	"Rock Bottom"	January 12, 2016	0.2	0.713	0.3	0.759	0.5	1.472 (Note: Live +7 ratings were not available, so Live +3 ratings have been used instead.)
7	"Windmills"	January 19, 2016	0.2	0.502	—N/a	0.688	—N/a	1.190
8	"Salvage"	January 26, 2016	0.3	0.721	—N/a	—N/a	—N/a	—N/a
9	"Critical Mass"	February 2, 2016	0.2	0.555	0.3	0.878	0.5	1.433
10	"Leviathan Wakes"	February 2, 2016	0.2	0.555	0.3	0.878	0.5	1.433

=== Season 2 ===
Viewership and ratings per episode of List of The Expanse episodes
No.	Title	Air date	Rating (18–49)	Viewers (millions)	DVR (18–49)	DVR viewers (millions)	Total (18–49)	Total viewers (millions)
1	"Safe"	February 1, 2017	0.3	0.700	—N/a	0.907	—N/a	1.607
2	"Doors & Corners"	February 1, 2017	0.3	0.700	—N/a	0.907	—N/a	1.607
3	"Static"	February 8, 2017	0.2	0.587	0.2	0.610	0.4	1.197
4	"Godspeed"	February 15, 2017	0.1	0.534	0.3	0.694	0.4	1.229
5	"Home"	February 22, 2017	0.2	0.600	0.3	0.640	0.5	1.241
6	"Paradigm Shift"	March 1, 2017	0.2	0.625	—N/a	—N/a	—N/a	—N/a
7	"The Seventh Man"	March 8, 2017	0.1	0.451	0.3	0.583	0.4	1.035
8	"Pyre"	March 15, 2017	0.1	0.460	0.2	0.552	0.3	1.012
9	"The Weeping Somnambulist"	March 22, 2017	0.1	0.471	0.2	0.628	0.3	1.099
10	"Cascade"	March 29, 2017	0.2	0.573	0.2	0.677	0.4	1.250
11	"Here There Be Dragons"	April 5, 2017	0.2	0.504	0.2	0.541	0.4	1.045
12	"The Monster and the Rocket"	April 12, 2017	0.2	0.515	—N/a	0.565	—N/a	1.080
13	"Caliban's War"	April 19, 2017	0.2	0.581	—N/a	0.579	—N/a	1.161

=== Season 3 ===
Viewership and ratings per episode of List of The Expanse episodes
No.	Title	Air date	Rating (18–49)	Viewers (millions)	DVR (18–49)	DVR viewers (millions)	Total (18–49)	Total viewers (millions)
1	"Fight or Flight"	April 11, 2018	0.2	0.653	0.2	0.603	0.4	1.257
2	"IFF"	April 18, 2018	0.2	0.500	—N/a	—N/a	—N/a	—N/a
3	"Assured Destruction"	April 25, 2018	0.2	0.553	0.2	0.574	0.4	1.128
4	"Reload"	May 2, 2018	0.2	0.590	—N/a	—N/a	—N/a	—N/a
5	"Triple Point"	May 9, 2018	0.2	0.555	—N/a	0.555	—N/a	1.111
6	"Immolation"	May 16, 2018	0.2	0.609	—N/a	—N/a	—N/a	—N/a
7	"Delta-V"	May 23, 2018	0.2	0.625	0.2	0.553	0.4	1.179
8	"It Reaches Out"	May 30, 2018	0.2	0.609	—N/a	—N/a	—N/a	—N/a
9	"Intransigence"	June 6, 2018	0.2	0.568	0.2	0.629	0.4	1.197
10	"Dandelion Sky"	June 13, 2018	0.2	0.615	—N/a	—N/a	—N/a	—N/a
11	"Fallen World"	June 20, 2018	0.2	0.670	—N/a	—N/a	—N/a	—N/a
12	"Congregation"	June 27, 2018	0.2	0.730	—N/a	—N/a	—N/a	—N/a
13	"Abaddon's Gate"	June 27, 2018	0.1	0.606	—N/a	—N/a	—N/a	—N/a
