= Remember the Cant =

- The Expanse episode
- Episode no.: Season 1 Episode 3
- Directed by: Jeff Woolnough
- Written by: Robin Veith
- Cinematography by: Jeremy Benning
- Original air date: December 22, 2015
- Running time: 41 minutes

Guest appearances
- Kenneth Welsh as Franklin DeGraaf; Jay Hernandez as Dmitri Havelock; Jared Harris as Anderson Dawes; Lola Glaudini as Captain Shaddid; Athena Karkanis as Detective Octavia Muss; Greg Bryk as Lieutenant Lopez; Brian George as Arjun Rao

Episode chronology
| ← Previous "The Big Empty" | Next → "CQB" |

"Remember the Cant" is the third episode of the first season of the American science fiction television series The Expanse. It initially aired on Syfy in the United States on December 22, 2015, a week after the previous episode, and was watched by 676,000 viewers in its initial viewing. The episode was written by Robin Veith and directed by Jeff Woolnough.

The episode continues the events of the previous episode, following three main characters: James Holden, former executive officer of the Canterbury; Josephus Miller, a detective on Ceres; and Chrisjen Avasarala, a politician from Earth.

== Plot ==
The crew of the Knight, captained by James Holden (Steven Strait), is captured by the flagship of the Martian Navy, the Donnager. On the Donnager, Holden and his crew are interrogated. The Martian officer in charge of the interrogations accuses Naomi Nagata (Dominique Tipper) of being a terrorist member of the Outer Planets Alliance, and says that she may be responsible for the destruction of the Canterbury. A ship is discovered on a course to intercept the Donnager. It refuses to respond to calls, and Donnager's captain believes it was sent to retrieve Nagata.

On Ceres, Holden's broadcast has received widespread attention and has sparked protests. Josephus Miller (Thomas Jane) continues his search for Julie Mao, and contacts Anderson Dawes, an OPA member, for more information. Miller is put on riot control duty to quell the spreading dissent from the broadcast. The episode concludes with Miller's partner, Havelock, being stabbed by a group of Belters.

On Earth, Chrisjen Avasarala (Shohreh Aghdashloo) is working to find out who is responsible for the Canterbury's destruction. She initially believes that Mars is the perpetrator and recommends that the United Nations deploy its fleet to prepare for a potential Martian attack. Avasarala contacts Franklin Degraaf (Kenneth Welsh), the UN ambassador to Mars, and tells him that the stealth ships that destroyed the Canterbury were likely Martian. Degraaf informs his Martian contacts of this information, and the UN detects communication between known Martian stealth technology hubs. Avasarala concludes that this means Mars is innocent, and a third player is trying to force them into war. Degraaf is fired and banned from Mars for revealing the location of classified stealth technology hubs.

== Reception ==
=== Ratings ===
"Remember the Cant" was watched by 676,000 American viewers on its initial viewing, with a 0.15 rating in the 18-49 demographic.

=== Critical response ===
The episode received positive reviews from critics. Chris Carabott of IGN rated the episode 8.3 out of 10, stating that the episode "expands on what is already an intriguing mystery." Leah Schnelbach of Tor.com said the episode may be the best so far in the season, and that it "pulls off a great balancing act between its three very different threads." Michael Ahr of Den of Geek gave the episode 4 out of 5 stars, commenting that the show "requires the audience to put the puzzle together themselves, and god help anyone who loses a piece along the way."
