= Nauvoo =

Nauvoo may refer to:

== Places ==
- Nauvoo, Alabama, a town in Walker and Winston counties
- Nauvoo, Illinois, a city in Hancock County
  - Nauvoo Historic District
- Nauvoo, Tioga County, Pennsylvania, an unincorporated community
- Nauvoo, York County, Pennsylvania, an unincorporated community
- Nauvoo, Tennessee, an unincorporated community in Dyer County

== Fiction ==
- Nauvoo, a spaceship in The Expanse books and TV series, appearing in the 2015 episode "CQB"

== See also ==
- Nauvoo House, built by Joseph Smith in Nauvoo, Illinois
- Nauvoo Temple, a former Latter-day Saint temple in Nauvoo, Illinois
