= The Big Empty =

The Big Empty may refer to:

- The Big Empty (2003 film), a 2003 drama film directed and written by Steve Anderson
- The Big Empty (2005 film), a 2005 short film starring Selma Blair
- The Big Empty (The Expanse), a 2015 episode of the American science fiction television series The Expanse
- The Big Empty (book series), a series of four books written by J.B. Stephens
- "The Big Empty" (song), a song by For the Fallen Dreams
- "Big Empty", a 1994 song by the American hard rock band Stone Temple Pilots
