= Dulcinea (The Expanse) =

- The Expanse episode
- Episode no.: Season 1 Episode 1
- Directed by: Terry McDonough
- Written by: Mark Fergus and Hawk Ostby
- Cinematography by: Jeremy Benning
- Original air dates: November 23, 2015 (online); December 14, 2015 (Syfy)
- Running time: 45 minutes

Guest appearances
- Jay Hernandez as Dmitri Havelock; Athena Karkanis as Octavia Muss; Brian George as Arjun Rao; Joe Pingue as Captain McDowell; Kristen Hager as Ade Nygaard; Julian Richings as Vargas; Jonathan Banks as Executive Officer; Lola Glaudini as Captain Shaddid

Episode chronology
← Previous —	Next → "The Big Empty"

"Dulcinea" is the series premiere of the American science fiction television series The Expanse. It originally aired on Syfy in the United States on December 14, 2015. The episode was written by Mark Fergus and Hawk Ostby and directed by Terry McDonough, and is based on the first chapters of James S. A. Corey's novel Leviathan Wakes, the first novel in The Expanse novel series.

As the series premiere, it introduces a future where humanity has colonized the Solar System. The episode centers around three characters across different parts of a fully colonized solar system. Detective Joe Miller (Thomas Jane) is assigned to search for a missing young woman in the asteroid belt; executive officer Jim Holden (Steven Strait) of the spaceship Canterbury faces a moral dilemma when he responds to a distress signal in the outer realm near Saturn; UN politician Chrisjen Avasarala (Shohreh Aghdashloo) interrogates a potential terrorist who may have crucial information.

Before its official release on December 14, the episode was posted early online on November 23, 2015, and it received praise from critics for its world building, aesthetics, and storytelling. 1.19 million American households watched the episode on its initial airing.

== Plot ==
=== Background ===
The background of the series premiere is set two hundred years in the future. Humans have fully colonized the solar system, split up in three factions: Earth is controlled by the United Nations, Mars is an independent military power, and both depend on the resources of the colonized Asteroid belt, occupied by Belters, who work and live on the colonies set on the asteroids. For decades, tension has been rising between Earth, Mars, and the Belt, which increases the imminent possibility of a system-wide civil war, which will be one of the major plot points in the series.

=== Story ===
==== Prologue ====
Trapped in a small room on a space ship, a frightened young woman wearing a space suit hears ominous sounds and cries out for help, but no one answers. She then successfully breaks out of the room on her own, and searches for anyone on the ship. She makes her way to the engineering bay, which is drenched and glowing with unknown blue material, and notices what looks like a human being sucked inside the vortex. She screams.

==== Ceres Station ====
Ceres, an asteroid in the Belt, has been transformed into the most vital port in the Belt, whose occupants work and live there under harsh circumstances, such as physical deterioration from the gravity and their residence in space, rationing of air and water, and constant mistreatment by Earthers and Martians. Belters have grown contemptuous and have organized activist groups, such as the Outer Planets Alliance (OPA), in order to raise awareness and recognition for the Belters. Joe Miller is a Belter who works as a corrupt detective for Earth-based Star Helix Security, the Earther police force on Ceres, and is often scolded by his own people, who call him a "welwala" ("traitor to our people" in Belter Creole).

Having been assigned a new partner, Dimitri Havelock from Earth, Miller is given a new assignment: to find a missing girl, Julie Mao, a champion pilot and activist who is the daughter of wealthy businessman Jules-Pierre Mao. Miller is ordered to find Julie and bring her back to her family living on Luna. Miller takes a brief detour from his investigation; he tries unsuccessfully to flirt with his ex-lover and former partner, Octavia Muss, who shows signs of discomfort and concern for Miller's well-being. Miller later has a change of heart and decides to end his collaboration with Vargas, the sleazy owner of a sweatshop, whose child workers often develop sickness due to poor air filtration. Miller roughs up Vargas a bit, throwing him into an airlock and removing some of the air, in order to get his point across. He then continues his investigation of Julie afterwards.

==== Earth ====
On Earth, politician Chrisjen Avasarala, the U.N. Deputy Undersecretary, is spending time with her husband Arjun and grandson in her Westchester home, when she is contacted by officials and is taken to a U.N. black site, where U.N. officials are interrogating and torturing Heikki Sabong, a Belter member of the OPA accused of carrying contraband stealth technology. However, Sabong refuses to speak and Chrisjen orders to have his interrogation and torture prolonged.

==== Canterbury ====
Meanwhile, the Canterbury, a space freighter en route to Ceres Station escorting a shipment of ice, receives a distress signal which most of its crew disregard, considering that any time wasted on anything other than their jobs would result in a late arrival and the loss of their on-time work bonuses. Jim Holden, the executive officer of the Canterbury, is uncomfortable with the majority decision and secretly logs the message with HQ, which means the ship is now obliged to investigate the signal. The Canterbury approaches a damaged ship, known as the Scopuli. Holden is ordered to investigate and takes the Canterbury's shuttle, the Knight, along with some members of the crew: chief engineer Naomi Nagata, mechanic Amos Burton, pilot Alex Kamal, and med-tech officer Shed Garvey. Before the others arrive, Jim admits to Naomi that he was the one who secretly logged the distress call with HQ; she advises him to keep that to himself.

They head to the abandoned Scopuli and search for the source of the distress signal. The crew find a distress transmitter, but no signs of life. Captain McDowell informs the crew that an unidentified ship has entered their vicinity, forcing the crew to evacuate the Scopuli via the Knight. The unidentified ship then fires torpedoes that sail past the Knight and head straight for the Canterbury. Holden's lover, Ade Nygaard, gives one last transmission: "There's something you should know …" before the Canterbury is destroyed - killing everyone on board. Distraught and shaken, Holden and his crew flee.

== Production ==
=== Development ===
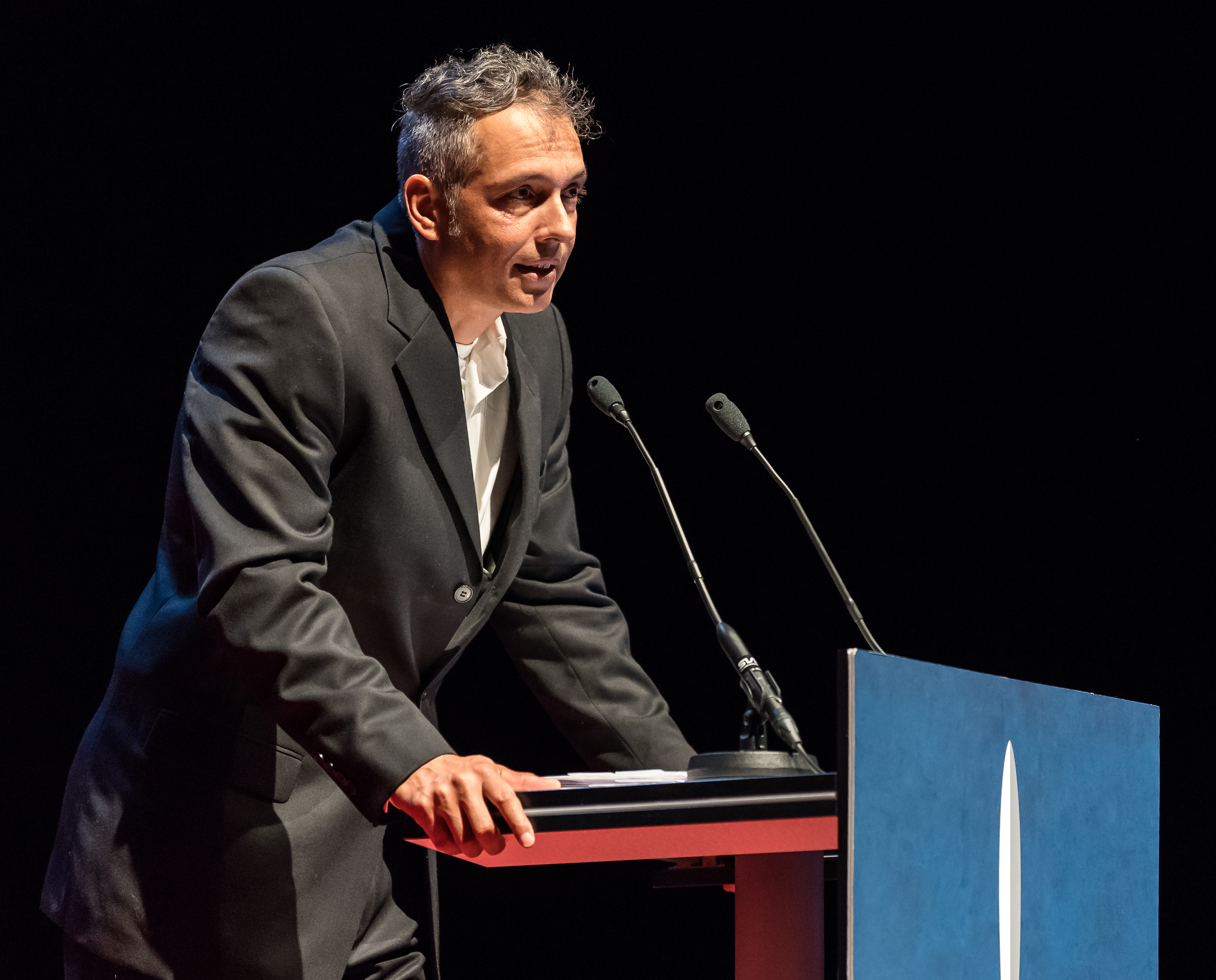
Hawk Ostby, along with his writing partner Mark Fergus, wrote the first episode.

On April 14, 2014, Syfy placed a 10-episode straight-to-series order for The Expanse novel series, with the first season based on the first novel of the series, Leviathan Wakes, which was nominated for the Hugo Award for Best Novel and Locus Award for Best Science Fiction Novel, after having won the project in a bidding war. It was described in the industry as "Game of Thrones in space". By October 29, 2014, Mark Fergus and Hawk Ostby were writing the episode, titled "Dulcinea", and serving as showrunners alongside Naren Shankar.

=== Writing ===
The script for the pilot episode was developed by Academy Award-nominated screenwriting duo Mark Fergus and Hawk Ostby, directed by British TV director Terry McDonough, and it was produced by Alcon Television Group. According to a statement via Entertainment Weekly, Syfy president Dave Howe said the following:

"The Expanse is epic in scale and scope and promises to be Syfy’s most ambitious series to date. Bringing this coveted book franchise to television with our partners at Alcon and the Sean Daniel Company is a giant win for Syfy, reinforcing our overall strategy to produce bold, provocative and compelling sci-fi fantasy stories."

=== Filming ===
Principal photography for the pilot episode started on October 29, 2014, in Toronto, and the pilot episode screened at San Diego Comic-Con in July 2015.

== Reception ==
=== Ratings ===
"Dulcinea" was watched by 1.19 million American viewers on its initial viewing. The episode also acquired a 0.33 rating in the 18–49 demographic. It remains the most watched episode of the series by the release of the tenth and final episode of season five.

=== Critical reception ===
"Dulcinea" has been commended by many television critics, with praise for the visuals, narrative, realism, and world-building. Lauren Davis, who saw the early pilot screening at San Diego Comic-Con in July 2015, months prior to its release on Syfy, wrote on io9 that she was "blown away" by the first episode, and adored its "incredible sense of scale" and its "deeply thought out future world that reflects on our present one, with high production values and characters who speak and act like real people." Zack Handlen of The A.V. Club gave the pilot episode an A− rating, referring to the episode's focus on world-building and complex politics as "refreshing... [and it] clearly knows what it’s trying to do, even if the results of its efforts aren’t entirely evident", and gave praise to other aspects of the episode, including its visuals and realism.

Chris Carabott of IGN gave the pilot an 8.5 out of 10, calling it "a promising start to a rich and exciting science fiction series" and praised its rich and expansive world, visuals, character development, and attention to realism, even though he warns that the breadth of content might be intimidating to some viewers. Michael Ahr of Den of Geek rated the pilot episode a 4.5 out of 5, stating that thanks to the premiere, The Expanse is "a force to be reckoned with", and despite his minor suggestions regarding the complexity of the world being confusing to some viewers, said, "...the journey forward should offer ample opportunity to hungrily gather up the tantalizing nuances of the show along the way." He went on to praise its characterization and Shoreh Aghdashloo's portrayal of Avasarala.
