= Perfect Storm: Disasters That Changed The World =

- Genre: Historical Documentary
- Directed by: Mick Grogan; Gary Lang; Brian Rice; Rebecca Snow
- Narrated by: Kenneth Welsh
- Country of origin: Canada
- Original language: English
- No. of series: 1
- No. of episodes: 6 (list of episodes)

Production
- Executive producer: Michael Kot
- Producer: James Gamester
- Running time: 60 minutes

Original release
- Network: History, Yesterday
- Release: 8 April – 21 May 2013

Perfect Storm: Disasters That Changed The World is a Canadian Historical Documentary which was broadcast on History and Yesterday. The series travelled around the world and through the ages to investigate the biggest and the most catastrophic storms of all time.

== Episode list ==
No.	Title	Perfect Storm studied	Original release date
1	"America's Deadliest Disaster"	TBA	8 April 2013
A look at the hurricane that hit the island city of Galveston, Texas, in 1900.
2	"Dark Age Volcano"	TBA	15 April 2013
The eruption of Ilopango in El Salvador in 536AD sent millions of tons of ash into the Earth's atmosphere, causing a mini-ice age worldwide.
3	"Fire Twister"	TBA	22 April 2013
A look how Tokyo and around in Japan was devastated by an earthquake in 1923.
4	"The Lost Legions"	TBA	29 April 2013
A look at how thunderstorms halted the Roman advance into Germania in 9AD.
5	"God's Wrath"	TBA	13 May 2013
A look at the earthquake and tsunami and fire that hit Lisbon, Portugal, in 1755.
6	"Hitler's Frozen Army"	TBA	21 May 2013
This episode focuses on Operation Typhoon, Hitler's plans to invade Russia in 1941.
