= The Big Empty (The Expanse) =

- The Expanse episode
- Episode no.: Season 1 Episode 2
- Directed by: Terry McDonough
- Written by: Mark Fergus and Hawk Ostby
- Cinematography by: Jeremy Benning
- Original air date: December 15, 2015
- Running time: 42 minutes

Guest appearances
- Jay Hernandez as Dmitri Havelock; François Chau as Jules-Pierre Mao; Athena Karkanis as Octavia Muss; Kristen Hager as Ade Nygaard

Episode chronology
← Previous "Dulcinea"	Next → "Remember the Cant"

"The Big Empty" is the second episode of the first season of the American science fiction television series The Expanse. It originally premiered on Syfy in the United States on December 15, 2015, a day after its series premiere aired. The episode was written by creators Mark Fergus and Hawk Ostby, and directed by Terry McDonough.

"The Big Empty" continues the events of the previous episode, through the point-of-view of the show's initial three main characters: After the explosion of the Canterbury, former executive officer Jim Holden and his crew on the badly damaged space shuttle Knight try to survive with scarce air and supplies; Detective Miller continues his investigation of Julie Mao and deals with water rationing problems in Ceres Station; Deputy Undersecretary Chrisjen Avasarala continues her interrogation of imprisoned Outer Planets Alliance (OPA) member Heikki Sabong.

The episode received 854,000 viewers in its initial viewing, and received positive reviews from critics, with critics praising its world-building and characterization.

== Plot ==
=== The Knight ===
The space shuttle Knight is badly damaged by debris from the exploded Canterbury. Jim Holden (Steven Strait), the shuttle's commander, orders pilot Alex Kamal (Cas Anvar) to pursue the unidentified ship responsible, but engineer Naomi Nagata (Dominique Tipper) shuts down the engine to preserve fuel and to prevent Holden from doing anything rash. Along with medic Shed Garvey (Paulo Costanzo) and mechanic Amos Burton (Wes Chatham), they are stranded with four hours of oxygen, no radio and insufficient fuel to reach the nearest space station.

The crew goes out to investigate the antenna, but because the Knight's airlock has been breached by debris, it is a dangerous mission, and they must wear spacesuits and vent the ship's remaining atmosphere. Holden and Burton build an improvised antenna to send a distress call. The crew is relieved when the call is answered, but then discover it has been answered by the Martian Navy flagship MCRN Donnager.

Nagata has already identified Martian naval technology in the distress transponder from the Scopuli (the ship that the Canterbury was lured to,) indicating the Donnager was responsible for the trap they walked into, and for the destruction of the Canterbury. In the hopes of protecting themselves once they're taken by the Martian Navy, Holden sends out a transmission explaining that the Martian ship was responsible for destroying the Canterbury. He further states that if the five crew members are killed after being taken aboard the Donnager, it will be proof that the Martians are the ones who destroyed the Canterbury and killed everyone on board. He hopes that this transmission will serve as insurance against their captors killing them, but is not sure if the transmission went through. The Knight is then pulled into the Donnager where the five are apprehended by Martian soldiers at gunpoint.

=== Ceres Station ===
Detective Joe Miller (Thomas Jane) sneaks into the apartment of pilot and activist Julie Mao (Florence Faivre) to investigate her disappearance. Recent transmissions reveal a strained relationship with her wealthy father, who threatened to sell her racing ship. Miller and his partner Dimitri Havelock (Jay Hernandez) are sent to catch local Belter gangsters and recover stolen water. Although Miller catches them, he lets them go, after coming to admire their survivalist defiance, but tells them to stay away from the water. He then resumes his search for Julie and learns from Ceres Station's dock master that she had boarded the Scopuli.

=== UN Headquarters ===
Deputy Undersecretary Chrisjen Avasarala (Shohreh Aghdashloo) is reprimanded by UN Undersecretary Sadavir Errinwright (Shawn Doyle) for using banned torture techniques on OPA member Heikki Sabong (Joe Delfin). Avasarala believes that the contraband stealth tech that Sabong smuggled could cause a rift in the delicate balance between Earth and Mars. She sends Sabong to Luna for further interrogation, but then is told that he killed himself en route.

== Production ==
The episode, entitled "The Big Empty", was written by show creators Mark Fergus and Hawk Ostby, based on the first book of the novel series, Leviathan Wakes, and directed by Terry McDonough. It is the second overall episode of the series.

== Reception ==
=== Ratings ===
"The Big Empty" was watched by 854,000 American viewers on its initial viewing, and also acquired a 0.27 rating in the 18–49 demographic.

=== Critical response ===
The episode has received positive reviews from critics, who mostly lauded the show's continuing focus on world-building and its increasing characterization, especially the storyline involving Holden and his crew stranded in space. Chris Carabott of IGN gave the episode a rating of 8.5 out of 10, saying it "builds upon the exceptional world building that started in the first episode", and referred the storyline of Holden and his crew stranded in space as "fantastically executed", even though he felt the storyline on Earth "doesn't feel fully developed just yet."

Zack Handlen of The A.V. Club gave the episode a rating of B+, saying it "moves the story forward a few inches, and gets some thrills out of the Knight's predicament", even though "the awe and mystery of [the series premiere] are in shorter supply here", and considered it a bit inferior to the pilot episode. Michael Ahr of Den of Geek gave the episode of 4.5 out of 5, praising the episode's ability to give off "a sense that the delicate balance is about to shift dramatically keeps viewers leaning in towards their screens", and also mentioned the show's strengthened focus on great storytelling, especially commending on Holden's storyline.
