= Colin Thatcher =

Canadian politician and convicted murderer

MLA for Thunder Creek
- In office June 11, 1975 – 1984
- Preceded by: first member
- Succeeded by: Richard Swenson

Personal details
- Born: Wilbert Colin Thatcher; August 25, 1938 (age 88) Toronto, Ontario, Canada
- Party: Saskatchewan Progressive Conservative Party (1977-1984)
- Other political affiliations: Saskatchewan Liberal Party (1975-1977)
- Spouse: JoAnn Wilson (m. 1962; div. 1980)
- Parent: Ross Thatcher

Wilbert Colin Thatcher (born August 25, 1938) is a Canadian politician who was convicted for the murder of his ex-wife, JoAnn Wilson.

== Early life ==
Colin Thatcher was born in Toronto, Ontario, on August 25, 1938. His father, Saskatchewan-born Ross Thatcher, was working for Canada Packers, a predecessor of Maple Leaf Foods, at the time of his birth. He moved to Saskatchewan when his father returned home to run the family business. His father subsequently entered politics and became Premier of Saskatchewan from 1964 to 1971.

Thatcher began studying agriculture at the University of Saskatchewan. After one year, he transferred to Iowa State University. He graduated from Iowa State with B.S. and M.S. degrees in agriculture, and returned to Saskatchewan to work on his father's ranch in Moose Jaw.

== Political career ==
After his father's death in 1971, Thatcher cultivated his own interest in politics. In 1975, he won the provincial riding of Thunder Creek as a Liberal, but he defected to the Progressive Conservatives two years later. Thatcher served from 1982 to 1983 as the Minister of Energy in the government of Premier Grant Devine. On January 17, 1983, Thatcher resigned his portfolio, citing family and financial reasons.

== Personal life ==
=== Marriage and separation ===
Thatcher met his future wife JoAnn Geiger at the University of Iowa. They married on August 12, 1962, and had three children, Greg, Regan and Stephanie. Thatcher admitted to infidelity during the course of the marriage and the couple separated in August 1979. They ended up fighting a long, hotly contested series of custody, access and matrimonial property battles. In 1980, they were divorced and Geiger was awarded custody of two of their three children, as well as $820,000 for her share of the marital property. In January 1981, she married a local businessman, Tony Wilson, and became known as JoAnn Wilson.

On May 17, 1981, Wilson was shot and wounded while in the kitchen of her home. A bullet fired from a high-powered rifle passed through a triple-glazed glass window and struck her in the shoulder. As a result of the shooting, Wilson was hospitalized for about three weeks. No one was ever charged with the 1981 shooting.

=== Murder of ex-wife ===
On January 21, 1983, four days after Thatcher's resignation as Minister of Energy, Wilson was found bludgeoned and shot to death in the garage of her Regina home. Thatcher was formally charged on May 7, 1984, after a lengthy police investigation.

Thatcher was tried in Saskatoon for the murder of his ex-wife in the autumn of 1984. In addition to the evidence presented, he insisted on testifying so that he could try and explain the recorded conversation between Gary Anderson and him where they discussed hiring a hitman. He was found guilty under the prosecution of Crown Prosecutor Serge Kujawa and was given a sentence of life imprisonment, with no eligibility for parole for 25 years.

In late April 1985, two weeks before his appeal, a package postmarked Winnipeg arrived at the Regina Leader-Post. The package contained an anonymous confession to the murder of Wilson, a homemade hatchet the writer claimed was the murder weapon, and two photographs of a nude woman whom the letter claimed was Wilson. The newspaper turned the package over to the Regina Police. After numerous requests for disclosure of the photos and hatchet, the Crown eventually admitted to Thatcher's lawyer that they had been lost.

On November 30, 2006, Thatcher was granted full parole. He subsequently remarried in 2010.

Thatcher wrote a 440-page book about his case, Final Appeal: Anatomy of a Frame. It was released by ECW Press on September 1, 2009. In reaction to the book’s publication, the Government of Saskatchewan introduced the Profits of Criminal Notoriety Act and a judge ordered the surrender of any proceeds to the Ministry of Justice. In 2011, funds from the sale of the book in the amount of $13,866.44 were turned over to the Ministry of Justice. The province subsequently donated the funds to two groups assisting victims of domestic violence and survivors of homicide.

==== In popular culture ====
In 1985, author Maggie Siggins wrote the book A Canadian Tragedy: JoAnn and Colin Thatcher: A Story of Love and Hate. A two-part television mini-series based on the book called Love and Hate: The Story of Colin and JoAnn Thatcher was produced by CBC Television in 1989, starring Kenneth Welsh as Colin Thatcher and Kate Nelligan as JoAnn Thatcher Wilson.

== Biographies ==
- Bird, Heather. Not Above The Law: The Tragic Story of JoAnn Wilson and Colin Thatcher. Toronto: Key Porter Books Limited, 1985.
- Mankiewicz, Francis, director. Love and Hate: The Story of Colin and JoAnn Thatcher. (Television movie.) Canadian Broadcasting Corporation, 1989. This film starred Kenneth Welsh and Kate Nelligan as Colin and JoAnn Thatcher.
- Siggins, Maggie. A Canadian Tragedy, JoAnn & Colin Thatcher: A Story of Love and Hate. Toronto: McClelland & Stewart, 1985.
- Thatcher, Colin. Backrooms: A Story of Politics. Douglas & McIntyre, 1985.
- Wilson, Garrett & Lesley Wilson. Deny, Deny, Deny: The Rise and Fall of Colin Thatcher. Toronto: James Lorimer & Company, 1986.
