= Maggie Siggins =

Canadian journalist and writer (born 1942)

- Born: Marjorie May Siggins; 28 May 1942 (age 84); Toronto, Ontario, Canada
- Education: BAA (Journalism), 1965
- Alma mater: Ryerson
- Occupations: journalist, author
- Awards: 1992 Governor General's Award

Marjorie May "Maggie" Siggins (born 28 May 1942) is a Canadian journalist and writer. She was a recipient of the 1992 Governor General's Award for Literary Merit for her non-fiction work Revenge of the Land: A Century of Greed, Tragedy and Murder on a Saskatchewan Farm. She was also the recipient of the 1986 Arthur Ellis Award for "Best true crime book" for her work A Canadian Tragedy, about the involvement of former Saskatchewan politician Colin Thatcher in the murder of his wife JoAnn Wilson. The book was later adapted into the television miniseries Love and Hate: The Story of Colin and JoAnn Thatcher.

Siggins is also noted as the author of a biography of Louis Riel entitled Riel: A Life of Revolution. In Her Own time: A Class Reunion Inspires a Cultural History of Women and Bitter Embrace:White Society's Assault on the Woodland Cree are her last two books. Both Revenge of the Land and A Canadian Tragedy were adapted as television mini-series by the Canadian Broadcasting Corporation.

She is also the former chair of the Writers' Union of Canada.

== Literary works ==
- Siggins, Maggie (1985). A Canadian Tragedy: JoAnn and Colin Thatcher: A Story of Love and Hate. McClelland & Stewart, Toronto. ISBN 0-7710-8059-X.
- Siggins, Maggie (1991). Revenge of the Land: A Century of Greed, Tragedy and Murder on a Saskatchewan Farm. McClelland & Stewart, Toronto. ISBN 0-7710-8155-3.
- Siggins, Maggie (1994). Riel: a life of revolution. HarperCollins, Toronto. ISBN 0-00-215792-6. (Published in French under the title Riel: une vie de révolution, Québec-Amérique, 1997.)
- Siggins, Maggie (2000). In Her Own Time: A Class Reunion Inspires a Cultural History of Women. Harper Collins, Toronto. ISBN 0-00-255431-3.
- Siggins, Maggie (2005). Bitter Embrace: White Society's Assault on the Woodland Cree. McClelland & Stewart, Toronto. ISBN 0-7710-8060-3.
- Siggins, Maggie (2008). Marie-Anne: The Extraordinary Life of Louis Riel's Grandmother. McClelland & Stewart, Toronto. ISBN 978-0-7710-8029-6. (Published in French under the title Marie-Anne, La vie extraordinaire de la grand-mère de Louis Riel, Le Septentrion, 2011.)
