= Love and Hate: The Story of Colin and JoAnn Thatcher =

- Based on: A Canadian Tragedy: JoAnn and Colin Thatcher: A Story of Love and Hate by Maggie Siggins
- Written by: Suzette Couture
- Directed by: Francis Mankiewicz
- Starring: Kenneth Welsh; Kate Nelligan
- Theme music composer: Eric Robertson
- Country of origin: Canada
- Original language: English
- No. of episodes: 2

Production
- Producer: Bernard Zukerman
- Cinematography: Vic Sarin
- Editor: Gordon McClellan
- Running time: 240 minutes

Original release
- Network: CBC Television
- Release: December 3 – December 4, 1989

Love and Hate: The Story of Colin and JoAnn Thatcher is a Canadian television miniseries, directed by Francis Mankiewicz and broadcast by CBC Television in 1989. Based on Maggie Siggins's 1985 book A Canadian Tragedy: JoAnn and Colin Thatcher: A Story of Love and Hate, the film dramatizes the story of Colin Thatcher, a former Canadian politician who was convicted in 1984 of the murder of his ex-wife JoAnn following their divorce.

The two-part miniseries starred Kenneth Welsh as Colin Thatcher and Kate Nelligan as JoAnn Thatcher Wilson. Its cast also included Noam Zylberman, Leon Pownall, Brent Carver, Laura Bruneau, Cedric Smith, Victoria Snow, Stuart Hughes, John Colicos, Peter MacNeill, Gabrielle Rose, R. H. Thomson, Eugene Lipinski, Timothy Webber, Doris Petrie and Lenore Zann in supporting roles.

The series aired December 3 and 4, 1989 on CBC Television. It was also subsequently broadcast in July 1990 on NBC in the United States, under the title Love and Hate: A Marriage Made in Hell.

Thatcher, who was still protesting his innocence of the murder and attempting to pursue a retrial, criticized the film as inaccurate, and sued both Siggins and the CBC in 1994 on the grounds that the film could jeopardize his chances of retrial or parole. The lawsuit was not decided in Thatcher's favour.

== Awards ==
Award	Date of ceremony	Category	Nominees	Result	Reference
Gemini Awards	December 4, 1990	Best Dramatic Miniseries	Bernard Zukerman	Won	
Gemini Awards	December 4, 1990	Best Actor in a Dramatic Program or Miniseries	Kenneth Welsh	Won	
Gemini Awards	December 4, 1990	Best Direction in a Dramatic Program or Mini-Series	Francis Mankiewicz	Won	
Gemini Awards	December 4, 1990	Best Writing in a Dramatic Program or Mini-Series	Suzette Couture	Won	
Gemini Awards	December 4, 1990	Best Photography in a Dramatic Program or Series	Vic Sarin	Won	
Gemini Awards	December 4, 1990	Best Actress in a Dramatic Program or Miniseries	Kate Nelligan	Nominated	
Gemini Awards	December 4, 1990	Best Supporting Actor	Eugene Lipinski	Nominated	
Gemini Awards	December 4, 1990	Best Picture Editing in a Dramatic Program or Series	Gordon McClellan	Nominated	
Gemini Awards	December 4, 1990	Best Original Music Score for a Program or Mini-Series	Eric Robertson	Nominated	
