= Kenneth Welsh =

Canadian actor (1942–2022)

Kenneth Welsh CM
- Welsh in 1960
- Born: Kenneth Clifford Welsh; March 30, 1942; Edmonton, Alberta, Canada
- Died: May 5, 2022 (aged 80); Sandford, Ontario, Canada
- Education: University of Alberta; National Theatre School of Canada
- Occupation: Actor
- Years active: 1964–2022
- Spouse: Lynne Mcilvride (m. 2022)
- Children: Devon Welsh

Kenneth Clifford Welsh CM (March 30, 1942 – May 5, 2022) was a Canadian actor, who made over 300 stage, film and television appearances over a nearly 60-year career.

Educated at the National Theatre School, he was a member of the Stratford Shakespeare Festival for six years, before to New York and appearing in many Off-Broadway and Broadway plays. Beginning in the late 1970s, he worked regularly in film and television, both in Canada and the United States. He was well known to television audiences for his portrayal of the multi-faceted villain Windom Earle on Twin Peaks (1990–91, 2017), and for playing Dr. Watson in a series of CTV Sherlock Holmes telefilms.

He was a four-time Genie Award nominee—winning Best Supporting Actor for his performance in Margaret's Museum (1996), with Best Actor nods for Reno and the Doc (1984) and Loyalties (1986). He also won four Gemini Awards, and was nominated for a Daytime Emmy Award. In 2003, he was acclaimed to the Order of Canada.

== Early life and education ==
Welsh was born in Edmonton, Alberta, to a father who worked for the Canadian National Railway and mother who worked in a dress shop. He studied drama at school, as Alberta was the only province at the time which included drama on the curriculum. He continued his acting studies at the University of Alberta under Gordon Peacock, before moving to Montreal to attend the National Theatre School. He graduated in 1965.

Following graduation, he auditioned for the Stratford Festival in Ontario and then spent the first seven years of his career on stage.

== Career ==
=== Theatre ===
Following graduation, Welsh joined the Stratford Festival in Ontario. He made his debut during the 1966 season in Henry V, playing Sir Thomas Grey. He spent the next six years with the Festival, appearing in numerous Shakespearean roles. After their highly-successful 1973 European tour, he left the Festival, and took stints at the Guthrie Theater in Minneapolis and the Goodman Theatre in Chicago. He was a member of the Guthrie's ensemble company during the mid-1970s under artistic director Michael Langham. In 1975, he won a Joseph Jefferson Award for his performance in The Resistible Rise of Arturo Ui at the Goodman.

He made his Off-Broadway debut in the world premiere of Curse of the Starving Class at The Public Theater, and his Broadway debut in The Government Inspector. During the 1980s, he starred in such notable Broadway productions as Piaf, The Real Thing, Social Security, and Frankie and Johnny in the Clair de Lune. He directed and starred in multiple acclaimed stagings of the Dylan Thomas-penned radio drama Under Milk Wood.

Welsh also wrote the book for Standup Shakespeare, a cabaret musical that sets Shakespearean dialogue to contemporary jazz, baroque, samba and gospel-rock music.

In the 2010s, he was a member of Toronto's Soulpepper Theatre Company.

=== Film ===
He was a two-time Genie Award nominee for Best Actor, receiving nods at the 6th Genie Awards in 1985 for his portrayal of Reno Colt in the film Reno and the Doc and at the 8th Genie Awards in 1987 for his performance as David Sutton in Loyalties, and a two-time Genie nominee for Best Supporting Actor, receiving a nomination at the 5th Genie Awards in 1984 for Tell Me That You Love Me and winning the award at the 16th Genie Awards in 1996 for Margaret's Museum.

Reno and the Doc was written and directed by Charles Dennis; in 1997, Welsh directed Dennis in the latter's play SoHo Duo at the West Bank Theatre in New York City.

Welsh has portrayed historical figures including Thomas E. Dewey, Colin Thatcher, Harry S. Truman (twice), Thomas Edison, James "Scotty" Reston, General Harry Crerar and James Baker. He played Thomas Norval Hepburn, the father of Katharine Hepburn, in Martin Scorsese's The Aviator (2004).

His role as the vice-president of the United States in the 2004 environmental disaster film The Day After Tomorrow sparked some controversy due to his physical resemblance to Dick Cheney, the real-life vice-president at the time. Director Roland Emmerich later confirmed that he deliberately chose Welsh for that very reason. Emmerich stated that the character of the vice-president in the film was intended to be a not-so-subtle criticism of the environmental policies of the George W. Bush administration.

=== Television ===
Welsh's best-known television role is as Windom Earle, the primary antagonist and cunning foil to Dale Cooper, during the second season of the Twin Peaks (1990–91, 2017). He played Dr. Watson in a series of CTV Sherlock Holmes telefilms, opposite Matt Frewer as Holmes.

Welsh won four Gemini Awards out of six total nominations—Best Actor in a Leading Role in a Dramatic Program or Limited Series for And Then You Die (1987), Love and Hate: The Story of Colin and JoAnn Thatcher (1987), and Hiroshima (1995). He won Best Supporting Actor in a Drama Program or Series for Deadly Betrayal: The Bruce Curtis Story. He was nominated for a Daytime Emmy Award for Outstanding Performer in Children's Programming for his performance in the HBO telefilm Edison: The Wizard of Light.

He made guest appearances on numerous series, including Seeing Things, the 1980s revival of The Twilight Zone, The X-Files, Due South, Law & Order, The Practice, Murdoch Mysteries, Stargate Atlantis, Slings & Arrows, The Expanse, The Blacklist, Lodge 49 and The Kids in the Hall.

== Honours ==
In 2003, he was made a Member of the Order of Canada.

== Personal life ==
Welsh married Lynne Mcilvride in March 2022. He had a son, musician Devon Welsh (b. 1988), from his previous marriage.

Welsh was baptized by Anglican priest Rev. RuthAnne Ward in his house in the last months of his life. He was also a follower of American spiritual teacher Adi Da, who primarily focused on prioritizing spiritual enlightenment, Welsh narrated Da's 2000 audiobook, "What, Where, When, How, Why, and Who to Remember to Be Happy".

=== Death ===
Welsh died on May 5, 2022, at the age of 80, from cancer. His son Devon announced on Twitter: "My dad passed away on Thursday peacefully at home. I will always love him beyond words. He lived a wonderful life, he was the best father I could have asked for, and he touched so many lives. Please make a toast, watch a film/TV show he was in, celebrate a giant of acting."

Upon his death, the official ACTRA Twitter account eulogized him saying "Ken was one of Canada's all-time great performers, with hundreds of memorable roles spanning decades."

His ashes were scattered in Lake Ontario following cremation.

== Partial stage credits ==
Year	Title	Role(s)	Venue(s)	Other notes	Ref.
1966	Henry V	Sir Thomas Grey / Ensemble member	Festival Theatre, Stratford		
1966	Henry VI	First Murderer / Captain to Talbot / Lord Talbot (understudy)	Festival Theatre, Stratford		
1966	Twelfth Night	Ensemble member / Feste (understudy)	Festival Theatre, Stratford		
1967	Richard III	Lord Hastings	Festival Theatre, Stratford		
1967	The Merry Wives of Windsor	Fenton	Festival Theatre, Stratford		
1967	Antony and Cleopatra	Octavius Caesar	Festival Theatre, Stratford		
1968	A Midsummer Night's Dream	Tom Snout	Festival Theatre, Stratford		
1968	The Three Musketeers	Laporte / Lord de Winter / d'Artagnan (understudy)	Festival Theatre, Stratford		
1968	Tartuffe	Damis	Festival Theatre, Stratford		
1969	Hamlet	Hamlet	Festival Theatre, Stratford		
1969	Tartuffe	Damis	Festival Theatre, Stratford		
1971	Macbeth	Macduff	Festival Theatre, Stratford		
1971	Much Ado About Nothing	Benedick	Festival Theatre, Stratford		
1972	Lorenzaccio	Alessandro de' Medici	Festival Theatre, Stratford		
1972	King Lear	Edgar	Festival Theatre, Stratford		
1972	As You Like It	Sir Oliver Martext	Festival Theatre, Stratford		
1973	Becket		Guthrie Theater, Minneapolis		
1973	The Merchant of Venice		Guthrie Theater, Minneapolis		
1974	King Lear		Guthrie Theater, Minneapolis		
1974	The School for Scandal		Guthrie Theater, Minneapolis		
1975	Under Milk Wood		Guthrie Theater, Minneapolis	As director	
1976	A Streetcar Named Desire	Stanley Kowalski	McCarter Theatre, Princeton		
1977	Misalliance	Joey Percival	Williamstown Theatre Festival, Williamstown		
1978	Curse of the Starving Class	Taylor	The Public Theater, New York		
1978	The Government Inspector	Ivan Kuzmich Shpekin	Circle in the Square Theatre, New York		
1979	Whose Life Is It Anyway?	Philip Hill	Trafalgar Theatre, New York		
1981	Piaf	Georges Moustaki / Police Inspector / Physiotherapist / Angelo (understudy)	Plymouth Theatre, New York		
1983–84	The Real Thing	Max	Plymouth Theatre, New York		
1986–87	Social Security	Martin Heyman	Ethel Barrymore Theatre, New York		
1987	A Walk in the Woods	John Honeyman	Yale Repertory Theatre, New Haven		
1987–89	Frankie and Johnny in the Clair de Lune	Johnny	New York City Center, New York	Replacement	
1987–89	Frankie and Johnny in the Clair de Lune	Johnny	Westside Theatre, New York	Replacement	
1997	The Little Foxes	Horace Giddens	Lincoln Center Theater, New York		
2000	Under Milk Wood		Glenn Gould Studio, Toronto	For Stratford Festival	
2007	Leaving Home	Jacob	Young Centre for the Performing Arts, Toronto		
2008	Under Milk Wood		Young Centre for the Performing Arts, Toronto		
2009	Of the Fields, Lately	Jacob	Young Centre for the Performing Arts, Toronto		
2009	Rock 'n' Roll	Max	Citadel Theatre, Edmonton		
2009	Rock 'n' Roll	Max	Bluma Appel Theatre, Toronto		
2009	Rock 'n' Roll	Max	Shoctor Theatre, Edmonton		
2010	Jitters		Young Centre for the Performing Arts, Toronto		
2011	The Homecoming	Sam	American Conservatory Theater, San Francisco		
2012	The Sunshine Boys	Al Lewis	Young Centre for the Performing Arts, Toronto		
2013	Rosencrantz and Guildenstern Are Dead	Player	Young Centre for the Performing Arts, Toronto		
2016	A Coal Mine Christmas		Coal Mine Theatre, Toronto		

== Filmography ==
=== Film ===
Year	Title	Role	Notes	Ref.
1965	The Overfamiliar Subordinate		NFB short documentary	
1974	Piaf			
1976	Brethren	Ralph		
1980	Double Negative	Dr. Klifter		
1980	Phobia	Sgt. Joe Wheeler		
1983	Tell Me That You Love Me	David	Nominated – Genie Award for Best Performance by an Actor in a Supporting Role	
1983	Of Unknown Origin	James Hall		
1983	Hot Money	Parker		
1984	Covergirl	Harrison		
1984	Falling in Love	Doctor		
1984	Reno and the Doc	Reno	Nominated – Genie Award for Best Performance by an Actor in a Leading Role	
1985	Perfect	Joe McKenzie		
1985	The War Boy	Stephan Berecky		
1986	Lost!	Jim		
1986	The Climb	Walter Frauenberger		
1986	Loyalties	David Sutton	Nominated – Genie Award for Best Performance by an Actor in a Leading Role	
1986	Heartburn	Dr. Appel		
1987	Radio Days	Radio Voice		
1987	And Then You Die	Eddie Griffin		
1988	The House on Carroll Street	Hackett		
1988	Crocodile Dundee II	Brannigan		
1988	Another Woman	Donald		
1989	The January Man	Roger Culver		
1989	Physical Evidence	Harry Norton		
1990	Straight Line	Dr. Hammel		
1990	The Freshman	Dwight Armstrong		
1990	Perfectly Normal	Charlie Glesby		
1991	The Big Slice	Lieutenant Bernard		
1992	Eli's Lesson	Uncle Yakub		
1993	Les amoureuses	David		
1994	Death Wish V: The Face of Death	Lieutenant Mickey King		
1994	Whale Music	Kenneth Sexstone		
1994	Timecop	Senator Utley		
1994	Legends of the Fall	Sheriff Tynert		
1994	Boozecan	Tim		
1995	Hideaway	Detective Breech		
1995	Margaret's Museum	Angus MacNeil	Genie Award for Best Performance by an Actor in a Supporting Role	
1996	Portraits of a Killer	Jim Miller		
1996	Rowing Through	Harry Parker		
1996	Turning April	Father		
1997	Habitat	Coach Marlowe		
1997	Absolute Power	Sandy Lord		
1997	The Wrong Guy	Mr. Nagel		
1999	External Affairs	Michael Riordan		
2000	Love Come Down	Ira Rosen		
2000	Bad Faith	Chief Inspector Brodsky		
2001	Focus	Father Crighton		
2004	Miracle	George "Doc" Nagobads		
2004	The Wild Guys	Andy		
2004	The Day After Tomorrow	Vice President Raymond Becker		
2004	The Aviator	Thomas Norval Hepburn		
2005	Four Brothers	Robert Bradford		
2005	Bailey's Billion$	Mouse Delaney		
2005	The Exorcism of Emily Rose	Dr. Mueller	Credited as 'Ken Welsh'	
2005	The Fog	Tom Malone		
2006	The Covenant	Provost Higgins		
2006	One Way	William Henderson		
2007	Fantastic Four: Rise of the Silver Surfer	Dr. Jeff Wagner		
2007	Silk	Mayor Joncour		
2008	Adoration	Morris		
2008	Kit Kittredge: An American Girl	Uncle Hendrick		
2008	Nothing Really Matters	Joe		
2009	Survival of the Dead	Patrick O'Flynn		
2012	The Riverbank	Joe Mason		
2012	The Story of Luke	Grandpa Jonas		
2013	Cottage Country	Earl		
2013	The Art of the Steal	"Uncle" Paddy McCarthy		
2014	Wet Bum	Ed		
2015	The Ballad of Immortal Joe	The Narrator	Short	
2016	The Void	Dr. Richard Powell		
2017	Chicanery	Pringle Hewitt		
2017	Awakening the Zodiac	Ben		
2017	Undercover Grandpa	Harry		
2019	And the Birds Rained Down	Boychuck		
2020	PG: Psycho Goreman	Narrator / Judicator		
2021	The Middle Man	Mr. Miller		
2022	Midnight at the Paradise	Max	Posthumous release	
2023	Deadly Draw	Hal Hewitt	Posthumous release	
2024	Campton Manor	Lawrence	Posthumous release	
2024	Afterwards	Garen	Posthumous release	

=== Television ===
Year	Title	Role	Other notes	Ref.
1975	Great Performances	Oliver Surface	Episode: "The School for Scandal"	
1977–84	For the Record	Various	3 episodes	
1979	The Great Detective	Henry Lyall	Episode: "Murder at Blenheim Swamp"	
1981	CBS Children's Mystery Theatre	Sergeant Hawkins	Episode: "Mystery at Fire Island"	
1985	The Ray Bradbury Theater	Crane	Episode: "Marionettes, Inc."	
1986	Seeing Things	Sutherland	Episode: "The Walls Have Eyes"	
1987	Spenser: For Hire	Lt. Webster Bloom / Lt. Nicholas Webster	2 episodes	
1988	T. and T.	Dr. Hammel	3 episodes	
1988	The Twilight Zone	Jack Simonson	Episode: "Acts of Terror"	
1989	Gideon Oliver	Father Brian Halloran	Episode: "By the Waters of Babylon"	
1990	The Ray Bradbury Theater	Captain Wilder	Episode: "And the Moon Be Still as Bright"	
1990	Street Legal	George Wilson	Episode: "Standard of Care"	
1990–91	Twin Peaks	Windom Earle	10 episodes	
1991	Love, Lies and Murder	Stanfield	2 episodes	
1991	Beyond Reality	Joe / Revere	Episode: "The Doppelgänger"	
1992	Cruel Doubt	Attorney Wade Smith	2 episodes	
1992	Summit on Ice	Narrator	Documentary	
1993	Scales of Justice	Crown attorney	Episode "Regina v Truscott"	
1994	Kung Fu: The Legend Continues	Vance Cavanaugh	Episode: "Temple"	
1994	Lonesome Dove: The Series	The Colonel	Episode: "Duty Bound"	
1995	The X-Files	Simon Gates	Episode: "Revelations"	
1996–99	Due South	Randal K. Bolt / Cyrus Bolt	3 episodes	
1997	The Outer Limits	Dr. Vasquez	Episode: "Tempests"	
1997	The Hunger	Hugo Lawery	Episode: "The Secret Shih Tan"	
1998	Dead Man's Gun	Dean Marley	Episode: "The Gambler"	
1998	Law & Order	Ben O'Dell	Episode: "Disappeared"	
1998	Eerie, Indiana: The Other Dimension	Buck Corona III	Episode: "The Jackalope"	
2000	Twitch City	Mr. Surdjic	2 episodes	
2000	Falcone		Episode: "Paying the Piper"	
2000	D.C.	Neil	3 episodes	
2000	Murder Call	James Florie	Episode: "Done to Death"	
2001	Witchblade	Capt. Joe Siri	2 episodes	
2001	The Guardian		Episode: "Reunion"; uncredited	
2002	Soul Food	Dr. Jackson Pruit	2 episodes	
2003	The Practice	Judge M. Harrod	3 episodes	
2004	ReGenesis	Dr. Shelby Sloane	3 episodes	
2004	H_{2}O	Randall Spear	2 episodes	
2005	This Is Wonderland		Episode #2.3	
2005	Tilt	Seymour Annisman	2 episodes	
2005	The Murdoch Mysteries	Inspector Ramsgate	Episode: "Under the Dragon's Tail"	
2005	Smallville	Drunk Santa	Episode: "Lexmas"	
2006	Covert One: The Hades Factor	General Keilburger	2 episodes	
2006	Slings & Arrows	Himself	Episode: "Divided Kingdom"	
2007	Stargate Atlantis	Jamus	Episode: "The Ark"	
2007	Bionic Woman	Prof. Howard Samuels	Episode: "The Education of Jaime Sommers"	
2007	St. Urbain's Horseman	Justice Beale	Episode: "Part 1 & 2"	
2008	The Trojan Horse	Randall Spear	Episode: "Part One"	
2010	Human Target	Belvilacqua	Episode: "Corner Man"	
2011	Haven	Cole Glendower	Episode: "The Tides That Bind"	
2011	Being Erica	Matthew Wexlar	Episode: "Sins of the Father"	
2012	Less Than Kind	Henley	Episode: "Coming Around"	
2012	The Listener	Albert Jacoby	Episode: "Captain Nightfall"	
2012	XIII: The Series	Dr. Westlund	Episode: "Tempest"	
2013	Perfect Storm: Disasters That Changed The World	Narrator	6 episodes	
2014	The Best Laid Plans	Angus McClintock	6 episodes	
2014	The Divide	Stanley Zale	5 episodes	
2015	Mr. D	Francis Duncan	Episode: "Corporal Punishment"	
2015	The Expanse	Frank Degraaf	Episode: "Remember the Cant"	
2017	The Blacklist	Werner von Hauser	Episode: "Dr. Bogdan Krilov (No. 29)"	
2017	Saving Hope	Wilfred Jennings	Episode: "All Our Yesterdays"	
2017	Salvation	Andrew Bartok	Episode: "From Russia, with Love"	
2018–19	Lodge 49	Larry Loomis	8 episodes	
2020	Star Trek: Discovery	Senna Tal	Episodes: "People of Earth", "Forget Me Not"	
2021	Charmed	Fenric the Vile	2 episodes	
2022	The Kids in the Hall	Martin	1 episode Posthumous release	

==== TV films and miniseries ====
Year	Title	Role	Ref.
1969	The Three Musketeers	D'Artagnan	
1979	Riel	McWilliams	
1980	F.D.R.: The Last Year	Thomas E. Dewey	
1983	Empire, Inc.	Sir James Munroe	
1985	Love and Larceny	Ira Reynolds	
1985	The Cuckoo Bird	Harry	
1986	Murder Sees the Light	The Evangelist	
1988	The Murder of Mary Phagan	Luther Rosser	
1988	Liberace: Behind the Music		
1989	Champagne Charlie	John Whistlow	
1989	Dick Francis: Blood Sport	Harry Teller	
1989	Love and Hate: The Story of Colin and JoAnn Thatcher	Colin Thatcher	
1990	Murder Times Seven	Nick Ruggieri	
1990	The Last Best Year	Jerry	
1990	The Widowmaker	Atkinson	
1992	A Mother's Right: The Elizabeth Morgan Story	Paul Michel	
1992	Dead Ahead: The Exxon Valdez Disaster	Sam Skinner	
1992	The Good Fight	Dick Chandler	
1993	Woman on the Run: The Lawrencia Bembenek Story	Don Eisenberg	
1993	Shattered Trust: The Shari Karney Story	Judge Norton	
1993	Dieppe	Maj. Gen. Harry Crerar	
1994	And Then There Was One	David Burns	
1994	Getting Gotti	Bennett	
1994	The Diary of Evelyn Lau	Larry	
1995	Choices of the Heart: The Margaret Sanger Story	Mr. Higgins	
1995	Vanished	Bill Palmer	
1995	Hiroshima	President Harry S. Truman	
1995	Kissinger and Nixon	James "Scotty" Reston	
1996	Escape Clause	Owen Jessop	
1997	Dead Silence	Sheriff Lenny Budd	
1997	Joe Torre: Curveballs Along the Way	George Steinbrenner	
1997	The Third Twin	Preston Barck	
1998	The Taking of Pelham One Two Three	Caz Hollowitz	
1998	Thunder Point	Armstrong	
1998	Thanks of a Grateful Nation	Sen. Shelby	
1998	Dead Husbands	Chase Woodward	
1998	Edison: The Wizard of Light	Thomas Edison	
1999	G-Saviour	General Garneaux	
1999	Vendetta	Mayor Joe Shakspeare	
2000	Who Killed Atlanta's Children?	William Kunstler	
2000	Deliberate Intent	Peder Lund	
2000	Witchblade	Joe Siri	
2000	The Hound of the Baskervilles	Dr. Watson	
2001	Haven	Harry Truman	
2001	Sanctuary	Sam Hathaway	
2001	The Sign of Four	Dr. Watson	
2001	The Royal Scandal	Dr. Watson	
2001	The Day Reagan Was Shot	James Baker	
2002	The Case of the Whitechapel Vampire	Dr. Watson	
2002	The Man Who Saved Christmas	Newton Baker	
2003	The Pentagon Papers	John McNaughton	
2003	Ice Bound: A Woman's Survival at the South Pole	Dr. Ben Murdoch	
2003	Eloise at the Plaza	Sir Wilkes	
2003	Eloise at Christmastime	Sir Wilkes	
2005	Karol: A Man Who Became Pope	Professor Wójcik	
2005	Our Fathers	Bishop Murphy	
2005	Category 7: The End of the World	Chief of Staff Alan Horst	
2005	The Snow Queen	King	
2006	Above and Beyond	Lord Beaverbrook	
2007	Superstorm	Richard Hughes	
2007	Booky and the Secret Santa	Mr. Eaton	
2008	A Very Merry Daughter of the Bride	Jack	
2009	Grey Gardens	Max Gordon	
2009	The Last Templar	Bill Vance	
2013	Rewind	President	
2015	The Lizzie Borden Chronicles	Lizzie's Lawyer	
