= CQB (The Expanse) =

- The Expanse episode
- Episode no.: Season 1 Episode 4
- Directed by: Jeff Woolnough
- Written by: Naren Shankar
- Cinematography by: Jeremy Benning
- Original air date: December 29, 2015
- Running time: 42 minutes

Guest appearances
- Chad L. Coleman as Fred Johnson; Jay Hernandez as Dmitri Havelock; Athena Karkanis as Octavia Muss; Brian George as Arjun Rao; Greg Bryk as Lopez

Episode chronology
← Previous "Remember the Cant"	Next → "Back to the Butcher"

"CQB" is the fourth episode of the first season of the American science fiction television series The Expanse. It initially aired on Syfy in the United States on December 29, 2015, a week after the previous episode, and was watched by 633,000 viewers in its initial viewing. The episode was written by Naren Shankar and directed by Jeff Woolnough.

The episode continues the events of the previous episode, following three main characters: James Holden, former executive officer of the Canterbury; Josephus Miller, a detective on Ceres; and Chrisjen Avasarala, a politician from Earth.

== Plot ==
On the Donnager, the unknown ship on an intercept course does not respond to orders to turn back. The Donnager launches torpedoes at the incoming ship, which is revealed to be six separate ships. Shed Garvey (Paulo Costanzo) is decapitated by a railgun shot from the enemy vessels. James Holden (Steven Strait), on the bridge, recognizes the ships attacking the Donnager as the same type that destroyed the Canterbury. Captain Yao, knowing that Holden is the only person who can testify to this, orders Lieutenant Lopez to evacuate him on a corvette, the Tachi. Holden refuses to leave without his crewmates, which Lopez reluctantly agrees to. They escape on the Tachi, after which the Donnager self-destructs to avoid capture.

The episode introduces Fred Johnson (Chad L. Coleman), manager of Tycho Station, where a generation ship, the Nauvoo, is being constructed, funded by the Mormon Church. Johnson orders the Nauvoo's sensors turned towards the Donnager. On Ceres, Detective Miller (Thomas Jane) continues his search for Julie Mao. He discovers that Mao was in contact with a data broker, and removes a memory crypt from the broker's corpse.

== Reception ==
=== Ratings ===
"CQB" was watched by 633 thousand American viewers on its initial viewing, with a 0.17 rating in the 18-49 demographic.

=== Critical response ===
The episode received a positive response, with many reviewers calling it the best episode yet. Chris Carabott of IGN rated the episode 9 out of 10, calling the episode "action packed and full of suspense." Kollin Lore of SpoilerTV also gave the episode 9 out of 10, stating that "each week has truly been an improvement over the last." Zack Handlen of The A.V. Club gave a less positive review, praising the series' worldbuilding but calling the characters "at best perfectly fine, and at worst immediately forgettable." Michael Ahr of Den of Geek gave the episode 4.5 out of 5, describing it as "refreshingly realistic and impressive".
