= The Ballad of Immortal Joe =

- Directed by: Hector Herrera
- Produced by: Pazit Cahlon
- Starring: Kenneth Welsh
- Music by: The Sadies
- Release date: September 12, 2015 (TIFF)
- Running time: 7 minutes
- Country: Canada
- Language: English

The Ballad of Immortal Joe is a Canadian animated short film, which premiered at the 2015 Toronto International Film Festival. Directed by Hector Herrera and written and produced by Pazit Cahlon, the film is a tribute to the cowboy poetry of Robert W. Service. The film, the third installment in Herrera's "Beastly Bards" series of animated shorts, is narrated by actor Kenneth Welsh, and soundtracked by the alternative country band The Sadies.

In 2016 the film won the Canadian Screen Award for Best Animated Short at the 4th Canadian Screen Awards.
