= Mark Fergus and Hawk Ostby =

American screenwriters

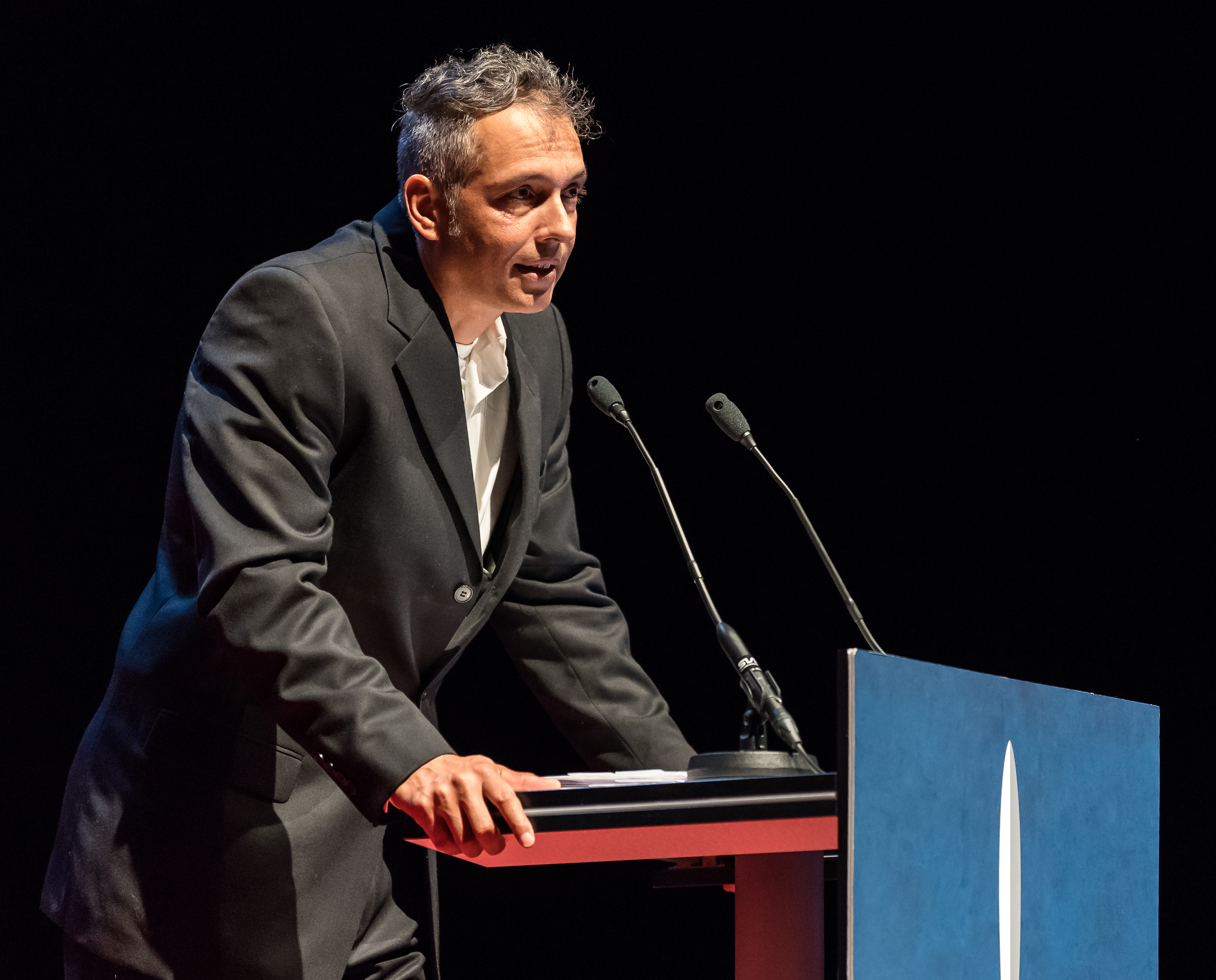
Hawk Ostby, accepting a Hugo Award in Helsinki in 2017.

Mark Fergus and Hawk Ostby are a duo of screenwriters.

They are best known for their work on The Expanse, Iron Man and Children of Men, which the latter earned them a nomination for the Academy Award for Best Adapted Screenplay.

== Filmography ==
Film writers

Year	Title	Director	Notes
2003	Consequence	Anthony Hickox	
2006	First Snow	Mark Fergus	
2006	Children of Men	Alfonso Cuarón	
2008	Iron Man	Jon Favreau	
2011	Cowboys & Aliens	Jon Favreau	
2019	The Last Vermeer	Dan Friedkin	
TBA	Dulcinea de Las Vegas	Mark Fergus	Also producers

Television

Year	Title	Writers	Executive Producers	Creators	Notes
2015–2022	The Expanse	Yes	Yes	Yes	Wrote 9 episodes
