= Jeremy Benning =

Canadian cinematographer

Jeremy Benning is a Canadian cinematographer. He is most noted for his work on the film 40 Acres, for which he won the Canadian Screen Award for Best Cinematography at the 14th Canadian Screen Awards in 2026.

== Filmography ==
=== Film ===
- Afghan Luke - 2011
- Textuality - 2011
- Moving Day - 2012
- We Were Children - 2012
- October Gale - 2014
- Trailer Park Boys: Don't Legalize It - 2014
- Spin - 2021
- 40 Acres - 2024
- Skyking - 2026
- Back in Black - 2026

=== Television ===
- Killing Lincoln - 2013
- The Expanse - 2015–2024
- The Boys - 2019–2026
- Guillermo del Toro's Cabinet of Curiosities - 2022
- Accused - 2023–2024
- Cross - 2024–present

== Awards ==
Award	Date of ceremony	Category	Work	Result	Ref.
American Society of Cinematographers	2013	Outstanding Achievement in Cinematography, Television Movie/Miniseries	Killing Lincoln	Won	
American Society of Cinematographers	2022	Outstanding Achievement in Cinematography, Pilot, Limited Series, or Motion Picture Made for Television	Guillermo del Toro's Cabinet of Curiosities	Nominated	
Canadian Screen Awards	2014	Best Photography in a Documentary Program or Series	We Were Children with Kim Bell	Won	
Canadian Screen Awards	2018	Best Direction in a Documentary or Factual Series	Extraordinary Canadians: "Douglas Coupland on Marshall McLuhan" with Kenneth Hirsch	Nominated	
Canadian Screen Awards	2026	Best Cinematography	40 Acres	Won	
Gemini Awards	2010	Best Photography in a Documentary Program or Series	Manson	Nominated	
Gemini Awards	2010	Best Photography in a Documentary Program or Series	The Great Sperm Race	Nominated	
