= Sally Davies (artist) =

Canadian artist

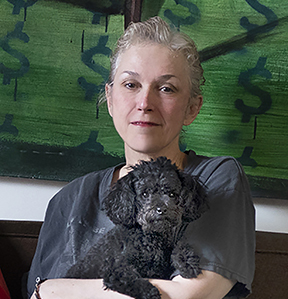
- Born: July 26, 1956 (age 70); Winnipeg, Manitoba, Canada
- Education: New York City Program, Ontario College of Art and Design
- Known for: Photographer, Painter
- Awards: New York City Council Citation, 2014
- Website: http://www.sallydaviesphoto.com

Sally Davies (born 1956 in Winnipeg, Manitoba, Canada) is a Canadian painter and photographer, living and working in New York City's East Village since 1983.

== Paintings ==
Davies made the "Lucky Paintings" and "Lucky Chairs" paintings in the 1990s, exhibiting at the OK Harris Gallery, and then at the Gracie Mansion Gallery. Following the Lucky Paintings were the "tattoo paintings", "product paintings", and the "furniture paintings".

== Photography ==
Davies simultaneously began to photograph the East Village in the 1980s alongside her painting career. In the mid-1990s, she had a fire in her loft on Avenue A and lost almost all her negatives to that date.

In 2000, Davies had her first solo photography exhibit at the Gracie Mansion Gallery in the East Village. The Alien Photos served as a visual bridge between her paintings and her photography. The final large-scale images consisted of dioramas that she constructed to house the 6-inch alien dolls in Barbie clothes in domestic situations.

=== Lower East Side and East Village ===
Davies has been photographing New York City's Lower East Side since 1983. She received a New York City Council Citation on February 6, 2014, from Rosie Mendez for her ongoing documenting of the Lower East Side, and the neighborhood's socio-economic changes.

Davies exhibited these photographs at the now-closed Bernarducci Meisel Gallery in New York City, in 2014 and 2015.

=== America ===
In 2016, Davies traveled to Los Angeles. She photographed Venice and Santa Monica and the surrounding neighborhoods. Since then, she has continued to photograph Texas, Florida, and rural America as well as Western Canada.

== New Yorkers ==
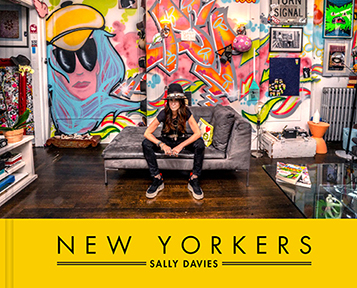
Book cover of New Yorkers, published by Ammonite Press

In 2021, Davies released a book of photographs entitled New Yorkers. New Yorkers presents 72 portraits of people in their apartments. A cast of drag queens, store owners, doctors, dog walkers, psychics, cab drivers, writers, artists, tattoo artists, gallery owners, photographers, designers, dancers, and musicians (including such legendary New Yorkers as Laurie Anderson, Danny Fields, and William Ivey Long) reveal the diversity, creativity, and humanity at the heart of New York City.

== McDonald's Happy Meal Project ==
After betting with a restaurateur friend that McDonald's food did not spoil, rot, or go mouldy, Sally Davies purchased a Happy Meal from McDonald's and began photographing the food item daily, storing it on her kitchen counter. This commenced the "McDonald's Happy Meal Project". The project began on April 10, 2010. The project demonstrated that the Happy Meal looked the same as it did when it was purchased months and years later. On August 19, 2018, the Happy Meal Project reached it 3051st day. It continues to be documented by Sally Davies.

== In the media ==
Her "Lucky Chairs" have been featured on The Oprah Winfrey Show and Sex and the City. Her photographs of the 9/11 attacks are included in the book A Democracy of Photos (Scalo Press, 2002).

Davies' portraits include: Debra Winger, featured on the cover of Winger's 2008 book undiscovere (Simon and Schuster, 2008); Elaine Kaufman in Everyone Comes to Elaine's (A. E. Hotchner, Harper Collins Publishers, NYC, 2004), and Canadian musician Jim Cuddy, for the cover of his album Skyscraper Soul (2011). Davies also shot the cover image on Cuddy's previous solo album, The Light That Guides You Home (2006), and art directed and photographed the cover image for his 2018 album Constellation.

== Collections ==
Her paintings and photographs are in the collections of Harvard Business School, Sarah Jessica Parker, Debra Winger, Michael Patrick King, Phil Scotti, Jane Holzer, Gary Lightbody of Snow Patrol and others. Davies' work is also in the permanent collection of The Museum of the City of New York.

== Bibliography ==
- New Yorkers, Ammonite Press, 2021 ISBN 1-781-45404-3
- Street Photography "The Woman Who Took Ginberg's Apartment" March 10, 2017
- Huffington Post "New York City Photographer Sally Davies Hits The Streets of Los Angeles" by Michael Ernest Sweet November 12, 2016
- Huffington Post "Photographer Sally Davies Discusses Women Street Photographers York City" by Michael Ernest Sweet December 15, 2015
- ISO 400, A Podcast by The Phoblographer "Sally Davies Talks About Photographing the East Village" November 6, 2015
- Women in Photography "Sally Davies New York City" November 30, 2015
- Huffington Post "New York City in Color: The Photography of Sally Davies" by Michael Ernest Sweet July 14, 2015
- The Artist's Forum Sally Davies New York At Night June 6, 2015
- PDN "Five Photos, No Words: Sally Davies" by David Carol November 11, 2003
- 100 Millimetri "Street Photography in New York: Sally Davies Interview" October 24, 2013
- Saatchi Online "SpotLight" East 4th Street Car by Sally Davies (photo only) December 2010
- Refinery 29 "Why We're Scared of Happy Meals" August 26, 2010.
- The Happy Meal Project by Sally Davies "Press and Photographs of the Happy Meal" August 19, 2018.
- A Democracy of Photos, Scalo Press Zurich, Berlin, New York, Sept 2002, pp. 710 - "Missing Brother" and pp. 711 - "I Will Not Be Terrorized".
- Loft, Mayer Rus and Paul Warchol, Monacelli Press, New York, 1998, p. 106.
- Tattoo Review Magazine, "Lucky Charm Art by Sally Davies", December 1997, pp. 17, 18, 19, 20.
- Hot Lava Magazine "Feature Artist Sally Davies " Sept. 1996, pp. 62, 63, 64.
- In Style Magazine, "Objects of Desire", June 1995, p. 40.
- Elvis + Marilyn: 2 x Immortal, Geri DePaolo and Wendy McDaris, Rizzoli International Publications, Inc., New York, 1994, p. 130.
- Parachute Magazine, "Sally Davies/Franc Palaia", Susan Douglas, July/August/September, 1994, pp. 50 – 51.
