= Countrywide Soul =

Studio album by Jim Cuddy
- Released: May 31, 2019
- Recorded: 2018
- Genre: Country rock
- Length: 53:32
- Label: 5 Corners Productions
- Producers: Jim Cuddy, Colin Cripps, Tim Vesely

Jim Cuddy chronology
Constellation (2018)	Countrywide Soul (2019)	All the World Fades Away (2024)

Countrywide Soul is the fifth studio album by Canadian singer-songwriter Jim Cuddy. It was released on May 31, 2019.

== Background ==
The album comprises new recordings of songs previously recorded by Cuddy and Blue Rodeo, in addition to two new tracks and two cover songs. The album was recorded live at Cuddy's farm in Southern Ontario after touring for 2018's Constellation.

== Track listing ==
All songs written by Jim Cuddy, except where noted.

1. "All in Time" – 5:00 - originally recorded on 1998's All in Time
2. "Countrywide Soul" – 4:36 - originally recorded on 2006's The Light That Guides You Home
3. "Clearer View" – 3:50 - originally recorded on Blue Rodeo's Palace of Gold (Greg Keelor, Jim Cuddy)
4. "Everybody Cries" – 3:45 - originally recorded on All in Time
5. "Dragging On" – 6:25 - originally recorded on Blue Rodeo's Tremolo (Keelor, Cuddy)
6. "The Light That Guides You Home" – 5:23 - originally recorded on The Light That Guides You Home
7. "Glorious Day" – 5:06 - new song
8. "Maybe Sometime" – 4:06 - originally recorded on The Light That Guides You Home
9. "Back Here Again" – 3:07 - new song
10. "Almost Persuaded" – 4:21 (Billy Sherrill, Glenn Sutton cover)
11. "Rhinestone Cowboy" – 3:20 (Larry Weiss cover)
12. "Wash Me Down" – 4:38 - originally recorded on 2011's Skyscraper Soul

== Charts ==
Chart (2018)	Peak position
Canadian Albums (Billboard)	56
