= Canadian Screen Award for Best Art Direction/Production Design =

Canadian film award

- Country: Canada
- Presented by: Academy of Canadian Cinema & Television
- First award: 1970
- Currently held by: Peter Cosco for 40 Acres (2025)
- Website: academy.ca/awards

The Canadian Screen Award for Best Achievement in Art Direction/Production Design is awarded by the Academy of Canadian Cinema and Television to the best Canadian film art direction/production design.

== 1970s ==
Year	Nominee	Film	Ref
1970; 22nd Canadian Film Awards
1970; 22nd Canadian Film Awards	Anne Pritchard	The Act of the Heart	
1971; 23rd Canadian Film Awards
1971; 23rd Canadian Film Awards	Aleksandr Kuznetsov	Tiki Tiki	
1972; 24th Canadian Film Awards
1972; 24th Canadian Film Awards	Karen Bromley	Wedding in White	
1973; 25th Canadian Film Awards
1973; 25th Canadian Film Awards	François Barbeau	Kamouraska	
1974
1974	No award presented		
1975; 26th Canadian Film Awards
1975; 26th Canadian Film Awards	François Barbeau	Eliza's Horoscope	
1976; 27th Canadian Film Awards
1976; 27th Canadian Film Awards	Anne Pritchard	The Far Shore	
1977; 28th Canadian Film Awards
1977; 28th Canadian Film Awards	Vianney Gauthier	J.A. Martin Photographer (J.A. Martin photographe)	
1978; 29th Canadian Film Awards
1978; 29th Canadian Film Awards	Wolf Kroeger	In Praise of Older Women	
1978; 29th Canadian Film Awards	Reuben Freed	Blood and Guts	
1978; 29th Canadian Film Awards	Tony Hall	Three Card Monte	
1978; 29th Canadian Film Awards	Trevor Williams	The Silent Partner	

== 1980s ==
Year	Nominee	Film	Ref
1980; 1st Genie Awards
1980; 1st Genie Awards	Trevor Williams	The Changeling	
1980; 1st Genie Awards	Denis Boucher, Vianney Gauthier	Cordélia	
1980; 1st Genie Awards	Seamus Flannery	Fish Hawk	
1980; 1st Genie Awards	Seamus Flannery	Jack London's Klondike Fever	
1980; 1st Genie Awards	Wolf Kroeger	It Rained All Night the Day I Left	
1980; 1st Genie Awards	Roy Forge Smith	Yesterday	
1980; 1st Genie Awards	Carol Spier	The Brood	
1981; 2nd Genie Awards
1981; 2nd Genie Awards	Anne Pritchard	Atlantic City, U.S.A.	
1981; 2nd Genie Awards	Glenn Bydwell	Terror Train	
1981; 2nd Genie Awards	Anne Pritchard, Jocelyn Joly	Fantastica	
1981; 2nd Genie Awards	Michel Proulx	Good Riddance (Les bons débarras)	
1981; 2nd Genie Awards	Normand Sarazin	The Handyman (L'Homme à tout faire)	
1982; 3rd Genie Awards
1982; 3rd Genie Awards	William McCrow	The Plouffe Family (Les Plouffe)	
1982; 3rd Genie Awards	Trevor Williams	The Amateur	
1982; 3rd Genie Awards	Ninkey Dalton, Charles Dunlop	Improper Channels	
1982; 3rd Genie Awards	Carol Spier	Scanners	
1982; 3rd Genie Awards	Bill Brodie	Silence of the North	
1982; 3rd Genie Awards	Claude Bonniere	Your Ticket Is No Longer Valid	
1983; 4th Genie Awards
1983; 4th Genie Awards	Bill Brodie	The Grey Fox	
1983; 4th Genie Awards	Richard Hudolin	Latitude 55°	
1983; 4th Genie Awards	Anne Pritchard	Threshold	
1984; 5th Genie Awards
1984; 5th Genie Awards	Jocelyn Joly	Maria Chapdelaine	
1984; 5th Genie Awards	Gilles Aird	Lucien Brouillard	
1984; 5th Genie Awards	Glenn Bydwell	Ups and Downs	
1984; 5th Genie Awards	Carol Spier	Videodrome	
1985; 6th Genie Awards
1985; 6th Genie Awards	Wolf Kroeger	The Bay Boy	
1985; 6th Genie Awards	Denis Boucher	Mario	
1985; 6th Genie Awards	Bill Brodie	Draw!	
1985; 6th Genie Awards	Vianney Gauthier	The Years of Dreams and Revolt (Les Années de rêves)	
1985; 6th Genie Awards	Jocelyn Joly	The Crime of Ovide Plouffe (Le Crime d'Ovide Plouffe)	
1986; 7th Genie Awards
1986; 7th Genie Awards	Anne Pritchard	Joshua Then and Now	
1986; 7th Genie Awards	William Beeton	The Boy in Blue	
1986; 7th Genie Awards	Bill Brodie	One Magic Christmas	
1986; 7th Genie Awards	Phil Schmidt	My American Cousin	
1986; 7th Genie Awards	François Séguin	Night Magic	
1987; 8th Genie Awards
1987; 8th Genie Awards	Lillian Sarafinchan	Dancing in the Dark	
1987; 8th Genie Awards	François Séguin	Exit	
1987; 8th Genie Awards	Michel Proulx	In the Shadow of the Wind (Les Fous de Bassan)	
1987; 8th Genie Awards	Michel Proulx	Intimate Power (Pouvoir intime)	
1988; 9th Genie Awards
1988; 9th Genie Awards	Jean-Baptiste Tard	Night Zoo (Un zoo la nuit)	
1988; 9th Genie Awards	Ronald Fauteux	Brother André (Le Frère André)	
1988; 9th Genie Awards	Violette Daneau	The Great Land of Small	
1988; 9th Genie Awards	François Séguin	Marie in the City (Marie s'en va-t-en ville)	
1989; 10th Genie Awards
1989; 10th Genie Awards	Carol Spier	Dead Ringers	
1989; 10th Genie Awards	Anne Pritchard	The Revolving Doors (Les Portes tournantes)	
1989; 10th Genie Awards	Vianney Gauthier	Straight for the Heart (À corps perdu)	

== 1990s ==
Year	Nominee	Film	Ref
1990; 11th Genie Awards
1990; 11th Genie Awards	François Séguin	Jesus of Montreal (Jésus de Montréal)	
1990; 11th Genie Awards	John Blackie	Bye Bye Blues	
1990; 11th Genie Awards	Reuben Freed	Palais Royale	
1991; 12th Genie Awards
1991; 12th Genie Awards	Gavin Mitchell, Herbert Pinter	Black Robe	
1991; 12th Genie Awards	Seamus Flannery	Beautiful Dreamers	
1991; 12th Genie Awards	Anne Pritchard	Perfectly Normal	
1991; 12th Genie Awards	Michel Proulx, Enrique Alarcón, Ren Huixing, Ronald Fauteux	Bethune: The Making of a Hero	
1991; 12th Genie Awards	Phil Schmidt	Chaindance	
1992; 13th Genie Awards
1992; 13th Genie Awards	Carol Spier	Naked Lunch	
1992; 13th Genie Awards	Andris Hausmanis	True Confections	
1992; 13th Genie Awards	Louise Jobin	Phantom Life (La Vie fantôme)	
1992; 13th Genie Awards	François Séguin	Being at Home with Claude	
1992; 13th Genie Awards	François Séguin	Léolo	
1992; 13th Genie Awards	François Séguin	The Saracen Woman (La Sarrasine)	
1993; 14th Genie Awards
1993; 14th Genie Awards	Wolf Kroeger	Shadow of the Wolf	
1993; 14th Genie Awards	Mark S. Freeborn	Digger	
1993; 14th Genie Awards	David Roberts	The Lotus Eaters	
1993; 14th Genie Awards	Lynne Stopkewich	Harmony Cats	
1993; 14th Genie Awards	Curtis Wehrfritz	Tectonic Plates	
1994; 15th Genie Awards
1994; 15th Genie Awards	Richard Paris, Linda Del Rosario	Exotica	
1994; 15th Genie Awards	Luc J. Béland	Jerome's Secret (Le secret de Jérôme)	
1994; 15th Genie Awards	Serge Bureau	Desire in Motion (Mouvements du désir)	
1994; 15th Genie Awards	Marie-Carole de Beaumont	Les pots cassés	
1994; 15th Genie Awards	Vianney Gauthier	Matusalem	
1995; 16th Genie Awards
1995; 16th Genie Awards	François Laplante	The Confessional (Le Confessionnal)	
1995; 16th Genie Awards	André Guimond	Eldorado	
1995; 16th Genie Awards	Nilo Romis Jamero	Johnny Mnemonic	
1995; 16th Genie Awards	Clyde Klotz, Michael O'Connor	Magic in the Water	
1995; 16th Genie Awards	David McHenry, William Fleming	Margaret's Museum	
1996; 17th Genie Awards
1996; 17th Genie Awards	Sandra Kybartas	Lilies	
1996; 17th Genie Awards	John Dondertman	Swann	
1996; 17th Genie Awards	Perri Gorrara	Screamers	
1996; 17th Genie Awards	Paola Ridolfi	Never Too Late	
1996; 17th Genie Awards	Taavo Soodor	The Boys Club	
1997; 18th Genie Awards
1997; 18th Genie Awards	Normand Sarazin	Karmina	
1997; 18th Genie Awards	Phillip Barker, Patricia Cuccia, Kathleen Climie	The Sweet Hereafter	
1997; 18th Genie Awards	Serge Bureau	Night of the Flood (La nuit du déluge)	
1997; 18th Genie Awards	Claude Paré	The Countess of Baton Rouge (La Comtesse de Baton Rouge)	
1997; 18th Genie Awards	Taavo Soodor, Charlotte Harper, Darlene Shiels	The Hanging Garden	
1998; 19th Genie Awards
1998; 19th Genie Awards	François Séguin	The Red Violin	
1998; 19th Genie Awards	Jasna Stefanovic	Cube	
1998; 19th Genie Awards	John Dondertman, Patricia Cuccia	Last Night	
1998; 19th Genie Awards	Andy Harris	Regeneration	
1998; 19th Genie Awards	Nitin Chandrakant Desai	Such a Long Journey	
1999; 20th Genie Awards
1999; 20th Genie Awards	François Séguin	Memories Unlocked (Souvenirs intimes)	
1999; 20th Genie Awards	Patricia Cuccia, John Dondertman	Boy Meets Girl	
1999; 20th Genie Awards	Carol Spier, Elinor Rose Galbraith	eXistenZ	
1999; 20th Genie Awards	Darryl Dennis Deegan, Erica Milo, Taavo Soodor	The Five Senses	
1999; 20th Genie Awards	Atilla F. Kovacs	Sunshine	

== 2000s ==
Year	Nominee	Film	Ref
2000; 21st Genie Awards
2000; 21st Genie Awards	François Séguin, Danièle Rouleau	Possible Worlds	
2000; 21st Genie Awards	Sylvain Gingras	Maelström	
2000; 21st Genie Awards	Emmanuel Jannasch, Norma-Jean Sanders	New Waterford Girl	
2000; 21st Genie Awards	Jean Morin, Zoë Sakellaropoulo	Stardom	
2000; 21st Genie Awards	Ginette Robitaille, Anne Pritchard	The Art of War	
2001; 22nd Genie Awards
2001; 22nd Genie Awards	Ken Rempel	The War Bride	
2001; 22nd Genie Awards	Bill Fleming, Shelly Nieder	Deeply	
2001; 22nd Genie Awards	André-Line Beauparlant	The Woman Who Drinks (La Femme qui boit)	
2001; 22nd Genie Awards	Tony Devenyi	Last Wedding	
2001; 22nd Genie Awards	Ken Rempel	The Claim	
2002; 23rd Genie Awards
2002; 23rd Genie Awards	François Séguin	Almost America	
2002; 23rd Genie Awards	Phillip Barker	Ararat	
2002; 23rd Genie Awards	André-Line Beauparlant	The Negro (Le nèg')	
2002; 23rd Genie Awards	Arvinder Grewal, Andrew Sanders	Spider	
2002; 23rd Genie Awards	Paryse Normandeau	Turning Paige	
2003; 24th Genie Awards
2003; 24th Genie Awards	Rob Gray, Christina Kuhnigk	Falling Angels	
2003; 24th Genie Awards	Normand Sarazin	Seducing Doctor Lewis (La Grande séduction)	
2003; 24th Genie Awards	Christian Legaré	Saved by the Belles	
2003; 24th Genie Awards	Ronald Fauteux, Jean Bécotte	Séraphin: Heart of Stone (Séraphin: un homme et son péché)	
2003; 24th Genie Awards	Cal Loucks, Don Taylor	The Gospel of John	
2004; 25th Genie Awards
2004; 25th Genie Awards	Jean-Baptiste Tard	Nouvelle-France	
2004; 25th Genie Awards	André-Line Beauparlant	Happy Camper (Camping sauvage)	
2004; 25th Genie Awards	Jonathan Lee, Gilles Aird	Head in the Clouds	
2004; 25th Genie Awards	Jean Bécotte	The Last Tunnel (Le Dernier tunnel)	
2004; 25th Genie Awards	Michel Proulx	Machine Gun Molly (Monica la mitraille)	
2005; 26th Genie Awards
2005; 26th Genie Awards	Patrice Vermette	C.R.A.Z.Y.	
2005; 26th Genie Awards	Michel Proulx	Aurore	
2005; 26th Genie Awards	Deanne Rohde, Shawna Balas, Ricardo Alms	Seven Times Lucky	
2005; 26th Genie Awards	Dilip Mehta	Water	
2005; 26th Genie Awards	Phillip Barker, Cal Loucks	Where the Truth Lies	
2006; 27th Genie Awards
2006; 27th Genie Awards	Michel Proulx	The Rocket (Maurice Richard)	
2006; 27th Genie Awards	Jean Bécotte	Bon Cop, Bad Cop	
2006; 27th Genie Awards	Mary-Ann Liu, Athena Wong	Eve and the Fire Horse	
2006; 27th Genie Awards	François Séguin	Angel's Rage (La Rage de l'ange)	
2006; 27th Genie Awards	Jasna Stefanovic	Tideland	
2007; 28th Genie Awards
2007; 28th Genie Awards	Rob Gray, James Willcock	Fido	
2007; 28th Genie Awards	André-Line Beauparlant	Continental, a Film Without Guns (Continental, un film sans fusil)	
2007; 28th Genie Awards	Carol Spier	Eastern Promises	
2007; 28th Genie Awards	Lindsey Hermer-Bell, Justin Craig	Shake Hands With the Devil	
2007; 28th Genie Awards	François Séguin	Silk	
2008; 29th Genie Awards
2008; 29th Genie Awards	Carol Spier, Janice Blackie-Goodine	Passchendaele	
2008; 29th Genie Awards	Patrice Bengle	Mommy Is at the Hairdresser's (Maman est chez le coiffeur)	
2008; 29th Genie Awards	Matthew Davies, Erica Milo	Fugitive Pieces	
2008; 29th Genie Awards	Rob Gray	The Stone Angel	
2008; 29th Genie Awards	Danielle Labrie	The American Trap (Le Piège américain)	
2009; 30th Genie Awards
2009; 30th Genie Awards	Eve Stewart	Fifty Dead Men Walking	
2009; 30th Genie Awards	Diana Abbatangelo	Nurse.Fighter.Boy	
2009; 30th Genie Awards	Susan Avingaq	Before Tomorrow (Le Jour avant le lendemain)	
2009; 30th Genie Awards	Jean Babin	The Master Key (Grande Ourse: La Clé des possibles)	
2009; 30th Genie Awards	Patrice Vermette	1981	

== 2010s ==
Year	Nominee	Film	Ref
2010; 31st Genie Awards
2010; 31st Genie Awards	Claude Paré, Élise de Blois	Barney's Version	
2010; 31st Genie Awards	Gilles Aird	10½	
2010; 31st Genie Awards	André-Line Beauparlant	Incendies	
2010; 31st Genie Awards	Arvinder Grewal	Resident Evil: Afterlife	
2010; 31st Genie Awards	Myron Hyrak	FUBAR 2	
2011; 32nd Genie Awards
2011; 32nd Genie Awards	James McAteer	A Dangerous Method	
2011; 32nd Genie Awards	Jean Bécotte	Funkytown	
2011; 32nd Genie Awards	Aidan Leroux, Rob Hepburn	Citizen Gangster	
2011; 32nd Genie Awards	Patrice Vermette	Café de Flore	
2011; 32nd Genie Awards	Emelia Weavind	The Bang Bang Club	
2012; 1st Canadian Screen Awards
2012; 1st Canadian Screen Awards	Emmanuel Fréchette, Josée Arsenault	War Witch (Rebelle)	
2012; 1st Canadian Screen Awards	Arvinder Grewal	Antiviral	
2012; 1st Canadian Screen Awards	André Guimond	L'Affaire Dumont	
2012; 1st Canadian Screen Awards	Dilip Mehta	Midnight's Children	
2012; 1st Canadian Screen Awards	Anne Pritchard	Laurence Anyways	
2013; 2nd Canadian Screen Awards
2013; 2nd Canadian Screen Awards	Michel Proulx	Louis Cyr	
2013; 2nd Canadian Screen Awards	Jean Bécotte	Maïna	
2013; 2nd Canadian Screen Awards	Mario Hervieux	The Dismantling (Le Démantèlement)	
2013; 2nd Canadian Screen Awards	Anthony Ianni, François Séguin	The Mortal Instruments: City of Bones	
2013; 2nd Canadian Screen Awards	Patrice Vermette	Enemy	
2014; 3rd Canadian Screen Awards
2014; 3rd Canadian Screen Awards	Paul Denham Austerberry, Nigel Churcher	Pompeii	
2014; 3rd Canadian Screen Awards	Phillip Barker	The Captive	
2014; 3rd Canadian Screen Awards	Xavier Georges	Cast No Shadow	
2014; 3rd Canadian Screen Awards	William Layton	Fall	
2014; 3rd Canadian Screen Awards	Colombe Raby	Mommy	
2015; 4th Canadian Screen Awards
2015; 4th Canadian Screen Awards	Ethan Tobman, Mary Kirkland	Room	
2015; 4th Canadian Screen Awards	Arvinder Grewal, Steve Shewchuk, Larry Spittle	Hyena Road	
2015; 4th Canadian Screen Awards	Galen Johnson, Brigitte Henry, Chris Lavis, Maciek Szczerbowski	The Forbidden Room	
2015; 4th Canadian Screen Awards	Ken Rempel, Kathy McCoy, Erik Gerlund	Forsaken	
2015; 4th Canadian Screen Awards	Louisa Schabas	Felix and Meira (Félix et Meira)	
2016; 5th Canadian Screen Awards
2016; 5th Canadian Screen Awards	Emmanuel Fréchette	Two Lovers and a Bear	
2016; 5th Canadian Screen Awards	André-Line Beauparlant	Bad Seeds (Les mauvaises herbes)	
2016; 5th Canadian Screen Awards	David Brisbin, Isabelle Guay, Jean-Pierre Paquet	Race	
2016; 5th Canadian Screen Awards	Aidan Leroux, Joel Richardson	Born to Be Blue	
2016; 5th Canadian Screen Awards	Matt Likely	Weirdos	
2017; 6th Canadian Screen Awards
2017; 6th Canadian Screen Awards	François Séguin	Hochelaga, Land of Souls (Hochelaga terre des âmes)	
2017; 6th Canadian Screen Awards	Guillaume Couture	Cross My Heart (Les Rois mongols)	
2017; 6th Canadian Screen Awards	Sophie Jarvis, Liz Cairns	Never Steady, Never Still	
2017; 6th Canadian Screen Awards	Siamak Karinejad	Ava	
2017; 6th Canadian Screen Awards	Marjorie Rhéaume	The Little Girl Who Was Too Fond of Matches (La petite fille qui aimait trop les allumettes)	
2018; 7th Canadian Screen Awards
2018; 7th Canadian Screen Awards	Patricia McNeil and Sylvain Dion	The Great Darkened Days (La grande noirceur)	
2018; 7th Canadian Screen Awards	Emmanuel Fréchette	The Hummingbird Project	
2018; 7th Canadian Screen Awards	Marie-Claude Gosselin	For Those Who Don't Read Me (À tous ceux qui ne me lisent pas)	
2018; 7th Canadian Screen Awards	Iñigo Navarro	The Padre	
2018; 7th Canadian Screen Awards	Elisa Sauve	Octavio Is Dead!	
2019; 8th Canadian Screen Awards
2019; 8th Canadian Screen Awards	Dany Boivin	The Twentieth Century	
2019; 8th Canadian Screen Awards	Chris Crane	Run This Town	
2019; 8th Canadian Screen Awards	Jennifer Morden, Danny Haeberlin	Riot Girls	
2019; 8th Canadian Screen Awards	François Séguin, Pierre Perrault	The Song of Names	
2019; 8th Canadian Screen Awards	Marian Wihak, Svjetlana Jaklenec	Stand!	

== 2020s ==
Year	Nominee	Film	Ref
2020; 9th Canadian Screen Awards
2020; 9th Canadian Screen Awards	Louisa Schabas, Sylvain Lemaitre	Blood Quantum	
2020; 9th Canadian Screen Awards	Phillip Barker	Guest of Honour	
2020; 9th Canadian Screen Awards	André-Line Beauparlant	Goddess of the Fireflies (La déesse des mouches à feu)	
2020; 9th Canadian Screen Awards	Jennifer Morden, Matthew Bianchi	The Kid Detective	
2020; 9th Canadian Screen Awards	Carol Spier	Falling	
2021; 10th Canadian Screen Awards
2021; 10th Canadian Screen Awards	Arnaud Brisebois, Jean Babin, Ève Turcotte	The Time Thief (L'arracheuse de temps)	
2021; 10th Canadian Screen Awards	Jean Babin	Maria Chapdelaine	
2021; 10th Canadian Screen Awards	André-Line Beauparlant	Drunken Birds (Les oiseaux ivres)	
2021; 10th Canadian Screen Awards	Nigel Churcher	The Exchange	
2021; 10th Canadian Screen Awards	Danny Haeberlin	All My Puny Sorrows	
2022; 11th Canadian Screen Awards
2022; 11th Canadian Screen Awards	Jason Clarke, John Kim, Richard Racicot	Brother	
2022; 11th Canadian Screen Awards	André-Line Beauparlant	Viking	
2022; 11th Canadian Screen Awards	Jennifer Morden	Alice, Darling	
2022; 11th Canadian Screen Awards	Dan Herrick, Zoë Woodrow	Cult Hero	
2022; 11th Canadian Screen Awards	Carol Spier	Crimes of the Future	
2023; 12th Canadian Screen Awards
2023; 12th Canadian Screen Awards	Adam Belanger, Kerry Noonan, Lucy Larkin	BlackBerry	
2023; 12th Canadian Screen Awards	Ludovic Dufresne	Humanist Vampire Seeking Consenting Suicidal Person (Vampire humaniste cherche suicidaire consentant)	
2023; 12th Canadian Screen Awards	Thea Hollatz	Fitting In	
2023; 12th Canadian Screen Awards	Marie-Hélène Lavoie	Ru	
2023; 12th Canadian Screen Awards	Michael Pierson	The Queen of My Dreams	
2024; 13th Canadian Screen Awards
2024; 13th Canadian Screen Awards	Louisa Schabas	Universal Language (Une langue universelle)	
2024; 13th Canadian Screen Awards	Phillip Barker, Adriana Bogaard, Mark McGann	Seven Veils	
2024; 13th Canadian Screen Awards	Brian Garvey, Andrea Perez Leon, David Edgar	Humane	
2024; 13th Canadian Screen Awards	Zosia Mackenzie, John O'Regan, Márton Vörös, Rita Hetényi	Rumours	
2024; 13th Canadian Screen Awards	Carol Spier	The Shrouds	
2025; 14th Canadian Screen Awards
2025; 14th Canadian Screen Awards	Peter Cosco	40 Acres	
2025; 14th Canadian Screen Awards	Kerry Noonan, Malcolm McKenzie	Nirvanna the Band the Show the Movie	
2025; 14th Canadian Screen Awards	Antonin Sorel	The Train (Le Train)	
2025; 14th Canadian Screen Awards	Joshua Turpin	Honey Bunch	
2025; 14th Canadian Screen Awards	Joshua Turpin, Chloé Olson	Deathstalker	

== See also ==
- Prix Iris for Best Art Direction
