= Perfectly normal =

Perfectly normal may refer to:

- Perfectly Normal, a 1990 Canadian comedy film directed by Yves Simoneau
- Perfectly normal space, a type of topological space
