= François Séguin =

Canadian art director

François Séguin is a Canadian production designer, art director and set decorator.

== Recognition ==
- 1986 Genie Award for Best Achievement in Art Direction - Night Magic - Nominated
- 1987 Genie Award for Best Achievement in Art Direction/Production Design - Exit - Nominated
- 1988 Genie Award for Best Achievement in Art Direction/Production Design - Marie in the City (Marie s'en va-t-en ville) - Nominated
- 1990 Genie Award for Best Achievement in Art Direction/Production Design - Jesus of Montreal - Won
- 1992 Genie Award for Best Achievement in Art Direction/Production Design - Being at Home with Claude - Nominated
- 1992 Genie Award for Best Achievement in Art Direction/Production Design - Léolo - Nominated
- 1992 Genie Award for Best Achievement in Art Direction/Production Design - The Saracen Woman (La Sarrasine) - Nominated
- 1996 Gemini Award for Best Production Design or Art Direction - Million Dollar Babies - Nominated
- 1999 Jutra Award for Best Art Direction - Le Violon rouge - Won (shared with Renée April)
- 1999 Genie Award for Best Achievement in Art Direction/Production Design -The Red Violin (Le Violon rouge) - Won
- 2000 Genie Award for Best Achievement in Art Direction/Production Design - Memories Unlocked (Souvenirs intimes) - Won
- 2001 Genie Award for Best Achievement in Art Direction/Production Design - Possible Worlds - Won (shared with Daniéle Rouleau)
- 2003 Genie Award for Best Achievement in Art Direction/Production Design - Come l'America - Won
- 2004 Directors Guild of Canada DGC Team Award - The Barbarian Invasions - Won (shared with Denys Arcand, Hélène Grimard, Caroline Alder, Christian Fluet)
- 2004 Directors Guild of Canada DGA Craft Award for Outstanding Achievement in Production Design - Feature Film - The Barbarian Invasions - Nominated
- 2007 Genie Award for Best Achievement in Art Direction/Production Design - Angel's Rage (La Rage de l'ange) - Nominee
