= All in Time =

All in Time may refer to:

- All in Time (album), an album by Jim Cuddy
- All in Time (film), a 2015 romantic comedy film
