= Jennifer Morden =

Canadian film and television production designer

Jennifer Morden is a Canadian film and television production designer. She is most noted as a two-time Canadian Screen Award nominee for Best Art Direction or Production Design, receiving nods at the 8th Canadian Screen Awards in 2019 alongside Danny Haeberlin for Riot Girls and at the 9th Canadian Screen Awards in 2021 alongside Matthew Bianchi for The Kid Detective.

Her other credits have included the films Pyotr495, Seven in Heaven and Flashback.
