= Carol Spier =

Canadian production designer and art director

Carol Spier is a Canadian production designer and art director. Much of her work has been on David Cronenberg films.

== Recognition ==
- 1980 Genie Award for Best Achievement in Art Direction/Production Design - The Brood - Nominated
- 1982 Genie Award for Best Achievement in Art Direction - Scanners - Nominated
- 1984 Genie Award for Best Achievement in Art Direction - Videodrome - Nominated
- 1986 Gemini Award for Best Production Design or Art Direction - Anne of Green Gables - Won
- 1989 Genie Award for Best Achievement in Art Direction/Production Design - Dead Ringers - Won
- 1992 Genie Award for Best Achievement in Art Direction/Production Design - Naked Lunch - Won
- 2000 Genie Award for Best Achievement in Art Direction/Production Design - eXistenZ - Won (shared with Elinor Rose Galbraith)
- 2006 DGC Craft Award for Outstanding Production Design - Feature Film - A History of Violence - Nominated
- 2007 Genie Award for Best Achievement in Art Direction/Production Design - Eastern Promises - Nominee
- 2015 DGC Craft Award for Outstanding Production Design - Feature Film - Maps to the Stars - Pending
