= Jean-François Pichette =

Jean-François Pichette is a Québécois actor.

== Filmography ==
- Straight for the Heart (À corps perdu) (1988), as Quentin
- An Imaginary Tale (Une histoire inventée) (1990), as Tibo
- Montréal P.Q. (1992) (TV series), as Mike Belzile
- Being at Home with Claude (1992), as Claude
- Chili's Blues (C'était le 12 du 12 et Chili avait les blues) (1994), as Père de Chili
- Desire in Motion (Mouvements du désir) (1994), as Vincent
- Virginie (1996) (TV series), as Daniel Charron (1996-1999)
- Le Chapeau ou L'histoire d'un malentendu (2000)
- Chartrand et Simonne (2000) (TV series), as Jean Marchand
- Fortier (2001) (TV series), as Claude Mayrand
- Les Poupées russes (2002) (TV series), as Jean-Louis Gagnon
- Secret de banlieue (2002), as David
- Un homme mort (2006) (TV series), as Emmanuel Dunston
- Nos Étés (2006) (TV series), as John Desrochers
- Trauma (2010–present) (TV series), as Dr. Mathieu Darveau
- Nouvelle adresse (2014–present)
- Thanks for Everything (Merci pour tout) - 2019
- Portrait-Robot (2021), as Patrick Lacenaire

== See also ==
- List of Quebec actors
