= Jason Clarke (designer) =

Canadian art designer involved in film

Jason Clarke is a Canadian film and television production designer and art director.

He won the Canadian Screen Award for Best Art Direction/Production Design in a Fiction Program or Series at the 4th Canadian Screen Awards in 2016 for The Book of Negroes, and the award for Best Art Direction/Production Design in a Film at the 11th Canadian Screen Awards in 2023 for Brother (with John Kim and Richard Racicot).
