= Jayli Wolf =

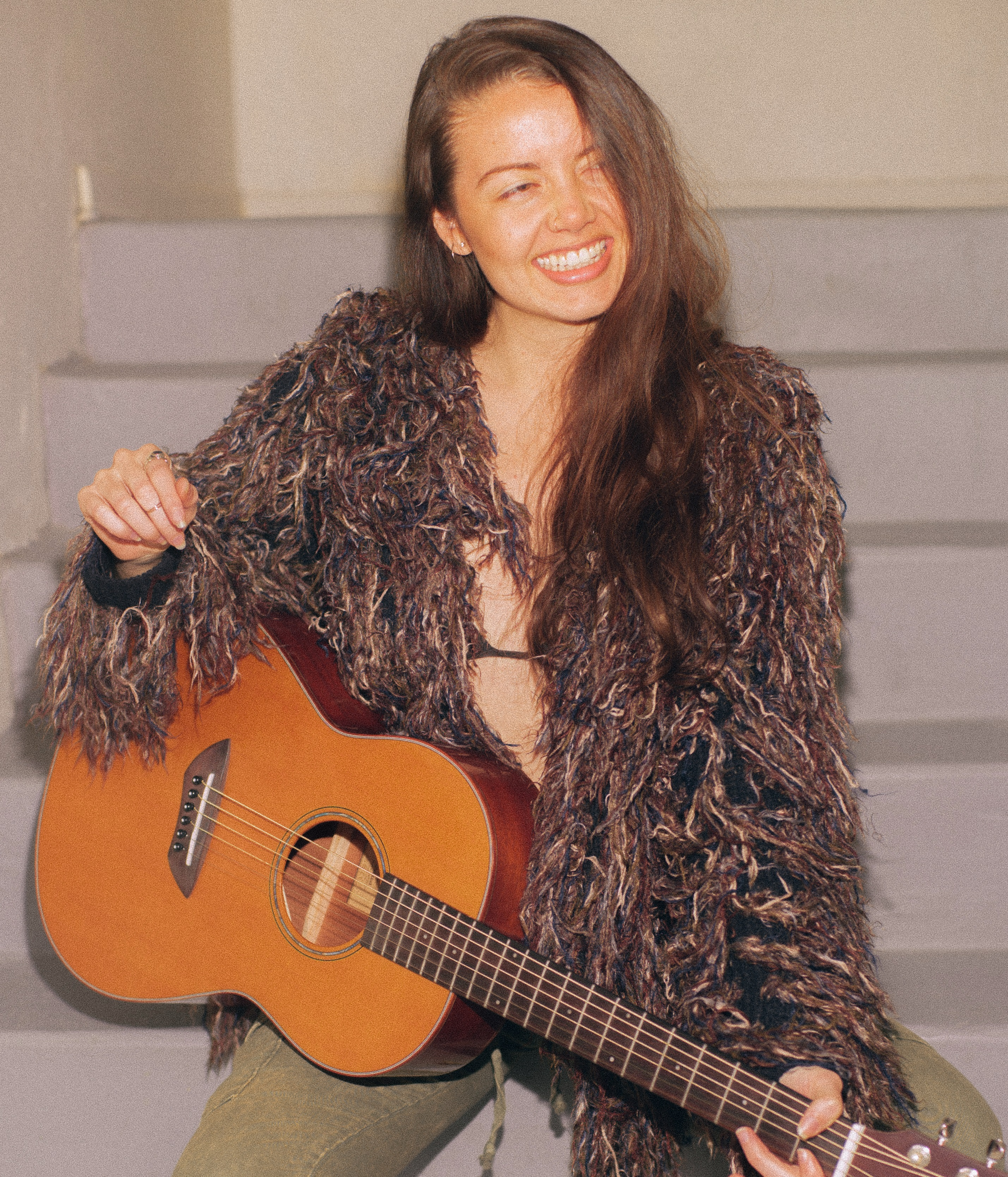
- Wolf in 2019

Background information
- Born: 23 November; Creston, British Columbia, Canada
- Genres: Indie pop; dark folk
- Instruments: Vocals; guitar
- Years active: 2013–present
- Member of: Once A Tree

Jayli Wolf (born 23 November) is a Canadian singer-songwriter, actress, and filmmaker. She began her music career in collaboration with Hayden Wolf under the name Once A Tree. As a solo artist, she broke out with her single and music video "Child of the Government", which made CBC Music's top 10 Canadian songs of 2021 and won Best Music Video at the Venice Short Film Awards.

For her debut solo EP Wild Whisper, Wolf was nominated for Contemporary Indigenous Artist of the Year at the Juno Awards of 2022. She was nominated for Best Supporting Actress at the American Indian Film Festival for her performance in the film Run Woman Run (2021).

== Early and personal life ==
Wolf was born in Creston, British Columbia to a teen mother of Danish descent and raised in a trailer with her maternal family. She was told she was half-Mexican growing up, only to learn she was First Nations at the age of eight. Her father reached out to her with the discovery that he was unwittingly taken in the Sixties Scoop and had his ethnicity covered up on his adoption papers. He found his family in the Saulteau First Nation near Chetwynd.

Wolf is bisexual. She grew up a Jehovah's Witness in what she has described as a Doomsday cult. She convinced her collaborator Hayden Wolf, whom she met online through mutual friends, to join her in leaving the religion. They married in 2012 and moved to Toronto together when Jayli won a songwriting contest. She dropped out of university to pursue a career in music. She has reconnected with her paternal family and indigenous heritage as an adult.

== Discography ==
=== EPs ===
Title	Details
Wild Whisper	Released: 2021 Label: Studio 71
God Is an Endless Mirror	Released: 2023 Label:

=== Singles ===
Year	Title	Album
2013	"I Can't Remember"	—N/a
2021	"Child of the Government"	Wild Whisper
2021	"Hush"	Wild Whisper
2021	"Lead Me"	—N/a
2023	"Holding On"	
2023	"Blood Orange"	

=== Music videos ===
Year	Title	Album
2021	"Child of the Government"	Wild Whisper
2021	"Hush"	Wild Whisper
2021	"Would You Die"	Wild Whisper
2021	"Hell"	Wild Whisper
2021	"Lead Me"	—N/a

== Filmography ==
=== Film ===
Year	Title	Role	Notes
2014	Being	Angel	Short film
2017	Ways to Water	Girl	Short film
2018	Level 16		
2021	Run Woman Run	Jess	
2021	The Exchange	Brenda	

=== Television ===
Year	Title	Role	Notes
2014–2016	Mohawk Girls	Tulip	Recurring role; 8 episodes
2015	Single Ladies	Flight Attendant	Episode: "Gone"
2016	Urban Native Girl		2 episodes
2018	rising	Herself	Documentary
2019	Burden of Truth	Ashley	3 episodes
2020	Tribal	Susan	Episode: "The Road to Hell is Paved"
2020	Trickster	Destiny	1 episode
2021	Y: The Last Man	Laura / Athena	5 episodes
2023	Spirit Rangers	Hedgehog	Voice; Episode: "River Ruckus/Sailing Stones"

== Awards and nominations ==
Year	Award	Category	Work	Result	Ref
2021	Venice Shorts Film Awards	Best Music Video	"Child of the Government"	Won	
2021	American Indian Film Festival	Best Supporting Actress	Run Woman Run	Nominated	
2022	Juno Awards	Contemporary Indigenous Artist of the Year	Wild Whisper	Nominated	
