= Eugene Lipinski =

British-Canadian actor (born 1956)

- Born: 5 November 1956 (age 69); Wansford Camp, Soke of Peterborough, England
- Occupations: Actor and screenwriter
- Years active: 1978–present

Eugene Lipinski (born 5 November 1956) is a British-Canadian character actor and screenwriter. He was born in Wansford Camp, Soke of Peterborough, England, and raised in Regina, Saskatchewan, Canada. He began acting at the age of twelve in amateur theatre. After graduating from the University of Regina, he returned to the UK and attended the Royal Academy of Arts as well as the Drama Studio London.

He is well known for his appearances in TV series such as Animorphs as Visser Three, Fringe as December, The Adventures of Sherlock Holmes (″The Dancing Men″) as Abe Slaney, and Da Vinci's City Hall and Da Vinci's Inquest as Lloyd Manning.

As a screenwriter, in 1991, he won the Genie Award for Best Screenplay for the film Perfectly Normal.

== Filmography ==
Film:

- Hanover Street (1979) - 1st German Clerk
- Yanks (1979) - Irish Barman
- Bad Timing (1980) - Hospital Policeman
- Superman II (1980) - Newsvendor
- Outland (1981) - Cane
- Shock Treatment (1981) - Kirk
- Moonlighting (1982) - Banaszak
- Firefox (1982) - KGB Agent #1
- Sophie's Choice (1982) - Polish Professor
- Octopussy (1983) - Head VOPO (uncredited)
- Gulag (1985) - Yuri
- The American Way (1986) - Ace
- Superman IV: The Quest for Peace (1987) - Cosmonaut Space Walker
- Leviathan (1989) - Russian Ship Captain
- Indiana Jones and the Last Crusade (1989) - G-Man
- Perfectly Normal (1991, also screenplay) - Hopeless
- Boozecan (1994) - Braston
- Strange and Rich (1994)
- Never Talk to Strangers (1995) - Dudakoff
- Harriet the Spy (1996) - George Waldenstein
- Affliction (1997) - Atty. J. Battle Hand
- Conquest (1998) - Glenn Boychuk
- Water Damage (1999) - David King
- Bless the Child (2000) - Stuart
- Borderline Normal (2001) - Mr. Dickens
- Solitude (2001) - Father Gregory
- Century Hotel (2001) - George
- Who Is Cletis Tout? (2001) - Falco
- Maximum Capacity (2001) - Eli
- Rollerball (2002) - Yuri Kotlev
- The Recruit (2003) - Husky Man
- Irish Eyes (2004) - Angelo Zagliardi
- The Lost Angel (2005) - Detective Zilinski
- Bailey's Billion$ (2005) - Leo
- Year of the Carnivore (2009) - Lloyd Zaslavsky
- Fringe (2009-2013) - December
- Monbella and the Curse of 1809 (2009) - Alexader Anderson
- The Art of the Steal (2013) - Bartkowiak
- Warcraft (2016) - Finden
- The Unseen (2016) - Milton
- Siberia - Polozin
- The Informer - Klimek

Television:

- Tinker Tailor Soldier Spy (1979, miniseries) - Czech Guard
- The Adventures of Sherlock Holmes (1984) - Abe Slaney
- Screen Two (1987–91) - Juliusz Janowski / Maj. Bannerman
- Love and Hate: The Story of Colin and JoAnn Thatcher (1989) - Garry Anderson
- The Diary of Evelyn Lau (1994, TV movie) - Joe
- Highlander: The Series (1995) - Brother Paul
- Goosebumps (1995–97) - Rocky (voice) / Mr. Mortman
- Animorphs (1998–99) - Visser Three / Victor Trent
- A Glimpse of Hell (2001, TV movie) - Skelley
- Da Vinci's City Hall (2005–06) - Lloyd Manning
- Canada Russia '72 (2006, TV movie) - Anatoly Tarasov
- Intelligence (2006–07) - Martin Kiniski
- The Quality of Life (2008, TV movie) - Lloyd Manning
- Alice (2008, miniseries) - Doctors Dee and Dum
- The Kennedys (2011, miniseries) - Nikita Khrushchev
- Arrow (2012–13) - Alexei Leonov
- The Romeo Section (2015–16) - Al Crenshaw
