= Lea Carlson =

Canadian costume designer

Lea Carlson is a Canadian costume designer in film and television. She is most noted as a three-time Canadian Screen Award nominee for Best Costume Design, receiving nominations at the 2nd Canadian Screen Awards in 2014 for The Colony, at the 7th Canadian Screen Awards in 2019 for Stockholm, and at the 10th Canadian Screen Awards in 2022 for The Exchange.

She also previously received three Gemini Award nominations for her television work, receiving nods at the 13th Gemini Awards in 1998 for Twitch City, at the 21st Gemini Awards in 2006 for the television film Heyday!, and at the 22nd Gemini Awards in 2007 for Slings & Arrows.
