= John Kim (designer) =

John Kim is a Canadian film and television art director and set designer, who was the winner alongside Jason Clarke and Richard Racicot of the Canadian Screen Award for Best Art Direction/Production Design in a Film at the 11th Canadian Screen Awards in 2023 for their work on the film Brother.

His other credits have included the films Falling and Crimes of the Future and the television series Designated Survivor, The Umbrella Academy, and Star Trek: Discovery.
