= Richard Racicot =

Richard Racicot is a Canadian film and television production designer, art director and set decorator, who was the winner alongside Jason Clarke and John Kim of the Canadian Screen Award for Best Art Direction/Production Design in a Film at the 11th Canadian Screen Awards in 2023 for their work on the film Brother.
