= Nigel Churcher =

Canadian film art director

Nigel Churcher is a Canadian film art director. He is most noted for his work on the 2014 film Pompeii, for which he won the Canadian Screen Award for Best Art Direction/Production Design at the 3rd Canadian Screen Awards in 2015 with Paul Denham Austerberry.

He was subsequently nominated in the same category at the 10th Canadian Screen Awards in 2022, for his work on the film The Exchange.
