= Peter Cosco =

Canadian Production Designer

Peter Cosco is a Canadian production designer. He is most noted for his work on the film 40 Acres, for which he won the Canadian Screen Award for Best Art Direction/Production Design at the 14th Canadian Screen Awards in 2026.

He previously won the Directors Guild of Canada award for Best Production Design in a Feature Film in 2023, for his work on Women Talking.
