= Matthew Bianchi =

Canadian film and TV production designer

Matthew Bianchi is a Canadian film and television production designer, art director and set decorator. He is most noted for his work on the film The Kid Detective, for which he and Jennifer Morden received a Canadian Screen Award nomination for Best Art Direction/Production Design at the 9th Canadian Screen Awards in 2020.

A graduate of Ryerson University, Bianchi's other credits have included the films Paradise Falls, How to Plan an Orgy in a Small Town, Cardinals, Paper Year, Heavy and Something You Said Last Night.
