= Wolf Kroeger =

Wolf Kroeger is a German-Canadian production designer and art director, most noted as a three-time Genie Award winner for Best Art Direction/Production Design. He won the award at the 29th Canadian Film Awards in 1978 for In Praise of Older Women, at the 6th Genie Awards in 1985 for The Bay Boy, and at the 14th Genie Awards in 1993 for Shadow of the Wolf.

He was also a nominee in the same category at the 1st Genie Awards in 1980 for It Rained All Night the Day I Left, and a British Academy Film Award nominee for Best Production Design at the 46th British Academy Film Awards in 1993 for The Last of the Mohicans.
