= Riot Girls =

2019 Canadian post-apocalyptic science fiction film

- Film poster
- Directed by: Jovanka Vuckovic
- Written by: Katherine Collins
- Produced by: Lauren Grant
- Starring: Madison Iseman; Paloma Kwiatkowski; Munro Chambers; Jenny Raven
- Cinematography: Celiana Cárdenas
- Edited by: Maureen Grant
- Music by: Peter Chapman
- Production company: Clique Pictures
- Distributed by: Cranked Up Films levelFILM
- Release date: 6 July 2019 (Neuchâtel)
- Running time: 81 minutes
- Country: Canada
- Language: English

Riot Girls is a 2019 Canadian post-apocalyptic science fiction film, directed by Jovanka Vuckovic.

== Plot ==
Set in the town of Potter's Bluff, where a mysterious virus has killed all the adults and left society entirely in the hands of rival teen gangs, the film stars Madison Iseman and Paloma Kwiatkowski as Nat and Scratch, a lesbian couple who must go behind enemy lines to rescue Nat's brother Jack (Alexandre Bourgeois) after he is captured by the wealthy and powerful West Side gang led by jock Jeremy (Munro Chambers).

== Cast ==
- Madison Iseman as Nat
- Paloma Kwiatkowski as Scratch
- Alexandre Bourgeois as Nat's brother Jack
- Munro Chambers as Jeremy
- Jenny Raven as Caine
- Atticus Mitchell as Cracker
- Carson MacCormac as Spit

== Production and filming ==
In September 2016, Clique Pictures announced that Jovanka Vuckovic was to direct the apocalyptic horror film. With financing procured from Telefilm Canada, Head Gear Films, the Northern Ontario Heritage Fund, the Ontario Media Development Corporation, Search Engine Films, Urban Post Production, She Wolf Films, and the Harold Greenberg Fund, the cast was announced in October 2017, as well as the start of filming.

The film was shot in Parry Sound, Hamilton, Ontario and Toronto. XYZ Films handled sales for North America, with Alliance Media Partners in charge of international. In January 2019, Cranked Up Films acquired the U.S. distribution rights from XYZ Films.

== Reception ==
=== Critical response ===
On the review aggregator website Rotten Tomatoes, 90% of 21 critics' reviews are positive, with an average rating of 7.2/10. Metacritic, which uses a weighted average, assigned the film a score of 59 out of 100, based on 6 critics, indicating "mixed or average" reviews.

The Globe and Mail's Anne T. Donahue gave the film 3.5/4 stars, writing, "Thanks to Iseman and Kwiatkowski's heartwarming chemistry, Collins's sharp dialogue and Vuckovic's pointed direction, you find yourself running in step with two young women who are smart, interesting, brave and brilliantly capable." Katie Walsh of the Los Angeles Times wrote, "despite its audacious premise and style, Riot Girls feels at times underwritten, a few of the performances under-baked. Kwiatkowski and Iseman carry the film, but such a sprawling world is heavy lifting. Nevertheless, Vuckovic ably showcases her fetchingly energetic aesthetic."

John DeFore of The Hollywood Reporter wrote, "Appealing cinematography and engaging use of split-frame comic-book transitions are the closest the film comes to the excitement of 1990s DIY scene-making; the rest is just derivative genre filler."

=== Award nominations ===
The film received five Canadian Screen Award nominations at the 8th Canadian Screen Awards in 2020, for Achievement in Art Direction/Production Design (Jennifer Morden and Danny Haeberlin), Achievement in Make-Up (Brandi Boulet and Chris Bridges), Achievement in Hair (Dann Campbell), Achievement in Music – Original Score (Peter Chapman), and Achievement in Music – Original Song (Peter Chapman and Leslie Seaforth for "We Run the World").

== See also ==
- Lord of the Flies
- Riot grrrl
