= The Kid Detective =

2020 comedy-drama film

- Theatrical release poster
- Directed by: Evan Morgan
- Written by: Evan Morgan
- Produced by: Jonathan Bronfman; William Woods
- Starring: Adam Brody; Sophie Nélisse; Tzi Ma; Wendy Crewson; Sarah Sutherland
- Cinematography: Mike McLaughlin
- Edited by: Curt Lobb
- Music by: Jay McCarrol
- Production companies: Woods Entertainment; JoBro Productions; Aqute Media
- Distributed by: Levelfilm
- Release dates: September 13, 2020 (TIFF); October 16, 2020 (United States)
- Running time: 97 minutes
- Country: Canada
- Language: English
- Budget: $3 million
- Box office: $367,908

The Kid Detective is a 2020 Canadian mystery comedy-drama film written and directed by Evan Morgan and starring Adam Brody, Sophie Nélisse, Wendy Crewson, Sarah Sutherland, and Tzi Ma. It was inspired by the Encyclopedia Brown book series.

The Kid Detective was screened in the industry program at the 2020 Toronto International Film Festival. It received a national theatrical release in the U.S. on October 16, 2020, as the second wave of the COVID-19 pandemic in the United States took hold.

== Plot ==
As a child, Abe Applebaum was a local celebrity as a "kid detective", solving minor mysteries and crimes for the residents of the town of Willowbrook. When he was twelve, his close friend, Gracie Gulliver, disappeared. Despite his investigation, neither he nor the police were able to find her, leaving him traumatized.

Now 32, Abe continues to operate his detective agency, despite concerns from his family and derision from his peers for his failure to "grow up". Depressed over his struggling business and the complete lack of respect he is given, he abuses alcohol and drugs to cope. An orphaned high school student named Caroline approaches him for help investigating the murder of her boyfriend, Patrick Chang. Despite never having investigated a murder case before, Abe sees this as a chance to prove himself and agrees to take the case for free.

Their investigation leads to the discovery of several secrets that Patrick had kept from Caroline, such as his involvement in drug dealing and his affair with an older girl named Melody. They also learn that Patrick's friend Calvin is in love with Caroline, and that Calvin resented their relationship. However, Abe's clumsy investigative methods also leads to several mishaps, such as angering Patrick's father and being arrested for sneaking into Calvin's house. He eventually reaches a breakthrough when he realizes that a series of origami roses given to Caroline were not from Patrick, as she assumed, but are identical to ones that were on Gracie’s desk when she disappeared 20 years ago. When he also learns that the person he implicated in the theft of school fundraiser money as a child was actually innocent, he is able to deduce the identity of both Gracie's kidnapper and Patrick's killer as being high school principal Erwin.

Abe confronts Principal Erwin at his home and reveals what he has learned. Erwin had become obsessed with Gracie and plotted to kidnap her. The theft of the school fundraiser money had been a test to see if Abe really was as good a detective as people thought, and when he failed to solve the case correctly, Erwin felt confident in carrying out his plan. Caroline is, in fact, the daughter of Gracie and Erwin, having been conceived as a result of Erwin's rape of Gracie while he held Gracie captive; Erwin secretly left baby Caroline at a church after her birth. When Erwin found a lewd picture of Melody in Patrick's locker, he mistook it for Caroline and killed Patrick in revenge for "ruining" her. With his crimes revealed, and confronted by the fact that he murdered Patrick over a mistake, Erwin stabs himself to death in front of Abe. Abe subsequently discovers Gracie, still alive, locked in a shed in Erwin's yard.

Abe is hailed as a hero for solving the 20-year-old cold case and rescuing Gracie, restoring his respect in town, and greatly boosting his agency's business. However, he is haunted by the recent events, and when his parents come to check on him, he breaks down sobbing.

== Cast ==
- Adam Brody as Abe Applebaum
- Sophie Nélisse as Caroline
- Tzi Ma as Mr. Chang
- Sharon Crandall as Mrs. Chang
- Peter MacNeill as Principal Erwin
- Maurice Dean Wint as Constable Cleary
- Jonathan Whittaker as Mr. Applebaum
- Wendy Crewson as Mrs. Applebaum
- Sarah Sutherland as Lucy
- Amalia Williamson as Melodie Miller
- Lian McLean-Smits - Patrick Chang

== Production ==
Principal photography took place in North Bay, Ontario, Canada. The movie was filmed in 26 days.

== Release ==
In October 2020, Stage 6 Films acquired distribution rights to the film, and released it theatrically in the United States on October 16, 2020. Level Film set a theatrical release date in Canada for November 6, 2020, and Sony Picture Releasing released the film on November 20, 2020 in the United Kingdom.

== Reception ==
On review aggregator Rotten Tomatoes, The Kid Detective holds an approval rating of 84% based on 64 reviews, with an average rating of 7.1/10. The site's critics consensus reads, "A low-key charmer led by Adam Brody's sharp performance, The Kid Detective uncovers dark comedy in a story of unfulfilled childhood potential." Metacritic gives the film a weighted average score of 74 out of 100, based on 14 critics, indicating "generally favorable reviews".

Writing for Variety, Tomris Laffly said "Adam Brody delivers a layered performance as a past-his-prime PI in debuting director Evan Morgan's sharp crime tale with shockingly dark twists." John Defore of The Hollywood Reporter wrote, "Morgan's script generously allows us to deduce the truth just before Abe stumbles across it, which is not to say it doesn't have some real surprises left. It's fun to watch Abe put A and B together, and to regain some of his self-respect in the process. But even victory will bring mixed emotions, which Morgan conveys with unsettling finesse." The Los Angeles Times' reviewer Michael Ordoña stated, "The Kid Detective is an unexpected mix of disparate elements that in the wrong hands could have resulted in lumpy parody but, fortunately, pours out as something smooth, funny, dark and potent."

The film was named to TIFF's year-end Canada's Top Ten list for feature films. It received four Canadian Screen Award nominations at the 9th Canadian Screen Awards in 2021, for Best Original Screenplay (Morgan), Best Art Direction or Production Design (Jennifer Morden and Matthew Bianchi), Best Original Score (Jay McCarrol) and the John Dunning Best First Feature Award.
