= The Exchange (2021 film) =

- Official release poster
- Directed by: Dan Mazer
- Written by: Tim Long
- Produced by: Dan Hine; Christina Piovesan; Noah Segal
- Starring: Ed Oxenbould; Avan Jogia; Justin Hartley
- Cinematography: Jean-Phillippe Bernier
- Edited by: Mark Davies
- Music by: Michael Smith; Christopher Bauschinger
- Production companies: Elevation Pictures; First Generation Films; Ingenious Media; Los Angeles Media Fund; Who's On First; Screen Australia; Telefilm Canada; Crave
- Distributed by: Elevation Pictures; Quiver Distribution
- Release date: July 30, 2021 (North America)
- Countries: United States; United Kingdom; Australia; Canada
- Language: English

The Exchange is a 2021 internationally co-produced comedy-drama film directed by Dan Mazer from a screenplay by Tim Long. It stars Ed Oxenbould, Avan Jogia and Justin Hartley. The film follows the events triggered by outcast student Tim Long entering an exchange program hoping to get a sophisticated kindred spirit sent from France but instead ending up with more than he bargained for when the outgoing Stéphane turns up in his quiet Canadian town.

It was released in the United States and Canada on July 30, 2021, by Elevation Pictures and Quiver Distribution.

== Plot ==
Winter 1986, a small Canadian town called Hobart which is still suffering the effects of financial recession.

Tim, a student with pretensions of sophistication, enters a student exchange program in hopes the French student will share his love of the cultured things in life. Something he feels is sorely lacking in his provincial classmates. To his dismay the exchangee, Stéphane, is not what he expected. Outgoing, fashion conscious, with a healthy appetite for sex and little interest in "culture". Stéphane is initially able to quickly charm those around him like teaching assistant Diane. Even her domineering boyfriend Gary Rothbauer, school gym teacher and local part-time policeman, initially takes to Stéphane. Partly because he laughed at his joke but also due to his soccer skills.

Walking with Diane, Gary decides to take advantage of a closing down sale. Leaving Diane outside to hold the shopping, he bullies the owner into a better deal on already discounted shoes. The final straw for the bankrupt shop-keep, while seemingly going to fetch stock, instead goes to the top of his shop to jump off. Unaware, Diane is in his path. Passing on the other side of the street with Tim, Stéphane spots what is about to happen and rushes to sweep Diane off her feet out of danger. Diane is saved and the shop-keep is unharmed. Stéphane is hailed a hero, to the chagrin of Gary and further overshadowing Tim. Stéphane quickly becomes more popular, excelling at making friends and wooing the girls. During a ride home from school Tim sits awkwardly in the front with Brenda Crowfoot (a classmate with a crush on him) while Stéphane energetically has sex in the backseat with classmate Mary. Stéphane even manages to give sage advice to Tim's father about sharing his mounting business woes with his wife. Tim's father in return tries to help the young exchange student bond with his son, leading Stéphane and Tim to an eventful night-time drive.

Not everything goes smoothly for Stéphane, The school bullies target him for racist abuse by pasting his photo onto a newspaper about terrorists. Persistent goading on the soccer field leads to Stéphane headbutting the offending player. Gary uses the red carding as pretext to denigrate the benched player leading to a heated outpouring against the town and its White Squirrel mascot from Stéphane. Seeing Gary's jealous and spiteful behavior for what it is Diane breaks up with him.

With his relations with the town souring, Stéphane's rocky friendship with Tim takes a nosedive. Earlier Stéphane had swapped Tim's presentation video for one the pair had drunkenly made wherein Tim proclaimed his appreciation for Brenda, with the intent she will see it and the two will finally get together. Instead the video ends up played for the whole class, humiliating Tim and driving a wedge between the friends. Stéphane moves out of Tim's home to stay with Brenda and her brothers, the Crowfoots. The Crowfoots are themselves on the outskirts of town "polite society" being First Nations and thus sympathetic to Stéphane's treatment by the other townspeople.

When the White Squirrel float is found destroyed Stéphane is blamed, Gary particularly insistent he's the culprit. At the White Squirrel parade Stéphane is arrested in front of the whole town. Tim, despite their differences, makes an impassioned plea in his defense with his father stepping forward with an alibi. The suspicion of guilt falls on Gary, who first protests, offering his alibi of having sex with Diane at the time. However, she is among the crowd and angrily refutes this claim, having previously broken up with him. Caught very publicly in a lie and crime, Gary makes a run for it but is quickly clotheslined by Brenda's brother and arrested. A now exonerated Stéphane and Tim patch up their relationship. Events prove cathartic for many as Tim's parents finally discuss their financial problems openly while Tim and Brenda kiss.

A reversal of the film's plot sees Tim has traveled to France as an exchange student to be among Stéphane's friends in Paris at the end.

== Cast ==
- Ed Oxenbould as Tim
- Avan Jogia as Stéphane
- Justin Hartley as Gary Rothbauer
- Jennifer Irwin as Sheila
- Paul Braunstein as Glenn
- Jayli Wolf as Brenda
- Kathy Greenwood as Mrs. Fleming
- Melanie Leishman as Diane
- Rodrigo Fernandez-Stoll as Kevin
- Brandon Oakes as Neil Crowfoot

== Production ==
In April 2019, it was announced Ed Oxenbould, Avan Jogia and Justin Hartley had joined the cast of the film, with Dan Mazer directing from a screenplay by Tim Long.

Principal photography began in April 2019. Filming took place in Almonte, Carleton Place, and Ottawa, Ontario. The film is set in the fictional town of Hobart, Ontario, a thinly-disguised version of Long's hometown of Exeter.

Costume designer was Lea Carlson, responsible for the '80s fashions worn by the film's characters.

== Release ==
In May 2021, Quiver Distribution acquired US distribution rights to the film. It was released in the United States and Canada on July 30, 2021.

== Reception ==
On the review aggregator website Rotten Tomatoes, 65% of 17 critics' reviews are positive.

In 2023, Barry Hertz of The Globe and Mail named the film as one of the 23 best Canadian comedy films ever made.

=== Accolades ===
Year	Award	Category	Recipient(s)	Result	Ref.
2022	10th Canadian Screen Awards	Best Art Direction/Production Design	Nigel Churcher	Nominated	
2022	10th Canadian Screen Awards	Costume Design	Lea Carlson	Nominated	
2022	10th Canadian Screen Awards	Best Hair	Debra Johnson	Nominated	
