= Once A Tree =

Canadian musical duo

- Genres: Folk; electronic; indie pop
- Years active: 2013–present
- Members: Jayli Wolf; Hayden Wolf
- Website: www.onceatreemusic.com

Once A Tree are a Canadian music duo consisting of married couple Jayli and Hayden Wolf. They began in folk music before moving towards a more electronic sound.

== Background ==
The Wolfs were both raised as Jehovah's Witnesses in British Columbia; Jayli from Creston and Hayden from Vernon, and met online through mutual friends. Jayli decided to leave the religion and convinced Hayden to join her. The pair moved to Toronto together when Jayli won a songwriting contest and married in 2012. They have said songwriting has helped them deal with difficult experiences.

== Career ==
Once A Tree debuted with a self-titled EP and the single "Light Me Up".

Their first professional EP Thousand Lives, released in 2015 under Toronto-based Foreseen Entertainment, followed the single "Howling", inspired by their childhood religion. They continued working with Foreseen, going on to release their first album Phoenix in 2017. Rolling Stone named them "New Artists You Need to Know" and compared them favourably to Phantogram, Crystal Castles, and Chvrches. Phoenix won Best Electronic Music Album at the 2018 Indigenous Music Awards.

For the single "Breakdown", which Hayden based on his own mental health crisis and dedicated to his late brother who took his own life earlier that year, Once A Tree partnered with Kelowna General Hospital for their Not Alone Campaign. Proceeds went towards establishing mental health facilities for youths in British Columbia.

In 2018, Once A Tree were the subject of a documentary on Juno TV. They participated in the SOCAN Kenekt Song Camp in Nicaragua. "Born for This" became part of a Nissan television campaign, and "Worth" had an anti-bullying music video. Once A Tree performed the anthem "We Are One" for the 2019 Canadian Premier League.

The duo released their second album Fool's Paradise independently in 2020. Fool's Paradise was described as more lighthearted than their previous work, which Hayden attributed to coming "to a much happier place in life". The single "Rush" was filmed in Los Angeles, and the acoustic version featured Boy Pape.

Jayli also acts and releases solo music, such as "Child of the Government" about her First Nations father being taken in the Sixties Scoop; Hayden is a visual artist and photographer. They co-write most of their songs, and produce most of their music videos themselves.

== Discography ==
=== Albums ===
Title	Details
Phoenix	Released: 2017 Label: Foreseen Entertainment
Fool's Paradise	Released: 2020 Label: Alt Eden Inc.

=== EPs ===
Title	Details
Once A Tree	Released: 2013
Thousand Lives	Released: 2015 Label: Foreseen Entertainment
The Good, the Bad	Released: 2021 Label: Alt Eden Inc.
I Wonder How This Ends	Released: 2024 Label: Alt Eden Inc.

=== Singles ===
- "Light Me Up" (2014)
- "Howling" (2015)
- "Breakdown" (2017)
- "Coming Down" (2017)
- "Fine" (2017)
- "Born for This" (2018)
- "We Are One" (2019) for the Canadian Premier League
- "Worth" (2019)
- "Run" (2019)
- "What You Say" (2019)
- "Whatever You Do Kid" (2019)
- "Rush" (2020)
- "3 Day Trip" (2020)
- "Black Dog" (2021)
- "Skull Candy" (2023)
- "Perfection" (2024)
- "Rainy Days" (2024)
- "small town dreams" (2025)
- "Vampire Girl" (2026)

== Awards and nominations ==
Year	Award	Category	Work	Result	Ref
2018	Indigenous Music Awards	Best Electronic Music Album	Phoenix	Won	
