= All the World Fades Away =

Studio album by Jim Cuddy
- Released: June 14, 2024
- Recorded: 2020–2023
- Genre: Country rock
- Length: 53:25
- Label: Warner Music Canada
- Producer: Jim Cuddy; Tim Vesely; Colin Cripps

Jim Cuddy chronology
Countrywide Soul (2019)	All the World Fades Away (2024)

All the World Fades Away is the sixth studio album by Canadian singer-songwriter Jim Cuddy, released on June 14, 2024.

== History ==
Cuddy wrote and released an acoustic single of the song "Good News" in 2020, inspired by his experience with the COVID-19 pandemic. This release marked the start of a three-year long development of the album, during which he recorded and toured Blue Rodeo as guitarist and co-lead vocalist. In May 2024, prior to the release of this album, Cuddy announced a live tour series which he would begin the day following the release of the album on June 15th, 2024, which would run through the end of the year.

== Track listing ==
The album consists of 12 tracks, with a total album duration of 53:25.

All tracks are written by Jim Cuddy

All the World Fades Away track listing
No.	Title	Length
1.	"Learn to Live Alone"	4:34
2.	"You Belong"	5:10
3.	"Anywhere Else But Home"	4:46
4.	"Impossible"	3:50
5.	"All the World Fades Away"	4:51
6.	"Scars"	5:41
7.	"Too Far Gone"	4:44
8.	"Torn"	4:15
9.	"Everyday Angels"	3:10
10.	"Good News"	3:41
11.	"Holding It Down"	4:03
12.	"Say Goodbye"	4:46
Total length:		53:25

== Personnel ==
Credits adapted from album's liner notes.

- Jim Cuddy – lead vocals, guitar
- Bazil Donovan – bass guitar
- Joel Anderson – drums
- Colin Cripps – guitars, backing vocals
- Steve O'Connor – keyboards
- Anne Lindsay – violin, backing vocals

Guest musicians/personnel

- Jenn Grant – backing vocals on "Scars"
- Greg Keelor – backing vocals on "Everyday Angels"
- Kevin Fox – cello
- Tim Vesely – percussion, backing vocals
