= It Rained All Night the Day I Left =

- Film poster
- Directed by: Nicolas Gessner
- Written by: Ted Allan; Pierre Pelegri; Richard Winckler
- Produced by: Claude Giroux; Claude Léger; Shlomo Mugrabi
- Starring: Tony Curtis; Louis Gossett Jr.; Sally Kellerman; John Vernon; Lisa Langlois
- Cinematography: Richard Ciupka
- Edited by: Yves Langlois
- Music by: Alain Leroux
- Production companies: Les Films Caneuram; C.O.F.C.I. Israfilm
- Distributed by: Gaumont Distribution
- Release date: November 23, 1980
- Running time: 100 minutes
- Countries: Canada; France; Israel
- Language: English

It Rained All Night the Day I Left is a comedy film made in 1978 but not theatrically released until 1980. Directed by Nicolas Gessner, the film was a co-production of film studios from Canada, France and Israel.

The film stars Tony Curtis and Louis Gossett Jr. as two gun-runners making a trip through the desert to transport guns for The Colonel (Sally Kellerman). The film's cast also includes John Vernon and Lisa Langlois.

The film was released theatrically in Europe, both in its original English and in a dubbed French version titled Deux affreux sur le sable. It received no theatrical release in North America; it premiered as a television film on CTV and The Movie Channel on August 23, 1982.

Gossett's role had originally been slated to be performed by Billy Dee Williams.

Kellerman later dismissed her performance in the film, telling the press that "I always say that I was solidly mediocre and everybody else stunk."

== Awards and nominations ==
The film garnered four Genie Award nominations at the 1st Genie Awards in 1980:

- Best Foreign Actress: Sally Kellerman
- Best Adapted Screenplay: Ted Allan
- Best Art Direction/Production Design: Wolf Kroeger
- Best Original Score: Alain Leroux

It did not win any of the awards.
