= Being at Home with Claude =

- Video tape cover
- Directed by: Jean Beaudin
- Written by: René-Daniel Dubois
- Produced by: Léon G. Arcand; Louise Gendron
- Starring: Roy Dupuis; Jacques Godin; Jean-François Pichette
- Cinematography: Thomas Vámos
- Edited by: André Corriveau
- Music by: Richard Grégoire
- Production companies: Les Productions du Cerf; National Film Board of Canada
- Distributed by: Alliance Vivafilm; Strand Releasing
- Release date: February 7, 1992 (RVCQ)
- Running time: 85 minutes
- Country: Canada
- Language: French

Being at Home with Claude is a 1992 Canadian drama film directed by Jean Beaudin and based on the play by René-Daniel Dubois. The film stars Roy Dupuis as Yves, a gay man who has just murdered his lover Claude (Jean-François Pichette), and is attempting to explain his reasons to the police investigator (Jacques Godin).

The film premiered at the Rendez-vous du cinéma québécois in February 1992. It was also screened in the Un Certain Regard section at the 1992 Cannes Film Festival.

The film was co-produced by Les Productions du Cerf and the National Film Board of Canada.

== Cast ==
- Roy Dupuis as Yves
- Jacques Godin as Inspector
- Jean-François Pichette as Claude
- Gaston Lepage as Stenographer
- Hugo Dubé as Policeman
- Johanne-Marie Tremblay as Inspector's Wife
- Nathalie Mallette as Yves's Sister
- Lothaire Bluteau as Male Prostitute

== Critical response ==
Ray Conlogue of The Globe and Mail criticized Beaudin's decision to depict Claude's murder as the very first scene in the movie, writing that it robbed the movie of "the precious ambiguity of our feelings about Yves. Instead of letting him lead us - along with the police interrogator - slowly, carefully, with almost virginal reticence, into the interior world that dictated Claude's death, we are slapped in the face with it." He ultimately concluded that the film's success or failure "depends on whether you can persuade yourself that Dubois, self-styled 'transgressor of our fears' and gainsayer of God, succeeds in his project. If he does, then the film does. For my part, I found it a brilliant essay in moral myopia."

Craig MacInnis of the Toronto Star criticized the casting of Dupuis in the lead role, calling him a "human side of beef" who was "not equal to the demands of the script", and compared his performance unfavourably to the performance of Lothaire Bluteau in the original stage play.

Rick Groen of The Globe and Mail identified the film's religious underpinnings, writing that "it's a short jump from Romance to religion ("He transfigured me. He's alive in me"), and Beaudin adds a few Catholic fillips to the tale - the judge's chamber comes with stained-glass windows, the Inspector is clearly a father-confessor, and the murder is filmed as a blood-and-wine sacrament. But that's really only ornamental. Beneath the ornamentation, there's a sturdier reason why this work has the power to cut across different audiences and survive its different castings (here, Godin is hard-working and wonderful; Dupuis is merely hard-working). And the reason is simple. For all its seamy, aberrant, amoral exterior, what we're actually seeing is a typically Keatsian lament "half in love with easeful Death," a classically blissful tragedy complete with star-crossed duo."

== Awards ==
Award	Date of ceremony	Category	Film	Result	Ref.
Genie Awards	1992	Best Motion Picture	Léon G. Arcand, Louise Gendron	Nominated	
Genie Awards	1992	Best Director	Jean Beaudin	Nominated	
Genie Awards	1992	Best Actor	Jacques Godin	Nominated	
Genie Awards	1992	Best Art Direction/Production Design	François Séguin	Nominated	
Genie Awards	1992	Best Cinematography	Thomas Vámos	Nominated	
Genie Awards	1992	Best Editing	André Corriveau	Nominated	
Genie Awards	1992	Best Overall Sound	Jo Caron, Michel Descombes, Michel Charron, Luc Boudrias	Nominated	
Genie Awards	1992	Best Sound Editing	Jérôme Décarie, Mathieu Beaudin, Carole Gagnon, Marcel Pothier	Nominated	
Genie Awards	1992	Best Original Score	Richard Grégoire	Won	
