= Rob Gray (art director) =

Canadian production designer and art director

Rob Gray (November 24, 1962 – December 21, 2016) was an award-winning Canadian production designer and art director. Gray was best known for his work on the TV miniseries Sons of Liberty, as well as The Stone Angel and The Cult.

Gray won Genie Awards for his work in Falling Angels and Fido. He also won DGC Awards for Fido and the miniseries Sea Wolf. He died of cancer on Dec. 21 at the age of 54. The Jim Cuddy (with whom Gray was longtime friends with) album Constellations was dedicated in memory of Gray. The album's title track 'Constellations' recounts a night at Cuddy's farmhouse (with other friends) shortly before Gray's death.

== Recognition ==
- 2007 Genie Award for Best Achievement in Art Direction/Production Design – Fido – Won (shared with James Willcock)
- 2006 Gemini Award for Best Production Design or Art Direction in a Dramatic Program or Series – The Love Crimes of Gillian Guess – Nominated
- 2004 Genie Award for Best Achievement in Art Direction/Production Design – Falling Angels – Won (shared with Christina Kuhnigk)
- 2004 DGC Craft Award for Outstanding Achievement in Production Design – Feature Film – Falling Angels – Nominated
- 2003 DGC Craft Award for Outstanding Achievement in Production Design – Long Form – The Bay of Love and Sorrows – Nominated
- 2017 Dedication – Cardinal
