= Anne Pritchard =

Canadian production designer, art director and set decorator

- Born: 1935; Stratford, Ontario, Canada
- Died: 2025 (aged 89–90)
- Known for: production design, art direction
- Awards: Etrog Award for Best Art Direction/Production Design; 1970 The Act of the Heart; 1976 The Far Shore; Genie Award for Best Art Direction/Production Design; 1980 Atlantic City, U.S.A. 1985 Joshua Then and Now; Genie Award for Best Costume Design; 1980 Fantastica; Jutra Award for Best Art Direction; 2012 Laurence Anyways

Anne Pritchard (1935–2025) was a Canadian production designer, art director and set decorator. She was most noted as a four-time Etrog and Genie award winner for Best Art Direction/Production Design, winning at the 22nd Canadian Film Awards in 1970 for The Act of the Heart, at the 27th Canadian Film Awards in 1976 for The Far Shore, at the 2nd Genie Awards in 1981 for Atlantic City, U.S.A., and at the 7th Genie Awards in 1986 for Joshua Then and Now, and a Genie Award winner for Best Costume Design at the 2nd Genie Awards for Fantastica.

She received six other nominations for Best Art Direction/Production Design over the course of her career: for Fantastica at the 2nd Genie Awards, for Threshold at the 4th Genie Awards in 1983, for The Revolving Doors (Les Portes tournantes) at the 10th Genie Awards in 1989, for Perfectly Normal at the 12th Genie Awards in 1991, for The Art of War at the 21st Genie Awards in 2000, and for Laurence Anyways at the 1st Canadian Screen Awards in 2013.

For Laurence Anyways, she was the winner of the Jutra Award for Best Art Direction at the 15th Jutra Awards in 2013.
