= Angel's Rage =

2006 film

- Film poster
- French: La Rage de l'ange
- Directed by: Dan Bigras
- Written by: Dan Bigras
- Produced by: Arnie Gelbart
- Cinematography: Guy Dufaux
- Edited by: Michel Grou
- Music by: Dan Bigras
- Production company: Alliance Atlantis Vivafilm
- Distributed by: Motion Picture Distribution LP
- Release date: March 31, 2006 (Quebec)
- Running time: 107 minutes
- Country: Canada
- Language: French

Angel's Rage (French: La Rage de l'ange) is a 2006 Canadian drama film directed by Dan Bigras. The film earned two Genie Award nominations in the categories of Best Achievement in Art Direction/Production Design and Best Achievement in Music - Original Song for the song "L'Astronaute".
