= Perfectly Normal =

- Directed by: Yves Simoneau
- Written by: writer Paul Quarrington screenplay Eugene Lipinski
- Produced by: Michael Burns
- Starring: Robbie Coltrane; Michael Riley
- Cinematography: Alain Dostie
- Edited by: Ronald Sanders
- Music by: Richard Grégoire
- Production company: BSB
- Distributed by: Alliance Films (Canada); Four Seasons Entertainment (United States)
- Release date: 1990
- Running time: 107 minutes
- Countries: Canada; United Kingdom
- Language: English
- Budget: $3.775 million
- Box office: $291,000

Perfectly Normal is a Canadian comedy film directed by Yves Simoneau, which premiered at the 1990 Festival of Festivals, before going into general theatrical release in 1991. Simoneau's first English-language film, it was written by Eugene Lipinski and Paul Quarrington.

== Plot ==
Renzo Parachi, a mild-mannered man living in the small town of Long Bay, Ontario, whose quiet, unassuming life working at the local brewery and playing hockey for the company team is transformed when Alonzo Turner comes to town, ingratiating himself as Renzo's new roommate and convincing him to invest in an Italian restaurant where the servers will sing Bellini's Norma.

== Cast ==
- Robbie Coltrane as Alonzo Turner
- Michael Riley as Renzo Parachi
- Deborah Duchene as Denise
- Eugene Lipinski as Hopeless
- Kenneth Welsh as Charlie Glesby
- Patricia Gage as Mrs. Hathaway
- J.D. Nicholsen as Duane Bickle (as Jack Nichols)
- Elizabeth Harpur as Gloria
- Kristina Nicoll as Tiffany
- Peter Millard as Bunden
- Bryan Foster as Gig Manyon
- Andrew Miller as Pizza Guy
- Warren Van Evera as Old Man
- Douglas C. Frye as Boy in Cab
- Graham Harley as Middle-aged Man
- Ellen-Ray Hennessy as Clairvoyant
- Gene Dinovi as Priest
- Gino Marrocco as Uncle Thomas
- Roc LaFortune as St. John's Ambulance Man

== Production ==
=== Development ===
Eugene Lipinski stated that Renzo was based on his own life. He wrote the first draft while on vacation in Portugal for two weeks in 1987. He showed the script to potential backers while pretending to be a friend of Steven Spielberg. Multiple people were interested in supporting the film and Lipinski selected Michael Burns. Burns stated that Lipinski's idea for the film "really did sing", but that the script was "basically gibberish".

Telefilm Canada contributed funding to the script's development due to a noncommittal letter of distribution interest from Cineplex Odeon Films. The Ontario Film Development Corporation initially gave $10,000 in July 1988, and later another $25,000.

Burns had Paul Quarrington write the second draft. Quarrington suggested that Robbie Coltrane play the lead character. Burns asked his friend Harry Ditson to show Quarrington's draft to Coltrane. Coltrane accepted the role and was paid $180,000 for seven weeks of shooting. Quarrington stated that he did not "think anything, really, survived" from Lipinski's original version. Lipinski and Quarrington did not meet until Burns introduced them after Lipinski came to record voice-overs for Love and Hate: The Story of Colin and JoAnn Thatcher in fall of 1988.

Burns interviewed fifteen to twenty people for the position of director. He wanted Phillip Borsos to direct, but Burns changed his mind after a bad meeting with Borsos. Burns was divided between John Paizs and Yves Simoneau. He liked Paizs's comedic sense, but he was inexperienced and Simoneau was "a born movie director", but had never directed an English-language film. He selected Simoneau, who was paid $125,000.

=== Financing ===
The film had a budget of $3.775 million making it the most expensive Canadian film of 1990. The budget had $1.5 million in contributions from Telefilm, $750,000 from British equity, $725,000 from the OFDC, $425,000 from private investors, $350,000 from Alliance Films, and $25,000 in deferrals.

Alliance purchased the distribution rights for $350,000. They offered to purchase the international distribution rights for $250,000, but only if Howie Mandel was the co-star. Alliance later offered Burns 5% of the film's gross sales in exchange for the international rights, but Burns rejected it as he felt it was wrong for him to be profiting off of the film before the rest of its investors.

Wayne Clarkson, the CEO of the OFDC, aided in obtaining $725,000 in funding for the film. Clarkson created a deal with Simon Relph, the head of British Screen Financing, in which Perfectly Normal and The Reflecting Skin would be co-financed. The Reflecting Skin was suffering financial problems due to Zenith Productions withdrawing its $1 million investment. Canadian agencies would invest into the film in exchange for the BSP buying equity for Perfectly Normal.

Burns attempted to sell the film's broadcast license in the United Kingdom to capitalize on Coltrane's involvement. He sent the second draft to British Satellite Broadcasting, but Cici Dempsey, their contact, threw it away as she hated Lipinski's first draft. Burns requested another copy from Lipinski's agent Elizabeth Dench, who asked for Lipinski to send photocopies of his copy of Quarrington's script. Burns submitted the script to Dempsey without noticing that Lipinski wrote shit and fuck in the margins using crayons. British Satellite Broadcasting bought the film's pay-TV rights for $343,000, the highest pre-sale in Canadian history.

=== Editing ===
Burns initially obtained the rights to use twelve minutes of music by Sergei Prokofiev, but Simoneau used nineteen minutes in the film. Burns was able to persuade the rights holders to give him the extra time without paying more. Burns and Simoneau completed a two hour and five minute long rough cut on 23 January 1990, after two weeks of editing. It was shown to officials at Telefilm, OFDC, Alliance, investors, and other people the next day and received positive reviews. Burns mostly completed the editing process with Ronald Sanders by the end of February, but continued until May after being rejected by the Cannes Film Festival.

== Release ==
The film was the opening night gala of the Toronto Festival of Festivals.

Miramax and New Line Cinema were both interested in acquiring the distribution rights for the United States. Burns attempted to start a bidding war after New Line Cinema offered an advance of $400,000 and $500,000 in advertising, but Harvey Weinstein declined to make an offer. The deal with New Line Cinema fell through after they demanded full editing control. Burns unsuccessfully offered the rights to Castle Hill Productions, Orion Classics, and The Samuel Goldwyn Company. Samuel Goldwyn's agents left twenty minutes into the screening.

The theatrical release in Canada was delayed, against the wishes of Alliance, in order to wait for someone to acquire the rights for the United States. The rights were sold to Four Seasons Entertainment for an advance of USD110,000 and USD603,000 in advertising.

Perfectly Normal opened in 25 theatres after Alliance spent $250,000 marketing the film. It was mostly unsuccessful except for its showings at the Carlton Cinema, where it earned $225,000 after 40 weeks. The success at the Carlton Cinema was attributed to the larger gay audience in the area and other films in the theatre being sold out. In Quebec the film earned $27,000 in theaters, $18,000 in French and $9,000 in English. It earned $291,000 at the end of its theatrical release.

Four Seasons Entertainment showed the film in 50 markets in the United States, but for only a few weeks. The German distribution rights were sold for USD150,000.

== Reception ==
Variety published a negative review of the film after a press screening before it was shown at the Toronto Festival of Festivals. Burns blamed this review as the reason for New Line Cinema's declining interest. Vincent Canby, writing in The New York Times, stated that it was "precious and slightly out of join" and "ghastly". The Village Voice's review stated that "arty angled camera work succeeds only in making everyone look like they're standing on the decks of the Edmund Fitzgerald".

The film received four Genie Award nominations at the 12th Genie Awards in 1991: Best Picture, Best Original Screenplay (Lipinski and Quarrington), Best Art Direction and Production Design (Anne Pritchard) and Best Editing (Ronald Sanders). Lipinski and Quarrington won the award for Best Original Screenplay.

== Works cited ==
- Posner, Michael (1993). Canadian Dreams: The Making and Marketing of Independent Films. Canadian Independent Film Caucus. ISBN 1550541145.
