= Constellation (Jim Cuddy album) =

Studio album by Jim Cuddy
- Released: January 26, 2018
- Recorded: 2017
- Genre: Country rock
- Length: 49:58
- Label: 5 Corners Productions
- Producers: Jim Cuddy, Colin Cripps, Tim Vesely

Jim Cuddy chronology
Skyscraper Soul (2011)	Constellation (2018)	Countrywide Soul (2019)

Constellation is the fourth studio album by Canadian singer-songwriter Jim Cuddy. It was released on January 26, 2018.

== Reception ==
The lead track from the album, "While I Was Waiting", reached number 11 on CBC Radio 2's Top 20. Critical reception was generally positive, with Exclaim! reviewing the album as "even on otherwise average material, his vocal work is often astonishingly beautiful" and a continuation of "the consistency that has kept Cuddy from too many misfires over 30 years of songwriting".

== Track listing ==
All songs written by Jim Cuddy.

1. "While I Was Waiting" – 4:36
2. "Where You Gonna Run" – 3:54
3. "Constellations" – 4:01
4. "Beauty and Rage" – 4:12
5. "Lonely When You Leave" – 4:04
6. "You Be the Leaver" – 4:25
7. "One Thing Right" – 5:44
8. "Hands on the Glass" – 4:40
9. "Cold Cold Wind" – 6:06
10. "Roses At Your Feet" – 3:23
11. "Things Still Left Unsaid" – 4:52

== Album & Track Trivia ==
The album is dedicated in honour of Cuddy's long-time friend Rob Gray, whom had passed just a year prior to the album's release.

The album's title track Constellations recounts a night at Cuddy's farmhouse (with the above-mentioned Gray, whom was suffering from terminal illness, and 2 friends) shortly before Gray's death. According to Cuddy:

[Constellations] tells the story of fate taking away your precious things. People are gone, and there’s nothing you can do about it. So I wanted to put that in as the most important piece of the song. And that’s why Constellation was named Constellation.

== Personnel ==
Information adapted from official album credits, as per Jim Cuddy's official site.

- Jim Cuddy – vocals and guitars
- Colin Cripps – guitars and backing vocals
- Anne Lindsay – violin and backing vocals
- Bazil Donovan – bass
- Joel Anderson – drums
- Steve O'Connor – keyboards

Guest musicians

- Michael Boguski – organ on "While I Was Waiting" and "Things Still Left Unsaid"
- Jimmy Bowskill – mandolin on "Where You Gonna Run", "Lonely When You Leave", "One Thing Right", "Cold Cold Wind", "Things Still Left Unsaid"; pedal steel on "Hands on the Glass"
- Amy Laing – cello on "Constellations" and "You Be the Leaver"
- Oh Susanna – background vocals on "Cold Cold Wind" and "One Thing Right"

== Charts ==
Chart (2018)	Peak position
Canadian Albums (Billboard)	3
