= Patricia Cuccia =

Canadian set decorator

- Occupation: Set decorator

Patricia Cuccia is a Canadian set decorator. She was nominated for an Academy Award in the category Best Production Design for the film The Brutalist.

== Selected filmography ==
- The Brutalist (2024; co-nominated with Judy Becker)
