= Desire in Motion =

- Mouvements du désir
- Directed by: Léa Pool
- Written by: Léa Pool
- Produced by: Denise Robert
- Starring: Jean-François Pichette; Valérie Kaprisky
- Cinematography: Pierre Mignot
- Edited by: Michel Arcand
- Music by: Zbigniew Preisner
- Production companies: Cinémaginaire; National Film Board of Canada; CatPics Coproductions
- Release date: February 3, 1994 (RVCQ)
- Running time: 93 minutes
- Countries: Canada; Switzerland
- Language: French

Desire in Motion (French: Mouvements du désir) is a 1994 Canadian-Swiss drama film written and directed by Léa Pool. Starring Valérie Kaprisky and Jean-François Pichette, the film follows two passengers who become attracted to one another during a train journey across Canada. It received eight Genie Award nominations.

== Synopsis ==
Catherine travels by train from Montreal to Vancouver with her young daughter Charlotte, hoping to leave behind a failed relationship. Vincent, another passenger, is travelling for reasons connected to his own love life. Although Catherine and Vincent do not initially connect, they become increasingly attracted to one another during the journey. Their encounter is interwoven with dream sequences and episodes involving eccentric passengers.

== Cast ==
The cast includes:

- Valérie Kaprisky as Catherine
- Jean-François Pichette as Vincent
- Jolianne L’Allier-Matteau as Charlotte
- Jacques William as Tom
- Mathew Mackay as Tadzio
- Élise Guilbault as the blind woman
- Noémie Yelle as Mélanie, the blind woman’s daughter

== Production ==
The film was written and directed by Léa Pool. Produced as a Quebec-Swiss co-production, it was made by Cinémaginaire and the National Film Board of Canada, with Swiss co-production participation from CatPics Coproductions. Filming took place over eight weeks in two moving Via Rail train cars, as well as in Toronto and Vancouver.

Pool’s screenplay was inspired by Roland Barthes’ essay A Lover’s Discourse: Fragments and includes partly Fellini-esque characters.

== Release ==
The film premiered at the Rendez-vous du cinéma québécois on February 3, 1994.

== Reception ==
Variety wrote that Desire in Motion was Pool’s “most accessible, viewer-friendly” film to date, while retaining her “moody, introspective style” and “innovative formal flourishes”. Filmdienst described the film as a melancholic reflection on the emergence of love and passion, but wrote that it was weakened by unconvincing music. Filmbulletin wrote that Charlotte was the only character given real complexity. It described the two main characters as surprisingly flat, and wrote that the film’s depiction of female sexuality drew on stale male myths.

== Awards and nominations ==
The film received eight Genie Award nominations, but did not win any.
