= Danny Haeberlin =

Danny Haeberlin is a Canadian film art director and production designer. She is most noted as a two-time Canadian Screen Award nominee for Best Art Direction and Production Design, receiving nods at the 8th Canadian Screen Awards in 2020 for Riot Girls and at the 10th Canadian Screen Awardsin 2022 for All My Puny Sorrows.
