= The Light That Guides You Home =

Studio album by Jim Cuddy
- Released: September 12, 2006
- Genre: Country, Rock
- Length: 55:08
- Label: 5 Corners Productions
- Producer: Jim Cuddy, Colin Cripps

Jim Cuddy chronology
All in Time (1998)	The Light That Guides You Home (2006)	Skyscraper Soul (2011)

Professional ratings
Review scores
Source	Rating
Allmusic	4/5 stars

The Light That Guides You Home is the second album by Jim Cuddy. It was released on September 12, 2006.

== Track listing ==
All songs written by Jim Cuddy.

1. "The Light That Guides You Home" – 5:32
2. "Maybe Sometime" – 4:06
3. "All I Need" – 4:23
4. "Married Again" – 4:33
5. "Pull Me Through" – 5:01
6. "She Gets Down" – 3:12
7. "Countrywide Soul" – 4:47
8. "Will I Be Waiting" – 4:54
9. "One Fine Day" – 4:21
10. "Falling" – 3:58
11. "What She Said" – 4:32
12. "Stagger In" – 5:49

== Credits ==
- Songwriter: Jim Cuddy
- Publishing: Buried Crow Music
- Producer: Jim Cuddy and Colin Cripps
- Associate Producer: Chris Shreenan-Dyck
- Engineer: Chris Shreenan-Dyck
- Mixer: Chris Shreenan-Dyck with Colin Cripps & Jim Cuddy except "Country Wide Soul," "All I Need" & "Stagger In" by Darryl Neudorf with Colin Cripps & Jim Cuddy

== Certifications ==
Country	Certification	Sales/shipments
Canada	Gold	50,000
