= Skyscraper Soul =

Studio album by Jim Cuddy
- Released: September 27, 2011
- Genre: Country rock
- Length: 60:54
- Label: 5 Corners Productions
- Producer: Jim Cuddy, Colin Cripps, Chris Shreenan-Dyck

Jim Cuddy chronology
The Light That Guides You Home (2006)	Skyscraper Soul (2011)	Constellation (2018)

Professional ratings
Review scores
Source	Rating
Allmusic	3/5 stars

Skyscraper Soul is the third album by Jim Cuddy. It was released on September 27, 2011.

== Track listing ==
All songs written by Jim Cuddy.

1. "Skyscraper Soul" — 5:02
2. "Regular Days" — 3:55
3. "Everyone Watched The Wedding" — 5:32
4. "Still Want You" — 4:31
5. "Wash Me Down" — 4:51
6. "Watch Yourself Go Down" — 5:33
7. "Don't Know That Much" — 1:48
8. "Banks of the 49" — 5:12
9. "What Is So Wrong" — 4:36
10. "Ready To Fall" — 4:43
11. "Water's Running High" — 4:24
12. "How In The World" — 3:41
13. "City Birds" (instrumental) — 2:05
14. "With You" — 5:03

== Track Trivia ==
- "Everyone Watched The Wedding" was inspired by the wedding of Prince William and Catherine Middleton

== Personnel (from CD notes) ==
- Jim Cuddy - Vocals, guitars, harmonica, piano
- Basil Donovan - Bass
- Colin Cripps - Guitar, mandoguitar, slide guitar, dobro, vocals
- Steve O'Connor - Piano, organ
- Joel Anderson - Drums, percussion
- Anne Lindsay - Violin, nyckelharpa

== Chart performance ==
Chart (2011)	Peak position
Canadian Albums (Billboard)	8
