= All in Time (album) =

Studio album by Jim Cuddy
- Released: September 8, 1998
- Studio: Chemical Sound (Toronto)
- Genres: Country, rock
- Length: 53:16
- Label: WEA
- Producers: Jim Cuddy; John Whynot

Jim Cuddy chronology
All in Time (1998)	The Light That Guides You Home (2006)

Professional ratings
Review scores
Source	Rating
Allmusic	3/5 stars

All in Time is the debut album by Canadian singer-songwriter Jim Cuddy. It was released by WEA on September 8, 1998. The album peaked at number 38 on the RPM Top Albums chart.

== Track listing ==
All songs written by Jim Cuddy.

1. "Second Son" – 4:23
2. "Whistler" – 5:06
3. "Disappointment" – 4:30
4. "Too Many Hands" – 5:12
5. "New Year's Eve" – 6:33
6. "All in Time" – 5:09
7. "Slide Through Your Hands" – 5:26
8. "I'll Make Believe It's You" – 4:23
9. "Trouble" – 3:59
10. "Making My Way to You" – 3:30
11. "Everybody Cries" – 5:05

== Personnel ==
Personnel taken from All in Time liner notes.

- Jim Cuddy – vocals, guitar
- Gavin Brown – drums
- Bazil Donovan – bass
- Colin Cripps – guitar, vocals
- James Grey – keyboards
- John Whynot – guitar, percussion, piano (10)
- Melanie Doane – violin (1, 2, 4, 10)
- Adele Armin – violin (4, 5, 11)
- Curtis Driedger – violin (10)
- Michelle McAdorey – vocals (1, 2, 5)
- Andy Maize – vocals (9)
- Jeff Tweedy – guitar, vocals (8)
- Jay Bennett – banjo, piano, vocals (8)
- Sarah Harmer – vocals (1, 2, 10)

Production

- Jim Cuddy – production
- John Whynot – production, recording, mixing
- Rafa Sardina – mixing assistance
- Mike Scotella – mixing assistance
- Greg Calbi – mastering

== Chart performance ==
Chart (1998)	Peak position
Canadian RPM Top Albums	38
