= Ignyte Award for Outstanding Fiction Podcast =

Annual award for speculative fiction

- Awarded for: Podcasts which produce, host, or perform original fiction as at least 75% of their annual output
- Country: United States
- Presented by: FIYAH Literary Magazine
- First award: 2020; 6 years ago
- Most recent winner: khōréō
- Website: ignyteawards.fiyahlitmag.com

The Ignyte Award for Outstanding Fiction Podcast is a podcasting award given annually as part of the Ignyte Awards.

== Winners and finalists ==
* Winners

Year	Work	Artist(s)	Ref.
2020	LeVar Burton Reads*	LeVar Burton, Julia Smith, Adam Deibert, Brendan Byrnes, Mischa Stanton, Kristen Torres, Jenny Radelet, Josephine Martorana, & Chris Bannon	
2020	Obsidian Podcast	Adetola Abdulkadir & Safiyah Cheatam	
2020	PodCastle	Jen R. Albert, Cherae Clark, Khaalidah Muhammad-Ali, Setsu Uzume, & Peter Adrian Behravesh	
2020	Beneath Ceaseless Skies	Scott H. Andrews	
2020	Nightlight Podcast	Tonia Thompson	
2021	Nightlight Podcast*	Tonia Ransom	
2021	PodCastle	Jen R. Albert, Cherae Clark, Khaalidah Muhammad-Ali, Setsu Uzume, & Peter Adrian Behravesh	
2021	Beneath Ceaseless Skies	Scott H. Andrews	
2021	Escape Pod	Mur Lafferty, S. B. Divya, Benjamin C. Kinney, Tina Connolly, Alasdair Stuart, Summer Brooks, Adam Pracht, & the entire Escape Pod team	
2021	The Magnus Archives	Jonathan Sims, Alexander J. Newall, Lowri Ann Davies, & Rusty Quill	
2022	khōréō*	—	
2022	Escape Pod	—	
2022	Gallery of Curiosities	—	
2022	PodCastle	—	
2022	PseudoPod	—	
2023	Black Women Are Scary*	—	
2023	Beneath Ceaseless Skies	—	
2023	Good Morning Antioch	—	
2023	PodCastle	—	
2023	PseudoPod	—	
2024	LeVar Burton Reads*	LeVar Burton	
2024	Cast of Wonders	The CoW Team	
2024	Old Gods of Appalachia	Steve Shell & Cam Collins	
2024	PodCastle	The PodCastle Team	
2024	Simultaneous Times Podcast	Space Cowboy Books	
2025	PodCastle*	—	
2025	Cast of Wonders	—	
2025	khōréō	—	
2025	PseudoPod	—	
2025	The NoSleep Podcast	—	
2026	khōréō*	—	
2026	Beneath Ceaseless Skies	—	
2026	Escape Pod	—	
2026	Lightspeed	—	
2026	Nightmare	—	
