= British Fantasy Award for Best Audio =

British literary award

- Awarded for: Spoken word audio work (e.g. audiobook, radio drama, podcast) performed by one or more participants
- Country: United Kingdom
- Presented by: British Fantasy Society
- First award: 2018; 8 years ago
- Most recent winner: The Shape of Monsters (fiction); The Folklore Podcast (non-fiction)
- Website: britishfantasysociety.org

The British Fantasy Award for Best Audio is a literary award given annually as part of the British Fantasy Awards since 2018. In 2026 the category was split into two distinct awards, one for audio fiction (covering both audiobooks and fiction podcasts) and one for non-fiction.

== Winners and shortlists ==
=== All Audio - 2018-2025 ===
* Winners

Year	Work	Author / Narrator / Director	Ref.
2018	Anansi Boys*	Neil Gaiman (author)	
2018	Anansi Boys*	Dirk Maggs (adaptor)	
2018	Brave New Words	Ed Fortune	
2018	Brave New Words	Starburst Magazine	
2018	Breaking the Glass Slipper	Lucy Hounsom	
2018	Breaking the Glass Slipper	Charlotte Bond	
2018	Breaking the Glass Slipper	Megan Leigh	
2018	Ivory Towers	Richard H. Brooks	
2018	Ivory Towers	Karim Kronfli	
2018	Pseudopod	Alasdair Stuart	
2018	Pseudopod	Escape Artists	
2018	Tea & Jeopardy	Emma Newman	
2018	Tea & Jeopardy	Peter Newman	
2019	Breaking the Glass Slipper*	—	
2019	Bedtime Stories for the End of the World	—	
2019	Blood on Satan's Claw	Mark Morris	
2019	PodCastle	—	
2019	PseudoPod	—	
2020	PodCastle*	—	
2020	Breaking the Glass Slipper	—	
2020	Pseudopod	—	
2020	Speculative Spaces	—	
2021	The Magnus Archives*		
2021	Breaking the Glass Slipper	Lucy Hounsom	
2021	Breaking the Glass Slipper	Charlotte Bond	
2021	Breaking the Glass Slipper	Megan Leigh	
2021	PodCastle	—	
2021	PseudoPod	—	
2021	The Sandman	Dirk Maggs	
2021	The Sandman	Neil Gaiman	
2021	Stellar Firma		
2022	Monstrous Agonies*	H. R. Owen	
2022	Breaking the Glass Slipper	Lucy Hounsom	
2022	Breaking the Glass Slipper	Charlotte Bond	
2022	Breaking the Glass Slipper	Megan Leigh	
2022	Daughter of Fire and Water	Lyndsey Croal	
2022	PodCastle	Escape Artists	
2022	Pseudopod	Escape Artists	
2023	The Stranger Times*	C. K. McDonnell	
2023	Breaking the Glass Slipper	Lucy Hounsom	
2023	Breaking the Glass Slipper	Charlotte Bond	
2023	Breaking the Glass Slipper	Megan Leigh	
2023	The Painkiller Podcast	Bitter Pill Theatre	
2023	PodCastle	Escape Artists	
2023	Pseudopod	Escape Artists	
2023	The Secret of St. Kilda	Michael Ireland	
2023	The Secret of St. Kilda	Naomi Clarke	
2024	The Tiny Bookcase*	—	
2024	Cast of Wonders	—	
2024	The Penumbra Podcast	—	
2024	PodCastle	—	
2024	Pseudopod	—	
2024	Simultaneous Times Podcast	—	
2025	Breaking the Glass Slipper*	—	
2025	PodCastle	—	
2025	The Tiny Bookcase	—	
2025	Pseudopod	—	

=== Audio (fiction) - 2026 on ===
Year	Work	Author / Narrator / Director	Ref.
2026	The Shape of Monsters	CL Hellisen* (Writer)	
2026	The Shape of Monsters	Omari Douglas* (Narrator)	
2026	The Tiny Bookcase	—	
2026	Podcastle	—	
2026	Pseudopod	—	

=== Audio (non-fiction) - 2026 on ===
Year	Work	Author / Narrator / Director	Ref.
2026	The Folklore Podcast		
2026	Breaking The Glass Slipper		
2026	Fantasy Book Swap		
2026	Uncanny	Danny Robins	
