= Mur Lafferty =

American podcaster and writer

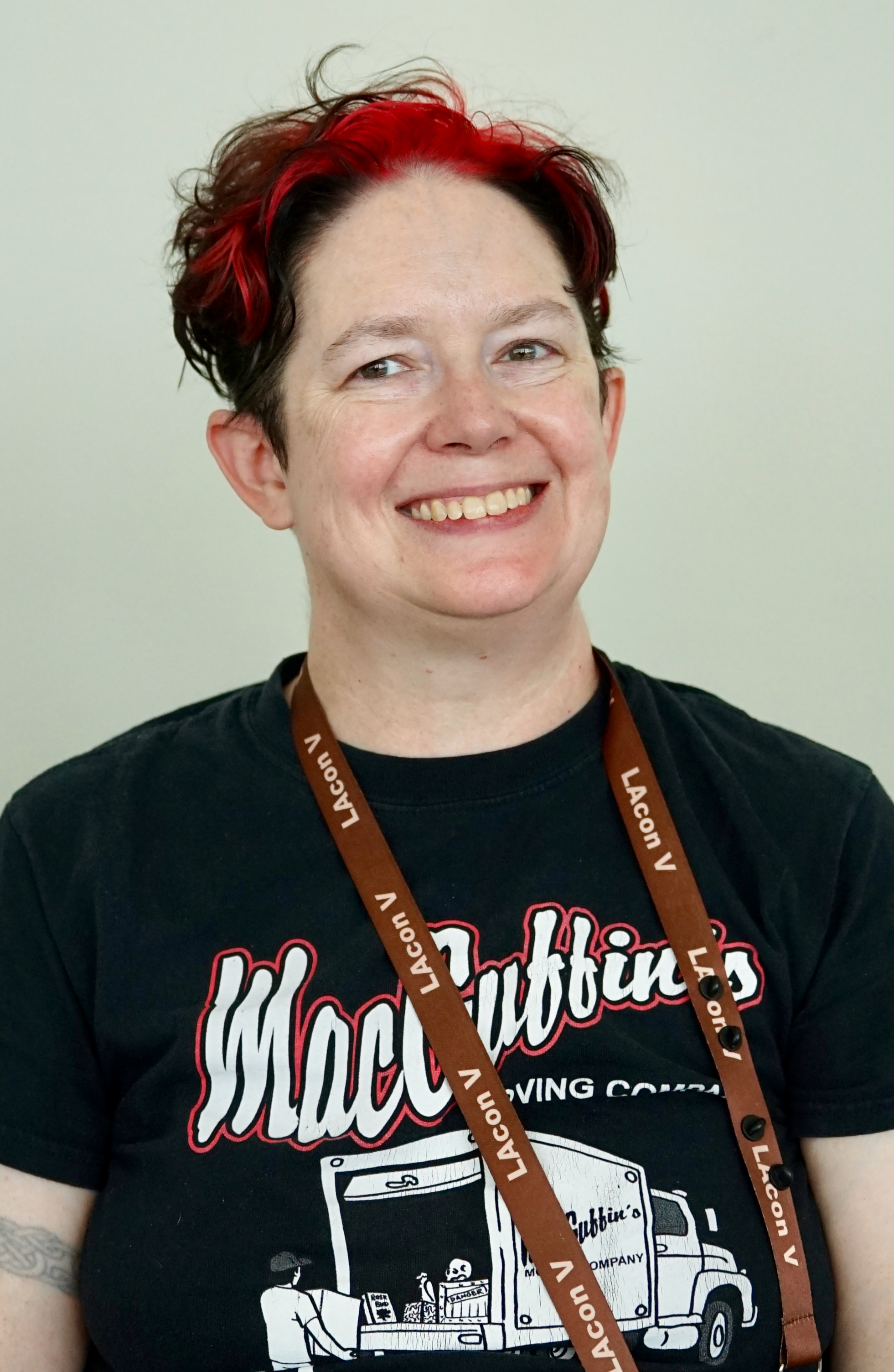
- Lafferty at Worldcon 2026
- Born: July 25, 1973 (age 53)
- Occupation: Author
- Writing career
- Genre: Science fiction/Fantasy/Mystery
- Website: www.murverse.com

Mur Lafferty (born July 25, 1973) is an American podcaster and writer based in Durham, North Carolina. She was the editor and host of Escape Pod from 2010, when she took over from Serah Eley, until 2012, when she was replaced by Norm Sherman. She is also the host and creator of the podcast I Should Be Writing. Until July 2007, she was host and co-editor of Pseudopod. She was the editor-in-chief of the Escape Artists short fiction magazine Mothership Zeta until it went on hiatus in 2016.

== Education ==
Lafferty attended the University of North Carolina at Chapel Hill and graduated with a degree in English. In 2014, she received her MFA from the University of Maine's Stonecoast program.

== Podcasting ==
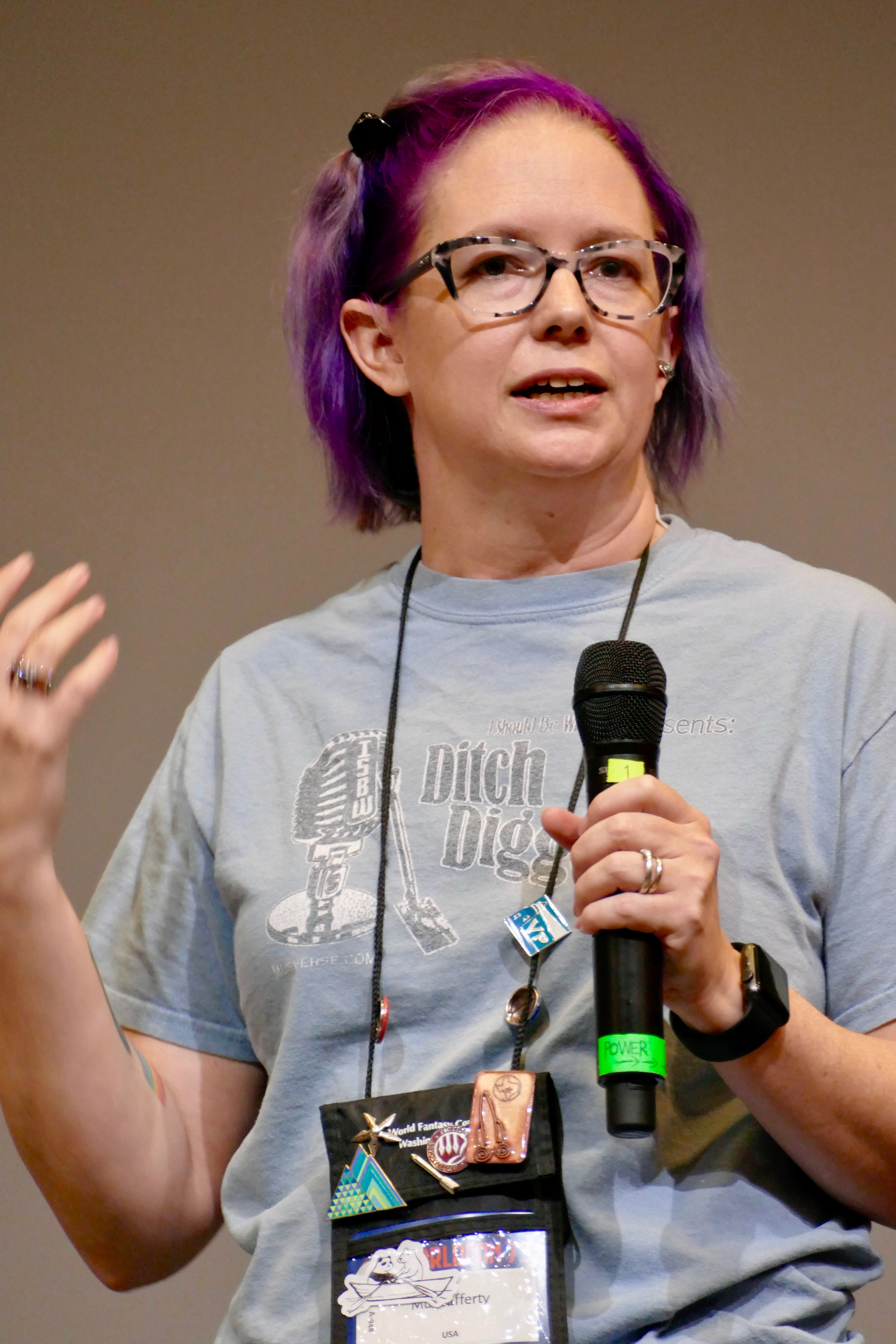
Lafferty performing a live episode of the Ditch Diggers podcast at the 2017 Worldcon.

=== Early contributions ===
A friend introduced Lafferty to podcasting in October 2004. She immediately seized on the medium as a novel opportunity to publish her essays on geekdom. Her first podcast, Geek Fu Action Grip, launched in December 2004. Early topics included her obsession with Alton Brown and her uncomfortable crushes on the hosts of her child's TV shows, and expanded to discussions of games, movies, and television shows. In later episodes, she began podcasting her fiction, most notably her serialized novels Heaven and Heaven Part 2: Hell. Geek Fu Action Grip ceased production as of episode 103.

Lafferty's essays also led to her becoming an early contributor to Dragon Page Wingin' It: a sci-fi variety show podcast hosted by Michael R. Mennenga and Evo Terra. While she is no longer a regular, her essay produced during their 2006 Dragon*Con show is considered one of her best.

In September 2006, Lafferty, along with Michael R. Mennenga and Tracy Hickman, founded the Parsec Awards, which recognize excellence in science fiction podcasting. After a general nomination period, the Steering Committee compiles a shortlist, from which an independent panel of judges selects the winner of each category. The awards are presented yearly at Dragon*Con.

=== I Should Be Writing ===
Lafferty's second podcast arose from her desire to share her experiences as a struggling fiction writer. I Should Be Writing is a self-described "podcast for wannabe fiction writers." Each show covers a specific topic about the writing world, from battling self-doubt to crafting queries and cover letters, interspersed with interviews with published professionals. I Should Be Writing won the 2007 Parsec Award for Best Writing Podcast.

=== Escape Pod and Pseudopod ===
From May 2010 to December 2012, she was the editor and host of the sci-fi podcast magazine Escape Pod, taking over from former editor and founder Steve Eley. Under her editorship, Escape Pod began paying SFWA pro rates for the first time.

Lafferty was also co-founder, along with Steve Eley and co-editor Ben Phillips, of Pseudopod, a spin-off of Escape Pod presenting "the best in audio horror." In July 2007, she stepped down as co-editor of Pseudopod.

=== Ditch Diggers ===
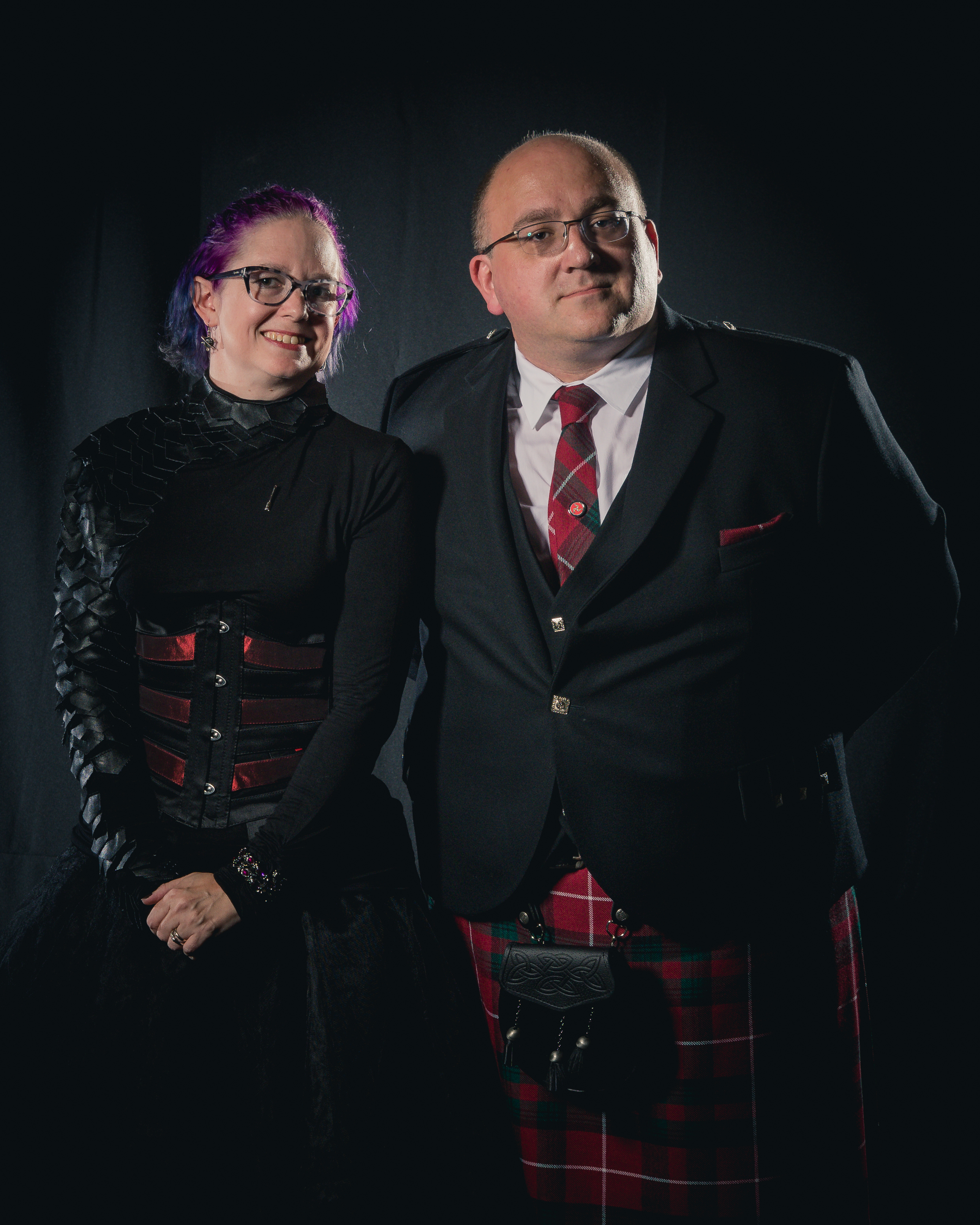
Mur Lafferty and Alasdair Stuart prior to the Hugo Awards ceremony in 2017.

In January 2015, Lafferty started a new podcast with a recurring I Should Be Writing guest host Matt Wallace. The new show, titled Ditch Diggers, focuses on the professional and business side of writing and is intended to be honest to the point of brutality, in contrast to the more optimistic and uplifting tone of I Should Be Writing. It won the Hugo Award for Best Fancast in 2018, having been a finalist the year before.

== Writing ==
Lafferty's early career began with her writing for White Wolf and other role-playing game companies, and she has expanded to writing about games for such publications as Scrye, Knights of the Dinner Table, Anime Insider, Games Quarterly, and The Escapist. Her podcast novel Playing For Keeps was published by Swarm Press on August 25, 2008.

She has also written essays for the online magazine Grumble, many of which have ended up on Geek Fu Action Grip, and published fiction in Hub magazine. Her short story "1963: The Argument Against Louis Pasteur" (published in The Thackery T. Lambshead Cabinet of Curiosities) qualified her for the John W. Campbell Award for Best New Writer, which she won in 2013.

In May 2013, Orbit Books released the first in Lafferty's urban fantasy series The Shambling Guides with The Shambling Guide to New York City. It received a favorable reception; Kirkus Reviews stated: "The hip, knowing and sometimes hysterically funny narrative, interspersed with excerpts from the guide of the title, lurches along in splendid fashion… The result is irresistible." The second novel in the series, A Ghost Train to New Orleans, was published on March 4, 2014.

More recently, Lafferty has published the multiple-award nominated science fiction mystery Six Wakes (2017), and an unrelated series of science fiction mysteries, The Midsolar Murders, consisting of Station Eternity (2022), Chaos Terminal (2023), and Infinite Archive (2025).

== Selected bibliography ==
=== Novels ===
- Playing for Keeps (2007, Podiobooks.com)
- Playing for Keeps (2008, Swarm Press; ISBN 978-1934861165)
- Nanovor: Hacked (2010, Running Press Kids)
- Six Wakes (2017, Orbit Books; ISBN 978-0316389686)
- Solo: A Star Wars Story: Expanded Edition (film novelization; 2018, Del Rey; ISBN 978-0525619390)
- Minecraft: The Lost Journals (2019, Random House Worlds; ISBN 978-0399180699)

==== The Shambling Guides ====
- A Shambling Guide to New York (2013, Orbit Books; ISBN 978-0316221177)
- The Ghost Train to New Orleans (2014, Orbit Books; ISBN 978-0316221146)

==== The Midsolar Murders ====
- Station Eternity (2022, Ace; ISBN 978-0593098110)
- Chaos Terminal (2023, Ace)
- Infinite Archive (2025, ACE)

=== Novellas ===
- Heaven - Season One (2006, Podiobooks.com)
- Heaven - Season Two: Hell (2007, Podiobooks.com)
- Heaven - Season Three: Earth (2007, Podiobooks.com)
- Heaven - Season Four: Wasteland (2007, Podiobooks.com)
- Heaven - Season Five: War (2009, Podiobooks.com)
- Marco and the Red Granny (2010, Hub Magazine)

=== Short fiction ===
- "I Look Forward to Remembering You" (2006, Escape Pod)
- "1963: The Argument Against Louis Pasteur", The Thackery T. Lambshead Cabinet of Curiosities (ed. Ann and Jeff VanderMeer)
- "Produce 1:1-10" (2014, Daily Science Fiction)

=== Serial fiction ===
- Bookburners (created by Max Gladstone)
  - Bookburners Season One (with Gladstone, Margaret Dunlap, and Brian Francis Slattery)
    - Episode 4: "A Sorcerer's Apprentice" (2015)
    - Episode 8: "Under My Skin" (2015)
    - Episode 11: "Shore Leave" (2015)
    - Episode 13: "Keeping Friends Close" (2015)

=== Anthologies ===
- Voices: New Media Fiction (editor; 2006, Podiobooks.com)

=== Non-fiction and essays ===
- Tricks of the Podcasting Masters (with Robert Walch) Que 2006 ISBN 0-7897-3574-1
- Lessons From a Geek Fu Master, (2006, Lulu)

=== Role-playing games ===
- Warcraft: The Roleplaying Game (2003, Sword & Sorcery Studios)
- D20 Fright Night Haunted School (2004, Hogshead Publishing)

=== Magazines ===
- Mothership Zeta (2015–2016, Escape Artists; editor-in-chief)

== Awards and honors ==
- Member of the Podcast Pickle Hall of Fame
- 2006 – One of the Top Ten Savvy Women in Podcasting
- 2006 – Tricks of the Podcasting Masters was named one of the top reference books for 2006 by Amazon.com.
- 2007 – Parsec Award nomination for Best Speculative Fiction Story (Short Form): I Look Forward To Remembering You
- 2007 – Parsec Award for Best Writing Related Podcast: I Should Be Writing
- 2008 – Parsec Award for Best Speculative Fiction Story (Novella Form): Heaven – Season Four: Wasteland
- 2008 – Parsec Award for Best Speculative Fiction Story (Long Form): Playing for Keeps
- 2010 – Parsec Award nomination for Best Speculative Fiction Story (Novella Form): Heaven – Season Five: War
- 2011 – Parsec Award nomination for Best Speculative Fiction Story (Novella Form): Marco and the Red Granny
- 2012 – nomination for John W. Campbell Award for Best New Writer
- 2013 – John W. Campbell Award for Best New Writer
- 2014 – Manly Wade Wellman Award for The Shambling Guide to New York City
- 2015 – Manly Wade Wellman Award for Ghost Train to New Orleans
- 2018 – nomination for Hugo Award for Best SemiProzine as editor of Escape Pod (repeated 2020–2025)
- 2018 – nominated for Hugo Award for Best Novel for Six Wakes
