= Parsec Awards =

Set of awards for science fiction podcasts

The Parsec Awards were a set of annual awards created to recognize excellence in science fiction podcasts and podcast novels. The awards were created by Mur Lafferty, Tracy Hickman and Michael R. Mennenga and awarded by FarPoint Media. They were first presented in 2006 at DragonCon. In 2009 the awards were described as "one of the most recognizable honors in science and fiction podcasting". The awards were given from 2006 to 2018.

Nominations were accepted from the listening public annually in each of the categories. The list was vetted for eligibility by the steering committee before producers were invited to submit samples of work for consideration by a panel of judges. The panel reduced the list of nominees to five finalists in each category. The finalists' work was submitted for judging and the winner was selected by that panel of authors, podcasters, and others knowledgeable in the field of speculative fiction, podcasting, and/or publishing. Past finalist judges have included Catherine Asaro, Charles de Lint, Cory Doctorow, and Evo Terra.

The awards were last presented in 2018.

== Winners ==
2018
Category	Winner	Creator	Ref.
Best Speculative Fiction Audio Drama (Long Form)	Uncanny County	Todd Faulkner, Alison Crane, William Franke, Nicole Greevy, and Jessica Walker	
Best Speculative Fiction Audio Drama (Short Form)	The Axe and Crown	Eli McIlveen and Sean Howard	
Best Speculative Fiction Story: Large Cast (Short Form)	"Buddies for Hire", The Gray Area	Edward Champion	
Best Speculative Fiction Story: Small Cast (Long Form)	Derelict: Tomb	Paul E. Cooley (Shadow Publications)	
Best Speculative Fiction Story: Small Cast (Short Form)	"Six Jobs", PodCastle	Tim Pratt	
Best Speculative Fiction Magazine or Anthology Podcast	Escape Pod		
Best Fact Behind the Fiction Podcast	Astronomy Cast		
Best Speculative Fiction Fan or News Podcast (General)	Kalanadi		
Best Speculative Fiction Fan or News Podcast (Specific)	To the Journey!		
Best Podcast about Speculative Fiction Content Creation	Under the Puppet		
Best Speculative Fiction Video Story	Active Radioactive Radio		
Best New Speculative Fiction Podcaster or Team	The Phenomenon		
Best Speculative Fiction Comedy or Parody Podcast	Robotz of the Company		

2017
Category	Winner	Creator	Ref.
Best Speculative Fiction Comedy or Parody Podcast	Star Wars Best in Galaxy (Season 3)	Mark Restuccia and Patch Hyde	
Best Podcast about Speculative Fiction Content Creation	Calliope Writing Coach Podcast	Angie Fenimore and Michael Sheen (Dandelion Productions)	
Best Speculative Fiction Fan or News Podcast (Specific)	Aggressive Negotiations: A Star Wars Podcast	John Mills and Matt Rushing	
Best Speculative Fiction Magazine or Anthology Podcast	The Theatre of Tomorrow	Travis McMaster and Mark Whitten	
Best Speculative Fiction Fan or News Podcast (General)	The Faculty of Horror	Andrea Subissati and Alexandra West	
Best Fact Behind the Fiction Podcast	Talk Nerdy with Cara Santa Maria	Cara Santa Maria	
Best Speculative Fiction Video Story	The Uncle Interloper Show	Grant Baciocco	
Best New Speculative Fiction Podcaster or Team	MarsCorp	Definitely Human	
Best Speculative Fiction Audio Drama (Long Form)	Uncanny County	Todd Faulkner, Alison Crane, and Nicole Greevy	
Best Speculative Fiction Story: Large Cast (Short Form)	"Genie", Return Home	Maia Brown-Jackson	
Best Speculative Fiction Story: Small Cast (Long Form)	"Things Unseen", The Raven and the Writing Desk	Chris Lester	
Best Speculative Fiction Story: Small Cast (Short Form)	"Shadows", The Wicked Library	K. B. Goddard	
Best Speculative Fiction Story: Small Cast (Novella Form)	Six Stories, Told at Night	K. T. Bryski	
Best Speculative Fiction Audio Drama (Short Form)	"Woods Ferry", Campfire Radio Theater	John Ballentine	

2016
Category	Winner	Creator	Ref.
Best Speculative Fiction Comedy or Parody Podcast	"The Voyages of the USS Sisyphus", Improvised Star Trek	Christopher Rathjen	
Best Podcast about Speculative Fiction Content Creation	The Journeyman Writer	Alastair Stephens	
Best Speculative Fiction Fan or News Podcast (Specific)	Verity!	Deborah Stanish, Erika Ensign, Katrina Griffiths, L. M. Myles, Lynne M. Thomas, and Tansy Rayner Roberts	
Best Speculative Fiction Magazine or Anthology Podcast	The Uncanny Magazine Podcast	Lynne M. Thomas, Michael Damian Thomas, Erika Ensign, and Steven Schapansky	
Best Speculative Fiction Fan or News Podcast (General)	The Incomparable	Jason Snell	
Best Fact Behind the Fiction Podcast	Universe Today's Guide to Space	Fraser Cain	
Best Speculative Fiction Video Story	The Ultimate Nerd-ament	Grant Baciocco and Russ Walko	
Best New Speculative Fiction Podcaster or Team	Uncanny County	Todd Faulkner and Alison Crane	
Best Speculative Fiction Audio Drama (Long Form)	Uncanny County	Todd Faulkner and Alison Crane	
Best Speculative Fiction Story: Large Cast (Long Form)	"Property Damage Claim #1-1403986", Reading Out Loud	Ryan P. Duke	
Best Speculative Fiction Story: Small Cast (Long Form)	After the Plague	Mike Bennett	
Best Speculative Fiction Story: Small Cast (Short Form)	"Graves", Tales to Terrify	Justin Cawthorne	
Best Speculative Fiction Audio Drama (Short Form)	"Balance of Darkness", The Galaxy Quest Restoration Project	David A. Mackenzie	
Best Speculative Fiction Story: Large Cast (Short Form)	"Oddfellows Local", The Voice of Free Planet X	Jared Axelrod	

2015
Category	Winner	Creator	Ref.
Best Speculative Fiction Audio Drama (Long Form)	"The Sinister Secret of StarNasty" or "A Mike in the Mechanics", Hadron Gospel Hour	Michael McQuilkin and Richard Wentworth	
Best Speculative Fiction Audio Drama (Short Form)	Aaron's World	Mike Meraz and Aaron Meraz	
Best Podcast about Speculative Fiction Content Creation	The Journeyman Writer		
Best Speculative Fiction Comedy or Parody Podcast	[1] New Message		
Best Fact Behind the Fiction Podcast	Universe Today's Guide to Space		
Best Speculative Fiction Fan or News Podcast (General)	The Incomparable		
Best Speculative Fiction Fan or News Podcast (Specific)	The Scot and the Sassenach		
Best Speculative Fiction Story: Large Cast (Short Form)	"Last Contact", The Dunesteef Audio Fiction Magazine	Rish Outfield and Bigg Anklevich	
Best Speculative Fiction Magazine or Anthology Podcast	Seminar		
Best New Speculative Fiction Podcaster or Team	PleasureTown		
Best Speculative Fiction Story: Small Cast (Novella and Long Form)	The Black		
Best Speculative Fiction Story: Small Cast (Short Form)	"O'Malley’s Media Storm", Seminar	V. C. Morrison	
Best Speculative Fiction Video Story	Mario Warfare		

2014
Category	Winner	Creator	Ref.
Best Speculative Fiction Story: Small Cast (Short Form)	"Growth Spurt", Pseudopod	Paul Lorello	
Best Speculative Fiction Story: Small Cast (Novella Form)	"Blood and Smoke", Underwood and Flinch	Mike Bennett	
Best Speculative Fiction Story: Large Cast (Short Form)	"Dirty Hands", Seminar: An Original Anthology Show	Niall Kitson	
Best Speculative Fiction Story: Long Form	Fire on the Mound	William J. Meyer	
Best Speculative Fiction Audio Drama (Short Form)	"Tallington", We Are Not Alone	Jon Thrower	
Best Speculative Fiction Audio Drama (Long Form)	We're Alive: A Story of Survival	Kc Wayland	
Best Speculative Fiction Video Story	Once Upon a Time in the 1970s	Chris and Anne Lukeman	
Best Speculative Fiction Magazine or Anthology Podcast	The NoSleep Podcast	David Cummings	
Best New Speculative Fiction Podcaster or Team	Hadron Gospel Hour	Richard Wentworth, Michael McQuilkin, Lisa McQuilkin, and Michael Atkinson	
Best Speculative Fiction Fan or News Podcast (Specific)	Cyborgs: A Bionic Podcast	John S. Drew and Paul K. Bisson	
Best Speculative Fiction Fan or News Podcast (General)	Sword & Laser	Veronica Belmont and Tom Merritt	
Best Podcast about Speculative Fiction Content Creation	StoryWonk Sunday	Lani Diane Rich and Alastair Stephens	
Best Fact Behind the Fiction Podcast	Universe Today's Guide to Space	Fraser Cain	
Best Speculative Fiction Comedy or Parody Podcast	DragonConTV	Brian Richardson, Stephen Granade, Alex White, Chris Lloyd, Tommy Byrd, Patrick Freeman, and Rachel Pendergrass	

2013
Category	Winner	Creator	Ref.
Best Speculative Fiction Story: Small Cast (Short Form)	"Now Cydonia", Cast of Wonders	Rick Kennett	
Best Speculative Fiction Story: Small Cast (Novella Form)	The Shadow Over Innsmouth by H.P. Lovecraft	Mike Bennett	
Best Speculative Fiction Story: Small Cast (Long Form)	Underwood and Flinch	Mike Bennett	
Best Speculative Fiction Story: Large Cast	"The Road To Utopia Plain", The Dunesteef Audio Fiction Magazine	Rick Kennett	
Best Speculative Fiction Audio Drama (Short Form)	The Minister of Chance	Radio Static	
Best Speculative Fiction Audio Drama (Long Form)	Star Trek: Outpost	Tony Raymond and Daniel McIntosh	
Best Speculative Fiction Video Story	I Have Your Heart	Molly Crabapple, Kim Boekbinder, and Jim Batt	
Best Speculative Fiction Magazine or Anthology Podcast	Tales from the Archives, Volume 2	Tee Morris and Pip Ballantine	
Best New Speculative Fiction Podcaster or Team	The NoSleep Podcast	David Cummings	
Best Speculative Fiction Fan or News Podcast (Specific)	RebelForce Radio	Jimmy Mac and Jason Swank	
Best Speculative Fiction Fan or News Podcast (General)	Nights at the Round Table	Ash Farbrother	
Best Podcast about Speculative Fiction Content Creation	StoryForward	J. C. Hutchins and Steve Peters	
Best Fact Behind the Fiction Podcast	Hubblecast	Oli Usher and Joe Liske	
Best Speculative Fiction Comedy or Parody Podcast	Blastropodcast	Mark Soloff	
Best Speculative Fiction Music Podcast	The Funny Music Project	Devo Spice	

2012
Category	Winner	Creator	Ref.
Best Speculative Fiction Story: Small Cast (Short Form)	"Precarious Child", The Ministry of Peculiar Occurrences	Pip Ballantine	
Best Speculative Fiction Story: Small Cast (Long Form)	Underwood and Flinch: A Vampire Novel	Mike Bennett	
Best Speculative Fiction Story: Large Cast	"The Seven", The Ministry of Peculiar Occurrences	P. C. Haring	
Best Speculative Fiction Audio Drama (Short Form)	Keeg's Quest: A Skyrim Adventure	Rich Matheson	
Best Speculative Fiction Audio Drama (Long Form)	The Mask of Inanna	Alicia Goranson	
Best Speculative Fiction Magazine or Anthology Podcast	Drabblecast		
Best New Speculative Fiction Podcaster or Team	Toasted Cake	Tina Connolly	
Best Speculative Fiction Fan or News Podcast (Specific)	The Signal		
Best Speculative Fiction Fan or News Podcast (General)	The Incomparable		
Best Podcast about Speculative Fiction Content Creation	Writing Excuses	Brandon Sanderson, Dan Wells, Eric James Stone, Howard Tayler, and Stacy Whitman	
Best Fact Behind the Fiction Podcast	MonsterTalk		
Best Speculative Fiction Comedy or Parody Podcast	Supervillain Corner		
Best Speculative Fiction Music Podcast	Radio Free Hipster		

2011
Category	Winner	Creator	Ref.
Best Speculative Fiction Story (Short Form)	Saying the Names	Maggie Clark	
Best Speculative Fiction Story (Novella Form)	Kissyman & the Gentleman	Scott Sigler	
Best Speculative Fiction Story (Long Form)	Owner's Share	Nathan Lowell	
Best Speculative Fiction Audio Drama (Short Form)	The Radio Adventures of Dr. Floyd	Grant Baciocco and Doug Price	
Best Speculative Fiction Audio Drama (Long Form)	HG World	Jay Smith	
Best Speculative Fiction Video Story	Grant's Advent Calendar Video Podcast		
Best Speculative Fiction Magazine or Anthology Podcast	Drabblecast		
Best New Speculative Fiction Podcaster or Team	Cobalt City Adventures Unlimited		
Best Speculative Fiction Fan or News Podcast (Specific)	PodCulture: TARDIS Interruptus		
Best Speculative Fiction Fan or News Podcast (General)	WhatTheCast		
Best Podcast about Speculative Fiction Content Creation	Fullcast Podcast		
Best Fact Behind the Fiction Podcast	Planetary Radio		
Best Speculative Fiction Comedy or Parody Podcast	Technorama		
Best Speculative Fiction Music Podcast	Renaissance Festival Podcast		
Best Youth-Driven Speculative Fiction Podcast	Aaron's World		

2010
Category	Winner	Creator	Ref.
Best Speculative Fiction Story (Short Form)	The Tank	Scott Sigler	
Best Speculative Fiction Story (Novella Form)	Personal Effects: Sword of Blood	J. C. Hutchins	
Best Speculative Fiction Story (Long Form)	Captain's Share	Nathan Lowell	
Best Speculative Fiction Audio Drama (Short Form)	"Whispers in the Wood", The Metamor City Podcast	Chris Lester	
Best Speculative Fiction Audio Drama (Long Form)	Decoder Ring Theatre	Gregg Taylor	
Best Speculative Fiction Video Story	GOLD (Season 1)	David Nett and Andrew R. Deutsch	
Best Speculative Fiction Magazine or Anthology Podcast	The Drabblecast	Norm Sherman	
Best New Speculative Fiction Podcaster or Team	In The Gloaming	Nathaniel Tapley	
Best Speculative Fiction Fan or News Podcast (Specific)	The Signal	Kari Haley, Kevin Bachelder, Kara Helgren, Les Howard, Jutta Jordans, Dave Tomasic, Andy King, Nick Edwards, Miranda Thomas, Helen Eaton, Anna Snyder, James Parkinson, and Jill Arroway	
Best Speculative Fiction Fan or News Podcast (General)	Galactic Watercooler	Audra, Chuck, and Sean	
Best Podcast about Speculative Fiction Content Creation	Writing Excuses	Brandon Sanderson, Dan Wells, Eric James Stone, Howard Tayler, and Stacy Whitman	
Best Fact Behind the Fiction Podcast	Skeptoid	Brian Dunning	
Best Speculative Fiction Comedy or Parody Podcast	Teknikal Diffikulties	Cayenne Chris Conroy	
Best Speculative Fiction Music Podcast	Radio Free Hipster	Z.	

2009
Category	Winner	Creator	Ref.
Best Speculative Fiction Story (Short Form)	"Under The Bed", Variant Frequencies	Michael Natale	
Best Speculative Fiction Story (Novella Form)	"7th Son: Obsidion", Eusocial Networking	Scott Sigler	
Best Speculative Fiction Story (Long Form / Novel)	FETIDUS: The Foundation for the Ethical Treatment of the Innocently Damned, Undead and Supernatural	James Durham	
Best Speculative Fiction Audio Drama (Short Form including Independents)	The Radio Adventures of Dr. Floyd	Grant Baciocco and Doug Price	
Best Speculative Fiction Audio Drama (Long Form including Independents)	"Making the Cut", The Metamor City Podcast	Chris Lester	
Best Speculative Fiction Magazine or Anthology Podcast	Pseudopod	Ben Phillips and Alasdair Stuart	
Best Speculative Fiction Video Podcast	Stranger Things	Earl Newton, David Kanter, and Cody P. Christian	
Best Speculative Fiction Comedy or Parody Podcast	Bell's in the Batfry	John Bell	
Best Speculative Fiction Writing-related Podcast	Writing Excuses	Brandon Sanderson, Howard Tayler, and Dan Wells	
Best Speculative Fiction Fan Podcast	The ScapeCast	Brent Barrett, Chris Polansky, Hank Shiffman, Kevin Bachelder, Kimberly Thompson, Lindy Rae, Michael Falkner, Sammy Mohr, and Wendy Hembrock	
Best Speculative Fiction News Podcast	(Cool) Shite on the Tube	Bruce Moyle, Chris Rattray, David Quinn, Dion Brooks, and Tiarne Double	
Best Gaming Podcast	Brilliant Gameologists	Josh, Meg, Zeke, and Tom	
Best Speculative Fiction Infotainment Podcast	365 Days of Astronomy	International Year of Astronomy	
Best Speculative Fiction Music Podcast	The FuMP	Devo Spice, Possible Oscar, Raymond and Scum, Rob Balder, Robert Lund, and Spaff.com, the great Luke Ski, Tom Smith, and Worm Quartet	
Best Anime Podcast	Anime World Order		
Best New Speculative Fiction Podcaster/Team	FETIDUS	James Durham	

2008
Category	Winner	Creator	Ref.
Best Speculative Fiction Story (Short Form)	Red Man	Scott Sigler	
Best Speculative Fiction Story (Novella Form)	"Wasteland", Heaven (Season Four)	Mur Lafferty	
Best Speculative Fiction Story (Long Form)	Playing for Keeps	Mur Lafferty	
Best Speculative Fiction Audio Drama (Short Form including Independents)	Space Casey	Christiana Ellis	
Best Speculative Fiction Audio Drama (Long Form including Independents)	Billibub Baddings and the Case of the Singing Sword	Tee Morris	
Best Speculative Fiction Video Podcast	Stranger Things		
Best Speculative Fiction Magazine or Anthology Podcast	Variant Frequencies		
Best Speculative Fiction Comedy or Parody Podcast	Short Cummings Audio		
Best Speculative Fiction Fan Podcast	Galactica Quorum		
Best Speculative Fiction News Podcast	Slice of SciFi		
Best Writing-related Podcast	Adventures in Scifi Publishing		
Best "Infotainment" Cast	The Weird Show		
Best Gaming Podcast	The Game Kennel		

2007
Category	Winner	Creator	Ref.
Best Speculative Fiction Story (Short Form)	"No World for Warriors", Variant Frequencies	Matt Wallace	
Best Speculative Fiction Story (Novella Form)	The Arwen	Timothy P. Callahan	
Best Speculative Fiction Story (Novel Form)	The Immortals	Tracy Hickman	
Best Audio Drama (Short Form including Independents)	The Radio Adventures of Dr. Floyd	Grant Baciocco and Doug Price	
Best Audio Drama (Long Form including Independents)	Prometheus Radio Theatre	Steven H. Wilson and Scott D. Farquhar	
Best Audio Production	The Radio Adventures of Dr. Floyd	Grant Baciocco and Doug Price	
Best Video Production	Missing Pages	Jerome Olivier	
Best Video Podcast	Missing Pages	Jerome Olivier	
Best Non-Speculative Fiction	Number One with a Bullet	Mark Yoshimoto Nemcoff	
Best Fan Podcast	The Signal	Jill Arroway, Les Howard, and Kari Haley	
Best Speculative Fiction News Podcast	Skepticality	Derek Colanduno and Robynn McCarthy	
Best Anime Podcast	GeekNights Wednesdays: Anime Manga Comics	Rym and Scott	
Best Gaming Podcast	Pulp Gamer: Inside Track		
Best Graphic Literature Podcast	Comics Radar	J. M. Campbell and Matt Melnyk	
Best "Infotainment" Cast	Pulp Gamer: Out of Character		
Best Reality Podcast	Tag in the Seam	Leann	
Best Tech Podcast	The Command Line	Thomas Gideon	
Best Writing Related Podcast	I Should Be Writing	Mur Lafferty	

2006
Category	Winner	Creator	Ref.
Best Fiction (Short)	"Absolution Insured", Variant Frequencies	Matt Wallace	
Best Fiction (Long)	"How to Succeed in Evil", The Seanachai	Patrick McLean	
Best Audio Production	Virgin Falls	Jeff Folchinsky	
Best Writing Podcast	The Secrets	Michael A. Stackpole	
Best Audio Drama (Long)	"The Stargate Café", Planet Retcon		
Best Audio Drama (Short)	The Radio Adventures of Dr. Floyd	Grant Baciocco	
Best Fiction (Non-speculative)	"Death of A Dish Washer", The Seanachai	Patrick McLean	
Best Fan Podcast	The Scapecast	Kevin Bachelder and Lindy Rae	
Best News Podcast	The Future And You	Stephen Euin Cobb	
