= C. L. Clark =

American speculative fiction author

- Occupation: Author; editor
- Education: Indiana University Bloomington (MFA)
- Genre: Speculative fiction; fantasy
- Notable works: The Unbroken

Website
- clclarkwrites.com

Cherae Clark, also known under the pen name C. L. Clark, is an American author and editor of speculative fiction, a personal trainer, and an English teacher. She (Note: Clark uses she/her and they/them pronouns. She/her pronouns will be used in this article for consistency.) graduated from Indiana University with a MFA in creative writing and was a 2012 Lambda Literary Fellow. Her debut novel, The Unbroken, the first book of the Magic of the Lost trilogy, was published by Orbit Books in 2021. The Unbroken was a finalist for the 2021 Nebula Award for Best Novel, the 2022 Robert Holdstock Award for Best Fantasy Novel from the British Fantasy Awards, the 2022 Ignyte Award for Best Novel - Adult, and the 2022 Locus Award for Best First Novel. Clark edited, with series editor Charles Payseur, We're Here: The Best Queer Speculative Fiction of 2020, which won the 2022 Ignyte Award for Best Anthology/Collected Work and the 2022 Locus Award for Best Anthology.

== Education ==
C. L. Clark earned an MFA in creative writing from Indiana University Bloomington and was a 2012 Lambda Literary Fellow.

== Career ==
Clark's short fiction has appeared in numerous publications, including Beneath Ceaseless Skies, FIYAH Literary Magazine, Glitter + Ashes: Queer Tales of a World That Wouldn't Die, PodCastle, Tor.com, Uncanny, The Year's Best African Speculative Fiction, and The Best American Science Fiction and Fantasy (2022). Her short story "You Perfect, Broken Thing", published in Uncanny Magazine, won the 2021 Ignyte Award for Best Short Story.

Clark served as a co-editor of PodCastle from 2019 to 2021. With series editor Charles Payseur, Clark edited We're Here: The Best Queer Speculative Fiction 2020, an anthology of queer speculative fiction published by Neon Hemlock. We're Here won the 2022 Ignyte Award for Best Anthology/Collected Work and the 2022 Locus Award for Best Anthology.

Clark's debut novel, The Unbroken, was a finalist for the 2022 Ignyte Award for Best Novel - Adult, the 2021 Nebula Award for Best Novel, the 2022 Locus Award for Best First Novel, and the 2022 British Fantasy Society's Robert Holdstock Award for Best Fantasy Novel.

== Awards and nominations ==
Awards for Clark's writing
Year	Work	Award	Category	Result	Ref.
2021	The Unbroken	Goodreads Choice Award	Fantasy	Finalist	
2021	The Unbroken	Nebula Award	Best Novel	Finalist	
2021	"You Perfect, Broken Thing"	Ignyte Award	Short Story	Won	
2022	The Unbroken	British Fantasy Award	Fantasy Novel (Robert Holdstock Award)	Shortlisted	
2022	The Unbroken	Ignyte Award	Adult Novel	Finalist	
2022	The Unbroken	Locus Award	First Novel	Finalist	
2022	We're Here: The Best Queer Speculative Fiction 2020	Ignyte Award	Anthology/Collected Works	Won	
2022	We're Here: The Best Queer Speculative Fiction 2020	Locus Award	Anthology	Won	

Other awards
Year	Work	Award	Category	Result	Ref.
2020	PodCastle	Aurora Award	Best Related Work	Finalist	
2020	PodCastle	Ignyte Award	Fiction Podcast	Finalist	
2021	PodCastle	Aurora Award	Best Related Work	Finalist	
2021	PodCastle	Ignyte Award	Fiction Podcast	Finalist	
2021	PodCastle	Hugo Award	Best Semiprozine	Finalist	
2022	PodCastle	Ignyte Award	Fiction Podcast	Finalist	
2022	PodCastle	Hugo Award	Best Semiprozine	Finalist	

== Bibliography ==
=== Magic of the Lost trilogy ===
- —— (2021). The Unbroken. Orbit Books. ISBN 9780316542753.
- —— (2023). The Faithless. Orbit Books. ISBN 9780316542760.
- —— (2025). The Sovereign. Orbit Books. ISBN 9780316542883.

=== Short fiction ===
- "Your Eyes, My Beacon: Being an Account of Several Misadventures and How I Found My Way Home", first published in Uncanny Magazine, issue #46, 2022
- "The Captain and the Quartermaster", first published in Beneath Ceaseless Skies, issue #326, 2021
- "When the Last of the Birds and Bees Have Gone On", first published in Glitter + Ashes: Queer Tales of a World That Wouldn't Die, Neon Hemlock Press, 2020
- "Forgive Me, My Love, for the Ice and the Sea", first published in Beneath Ceaseless Skies, issue #296, 2020
- "You Perfect, Broken Thing", first published in Uncanny Magazine, issue #32, 2020
- "The Cook", first published in Uncanny Magazine, issue #22, 2018
- "Burning Season", first published in PodCastle, #519, 2018
- "Sisyphus", first published in FIYAH Literary Magazine of Black Speculative Fiction, issue #4, 2017

=== Essays ===
- ”Everyone’s in Love, but Nobody’s Horny”, published on Reactor.com (formerly Tor.com), 2025
- "The Crosses We Bear: The Butch Martyr in SFF", published on Tor.com, 2022
- "WWXD: A Warrior's Path of Reflection and Redemption", published in Uncanny Magazine, issue #41
- "The Fiction of Peace, the Fantasy of War", published in Fantasy Magazine, issue #66, 2021

=== Editor ===
- We're Here: The Best Queer Speculative Fiction of 2020, Neon Hemlock Press, 2021
- PodCastle, co-editor 2019-2021

== See also ==
- List of fantasy authors
- List of LGBT writers
