= Two Hands, Wrapped in Gold =

2022 story by S. B. Divya

"Two Hands, Wrapped in Gold" is a 2022 fantasy story by S. B. Divya, retelling the tale of Rumpelstiltskin. It was first published in Uncanny Magazine.

== Synopsis ==
When two traveling merchants in "the land of the rajputs" discover that their infant son Rampalalakshmirichan has the ability to transmute whatever his hands touch into gold, they wrap his hands in layers of gold cloth and muslin, and then flee with him to Bavaria — where his childhood and adolescence are more complicated than they had hoped.

== Reception ==
"Two Hands, Wrapped in Gold" was a finalist for the Nebula Award for Best Novelette of 2022. As well, it received enough nominations to be a finalist for the 2023 Hugo Award for Best Novelette; however, that year's Worldcon was taking place in China, and Divya declined the nomination as a protest against the Chinese government's treatment of the Uyghur population.

In Apex Magazine, A. C. Wise lauded it as "gorgeous" and "beautifully told", and emphasized that characters who, in the source material, have "little emotion or motivation", are portrayed by Divya as "fully rounded human beings (who) grow and change."

== Origins ==
Divya has described the story's origin as her own curiosity about Rumpelstiltskin's motivations, and the realistic tone of the film Ever After.
