= Machinehood =

2021 novel by S. B. Divya

Machinehood, a near-future science fiction thriller published in 2021, is the debut novel of S.B. Divya. It was a nominee for the Nebula Award for Best Novel in 2022.

== Critical reception ==
In a starred review, Publishers Weekly calls the novel a "stunning near-future thriller... [that] tackles issues of economic inequality, workers’ rights, privacy, and the nature of intelligence."

NPR writes that the book "takes its rightful place alongside the work of William Gibson, Malka Older, Isaac Asimov, Pat Cadigan, Vandana Singh, and Rudy Rucker."

Strange Horizons calls Machinehood "a compelling story that moves, often seamlessly, between the poles of grandeur and the quotidian.... squarely in the tradition of science fiction that fears to tackle neither the personal, nor the political—and at the same time."
