= Chaos Terminal =

2023 science fiction novel by Mur Lafferty

- 1st edition cover
- Author: Mur Lafferty
- Language: English
- Series: The Midsolar Murders
- Genre: Science fiction, mystery
- Publisher: Ace Books
- Publication date: 2023
- Publication place: United States
- Media type: Print (paperback)
- Pages: 384
- ISBN: 978-0-593-09813-4
- Preceded by: Station Eternity
- Followed by: Infinite Archive

Chaos Terminal is a science fiction mystery novel by Mur Lafferty, sequel to her earlier novel Station Eternity and the second novel in the Midsolar Murders series. It was first published in trade paperback by Ace Books in November 2023.

== Summary ==
Mallory Viridian, now settled in on space station Eternity as an amateur detective, is faced with a new major mystery when more visitors from her native planet Earth arrive, including three people she is personally acquainted with—and one of them is murdered. Complications include new troubles with the Sundry, the alien wasp species whose connections with Mallory are the source of her deductive genius, and erratic behavior from Eternity itself.

== Reception ==
Publishers Weekly gave the novel an enthusiastic review, calling it a "rip-roaring second Midsolar Murders mystery" and noting that "Lafferty does a solid job blending sci-fi worldbuilding and homicide investigation, though the plot feels a bit padded with flashbacks to Mallory's past. Still, the colorful cast delights, replete with irresistible aliens who are mostly mystified by human behaviors, self-doubting AI space vehicles, and quirky human scientists, diplomats, and CIA agents. This whirlwind adventure is good fun."
