= The Unbroken =

2021 epic fantasy novel by C.L. Clark

- First edition
- Author: C. L. Clark
- Cover artist: Tommy Arnold
- Language: English
- Series: Magic of the Lost
- Release number: 1
- Subject: Rebellion, fantasy war
- Genre: Fantasy
- Publisher: Orbit Books
- Publication date: Marc 23 2021
- Publication place: United States
- Media type: Novel (print, audiobook)
- Pages: 464
- ISBN: 9780316542753 (Trade paperback)
- OCLC: 1241201074
- Dewey Decimal: 813/.6
- LC Class: PS3603.L356626
- Followed by: The Faithless

The Unbroken is a 2021 epic fantasy novel, the debut novel by C. L. Clark. It is the first book in a planned trilogy entitled Magic of the Lost; it was followed by a sequel entitled The Faithless in 2023. It received critical acclaim for its exploration of colonialism in the setting of an epic fantasy novel. It was a finalist for the British Fantasy Award for best Fantasy Novel, Ignyte Award for Best Adult Novel, Locus Award for Best First Novel, and Nebula Award for Best Novel.

== Plot ==
The Empire of Balladaire rules over the colony of Qazāl, formerly part of the fallen Shālan Empire. Balladaire has banned all religion as “uncivilized”, but pockets of resistance still practice religion and its associated magic. Balladaire kidnaps Qazāli children to be conscripted into the Balladairan army; Touraine is one such child.

As an adult, Touraine and her company of conscripts (called Sands) are ordered to return to El-Wast, the Qazāli capital. They accompany Princess Luca, heir to the throne. Luca's uncle Nicholas currently holds power. She hopes that performing well in managing Qazāl will allow her to claim the throne in her own right.

As the princess arrives in the city, Touraine saves her from an assassination attempt. Touraine is falsely accused of murdering a Balladairan guard, but Luca rescues her. Dismissed from the military, Touraine becomes Luca's servant. On Luca's orders, Touraine secretly negotiates for peace with the Qazāli rebels, while developing romantic feelings for Luca. Luca grows interested in Shālan religion and magic, knowing that openly supporting these concepts would not be accepted in Balladaire. Touraine discovers that her birth mother, Jaghotai, is a leader of the rebellion. Other rebellion leaders include Djasha, an apostate priest who has lost her magic, and her wife Aranen, a healer.

Luca agrees to give the rebels guns as part of negotiations. Worried that the Sands will bear the brunt of any violence, Touraine betrays Luca to the Balladairan military leader, General Cantic. This leads to a violent uprising and a collapse of negotiations. Touraine joins the rebellion; Luca believes she has been killed in the chaos. The rebels ally with a desert tribe known as the Many-Legged, who use animal magic. Together, they create famine and plague, hoping to drive the Balladairans from their city. Tensions in El-Wast rise due to food shortages and violence. Almost a quarter of the Balladairan forces die from plague.

The rebels invade the Balladairan Quartier, hoping to free the Sands. Touraine and the rebels confront General Cantic. Djasha is killed, Touraine is captured, and the rebels are defeated. As Touraine is about to be executed by firing squad, she gains access to Shālan magic. Aranen escapes and kills Cantic. Luca agrees to leave Qazāl in exchange for the Balladairans’ safety. Touraine stays to help rebuild El-Wast.

== Major themes ==
The novel explores themes of colonialism in a setting inspired by North Africa. Publishers Weekly wrote a review that stated Touraine straddles "the line between colonizer and colonized". One reviewer in Locus felt that the kidnapping of Qazāli children explores the "scars of colonialism’s impact", referring to the kidnapping of Qazāli children and their conscription into the Balladairan military.

== Reception ==
Publishers Weekly gave the novel a starred review, calling it "a captivating story that works both as high fantasy and skillful cultural commentary". Library Journal gave the novel a starred review, praising it for its strong worldbuilding as well as its themes of racism, colonization, and military conscription.

Writing for Locus, Maya Clark praised Touraine's slow character development and the satisfying way in which she unlearns her Balladairan social conditionings. She also praised the moral grayness of the novel, writing that Clark "masterfully engages all actors and viewpoints within this complex web of power". A review in Lightspeed praised the complex romantic relationship between Luca and Touraine, including the author's exploration of disability, healing magic, and religion. A review in Strange Horizons praised the novel's "engaging, subversive characters" and exploration of colonialism, while noting that the pacing was "a little odd around the midpoint and ending".

== Awards and nominations ==
Year	Award	Category	Result	Ref.
2021	Goodreads Choice Award	Fantasy	Finalist	
2021	Nebula Award	Best Novel	Nominated	
2022	British Fantasy Award	Fantasy Novel (Robert Holdstock Award)	Shortlisted	
2022	Ignyte Award	Adult Novel	Finalist	
2022	Locus Award	Best First Novel	Finalist	
