= The Radio Adventures of Dr. Floyd =

Radio program and podcast

The Radio Adventures of Dr. Floyd is a short audio and video series distributed via podcasting. Created by Grant Baciocco and Doug Price, it is a family friendly show in the style of old-time radio. The show also draws much inspiration from The Rocky & Bullwinkle Show. The show first began in April 2004 on Dementia Radio but gained its popularity via podcasting. The show originates from Hood Avenue Studios in Burbank, California.

== Plot ==
=== Seasons 1–6 (and live episodes) ===
When his Time and Space Travel Device is stolen by the evil mastermind Dr. Steve and his sock-shaped assistant Fidgert. Dr. Floyd, his young protégé Dr. Grant and their faithful robot companion C.H.I.P.S. must do what they can to get it back. Bent on achieving fame and fortune, Dr. Steve plans to race through history, stealing historical items and then returning to the future to sell them on eBay. Can Dr. Floyd and his crew thwart the evil machinations of Dr. Steve and Fidgert?

In almost every episode the cast visits a famous historical figure.

At the end of Season 6, Dr. Grant passed his "Protégé 101" test (with a score of 98%) and thus tested out of protégé classification (and therefore must leave Dr. Floyd); C.H.I.P.S.' parents are in dire trouble and C.H.I.P.S must help them without Dr. Floyd's help (because bringing humans to C.H.I.P.S.' planet is forbidden and would get C.H.I.P.S. into big trouble); and Dr. Steve returns the Time and Space Travel Device to Dr. Floyd (because Dr. Floyd has stopped him every time he has used it for personal gain.)

=== Season 7 ===
At the start of Season 7, Dr. Steve (and later Dr. Floyd) go down to the Saddle River City Library to do some book browsing. The Librarian asks if there is some Doctor Convention in town, mainly because there have been so many doctors coming to the library. Dr. Floyd heads to the classical literature section placed in the basement of the Library. He finds Dr. Steve trying to find a book on 'the life and times of Berry Manilow'. Dr. Floyd then gives Dr. Steve a lesson on the Dewey Decimal System and then says he's in the wrong area as the classical literature is in the 800's. As Dr. Floyd shows him to the right section of the Library, they are stopped by three Doctors in different coats who are named collectively 'The Literati'. Their goal is to 'bring about the total destruction and complete annihilation of Dr. Floyd!' The Literati invented the Translitora which "looks somewhat like a laser cannon", but was built to destroy Dr. Floyd.

Dr. Steve however says that there can only be one person against Dr. Floyd- himself. Dr. Steve pushes the button on the Translitora, its effect grabbing both Dr. Floyd and Dr. Steve. In a flash Dr. Floyd and Dr. Steve both vanish. The Literati are thrilled that they have now gotten rid of Dr. Floyd. However, Dr. Floyd finds that he and Dr. Steve are now stuck in the stories of Classic literature with the remote control.

In every episode in Season 7, the cast visits a famous classical novel/book.

The final two episodes of Season 7 try to wrap up this Season by sending Dr. Grant and CHIPS back to Dr. Floyd's Lab, (with mini episodes only found on by members of the show, e.g. The Imagination Nations Rangers/Members and eventually getting Dr. Steve and Dr. Floyd out of Classical Literature. Eventually Fidgert steals the Time and Space Travel Device and Dr. Floyd, Dr. Grant and CHIPS are again trying to chase Dr. Steve and Fidgert.

=== Season 8 ===
This season begins with Dr. Floyd and company fleeing from Dr. Steve throughout time and space, until Dr. Steve ultimately corners them. He then shoots Dr. Floyd with a mysterious weapon, causing Dr. Floyd to permanently disappear.

The rest of the season covers the events leading up to this season.

== History ==
The first episode was aired on Dementia Radio on April 4, 2004, and began podcasting on November 7, 2004. Each episode is approximately 7 minutes long, though some are longer and some are shorter. The shows have featured guest stars from around the entertainment world playing historical figures. June Foray, Jeffrey Tambor, Don Novello, Frank Conniff, Rick Overton, Kira Soltanovich and Ron Lynch are among the celebrities who have played parts on the show.

The show was nominated for Best Comedy Podcast in the first ever Podcast Awards.

In September 2010, the creators announced on their website that Season 8 (their current season) would be their final season and that after the final episode is aired, they will be releasing all their episodes online for free to download.

=== Awards ===
Award	Year	Category	Result	Ref.
Parsec Awards	2006	Best Audio Drama	Won	
Parsec Awards	2007	Best Audio Drama	Won	
Parsec Awards	2007	Best Audio Production	Won	
Parsec Awards	2008	Best Speculative Fiction Audio Drama	Finalist	
Parsec Awards	2009	Best Speculative Fiction Audio Drama	Won	
Parsec Awards	2010	Best Speculative Fiction Audio Drama	Finalist	
Parsec Awards	2010	Best Speculative Fiction Video Story	Finalist	
Parsec Awards	2011	Best Speculative Fiction Audio Drama	Won	
Podcast Peer Award	2006	Best Family Friendly Podcast	Won	
Podcast Peer Award	2007	Best Fiction Podcast	Won	
Podcast Peer Award	2007	Best Family Friendly Podcast	Won	
Just Plain Folks Music Award	2006	Children's Storytelling	Nominated	

== Characters ==
=== Main characters ===
- Dr. Floyd – (Doug Price) "The World's Most Brilliant Scientist" and the hero of the show. His main pet peeve is that Dr. Grant always talks about his small head.
- Dr. Grant – (Grant Baciocco) Dr. Floyd's young protégé
- C.H.I.P.S. – (Moira Quirk) Dr. Floyd and Dr. Grant's faithful robot companion
- Dr. Steve – Evil mastermind and Dr. Floyd's nemesis
- Fidgert – Dr. Steve's "sock-shaped" assistant

=== Minor characters ===
- Mr. Narrator – narrator of the shows, who interacts with the characters at times
- Flight Attendant Krystee – a flight attendant on Dr. Floyd's Time & Space Ship
- Ensign Tim Porary – red shirted expendable crewman
- Mrs. Doris Floyd – (Leslie Carrara-Rudolph) mother of Dr. Floyd
- Mr. Beardychins – Mrs. Floyd's Pomeranian puppy
- Dr. Doug – wayward protégé of Dr. Floyd

=== Historical figures ===
- Al Capone – (Ryan Smith) Episodes 105, 106 & 107
- Wilbur Wright – (Chris Waffle) Episodes 109 & 110
- Orville Wright – (Tim Waffle) Episodes 109 & 110
- Molly Pitcher – (Carla Ulbrich) Episodes 201 & 202
- Johann Pachelbel – (Rob Paravonian) Episodes 203 & 204
- David Livingstone – (Grant Baciocco) Episodes 208, 209 & 210
- Henry Morton Stanley – (Doug Price) Episodes 208, 209 & 210
- Cleopatra – (Deven Green) Episodes 211 & 212
- Mark Antony – (Joel Bryant) Episodes 211 & 212
- Meriwether Lewis – (Jeff Smith) Episodes 302 & 303
- William Clark – (Matthew Dunn) Episodes 302 & 303
- P.T. Barnum – (Luke Ski) Episodes 304, 305 & 306
- H. G. Wells – (Rick Overton) Episode 308
- Orson Welles – (Rick Overton) Episode 308
- Annie Oakley – (Kira Soltanovich) Episodes 311 & 312
- Buffalo Bill Cody – (Frank Conniff) Episodes 311 & 312
- Jimmy Hoffa – (Doug Price) Episode 401
- Ted Hustead & Wall Drug – (Grant Baciocco) Episode 403 & 404
- Alva J. Fisher – (Tony Foster) Episode 405
- George Washington – (Jeffrey Tambor) Episodes 407 & 408
- Alexander Hamilton – (Chris Hardwick) Episode 407
- Thomas Jefferson – (Jeremy Aengel) Episode 407
- Henry Knox – (Doug Price) Episode 407
- Edmund Randolph – (Grant Baciocco) Episode 407
- Martha Washington – (Leslie Carrara-Rudolph) Episode 408
- Gilbert Stuart – (Mike Hollingsworth) Episode 408
- Benjamin Franklin – (Chuck McCann) Episodes 410 & 411
- Pablo Picasso – (Lance Anderson) Episode 413
- Galileo – (Don Novello) Episodes 414 & 415
- Susan B. Anthony – (June Foray) Episodes 501, 502 & 503
- William Bradford (1590-1657) – (John Billingsley) Episodes 507 & 508
- Mary Brewster – (Bonita Friederecy) Episodes 507 & 508
- Amelia Earhart – (Maria Bamford) Episodes 513 & 601
- Fred Noonan – (Frank Conniff) Episodes 513 & 601
- Blackbeard – (Joel Hodgson) Episodes 602 & 603
- Sherlock Holmes (Stan Freberg) Episodes 709 & 710
- Francois Barbe-Marbois – (Doug Price) Episode SE001
- James Monroe – (Doug Price) Episode SE001
- Robert R. Livingston – (Grant Baciocco) Episode SE001
