= The Faithless (Clark novel) =

2023 novel by C.L. Clark

- Author: C. L. Clark
- Language: English
- Series: Magic of the Lost
- Release number: 2
- Genre: Fantasy
- Publication date: 7 Mar 2023
- Publication place: United States
- Pages: 558
- Preceded by: The Unbroken
- Followed by: The Sovereign

The Faithless is a 2023 epic fantasy novel by C. L. Clark. It is the second book in the planned Magic of the Lost trilogy, following Clark's 2021 novel The Unbroken. The novels follows the characters in the aftermath of a rebellion from the first novel, as they grapple with independence and their new political realities.

== Plot ==
Touraine and Aranen go to Balladaire to meet with Luca and pursue diplomacy as official ambassadors of an independent Qazāl. A young girl named Ghadin is sent as Touraine's page.

Duke Nicholas Ancier plans to hold a Trial of Competence, legally usurping the throne from Luca. Luca's friend Bastien has been helping her research the lost Balladairan religion. Luca finds Bastien murdered outside the palace. Luca and her friend Sabine du Durfort suspect that Nicholas is behind Bastien's death.

Nicholas offers Touraine a new contract which acknowledges Qazāli independence, but gives harsh terms and continues to extract tribute. If Touraine refuses to sign it, he threatens a reconquest of the former colony. Luca learns that Balladaire's lost magic required child sacrifice to ensure good crops. She is unsure if she should continue to research the religion if the price is so high.

Luca's carriage is attacked. Ghadin is separated from Luca and Touraine. Ghadin meets Fili, a carpenter's apprentice and member of the Fingers. The Fingers are a revolutionary group who want to overthrow the Balladairan monarchy. Fili has access to Balladairan magic; she can make plants grow at the cost of her own blood. Fili helps treat Ghadin's injuries and returns her to the palace guards. However, Ghadin is given to Duke Nicholas as a prisoner.

Nicholas breaks Ghadin's arm and threatens to torture her. Touraine agrees to sign his modified treaty. Luca goes to Nicholas and agrees to abdicate in exchange for becoming minister of Shālan affairs and also for Ghadin's safety. Luca secretly plots to poison Nicholas with Touraine and Sabine.

Ghadin tells Touraine about Fili and the Fingers. Luca publicly announces her abdication. Fili stabs Luca multiple times. Touraine is able to access Shāl's magic to heal her.

Nicholas's young son Tiro drinks the poison and dies instead of Nicholas. Luca's guards arrest Nicholas as part of a coup. Luca is crowned queen of Balladaire. She proposes to Touraine, who accepts. Luca's reign immediately faces dual threats: the return of a plague known as the Withering, and an uprising in the city of Samra’.

== Reception ==
Alana Joli Abbott of Paste praised the characterization of both the major and minor characters in the novel, writing that "each of these characters is their own universe, with struggles and decisions to weigh, and ethical dilemmas that make them choose, with their actions, who they will be on the next page." Abbott felt that The Faithless surpassed the expectations set by the first novel. Martin Cahill praised both the plotting and characterization, stating that "Clark employs an expert level of finesse in the machinations of each of these complicated, complex women." In a review for Locus, Leslye Penelope writes that "Clark wields a deft hand, painting characters who are nuanced, scarred inside and out, and deeply human." Penelope wrote that "fans of romantic fantasy will yearn for more fireworks in the chemistry between Touraine and Luca", but overall praised the complicated romance between the two characters.

Brigid Flanagan of Grimdark Magazine gave the novel four stars, praising the "brutal intensity" of Clark's prose and writing that "The Faithless intentionally shows with great intensity the actions of colonizers in a narrative that neither forgives, softens, or redeems." Flanagan criticized the inclusion of Fili's chapters and the meandering subplots, feeling that The Faithless was inferior to its prequel.
