= Six Wakes =

2017 sci-fi novel by Mur Lafferty

- Cover of first edition
- Author: Mur Lafferty
- Language: English
- Genre: Science fiction
- Publisher: Orbit Books
- Publication date: 2017
- Publication place: United States
- Media type: Print (paperback)
- Pages: 361
- ISBN: 978-0-316-38968-6

Six Wakes is a science fiction mystery novel by Mur Lafferty. It was first published in trade paperback and ebook by Orbit Books in January 2017.

== Summary ==
The story takes place aboard the Dormire, a starship carrying thousands of prospective colonists from Earth to a planet in the Tau Ceti star system. All the passengers are in coldsleep; only a six-person crew of cloned former criminals remains awake through the generations-long journey, each of them recloned and imprinted with their continually updated memories as they age and die. The journey is anticipated to take several centuries, and is sponsored by Sallie Mignon, an eccentric multi-billionaire who financed the construction of the Dormire and is currently aboard as a colonist. Cloning technology is not restricted to shipboard life, and a number of laws, called the "Codicils," have sprung up around cloning after numerous abuses of genetic engineering and the "hacking" (deliberate altering) of mindmaps.

The latest clone of crew member Maria Arena awakens twenty-five years into the voyage to discover her most recent self, and those of the rest of the crew, murdered, and her accumulated memories of the whole trip wiped. The new clones of the other crew members prove equally amnesiac as they awaken; the cloning tanks have been sabotaged; and IAN, the ship's guiding artificial intelligence, has been crippled and is taking the starship off course. The result is a locked-room mystery as the six crew members—Captain Katrina de la Cruz; pilot and navigator Akihiro Sato; security chief Wolfgang; engineer Paul Seurat; ship's doctor Joanna Glass; and Maria herself, general housekeeper for the ship—try to determine which of them has murdered their previous selves and sabotaged the voyage, and how to get the voyage back on track.

As the crew attempt to unravel the mystery, each character's history—often extensive, as all of them are clones with lifespans stretching back hundreds of years—allows Lafferty to continue worldbuilding, as many of them were present for significant events in the story's fictional history. As an example, Dr. Glass turns out to have also, in a previous incarnation, been a lawmaker who was instrumental in proposing and ratifying the Codicils, earning her the ire of those whose abuse of genetic engineering and mindmap hacking have now been outlawed. These moments turn out to be crucial in helping the crew decipher the mystery, because somewhere over the course of history, each of them managed to piss someone off...

== Awards ==
Six Wakes was a preliminary nominee for the 2017 BSFA Award for Best Novel and a finalist for the 2018 Philip K. Dick Award, the 2018 Hugo Award for Best Novel, and the 2018 Nebula Award for Best Novel.

== Reception ==
The reviewer for Kirkus Reviews seems puzzled by the author's "venture into science-fiction horror" after her "hilarious" earlier novel The Shambling Guide to New York City, opining "[y]ou have to wonder why, given Lafferty's manifest talent for humor, she didn't simply play it for laughs." The initial setup is rated "familiar to mystery fans" and "[m]aybe ... just too devious for its own good." Moreover, "the narrative never quite lives up to [its] remarkable opening. Momentum dissipates amid frequent pauses to belabor the cloning process and laws relating to clone succession, not to mention a succession of scientific howlers ... Still, as the characters delve separately and together into their previous lives in search of an explanation for their predicament, the tension rises, personalities are revealed, and common factors emerge—some of them, we learn, are retired, recovering, or repurposed homicidal maniacs." In summation, the reviewer concedes that "readers easily captivated and not overly concerned with structural dependability will find much to entertain them."

Publishers Weekly calls the novel "a tense nail-biter of a story fueled by memorable characters and thoughtful worldbuilding" that "explores complex technological and moral issues in a way that’s certain to earn it a spot on award ballots."

Emily Compton-Dzak, writing in Booklist, finds the book "a perfect blend of science fiction and mystery, complete with Clue-like red herrings and thought-provoking philosophizing about the slippery slope of cloning technology." She calls it "[h]ighly recommended for Firefly fans and fans of a good mystery."

Megan M. McArdle in Library Journal writes "Lafferty ... delivers the ultimate locked-room mystery combined with top-notch sf worldbuilding. The puzzle of who is responsible for the devastation on the ship keeps the pages turning."

LaShawn M. Wanak in Lightspeed likens the novel to "a mash-up of The Thing and Clue" that "shines best when focusing on its mystery and thriller aspect," noting that "Lafferty does a good job of creating an atmosphere of tension and paranoia as the crew tries to figure out who the murderer is." She feels "[t]here is some infodumping, but I found it fascinating; [Lafferty] could easily write two or three books based on the ethics of cloning." Wanak praises the cast of characters as "delightfully diverse" but finds the ending "a little too neat, and ethically troubling, in light of all the focus that is put on clones and humans being treated well."

The novel was also reviewed by Amy Goldschlager in Locus no. 675, April 2017.
