= S. B. Divya =

Speculative fiction author

- S. B. Divya at Worldcon 2026
- Education: California Institute of Technology; University of California, San Diego
- Occupation: Author
- Writing career
- Genre: Science fiction
- Website: sbdivya.com

S. B. Divya is the pen name of Divya Srinivasan Breed, who writes speculative fiction. She is also an engineer and was the co-editor for Escape Pod, along with Mur Lafferty, through April 8, 2022.

Her debut novella, Runtime, published by Tor.com, was nominated for the 2016 Nebula Award for Best Novella. It was also optioned for film and television adaptation for Escape Artists. The indie game Rogue Wizards, released by Spellbound Studios, features her writing.

Her debut novel, Machinehood, was published in 2021 by Saga Press, and received both high praise, with one reviewer describing it as upgrading Asimov's laws of robotics, but also criticism for not going far enough in its exploration of ideas. Divya's second full-length novel, Meru, was published in 2023, and has been described both as surprisingly optimistic about the fate of humanity and as an epic sci-fi in a unique world. Her short story collection, Contingency Plans for the Apocalypse and Other Possible Situations, is published by Hachette India.

== Personal life ==
Born in Pondicherry, India, as Divya, her given name, S.B. Divya immigrated to the United States with her parents when she was five. Her father was a professor of business administration and her mother was a software engineer. The S in her pen name stands for her patronym, Srinivasan, and the B stands for Breed, her husband's surname.

Divya holds a BS degree from California Institute of Technology (Caltech) with a major in Computation and Neural Systems, and an M.Eng. in Signal Processing from the University of California, San Diego. Her interests and hobbies include hiking, snowboarding, scuba diving, mountain biking, oil painting, and reading. She has been a disc jockey and is eclectic in her musical tastes.

== Career ==
Divya's first short story, "Strange Attractors", was published in Daily Science Fiction, followed by "The Egg" in the science journal, Nature. This was followed by several short stories in various magazines, including Analog, Lightspeed, and Mothership Zeta.

S.B. Divya’s debut novella, Runtime, is about a gruelling race across the Sierra Nevada among those equipped with exoskeletal and internal human enhancements. Human enhancement also features in her first novel, released in March of 2021 titled Machinehood, which is about the conflicts arising from the perceived rights of sentient robots and enhanced humans in a gig economy.

Her vision of the future in her writings is conditioned by the scientific method that she was schooled in during her years at Caltech. An example of this is the conflict between artificial intelligence and humanity that she envisions in Machinehood. As Ray Kurzweil notes in his review of the book, “From the opening manifesto to its ingenious technologies, Machinehood builds an inspiring and believable vision of the future that is both thought-provoking and hopeful. It will leave you wishing that tomorrow could arrive a little sooner.”

Prior to becoming a full-time writer, Divya worked as a signal processing engineer and data scientist for several years. She holds multiple patents in pulse oximetry and signal processing. Her patents in pulse oximetry are antecedents to the Masimo Corp's iSpO2® Pulse Oximeter for home use.

== Works ==
=== Novels ===
- Loka (2024)
- Meru (2023)
- Machinehood (2021)

=== Novellas ===
- Runtime (2016)

=== Collections ===
- Contingency Plans for the Apocalypse and Other Possible Situations (2019)

=== Anthologies ===
- Where the Stars Rise (2017)
- The Gollancz Book of South Asian Science Fiction: Ed. Tarun K. Saint (2019)
- Escape Pod: The Anthology (ed.) (2020)
- Rebuilding Tomorrow (2020)

=== Short fiction ===
- Soft We Wake (2019)
- Dusty Old Things (2019)
- Loss of Signal (2018)
- Contingency Plans for the Apocalypse (2018)
- An Unexpected Boon (2017)
- Looking Up (2017)
- Microbiota and the Masses: A Love Story (2017)
- Nava (2017)
- Gaps of Joy, and a Knot for Love (2016)
- The Boy Who Made Flowers (2016)
- Binaries (2016)
- Ships in the Night (2015)
- The Egg (2015)
- Strange Attractors (2014)
- "Two Hands, Wrapped in Gold" (2022)

=== Narration ===
==== Escape Pod ====
- EP569 Safe Harbour(Artemis Rising), by Kristene Perron
- EP593 Planetbound, by Nancy Fulda; read by S.B. Divya & Trendane Sparks
- EP619 A Study in Symmetry, or the Chance Encounter of an Android and a Painter(Artemis Rising), by Jamie Lackey; read by Trendane Sparks & S.B. Divya

==== PodCastle ====
- PC523 Never Yawn Under a Banyan Tree, by Nibedita Sen

==== Cast of Wonders ====
- CW327 Memories of Mirrored Worlds, by Barbara A. Barnett

==== Beneath Ceaseless Skies ====
- BCS246 Sankalpa, by Marie Brennan

== Awards and recognition ==
- Runtime - Nominated for the 2016 Nebula Award for Best Novella
- Escape Pod - Nominated for the 2018 Hugo Award for Best Semiprozine
- Escape Pod - Nominated for the 2020-2025 Hugo Award for Best Semiprozine
- Machinehood - Starred review in the Publishers Weekly
