= PodCastle =

Fantasy podcast

- Genre: Fantasy fiction Short Stories, Fantasy podcast

Publication
- Original release: 1 April 2008
- Updates: Weekly

PodCastle is a weekly audio fantasy fiction podcast. They release audio performances of fantasy short fiction, including all the subgenres of fantasy, including magical realism, urban fantasy, slipstream, high fantasy, and dark fantasy. As of 2022, Shingai Njeri Kagunda and Eleanor R. Wood share editing duties with support from Assistant Editor Sofía Barker and audio producers Devin Martin and Eric Valdes, and the show is mainly hosted by Matt Dovey, with occasional guest hosts.

== History ==
PodCastle was the third show conceived by Escape Artists, Inc. founder, Serah Eley, which also produces Escape Pod, Pseudopod and Cast of Wonders. PodCastle launched on 1 April 2008 with Rachel Swirsky as founding editor and Ann Leckie as assistant editor. Swirsky left in 2010 to focus on her own writing, and went on to win the 2013 Nebula Award for Best Short Story for her "If You Were A Dinosaur, My Love". While editor at PodCastle, Leckie's 2013 novel, Ancillary Justice, won multiple awards, including the 2014 Hugo Award for best novel.

Editors Anna Schwind and Dave Thompson stepped down at the end of March 2015 and were slated to be replaced by Kitty NicIaian and Dawn Phynix, with Leckie continuing to serve as associate editor. However, the new editors were unable to take the helm, and Rachael K. Jones and Graeme Dunlop began sharing editing and hosting duties instead.

In 2017 the editorial reins were handed over to an international cohort headed by co-editors Khaalidah Muhammad Ali and Jen R. Albert, with Setsu Uzumé (later known as Summer Fletcher) hosting. Khaalidah stepped down to concentrate on her own writing in early 2019 and was replaced by C. L. Clark ("Cherae"); in mid-2021, Albert and Clark both departed to concentrate on their respective careers and were replaced by Shingai Njeri Kagunda and Eleanor R. Wood. Summer Fletcher stepped down from the assistant editor and host roles at the end of 2021 and was replaced by Sofia Barker and Matt Dovey respectively.

== Content ==
PodCastle has released hundreds of stories on a weekly basis with stories generally between 2,000 and 6,000 words long, written by authors such as Peter S. Beagle, Nancy Kress, Jeff VanderMeer, N. K. Jemisin, Kelly Link and Ken Liu. Although focused on short fiction, PodCastle has also run reviews and longer stories, both as hour-plus "Giant" episodes and as multi-part serials.

PodCastle is distributed under a Creative Commons license that allows non-commercial redistribution, requires attribution, and forbids derivatives. The fiction itself remains copyrighted by its respective authors. PodCastle contracts with authors for non-exclusive audio rights and pays semi-professional rates. In 2013 the site averaged 79,900 monthly downloads of the podcast. Podcasts such as Podcastle, Pseudopod, and Escape Pod provide a means of accessing speculative fiction online.

== Reception ==
Eugie Foster, for The UK SF Book News Network, wrote that "short fiction audio podcast magazines like Escape Pod and its sister publications, Pseudopod and PodCastle, have caught the interest and imagination of fiction enthusiasts, and doing a wonderful job at reviving awareness in both new short fiction and classic works".

=== Accolades ===
Year	Award	Category	Work	Result	Ref.
2010	Parsec Awards	Best Speculative Fiction Story (Short Form)	"Restless in My Hand" by Tim Pratt	Finalist	
2015	Parsec Awards	Best Speculative Fiction Story: Large Cast (Short Form)	"Super-Baby-Moms Group Saves the Day" by Tina Connolly	Finalist	
2017	Academy of Podcasters	Fiction	PodCastle	Won	
2018	Parsec Awards	Best Speculative Fiction Story: Small Cast (Short Form)	"Six Jobs" by Tim Pratt, as narrated by Stephanie Malia Morris	Won (Note: Declined the award in protest at another winner's known history of abusive behaviour.)	
2018	World Fantasy Award	Special Award category	PodCastle	Finalist	
2020	British Fantasy Award	Best Audio category	PodCastle	Won	
2020	Ignyte Awards	Best Fiction Podcast	PodCastle	Finalist	
2020	Prix Aurora Awards	Best Related Work	PodCastle	Nominated	
2021	Ignyte Awards	Best Fiction Podcast	PodCastle	Finalist	
2021	Prix Aurora Awards	Best Related Work	PodCastle	Nominated	
2021	Reddit r/fantasy Stabby Awards	Best Audio Original Fiction	PodCastle	Finalist	
2021	Hugo Award	Best Semiprozine	PodCastle	Finalist	
2022	Ignyte Awards	Best Fiction Podcast	PodCastle	Finalist	
2022	British Fantasy Award	Best Audio category	PodCastle	Finalist	
2022	Hugo Award	Best Semiprozine	PodCastle	Finalist	
2025	Ignyte Award	Best Fiction Podcast	PodCastle	Won	
2026	British Fantasy Award	Best Audio	PodCastle	Pending	

== See also ==
- Fantasy podcast
