= Dragon Con =

Annual pop culture fan convention in Atlanta

- Status: Active
- Genre: Multigenre
- Venue: Hyatt Regency Atlanta, Atlanta Marriott Marquis, Atlanta Hilton and Towers, Courtland Grand Hotel (Formerly Sheraton Atlanta), Westin Peachtree Plaza, AmericasMart
- Locations: Atlanta, Georgia
- Coordinates: 33.761397°N 84.387536°W
- Country: United States
- Inaugurated: 1987; 39 years ago
- Attendance: 80,000+ in 2017
- Organizer: Rachel Reeves and David Cody, Co-Chairmen
- Filing status: For-profit
- Website: www.dragoncon.org

Dragon Con (previously Dragon*Con and sometimes DragonCon) is an American multigenre convention, founded in 1987, which takes place annually over the Labor Day weekend in Atlanta, Georgia. As of 2017, the convention draws attendance of over 80,000. It features hundreds of guests, encompasses five hotels in the Peachtree Center neighborhood of downtown Atlanta near Centennial Olympic Park, and runs thousands of hours of programming for fans of science fiction, fantasy, comic books, and other elements of fan culture. It is owned and operated by a private for-profit corporation, with the help of a 1,500-member volunteer staff. Dragon Con has hosted the 1990 Origins Game Fair and the 1995 North American Science Fiction Convention (NASFiC).

== History ==
Dragon Con was launched in 1987, as a project of a local science fiction and gaming group, the Dragon Alliance of Gamers and Role-Players (DAGR). It was founded by a board of directors including John Bunnell, David Cody, Robert Dennis, Mike Helba, Pat Henry, and Ed Kramer.

The name "Dragon" for the club was derived from Kramer's Dragon Computer, which hosted a local Bulletin Board System ("The Dragon") that initially served as a central hub for both organizations. The inaugural Dragon*Con flyers debuted at the 1986 Atlanta Worldcon, ConFederation. Within a year, Dragon*Con had been selected to be the host of the 1990 Origins convention, to take place at the Atlanta Hilton.

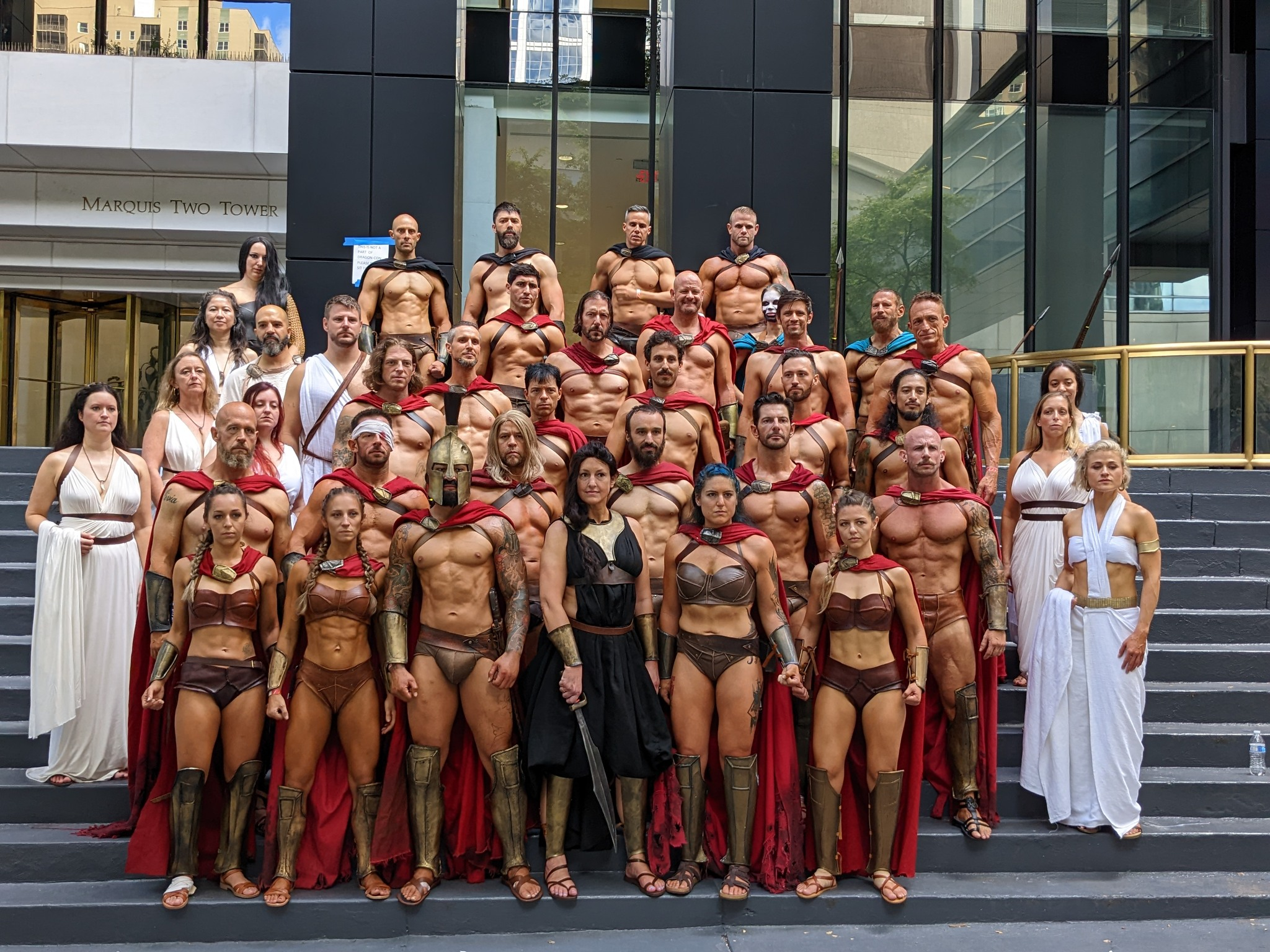
Cosplayers dressed as Spartans, inspired by the movie 300, at DragonCon

The 1987 inaugural Dragon*Con, and following 1988 event, took place at the Pierremont Plaza Hotel (since rebranded as Crown Plaza Atlanta-Midtown by IHG). It drew 1400 fans, and featured Guest of Honor Michael Moorcock, Lynn Abbey and Robert Asprin, Robert Adams, Ultima creator Richard "Lord British" Garriott, co-creator of Dungeons & Dragons Gary Gygax and Toastmaster Brad Strickland. Miramar recording artist Jonn Serrie delivered his keyboard arrangements from within a real NASA flightsuit and Michael Moorcock performed onstage with Blue Öyster Cult's Eric Bloom, singing "Veteran of the Psychic Wars" and "Black Blade". Thomas E. Fuller's Atlanta Radio Theatre Company performed H. P. Lovecraft's Call of Cthulhu, which was broadcast via radio live from onsite. The 1988 convention included guests Alan Dean Foster, Fred Saberhagen, Margaret Weis, Tracy Hickman, Gary Gygax, and Larry Elmore.

The convention grew rapidly. In 1989, it drew 2,400 fans (many to see Guest of Honor Anne McCaffrey), and the event had moved to the Omni Hotel and Convention Center. In 1990, the convention had doubled again, added a Comics Expo, hosted the Origins convention, this time with Guest of Honor Tom Clancy, and expanded to include the Atlanta Sheraton hotel. In 1991 the first "Robot Battles" robotic competition event was added to the list of Dragon*Con events, making it the second oldest robotic competition event in the world.

In 1993, Dragon*Con was the home of the Wizard Fan Awards.

By 1995, when Dragon*Con hosted the North American Science Fiction Convention, attendance had grown to over 14,000 fans, and Dragon*Con was also hosting the International Starfleet Conference. In 1999, Dragon*Con's TrekTrak introduced the first Miss Klingon Empire Beauty Pageant, an annual event that has since garnered national media attention.

In 2000, Ed Kramer ceased to have an active role in managing the convention, but still owned 34% of the company. In 2011, Kramer sued the organizers, leveling charges that he was not receiving his fair share of the con's profits. Kramer's relationship with the convention was fully severed in July 2013 in a cash-out merger, at which point the name of the convention and business officially changed to "Dragon Con" (replacing the asterisk with a space).

At the convention's 20th anniversary in 2007, there were 22,000 attendees, and the convention continued to grow, drawing 40,000 attendees in 2010, 57,000 in 2013, and over 80,000 in 2017.

On July 6, 2020, it was announced that Dragon Con had been cancelled due to the COVID-19 pandemic, with a virtual event being organized in its place on the original dates. The event announced that it would return for 2021 with enhanced health and safety protocols; it would be capped at around 40,000 attendees, badges would only be sold online and not on-site, masks would be mandatory within indoor spaces, and the Dragon Con parade would only be open to those who hold badges. Some of the virtual features from 2020 would also be maintained, including a "virtual marketplace", and streaming content (including free content and a paid "DragonConTV" streaming membership). On August 17, it was also announced that all attendees must present proof of vaccination for COVID-19 or a negative test from within the past 72 hours in order to claim their badges.

Dragon Con Date, Location, and Attendance
| Year | Date | Location | Estimated Attendance |
|---|---|---|---|
| 1987 | October 2 – October 4 | Pierremont Plaza Hotel and Conference Center | 1,400 |
| 1988 | October 7 – October 9 | Pierremont Plaza Hotel and Conference Center | 1,700 |
| 1989 | October 6 – October 8 | The Omni Hotel & Convention Center | 3,200 |
| 1990 | June 28 – July 1 | Atlanta Hilton & Towers, Atlanta Radisson | 6,900 |
| 1991 | July 12 – July 14 | Atlanta Hilton & Towers | 5,200 |
| 1992 | July 17 – July 19 | Atlanta Hilton & Towers | 6,100 |
| 1993 | July 16 – July 18 | Atlanta Hilton & Towers | 8,000 |
| 1994 | July 15 – July 17 | Atlanta Hilton & Towers, Westin Peachtree Plaza, Atlanta Civic Center | 11,000 |
| 1995 | July 13 – July 16 | Atlanta Hilton & Towers, Westin Peachtree Plaza, Atlanta Civic Center, Atlanta Ramada | 14,000 |
| 1996 | June 20 – June 23 | Atlanta Hilton & Towers, Westin Peachtree Plaza, Atlanta Civic Center | 13,400 |
| 1997 | June 26 – June 29 | The Inforum Convention Center, Westin Peachtree Plaza, Atlanta Civic Center | 18,000 |
| 1998 | September 3 – September 6 | Hyatt Regency, The AmericasMart | 18,000 |
| 1999 | July 1 – July 3 | Hyatt Regency Atlanta, Atlanta Merchandise Mart, Atlanta Apparel Mart | 19,000 |
| 2000 | June 29 – July 2 | Hyatt Regency Atlanta, Atlanta Merchandise Mart, Atlanta Apparel Mart | 20,000 |
| 2001 | August 31 – September 3 | Hyatt Regency Atlanta, Marriott Marquis | 20,000+ |
| 2002 | August 30 – September 2 | Hyatt Regency Atlanta, Marriott Marquis | 20,000+ |
| 2003 | August 29 – September 1 | Hyatt Regency Atlanta, Marriott Marquis | 20,000+ |
| 2004 | September 3 – September 6 | Hyatt Regency Atlanta, Marriott Marquis | 20,000+ |
| 2005 | September 2 – September 5 | Hyatt Regency Atlanta, Marriott Marquis, Atlanta Hilton | 20,000+ |
| 2006 | September 1 – September 4 | Hyatt Regency Atlanta, Marriott Marquis, Atlanta Hilton | 25,000+ |
| 2007 | August 31 – September 3 | Hyatt Regency Atlanta, Marriott Marquis, Atlanta Hilton | 30,000+ |
| 2008 | August 30 – September 2 | Hyatt Regency Atlanta, Marriott Marquis, Atlanta Hilton, Sheraton | 30,000+ |
| 2009 | September 4 – September 7 | Hyatt Regency Atlanta, Marriott Marquis, Atlanta Hilton, Sheraton | 30,000+ |
| 2010 | September 3 – September 6 | Hyatt Regency Atlanta, Marriott Marquis, Atlanta Hilton, Sheraton | 30,000+ |
| 2011 | September 2 – September 5 | Hyatt Regency Atlanta, Marriott Marquis, Atlanta Hilton, Sheraton, Westin Peachtree Plaza | 46,000+ |
| 2012 | August 31 – September 3 | Hyatt Regency Atlanta, Marriott Marquis, Atlanta Hilton, Sheraton, Westin Peachtree Plaza | 53,000+ |
| 2013 | August 30 – September 2 | Hyatt Regency Atlanta, Marriott Marquis, Atlanta Hilton, Sheraton, Westin Peachtree Plaza, AmericasMart | 57,000+ |
| 2014 | August 29 – September 1 | Hyatt Regency Atlanta, Marriott Marquis, Atlanta Hilton, Sheraton, Westin Peachtree Plaza, AmericasMart | 62,000+ |
| 2015 | September 4 – September 7 | Hyatt Regency Atlanta, Marriott Marquis, Atlanta Hilton, Sheraton, Westin Peachtree Plaza, AmericasMart | 70,000+ |
| 2016 | September 2 – September 5 | Hyatt Regency Atlanta, Marriott Marquis, Atlanta Hilton, Sheraton, Westin Peachtree Plaza, AmericasMart | 77,000+ |
| 2017 | August 31 – September 4 | Hyatt Regency Atlanta, Marriott Marquis, Atlanta Hilton, Sheraton, Westin Peachtree Plaza, AmericasMart | 80,000+ |
| 2018 | August 30 – September 3 | Hyatt Regency Atlanta, Hilton Atlanta, Marriott Marquis, Sheraton, Westin Peachtree Plaza, AmericasMart 1 & 2 | 80,000 |
| 2019 | August 29 – September 5 | Hyatt Regency Atlanta, Hilton Atlanta, Marriott Marquis, Sheraton, Westin Peachtree Plaza, AmericasMart 1 & 2 | 85,000+ |
| 2020 | September 3 – September 7 | Held online due to the COVID-19 pandemic. | |
| 2021 | September 2 – September 6 | Hyatt Regency Atlanta, Hilton Atlanta, Marriott Marquis, Sheraton, Westin Peachtree Plaza, AmericasMart 1 & 2 | 42,000 |
| 2022 | September 1 – September 5 | Hyatt Regency Atlanta, Hilton Atlanta, Marriott Marquis, Sheraton, Westin Peachtree Plaza, AmericasMart 2 & 3 | 65,000 |
| 2023 | August 31 – September 4 | Hyatt Regency Atlanta, Hilton Atlanta, Marriott Marquis, Courtland Grand Hotel (Formerly Sheraton), Westin Peachtree Plaza, AmericasMart 2 & 3 | 70,000+ |
| 2024 | August 29 – September 2 | Hyatt Regency Atlanta, Hilton Atlanta, Marriott Marquis, Courtland Grand Hotel (Formerly Sheraton), Westin Peachtree Plaza, AmericasMart 2 & 3 | 72,000 |
| 2025 | August 28 – September 1 | Hyatt Regency Atlanta, Hilton Atlanta, Marriott Marquis, Courtland Grand Hotel (Formerly Sheraton), Westin Peachtree Plaza, AmericasMart 2 & 3 | 75,000+ |
| 2026 | September 3 – September 7 | Hyatt Regency Atlanta, Hilton Atlanta, Marriott Marquis, Courtland Grand Hotel (Formerly Sheraton), Westin Peachtree Plaza, AmericasMart 2 & 3 | 75,000 |

== Scheduled events ==
=== Programming ===
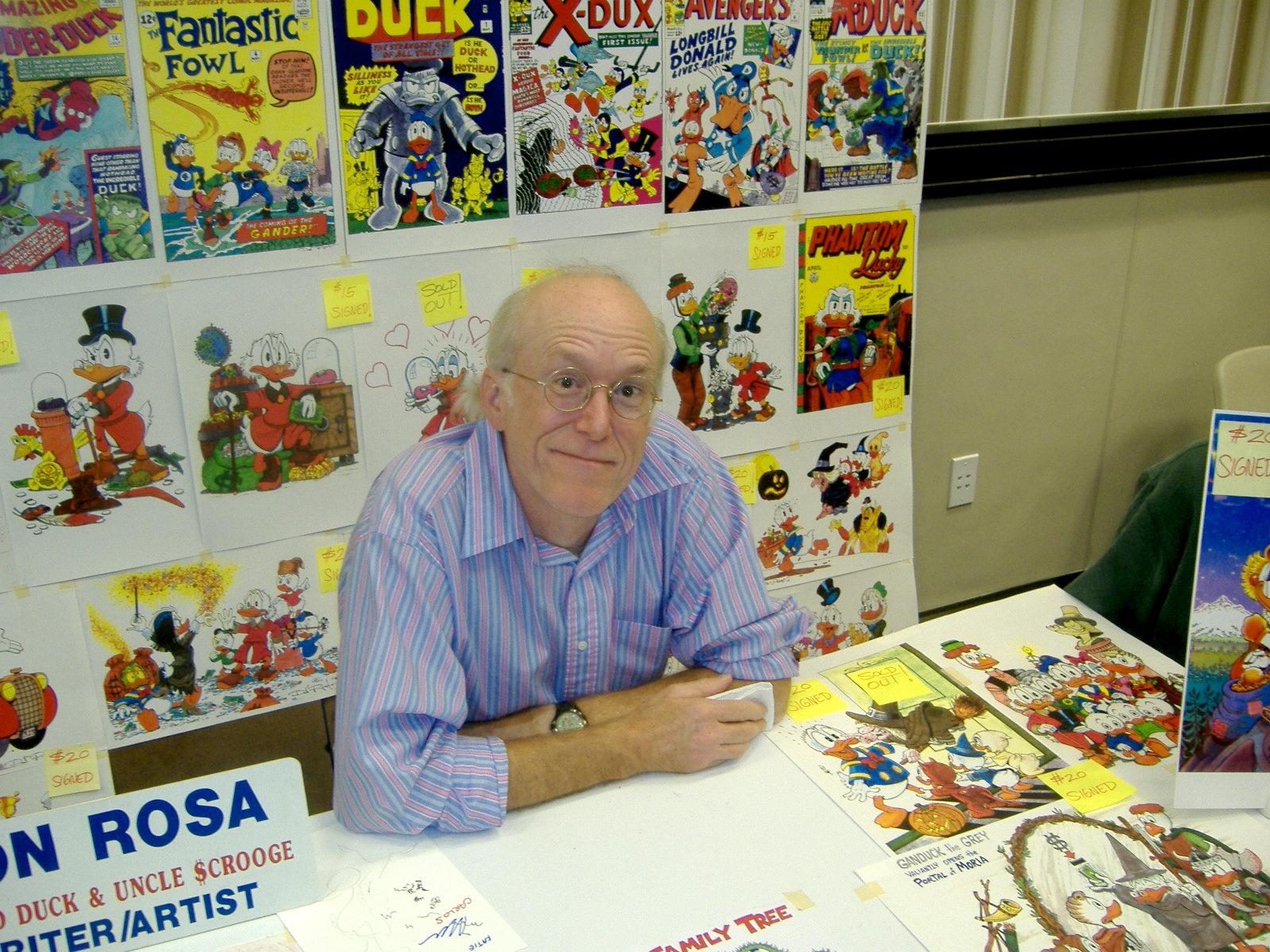
Artist Don Rosa at the artist area of Dragon Con in 2009

Mercer Patterson performing on the Concourse Stage at Dragon Con 2026

As of 2008, Dragon Con was a four-day event comprising approximately 3500 hours of panels, seminars, demonstrations, and workshops, with over 30 specialized programming tracks that include writing, alternate history, art, anime, gaming, science fiction and fantasy literature, comic books, costuming, space, science, online media, independent film, podcasting, Asian cinema and culture, robotics, filk, scientific skepticism, Star Trek, Star Wars, Military Scifi Media, X-Files, apocalyptic themes, Anne McCaffrey's Pern, Robert Jordan's Wheel of Time, J. R. R. Tolkien's The Lord of the Rings, British and American science fiction television, dark fantasy, the Dragon Con Independent Short Film Festival, and general programming which specific Guests of Honor attend (e.g., Clive Barker's Lost Souls and Storm Constantine's Grissecon).

As of 2017, Dragon Con is a five-day event, beginning the Thursday before Labor Day.

=== Music and film ===
From its origin, music has also been a significant feature of Dragon Con, with performances by groups and artists such as Abney Park, Blue Öyster Cult, The Crüxshadows, Celldweller, Ego Likeness, I:Scintilla, Black Tape for a Blue Girl, Bella Morte, Chick Corea, Edgar Winter, Emerald Rose, Ghost of the Robot, Godhead, Iced Earth, Voltaire, Jefferson Starship, The Misfits, Gwar, Man or Astroman?, The Bloodhound Gang, Spock's Beard, and Mindless Self Indulgence.

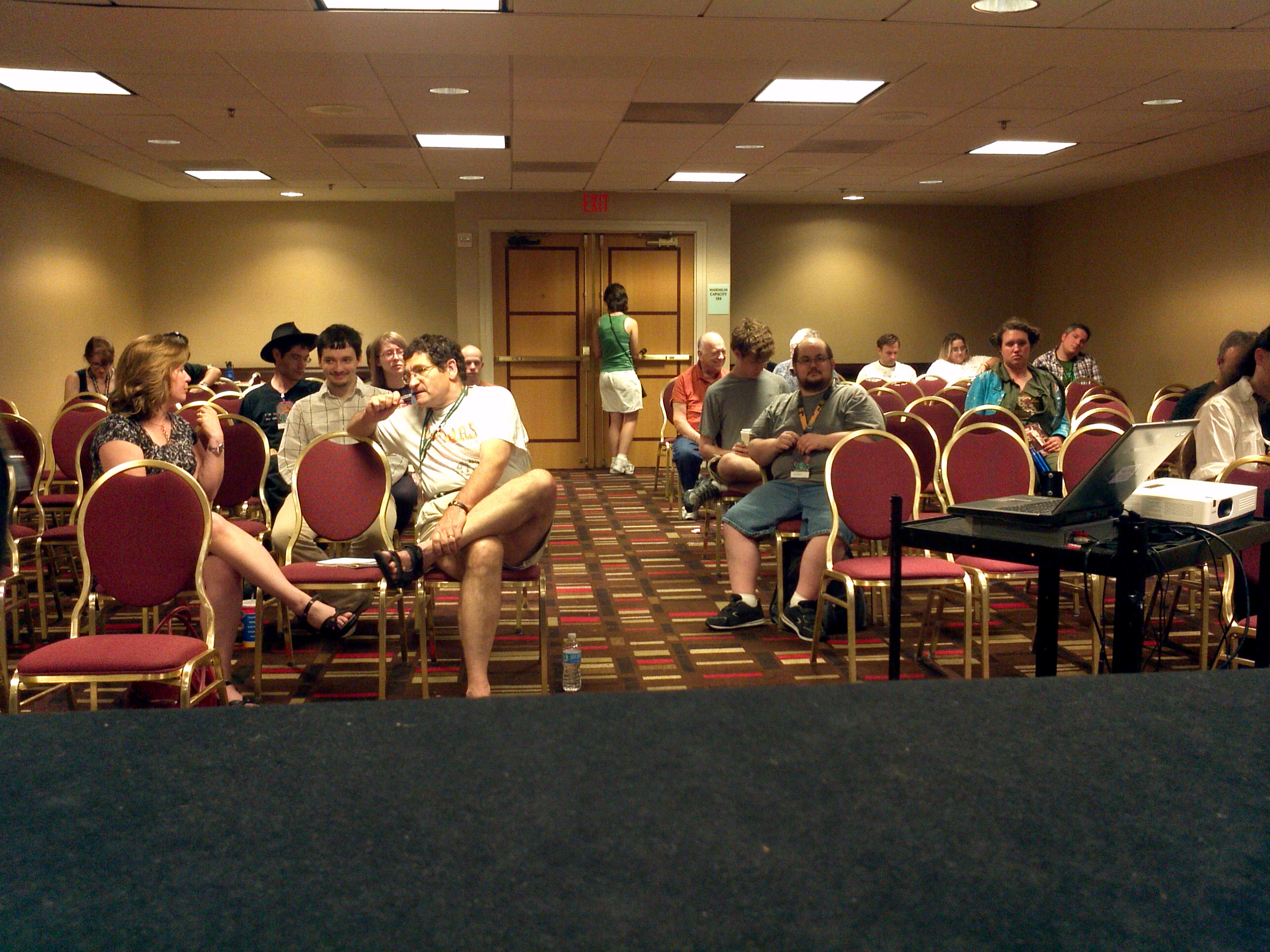
Audience for a 2011 Dragon*Con Panel

The Dragon Con Independent Short Film Festival presents the "finest independent short films of the fantastic". Awards are distributed for a number of categories.

=== Gaming ===
Dragon Con hosts a variety of gaming sessions and tournaments. These include board games, miniature games, collectible card games, console games, live action and other role-playing games, tables hosted by gaming companies, and panel sessions.

=== Awards ===
In 1998, Dragon Con established the Julie Award, in honor of Julius "Julie" Schwartz, bestowed by a panel of industry professionals in honor of "universal achievement spanning multiple genres". Schwartz presented the award each year prior to his death in early 2004. The inaugural recipient was Ray Bradbury; additional recipients of the award include Forrest Ackerman, Yoshitaka Amano, Alice Cooper, Will Eisner, Harlan Ellison, Neil Gaiman, Carmine Infantino, Anne McCaffrey, Jim Steranko, Peter David, and Paul Dini.

In March 2016, Dragon Con announced the introduction of "Dragon Awards", a fan-voted award "to recognize outstanding achievement in science fiction and fantasy literature, comics, gaming and filmed entertainment". The award process consists of a nomination step, where each voter can nominate one work of choice in every category, and a voting step where the nominated works are voted for to receive the award. The nominations and votes are collected electronically. Participation is freely available to everyone, without cost or requirement of membership. The finalist shortlist for the first edition of the awards was announced on August 11, 2016; the winners were announced on September 4.

Additional awards include the Futura Award, paying homage to the Fritz Lang masterpiece Metropolis; the Parsec Awards; and the Georgia Fandom Award, renamed in 2008 as the Hank Reinhardt Award, after its first recipient.

=== Parade ===
In 2002, Dragon Con began hosting a parade through downtown Atlanta, which ran from Centennial Olympic Park to the Marriott Marquis, and featured thousands of costumed participants. The parade is an annual event, televised by WUPA-TV and streamed online.

== Economic impact ==
In 2015, Dragon Con attracted some 70,000+ attendees and had a direct economic impact of $65 million, as reported by the Atlanta Convention & Visitors Bureau in the Atlanta Business Chronicle. According to statistics provided by Georgia State University, Robinson College of Business, Dragon Con brought in over $21 million.

Dragon Con routinely raises funds for designated charities. In 2005, Dragon*Con raised US$20,000 for the Leukemia & Lymphoma Society. Charity efforts continued with US$104,000 sent to the Atlanta Center for Self Sufficiency in 2016, including a US$50,000 corporate match. In 2013, fans voted in advance to determine the charities. From 2005 through 2012, the con raised and donated almost $224,000. In 2026, Dragon Con raised US$320,000 for Hope Atlanta.

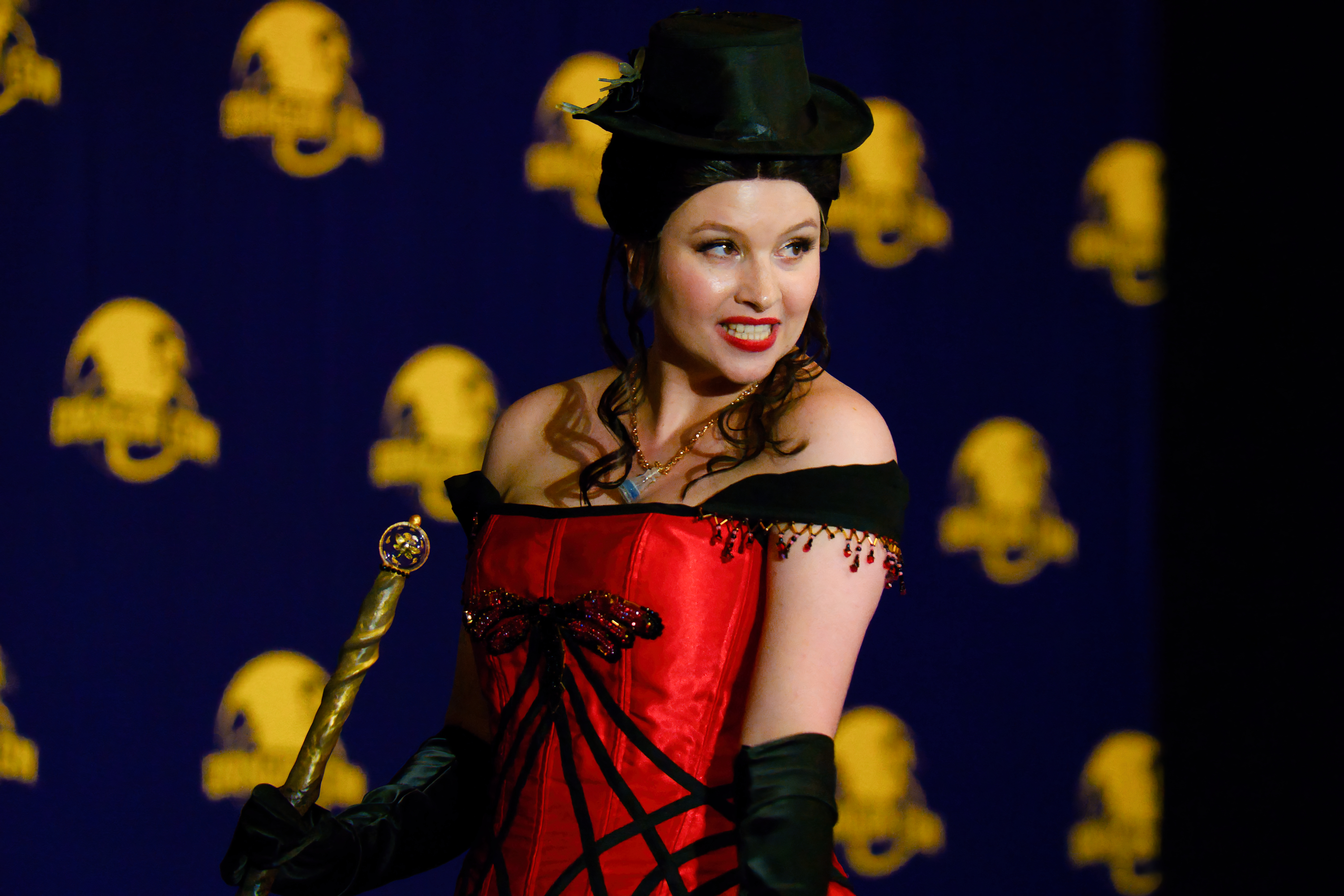
Cosplayer competing in the Page to Stage Contest, 2023

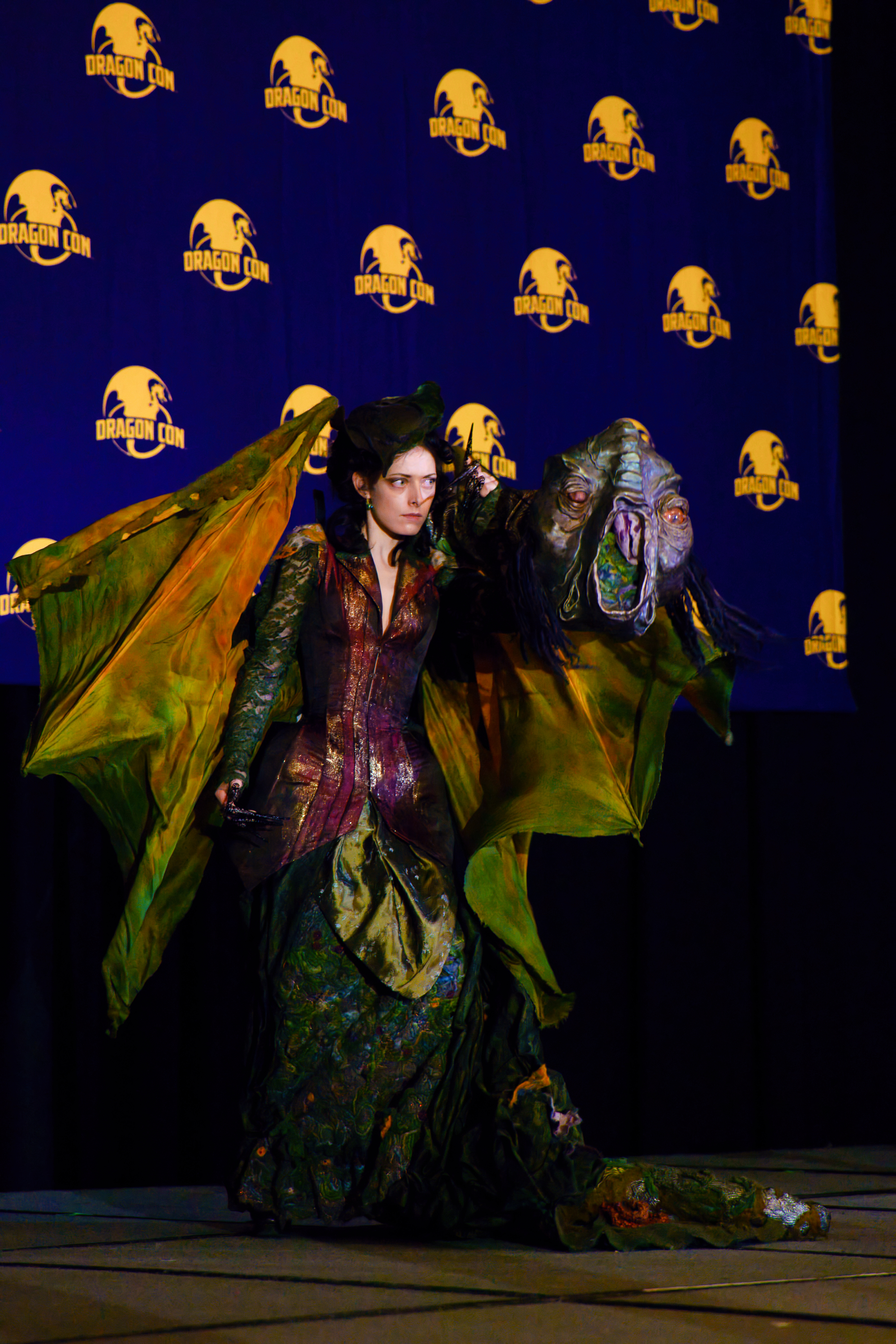
A cosplayer competing in the Page to Stage Contest, 2023

| Preceded by 5th North American Science Fiction Convention; ConDiego in San Diego, United States (1990) | List of NASFiCs; 6th North American Science Fiction Convention; Dragon*Con in Atlanta, United States (1995) | Succeeded by 7th North American Science Fiction Convention; Conucopia in Los Angeles, United States (1999) |
