= Infinite Archive =

2025 science fiction novel by Mur Lafferty

- 1st edition cover
- Author: Mur Lafferty
- Language: English
- Series: The Midsolar Murders
- Genre: Science fiction, mystery
- Publisher: Ace Books
- Publication date: 2025
- Publication place: United States
- Media type: Print (paperback)
- Pages: 352
- ISBN: 978-0-593-09815-8
- Preceded by: Chaos Terminal

Infinite Archive is a science fiction mystery novel by Mur Lafferty, sequel to her earlier novel Chaos Terminal and the third novel in the Midsolar Murders series. It was first published in trade paperback by Ace Books in July 2025.

== Summary ==
After months of quiet on space station Eternity, detective and author Mallory Viridian, who originally came there to get away from the seemingly endless series of homicide investigations that came her way on Earth, is getting bored. This ends when her visiting literary agent, arriving to discuss new deals, is murdered. Her search for the killer is beset by such complications as a plethora of suspects, a space mystery convention, the internet, alien influencers, difficulties with the Sundry, and the mischievousness of the small intelligent spaceship she has been caring for.

== Reception ==
Kristi Chadwick in Library Journal writes the book's "fast pace still leaves room for continuing character subplots and snappy dialogue," and "[r]eaders will be delighted to see familiar characters return, causing trouble in their helpful ways."
