= Station Eternity =

2022 science fiction novel by Mur Lafferty

- Author: Mur Lafferty
- Language: English
- Series: The Midsolar Murders
- Genre: Science fiction, mystery
- Publisher: Ace Books
- Publication date: 2022
- Publication place: United States
- Media type: Print (paperback)
- ISBN: 978-0-593-09811-0
- Followed by: Chaos Terminal

Station Eternity is a science fiction mystery novel by Mur Lafferty. It was first published in trade paperback by Ace Books in October 2022. The novel is the first instalment in the Midsolar Murders series. A sequel, Chaos Terminal, was published in 2023.

== Summary ==
Mallory Viridian lives on a space station called Eternity, with several different alien species. She is one of only three humans on the station, the others being an old friend Xan (born Alexander Morgan) and Adrian Casserley-Berry, the official ambassador from Earth. Xan lives inside a docked shuttle ship, the Infinity, and is a refugee from Earth. The exact location of Eternity is never disclosed, although ships get to it from Earth using hyperdrive.

Among the aliens on board are the Gneiss, who are large creatures made of living rock, the Phantasmagore, and the Sundry, an insect species with a hive mind. The Phantasmagore can blend in with any background. They act as station security, able to watch without being seen. Mallory earns credit to buy food and accommodation by allowing the Sundry to examine her as a biological specimen.

Eternity itself is a living creature, who communicates with others through "Ren", a symbiotic partner from the Gurudev species. Almost all the alien species except humans live in symbiosis with other species, sometimes from their home world, sometimes from other worlds altogether. Communication is only possible through an implant in Mallory's head, which tends to translate alien concepts into the nearest human equivalent, including the names of the various species and individuals of those species. Thus her closest friend among the Gneiss is known to her as "Stephanie".

For most of her life Mallory has been dogged by a series of coincidences in which people nearby were murdered. Mallory was able to solve the crimes using an odd intuition, along with an ability to absorb detail and spot connections between people. One of the murders involved Xan, possibly as the perpetrator. Xan ran from the scene and was abducted by an alien ship. At the time he was a quartermaster in the US military, but as the novel unfolds it becomes apparent that he, like several other characters, was not what he seemed. The series of murders ruined Mallory's life, disrupting her education and forcing her to avoid social contact. Having made money in the only way she could, by turning her experiences into a series of successful mystery novels, she went to a scenic area known to attract alien visitors, and hitched a ride to Eternity.

Mallory learns that a shuttle is arriving from Earth with a diplomatic delegation and a selection of tourists. She tries to stop this by appealing to Ambassador Adrian, the Gneiss, and Ren, to no avail. As the shuttle approaches, chaos breaks out on Eternity and the shuttle is attacked. Only the tourists survive. As the casualties are assembled in the medical bay, Mallory realizes that all are connected to her, Xan, or both. This makes all of them potential murderers or victims. Ren was killed and apparently replaced by Adrian, who is now incapacitated. One of the tourists was poisoned before the shuttle was attacked.

In flashbacks the various characters and the connections between them are described. Mallory has to unravel the mystery before more people die, or Eternity itself is destroyed.

== Awards ==
The novel placed 12th in the 2022 Goodreads Choice Awards

== Reception ==
Publishers Weekly gave the novel a lukewarm review: "Lafferty (Six Wakes) tries to amalgamate a near-future sci-fi setting and a murder mystery plot into a breathless space adventure, but it never quite takes off. "

Alexandra Pierce at Locus Magazine was more enthusiastic: "Station Eternity balances both the science fiction elements – meeting aliens, understanding how to work with them – and the mystery elements very evenly; it genuinely works as both genres (and works best as both)."

== Sequel ==
A sequel, Chaos Terminal, was published in 2023.
