= DragonConTV =

In-house video production studio

DragonConTV (alternately DragonCon.TV or DCTV; previously Dragon*Con TV) is an in-house video production and television studio run by volunteers as part of Dragon Con. DragonConTV broadcasts original content, fan-submitted content, and live coverage of convention guest panels and performances. The broadcast is viewable during the convention on the five host hotels' in-house television channels and online with a convention "streaming membership". Content is also viewable on-demand after the convention to members with the streaming membership.

Over the years, DragonConTV has become known to convention-goers for its parodies of popular culture and of Dragon Con culture itself. Volunteers produce new content for the convention each year, including "produced segments reporting on con events, parody music videos, skits, and a bevy of bumps." This content, along with a selection of previous years', is played in between guest panels at the convention and on the streaming broadcast.

== History ==
Prior to 2002, video operations at Dragon Con consisted mainly of projecting the panel guests onto screens in the same room. No video was recorded or broadcast, except the Sunday night Masquerade Costume Contest which was broadcast via analog signal on an in-house "dark channel" in the Hyatt Regency Atlanta only.

=== 2002 ===
In 2002, Dragon Con booked Kevin Murphy and Michael J. Nelson of Mystery Science Theater 3000 as guests and hosts of the Masquerade. During the convention, volunteers wrote and rendered an introduction video which mixed references to Star Wars, Monty Python, and MST3K. After its success with the audience, convention co-chair Pat Henry asked the volunteers to repeat their effort the following year, promising them the entire 30-minute block before the contest.

=== 2003–2008 ===
From 2003 to 2008, DragonConTV took form. For the Masquerade "pre-show" in 2003, DCTV volunteers created fake advertisements and commercials, including "Stormtroopers Gone Wild", a Star Wars-themed parody of the "Girls Gone Wild" infomercials. They also added broadcast capability to the Atlanta Marriott Marquis via a temporary microwave link. In 2004, the team shot a longer parody of a local newscast to play before the Masquerade, along with several new fake commercials, "bumpers" in the style of Cartoon Network's Adult Swim interstitials, and other parody spots.

In 2005, Dragon Con officially formed a Videography department to handle video recording and broadcast at the convention. Although this department was technically separate from DragonConTV, most volunteers overlapped between the two, creating new content before the convention as part of DragonConTV and volunteering during the convention to help run videography operations. That year, the Hilton Atlanta was added both as a recording location and a broadcast site on the hotel channels, and the microwave link to the Marriott Marquis was replaced with a fiber optic connection.

From 2006 to 2008, DragonConTV began airing short interviews with convention guests and playing fan-submitted content on the DCTV channel, in addition to original content and convention panels. The Sheraton Atlanta was added as a host hotel in 2008, so recording and broadcast capabilities were extended.

=== 2009–2015 ===
Over the next several years, DragonConTV expanded its original content to focus more on the culture of Dragon Con itself. In 2009, DragonConTV added "The Dragon Con Late Show", a daily live show each morning highlighting the day's guests, activities, and schedule changes. The team also began roaming the convention recording "highlights" and "news segments" for later broadcast, as well as expanding the guest interviews. In 2014, DragonConTV also broadcast the Dragon Con Parade live for the first time.

Hotel channels in the Westin Peachtree Plaza were added in 2011, and in 2015, a second channel, "DCTVLand", was added to highlight past content and allow for more fan-submitted content to be aired. This additional channel aired in all five host hotels, and beginning in 2016, in the Omni Atlanta and Ritz-Carlton Atlanta as well.

=== 2016–2019 ===
In 2016, DragonConTV premiered a livestreaming option: convention attendees could add a "streaming membership" to their existing convention membership for access to the live broadcast stream during the convention and on-demand content for the three months following. In 2017, streaming memberships were made available to anyone, regardless of whether or not they attended the physical convention. On the content side, the team also added a daily "Dragon Con Update" live show, continued to air original and fan-submitted content (including the film Fatal Future), and, in 2018, streamed live band performances for the first time.

=== 2020 ===
In July 2020, with the Covid-19 pandemic restricting massive gatherings, Dragon Con announced the cancellation of the 2020 convention to be replaced with an online version, "Dragon Con Goes Virtual". As part of the online offering, DragonConTV streamed three channels 24/7 over the traditional Labor Day weekend dates: a Main Programming channel consisting of guest panels and special events such as the Dragon Con Parade and Masquerade; a Fan Tracks channel with new panels contributed by the 30+ fan tracks; and a DCTVLand "Classics" channel featuring the best panels from years past. Volunteers recorded and edited panels, added Dragon Con Goes Virtual branding, developed the new streaming workflow, and monitored all three streams through the weekend. Although most panels were pre-recorded, some content aired live, and volunteers passed along questions from viewers to the panelists.

Unlike past DCTV streaming content, which required fans to purchase a membership for online access, Dragon Con Goes Virtual streamed entirely free for the four-day weekend. Fans in 49 countries watched via dragoncon.tv, a Vimeo channel, and a Roku channel created especially for the event. On-demand access to the content remained available with the streaming membership following the convention's conclusion.

== Content ==
In addition to airing more than 1000 hours of Dragon Con guest panels, DragonConTV has filmed, edited, and broadcast hundreds of original videos. Most DragonConTV original content falls into one or more of these categories:

- Live/News: The Dragon Con Late Show, the Dragon Con Update, guest interviews, and convention highlights
- Sketches: original short-form comedy parodying various films, television shows, books, products, etc.
- Music Videos: filmed by DCTV volunteers for several Jonathan Coulton songs in addition to original parodies of songs by Talking Heads ("Quarantine Days Go By"), Taylor Swift ("Sold It Off"), the Beatles ("Ramen, Franks, and Beans"), Adele ("A Dragon Con Hello"), and Macklemore ("Comic Book Shop"), among others
- Bumpers: text-only (or primarily text) comedic interstitials based loosely on Cartoon Network's Adult Swim "bumps"
- Fan-Submitted Content: sketches, music videos, commercials, and longer-form content submitted by creators not on the DCTV volunteer team

DragonConTV's parodic content has referenced Star Wars, Star Trek, Battlestar Galactica, What We Do in the Shadows, Game of Thrones, the Muppets, various infomercials, Mad Max, Raiders of the Lost Ark, the Avengers, Doctor Who, and the Matrix, among many other movies, television shows, and comic books. Most of these videos are archived on the DragonConTV YouTube channel.
