= Podcast Pickle =

Podcast directory

Podcast Pickle, launched in March 2005 by Gary Leland, was both a podcast/vidcast directory and community. Time magazine listed it as one of its 50 "coolest" sites in August, 2006. More than 12,000 podcasts and vidcasts appeared on the site as of March 2007. Podcast Pickle provided podcast family-tree listings, podcast players that work on external sites, blogs, profiles, and community forums. The site was shut down in 2015.

== Mentions in media ==
Podcast Pickle has been written about in the following books: Podcasting For Dummies and The Business Podcasting Bible. Gary Leland has also been quoted in the books Tricks of The Podcast Masters and Promoting Your Podcast.

== Awards ==
- Podcast Pickle was a finalist for the 2006 Webby Awards.
