= Escape Pod =

Science fiction podcast

- The official Escape Pod logo
- Genre: Sci-fi Short Stories

Publication
- Original release: 16 May 2005
- Updates: Weekly
- License: Creative Commons 4.0, Attribution, Noncommercial, No Derivative Works

Related
- Website: escapepod.org

Escape Pod is a science fiction podcast magazine produced by Escape Artists Foundation. It proclaims itself "the world's leading science fiction podcast". The present co-editors are Mur Lafferty and Valerie Valdes.

While episodes are free, the company runs on listener donations and sponsorship.

== Podcast history ==
Escape Pod launched on 12 May 2005 with founder Serah Eley filling all roles. Writer Jeremiah Tolbert later joined as editor. Serah Eley announced her retirement on 26 April 2010. Her last appearance was Episode 240 on 12 May 2010.

Mur Lafferty assumed both producer and hosting roles at Escape Pod with Episode 241. Effective 1 January 2013, Mur Lafferty stepped down as editor, keeping her association with Escape Artists, Inc. On 18 December 2012, at Escape Pod's site, Mur published "Announcing the new editor of Escape Pod!", naming co-host Norm Sherman the new editor and Alasdair Stuart interim editor until Sherman assumed his new role. Escape Pod confirmed Mur's departure in the introduction for Episode 377, on 3 January 2013.

Near the end of 2013, the company announced that due to a combination of increased listener demand and a decline in contributions, they were three months from insolvency. After overwhelming response from listeners, it was announced that the company was fully funded for at least ten months, and that the company had been purchased by Pseudopod host, Alasdair Stuart.

In May 2017, Norm Sherman stepped down as editor. Mur Lafferty and S. B. Divya, who was previously the assistant editor, became co-editors. Benjamin C. Kinney assumed the role of assistant editor. In November 2021, Premee Mohamed assumed the role of co-assistant editor. In March 2022, S. B. Divya stepped down, and Valerie Valdes became co-editor along with Mur Lafferty.

In August 2023, Benjamin C. Kinney stepped down, and Kevin Wabaunsee took his place as co-assistant editor. In April 2025, Premee Mohamed stepped down and was replaced by Phoebe Barton. In May 2026, Kevin Wabaunsee stepped down and was succeeded by Christine Amsden.

== Escape Artists Foundation ==
Escape Artists, Inc. was a Georgian corporation established 21 February 2006 by Serah Eley to produce Escape Pod and sister podcasts, Pseudopod and PodCastle. It is distinct from Escape Artists Productions, LLC. The company was purchased in July 2014 by Alasdair Stuart and Dan Sawyer. As of January 2016, Escape Artists added a fourth podcast, as Cast of Wonders joined the company. The company became the Escape Artists Foundation, a US 501(c)(3) nonprofit, in January 2023.

=== Sister podcasts ===
Escape Pod has four sister podcasts:

- Pseudopod is dedicated to horror fiction
- PodCastle is dedicated to fantasy fiction
- Cast of Wonders features young adult speculative fiction
- Cats Cast features speculative cat fiction

=== Ezine ===
Escape Artists produced an ezine, Mothership Zeta. Six issues were released, the editor was Mur Lafferty. It went on hiatus in 2016.

== Content ==
Escape Pod features several types of content. A science fiction story is presented weekly in audio and text. On rare occasions, other types of content have been made available on Escape Pod, such as metacasts (episodes discussing the achievements and future plans of the show itself), the year's Hugo Award nominees, an interview, book and movie reviews, PDFs for Playing for Keeps by Mur Lafferty and Infected by Scott Sigler, and a special issue for flash fiction less than 1500 words.

=== Short fiction ===
The weekly story is usually between 2000 and 6000 words in length.

In 2008, Escape Pod refocused its attention back to its science fiction roots, leaving horror, fantasy, and young adult stories to the sister podcasts. In 2018, Escape Pod began running longer stories across 2 to 4 episodes.

=== Music ===
Escape Pod's music is provided by surf rock band Daikaiju with the band's permission. The opening theme is the instrumental song "The Final Phase", and the closing theme is "Choujikuu Mitsukai" ("Super-Dimensional Angels"). Both are from the album The Phasing Spider Menace.

=== Narration ===
Stories are read by people associated with Escape Pod as well as voice actors and members of the podcasting community. Narrations are mostly presented in an audio-book style with a single reader and no special effects. Escape Pod generally does not have authors read their own works.

== Reception ==
The podcast has been a finalist for the Parsec Award four times for Best Speculative Fiction Story (Short Form), once for Best Speculative Fiction Story: Small Cast (Novella & Long Form), and twice for Best Speculative Fiction Magazine or Anthology Podcast.

Escape Pod was first nominated for the Hugo Award for Best Semiprozine in 2018. It was nominated again in 2020 and then continuously for every year up to 2026.

Short fiction audio podcast magazines like Escape Pod and its sister publications, Pseudopod and PodCastle, have caught the interest and imagination of fiction enthusiasts, and doing a wonderful job at reviving awareness in both new short fiction and classic works

— Eugie Foster, The UK SF Book News Network

== SFWA qualification ==
Escape Pod is considered a professional market by the Science Fiction and Fantasy Writers of America (SFWA), and publication in it count towards qualifying authors for association membership. Writers are paid according to the market guidelines established by SFWA.

== Distribution and rights ==
Escape Pod is distributed under the Creative Commons attribution non-commercial no-derivatives 4.0 license. This means that episodes are available at no cost and can be redistributed but not sold or modified. Any of the show's episodes may be downloaded individually from Escape Pod's website or received via a podcatcher.

The fiction itself remains copyrighted by its respective authors. Escape Pod contracts with the authors for non-exclusive audio rights, paying semi-professional rates.

Escape Pod sold five collections of their podcasts at PodDisc, a CD fulfillment site that closed in 2016. Disc One contains episodes 1 through 26. Disc Two contains 27 through 52. Disc Three contains episodes 53 through 78. Disc Four contains episodes 79 through 104. Disc Five contains episodes 105 through 130.
