= Lucy Hounsom =

British author

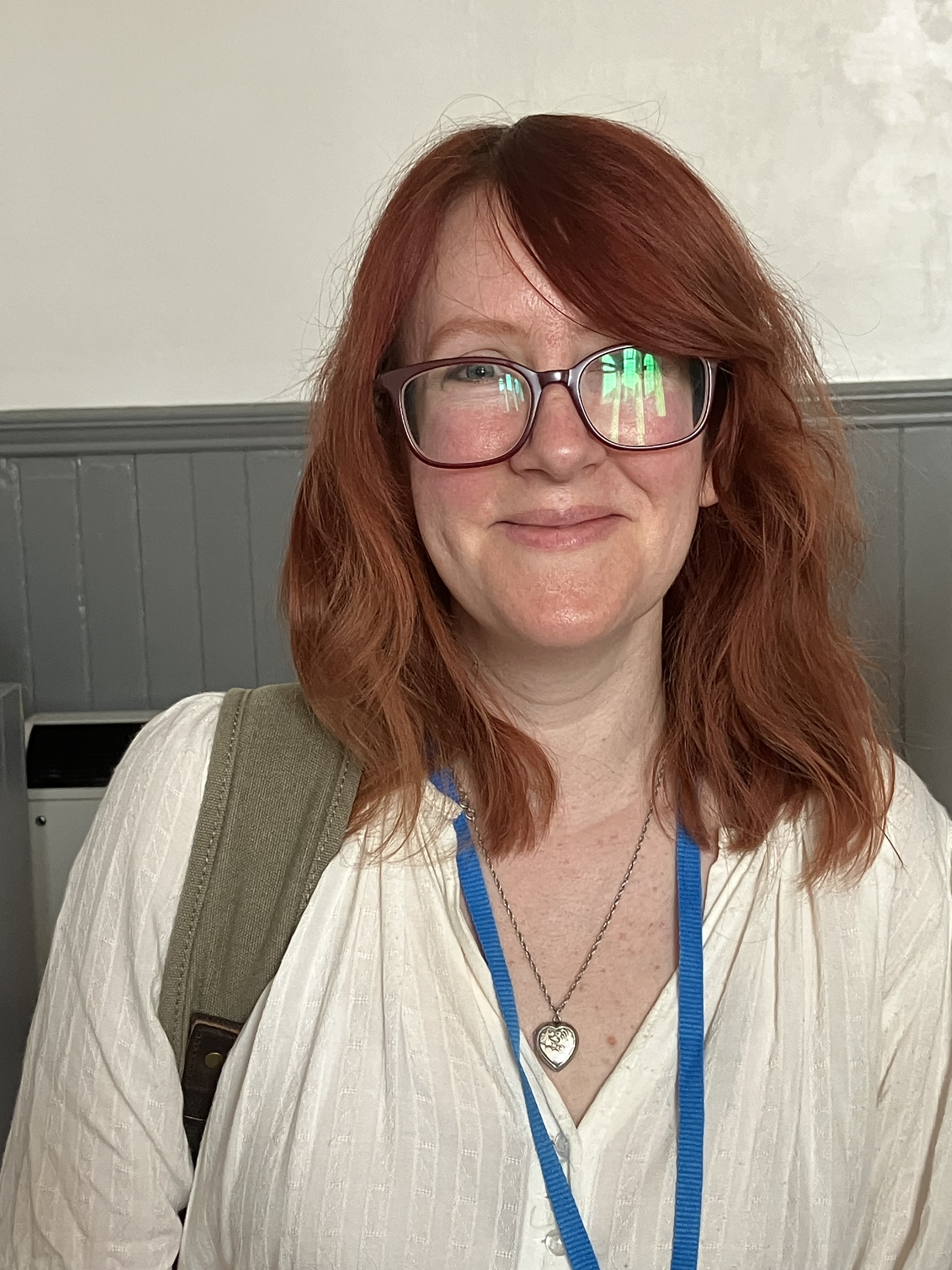
- Lucy Hounsom at Cymera festival, 2024.
- Born: Lucy Claire Hounsom; April 1986 (age 40)
- Education: Royal Holloway, University of London
- Occupation: Author
- Writing career
- Pen name: Lucy Holland

Lucy Claire Hounsom (born April 1986) is a British author of fantasy and myth, who also writes under the name Lucy Holland. She is best known for her 2021 novel, Sistersong. She also co-hosts British Fantasy Award-winning feminist podcast Breaking the Glass Slipper.

== Biography ==
Hounsom grew up in the Thames Valley of Berkshire and attended Redroofs Theatre School in Maidenhead. Though she initially trained as an actress and dancer, Hounsom wrote stories from an early age, and named Alan Garner, Tolkien, Terry Pratchett and David Eddings as her influences. She went on to graduate with a Bachelor of Arts (BA) in English and Creative Writing from Royal Holloway, University of London. She then pursued a Master of Arts (MA) under Andrew Motion.

Hounsom worked as a bookseller for Waterstones for twelve years before becoming a full-time author. Her debut novel Starborn was published by Tor after having been discovered by an intern on an agent's slush pile. It was followed by two further novels, Heartland and Firestorm, completing the Worldmaker Trilogy.

Under the pen name Lucy Holland, she went on in 2021 to write Sistersong, a novel loosely based on the child ballad Twa Sisters, which was followed in 2024 by Song of the Huntress.

In 2009, Hounsom moved to Sidmouth, Devon with her parents. Her younger sister, also a novelist, writes under the name Laura Madeleine.

== Themes ==
Hounsom's writing covers themes such as gender roles, reimagining myths, and the different concepts of heroism, as well as "the search for identity, and our lost connection with nature."

== Reception ==
Starborn was shortlisted in the 2016 Gemmell Awards for Best Fantasy Debut. The Independent listed it among the best fantasy debuts of 2015. Sistersong was a finalist for the Goldsboro Books Glass Bell Award and the British Fantasy Award for Best Novel in 2022. The AU Review describes it as: "authentic and well researched... the writing is as strong and beautiful as you could hope for, and the folkloric end result is fantastic."

== Bibliography ==
=== The Worldmaker Trilogy ===
- 2015: Lucy Hounsom (2015). Starborn: The Worldmaker Trilogy: Book One. Tor. p. 300. ISBN 978-1447268451.
- 2017: Lucy Hounsom (2017). Heartland: The Worldmaker Trilogy: Book Two. Pan. p. 496. ISBN 9781447268628.
- 2017: Lucy Hounsom (2017). Firestorm: The Worldmaker Trilogy: Book Three. Pan. p. 512. ISBN 978-1509840519.

=== Standalones ===
- 2021: Lucy Holland (2021). Sistersong. Macmillan. p. 416. ISBN 978-1529039030.
- 2024: Lucy Holland (2024). Song of the Huntress. Macmillan. p. 432. ISBN 978-1529077407.
