= Hope Atlanta =

HOPE Atlanta, the programs of Travelers Aid of Metropolitan Atlanta, is a non-profit organization that has served the metro-Atlanta area for 125 years. Since its inception in 1900, the organization has provided services to over one million people in need throughout the counties surrounding Atlanta, Georgia.

HOPE Atlanta is also notable for the role it has played in Atlanta's - and the United States' - history. What began as a one-man operation outside the Atlanta Railroad Depot aiding travelers seeking support and shelter, soon expanded into a widespread effort to help those in need. This expansion began with the adoption of the program by Women's Associations of various denominations in the first decade of the 1900s.

In 1917, various travelers aid programs throughout the United States were united as "Travelers Aid International" The Atlanta service organization is noted for leading this unification. This same year, with the United States' entry into World War I, programs (often referred to as "Troop Transit" efforts) to assist traveling servicemen and their families were put into place.

On March 11, 1919, with the hiring of Sarah Brinson and Maggie Richardson at the Terminal Railroad Station, the then "Travelers Aid of Metropolitan Atlanta" became the first non-profit group in Atlanta to integrate – hiring and serving individuals of all races.

In the years since, the programs of travelers aid have continued to expand and offer various services. For the past 25 years, Atlanta has been a popular destination for relocation east of the Mississippi River, necessitating these continuing services. It is expected that nearly 75,000 people in Georgia will be homeless at some point this year.

These services have expanded beyond the aid for travelers offered by "Travelers Aid International." While these remain as areas of service, HOPE Atlanta also provides assistance to the homeless, help for victims of domestic violence, assistance to HIV/AIDS patients, and crisis management for those in need. The current mission of HOPE Atlanta is four-tiered – to provide Housing, Outreach, Prevention, and Emergency Services. HOPE Atlanta continues to serve more than 15,000 individuals per year, approximately one-third of whom are children.

- The Housing programs include a Transitional Housing Program which provides housing for new residents for up to 24 months; a Permanent Housing Program which provides housing for individuals with disabilities; a Supportive Housing Program for the chronically homeless and homeless women with children; the Gwinnett County Shelter Plus Care Program; and an HIV/AIDS Program.
- The Outreach Program provides outreach and crisis intervention services at the Gateway Center. This center is largely associated with United Way, a supporter of HOPE Atlanta. The PATH (Projects for Assistance in Transition from Homelessness) Program provides both outreach and client case management at a personal level.
- The Prevention programs include a Homeless Prevention Program which addresses crisis issues that could result in homelessness for clients; a Homelessness Prevention and Rapid Re-housing Program; and a First Month's Rent Program to get clients back on their feet.
- The Emergency Services offered include an Emergency Shelter Hotel/Motel Program; Supportive Services for Veteran Families and a Reunification Program to reconnect clients with their homes and support systems; a Domestic Violence Program; and Airport Meet and Greet Services at Hartsfield-Jackson Atlanta International Airport.
