= Pseudopod (podcast) =

Horror podcast

PseudoPod
- Genre: Horror Short Stories

Production
- Length: ~45 minutes

Publication
- No. of episodes: Over 1000
- Original release: 11 August 2006
- Updates: Weekly
- License: Creative Commons Attribution-NonCommercial-NoDerivatives 4.0 International

Reception
- Ratings: 4.5/5

Related
- Website: pseudopod.org

PseudoPod is a podcast launched on 11 August 2006 which presents horror genre short stories. It is part of Escape Artists, Inc. which also produces the podcasts Escape Pod, PodCastle, Cast of Wonders and CatsCast. Pseudopod is co-edited by Kat Day and Alex Hofelich (who became co-editors on October 2025 and May 2015, respectively) and is primarily hosted by Alasdair Stuart with regular support from Kat Day and Associate Editor Scott Campbell.

It was previously edited by Ben Phillips until the end of 2010, and Shawn Garrett until October 2025. Wil Wheaton calls PseudoPod "pretty damn awesome" and cites it as an example of how new media is changing the broadcast landscape.

The stories it runs are usually between 2000 and 6000 words in length. It also releases shorter flash fiction pieces in "Flash on the Borderlands" episodes which contain 3–4 stories, the annual Halloween Parade (written by Alasdair Stuart) and, occasionally, movie reviews. The stories are read by people associated with Escape Artists and other voice artists from the podcasting community.

PseudoPod is distributed under the Creative Commons attribution non-commercial no-derivatives 4.0 license. The fiction itself remains copyrighted by its respective authors. PseudoPod contracts with authors for non-exclusive audio rights.

The show's intro music is "Bloodletting on the Kiss" by Anders Manga.

== Parsec Awards ==
PseudoPod has won the Parsec award twice and has been a finalist six additional times:

- Won the 2009 Parsec Award for Best Speculative Fiction Magazine or Anthology Podcast
- A 2007 Parsec Award Finalist for Best Speculative Fiction Story (Short Form) for "My Caroline" by Matt Wallace
- A 2013 Parsec Award Finalist for Best Speculative Fiction Story: Small Cast (Short Form) for "Final Girl Theory" by A. C. Wise
- Won the 2014 Parsec Award for Best Speculative Fiction Story: Small Cast (Short Form) for "Growth Spurt" by Paul Lorello. It was a finalist for two additional categories including Best Speculative Fiction Story: Large Cast (Short Form) for Four Views of the Big Cigar in Winter by Charlie Bookout and for Best Speculative Fiction Magazine or Anthology Podcast.
- A finalist for the 2015 Parsec Award for Best Speculative Fiction Story: Large Cast (Short Form) for "The Screwfly Solution" by James Tiptree, Jr. and for Best Speculative Fiction Magazine or Anthology Podcast
