= Attribution (copyright) =

Acknowledgement as credit to the holder or author of a work

Creative Commons license symbol for attribution

Attribution, in copyright law, is acknowledgment as credit to the copyright holder or author of a work. If a work is under copyright, there is a long tradition of the author requiring attribution while directly quoting portions of work created by that author.

An author may formally require attribution required via a license, legally preventing others from claiming to have written the work and allowing a copyright holder to retain reputational benefits from having written it. In cases when the copyright holder is the author themselves, this behavior is often moralized as a sign of decency and respect to acknowledge the creator by giving them credit for the work.

This said, a work in the public domain, which is any not covered by copyright, has no such attribution requirement in most parts of the world. This is the distinguishing factor between plagiarism, which is not a crime, but an unethical act, and copyright infringement, which may be a cause of legal action from the author.

== Copyright holder attribution ==
In most countries of the world, copyright holder attribution is not required in the original source material, due to the Berne Convention. The most fundamental form of attribution is the statement of the copyright holder's identity, often in the form Copyright © [year] [copyright holder's name]. In the United States, the preservation of such a notice was formerly an invariable requirement to prevent a work entering the public domain. This changed on March 1, 1989, when the requirement of copyright registration and copyright signment was ended by the Berne Convention Implementation Act of 1988.

== See also ==
- Acknowledgment (creative arts)
- Creative Commons license
- Credit (creative arts)
- Byline
- Signature block
