= George Canyon discography =

- Studio albums: 11
- Compilation albums: 1
- Singles: 33
- Music videos: 23

The discography of Canadian country music artist George Canyon consists of 11 studio albums, one compilation album, 33 singles, and 24 music videos. 29 of his singles have appeared on the RPM, Radio & Records, and Billboard country charts in Canada, including 16 top tens.

== Studio albums ==
=== 1990s and 2000s ===
Title	Album details	Peak positions		Certifications (sales threshold)
Title	Album details	US Country	US Heat	Certifications (sales threshold)
Ironwolf	Release date: 1996; Label: Shoreline Records	—	—	
George Canyon	Release date: 1999; Label: Shoreline Records	—	—	
One Good Friend	Release date: September 28, 2004; Label: Universal South Records	35	23	MC: Platinum
Home for Christmas	Release date: November 8, 2005; Label: Universal South Records	—	—	
Somebody Wrote Love	Release date: September 12, 2006; Label: Universal Canada	—	—	MC: Gold
Classics	Release date: October 9, 2007; Label: Universal Canada	—	—	MC: Gold
What I Do	Release date: November 11, 2008; Label: Universal Canada	—	—	
"—" denotes releases that did not chart

=== 2010s ===
Title	Album details	Peak positions	Certifications
Title	Album details	CAN	Certifications
Better Be Home Soon	Release date: March 22, 2011; Label: Universal Canada	25	MC: Gold
Classics II	Release date: November 20, 2012; Label: Universal Canada	—	
I Got This	Release date: February 5, 2016; Label: Big Star Recordings	39	
Southside of Heaven	Release date: May 25, 2018; Label: Big Star Recordings	—	
"—" denotes releases that did not chart

== Compilation albums ==
Title	Album details
Decade of Hits	Release date: September 9, 2014; Label: Big Star Recordings

== Singles ==
=== 1990s and 2000s ===
Year	Single	Peak positions			Album
Year	Single	CAN Country	CAN	US Country	Album
1999	"Her Everything"	—	—	—	George Canyon
2000	"Enough Said"	71	—	—	George Canyon
2000	"Way Too Much"	—	—	—	George Canyon
2004	"Good Day to Ride"	13	—	—	George Canyon
2004	"I'll Never Do Better Than You"	7	—	—	One Good Friend
2005	"My Name"	4	—	44	One Good Friend
2005	"Who Would You Be"	7	—	—	One Good Friend
2005	"One Good Friend"	6	—	—	One Good Friend
2006	"Somebody Wrote Love"	5	—	—	Somebody Wrote Love
2006	"Drinkin' Thinkin'"	6	—	—	Somebody Wrote Love
2007	"I Want You to Live"	7	76	—	Somebody Wrote Love
2007	"Ring of Fire"	26	—	—	Classics
2008	"Seven Spanish Angels"	46	—	—	Classics
2008	"Just Like You"	4	64	—	What I Do
2009	"All or Nothing"	15	99	—	What I Do
2009	"Let It Out"	9	86	—	What I Do
2009	"Betty's Buns"	10	92	—	What I Do
2009	"In Your Arms Again" (with Crystal Shawanda)	16	—	—	What I Do
"—" denotes releases that did not chart

=== 2010s ===
Year	Single	Peak positions		Album
Year	Single	CAN Country	CAN	Album
2010	"I Believe in Angels"	6	85	What I Do
2010	"Pretty Drunk Out Tonight"	19	—	What I Do
2010	"Better Be Home Soon"	8	87	Better Be Home Soon
2011	"Surrender"	5	98	Better Be Home Soon
2011	"Sunshine"	9	96	Better Be Home Soon
2011	"When Love Is All You've Got" (with Richard Marx)	26	—	Better Be Home Soon
2012	"Saddle Up"	18	—	—N/a
2012	"Rhinestone Cowboy"	33	—	Classics II
2013	"Pancho and Lefty" (with Jim Cuddy)	—	—	Classics II
2013	"Slow Dance"	14	76	Decade of Hits
2014	"Crazy Love"	41	—	Decade of Hits
2015	"I Got This"	8	—	I Got This
2016	"Daughters of the Sun"	8	—	I Got This
2018	"More You"	36	—	Southside of Heaven
"—" denotes releases that did not chart

=== As a featured artist ===
Year	Single	Album
2014	"Story of My Life" (Jordan McIntosh featuring George Canyon)	Steal Your Heart

== Music videos ==
Year	Video	Director
1999	"Her Everything"	
1999	"Enough Said"	
2000	"Way Too Much"	
2004	"I'll Never Do Better Than You"	Kristin Barlowe
2005	"My Name"	Shaun Silva
2005	"One Good Friend"	Margaret Malandruccolo
2006	"Somebody Wrote Love"	
2006	"Drinkin' Thinkin'"	
2007	"I Want You to Live"	
2007	"Ring of Fire"	
2008	"Seven Spanish Angels"	
2008	"Just Like You"	
2009	"Let It Out"	
2009	"Betty's Buns"	
2010	"I Believe in Angels"	
2010	"Better Be Home Soon"	Oswaldo Quiroz/Warren P. Sonoda
2011	"Surrender"	Blake Horobin
2011	"When Love Is All You've Got" (with Richard Marx)	
2012	"Saddle Up"	Warren P. Sonoda
2013	"Pancho and Lefty"	
2013	"Slow Dance" (live)	
2013	"Home for Christmas" (with Aaron Pritchett, One More Girl and Jordan McIntosh)	Stephen Lubig
2014	"Story of My Life" with Jordan McIntosh)	
2016	"Daughters of the Sun"	
