= Classics II (George Canyon album) =

Studio album by George Canyon
- Released: November 20, 2012
- Genre: Country
- Length: 45:33
- Label: Reiny Dawg
- Producers: George Canyon; Jay Buettner

George Canyon chronology
Better Be Home Soon (2011)	Classics II (2012)	Decade of Hits (2014)

Singles from Classics II
- 1. "Rhinestone Cowboy" Released: September 2012; 2. "Pancho and Lefty" Released: February 2013

Classics II is the eighth studio album by Canadian country music artist George Canyon. It was released on November 20, 2012 by Reiny Dawg and distributed by Universal Music Canada.

== Track listing ==
No.	Title	Writer(s)	Length
1.	"Rhinestone Cowboy"	Larry Weiss	3:26
2.	"Tight Fittin' Jeans"	Michael Huffman	2:44
3.	"Blue Eyes Crying in the Rain"	Fred Rose	2:41
4.	"Mama Tried"	Merle Haggard	2:30
5.	"King of the Road"	Roger Miller	2:30
6.	"Pancho and Lefty" (with Jim Cuddy)	Townes Van Zandt	4:39
7.	"Jambalaya (On the Bayou)"	Hank Williams	2:52
8.	"I'm a One-Woman Man"	Tillman Franks, Johnny Horton	2:31
9.	"Today I Started Loving You Again"	Merle Haggard, Bonnie Owens	2:13
10.	"Devil Woman"	Marty Robbins	3:30
11.	"I'm So Lonesome I Could Cry"	Hank Williams	3:18
12.	"She's Gone, Gone, Gone"	Harlan Howard	2:45
13.	"Together Again"	Buck Owens	2:33
14.	"Only Daddy That'll Walk the Line"	Jimmy Bryant	2:39
15.	"Green, Green Grass of Home"	Curly Putman	3:52
Total length:			45:33
