= Lonesome Dove Church =

2014 film

- Directed by: Terry Miles
- Written by: Bob Thielke
- Produced by: Jack Nasser
- Starring: Tom Berenger; Greyston Holt
- Cinematography: Mahlon Todd Williams
- Music by: Colin Aguiar; Peer Taraldsen
- Distributed by: Lionsgate
- Release date: August 4, 2014 (United States)
- Running time: 89 minutes
- Country: Canada
- Language: English

Lonesome Dove Church is a 2014 Canadian Western film directed by Terry Miles and starring Tom Berenger and Greyston Holt.

== Cast ==
- Tom Berenger as John Shepherd
- Greyston Holt as Isaac Shepherd
- Alex Zahara as Butch Henley
- Nicole Oliver as Nancy Shepherd
- Geoff Gustafson as Dutch
- Serge Houde as Charles Stone
- George Canyon as Gorgeous George
- Philip Granger as Pastor Simmons
- Bruce Blain as Hillbilly
- Mike Garthwaite as Jose Sanchez
