= Stagecoach: The Texas Jack Story =

2016 film

- Directed by: Terry Miles
- Written by: Dan Benamor; Matt Williams
- Produced by: Jack Nasser
- Starring: Trace Adkins; Kim Coates; Judd Nelson
- Cinematography: Jan Klompje
- Edited by: Terry Miles
- Music by: Sam Levin
- Production company: NGN Productions
- Distributed by: Cinedigm
- Release date: 4 November 2016
- Running time: 90 minutes
- Country: Canada
- Language: English

Stagecoach: The Texas Jack Story is a 2016 Canadian western film starring Trace Adkins, Kim Coates and Judd Nelson. It is based on the life story of outlaw Nathaniel Reed.

== Plot ==
Nathaniel Reed (Trace Adkins) is a retired outlaw living a quiet life as a rancher under an alias. His peace is shattered when U.S. Marshal Woody Calhoun (Kim Coates) resurfaces, seeking revenge for a past robbery that left him maimed. After a violent raid on his ranch leaves his wife injured and his home destroyed, Reed is forced back into a life of crime.

Reed adopts his old persona, "Texas Jack," and reunites with his former partner, Sid Dalton (Judd Nelson), to carry out a series of stagecoach robberies. Despite his return to the outlaw lifestyle, Reed maintains a code of conduct, refusing to kill during his heists.

The conflict reaches a climax as Calhoun and his bounty hunters close in on the gang. Reed must outmaneuver the vengeful Marshal to protect his family's future and finally put his "Texas Jack" legacy to rest.

== Cast ==
- Trace Adkins as Nathaniel Reed
- Kim Coates as Calhoun
- Judd Nelson as Sid
- Michelle Harrison as Laura Lee Reed
- Helena Marie as Bonnie Mudd
- Claude Duhamel as Frank Bell
- John Emmet Tracy as Hank Holliday
- Garry Chalk as Doc Forrester
- Greg Rogers as Judge York Foley
