= Iron Wolf =

Iron Wolf or Ironwolf may refer to:

- Iron Wolf (roller coaster), a former roller coaster at Six Flags Great America
- Ironwolf, an album by George Canyon
- Ironwolf, a DC Comics character
- Iron Wolf (character), a character in the medieval foundation legend of the city of Vilnius
- Motorised Infantry Brigade Iron Wolf, a unit of the Lithuanian Army
- Iron Wolf (organization), a Lithuanian paramilitary movement formed in 1927
- Tsarevitch Ivan, the Firebird and the Gray Wolf, a Russian fairy tale titled "The Iron Wolf" in Ukrainian variations

== See also ==
- Geležinis Vilkas (disambiguation)
