= Decade of Hits =

Decade of Hits may refer to:

- Decade of Hits: The 30s
- A Decade of Hits, Kenny Rogers, 1997
- Decade of Hits (George Canyon album)
- Keeps Gettin' Better: A Decade of Hits, Christina Aguilera
- A Decade of Hits (Charlie Daniels album), 1983
- A Decade of Hits 1969–1979, Allman Brothers Band, 1991
- Anthology: A Decade of Hits 1988–1998, Dream Warriors
- So Fresh: A Decade of Hits (2000–2009), compilation album in the So Fresh series, 2010
