= I Got This =

I Got This may refer to:

- I Got This (album) by George Canyon, or the title song, 2016
- "I Got This" (Jennifer Hudson song), 2011
- "I Got This", song by Jerrod Niemann, from This Ride, 2017
