= Rabbits (podcast) =

Fictional pseudo-documentary podcast

Publication
- No. of seasons: 2
- No. of episodes: 20
- Original release: 2017

Related
- Related shows: Tanis, The Black Tapes, Faerie
- Website: www.rabbitspodcast.com

Rabbits is a mystery pseudo-documentary podcast. Written and directed by Terry Miles, and published by Pacific Northwest Stories, it is part of their series of podcasts set in the same fictional universe (such as The Black Tapes and Tanis) which, despite being works of fiction, are presented as legitimate true stories both within the podcast and outside of it; the podcast has no credited writers or performers, as the events and characters are framed as real.

The show revolves around a mysterious, dangerous unnamed alternate reality game nicknamed "Rabbits". The first season follows protagonist Carly Parker, who stumbles upon the game while investigating the disappearance of her friend Yumiko. The second season follows a new character, Riley Bennet, who also comes to investigate the game. A main feature of Rabbits is the use of pop culture references, especially to classic video games like Defender and Space Ace.

A second season was announced and its funding was attempted on Kickstarter; while it did not reach its goal, the season was still published on Stitcher Premium. A three episode spin-off miniseries, The Path was available on Apple in 2021, while a novel written by Miles and also titled Rabbits, a stand-alone story set in the same universe, was released on June 8, 2021. A sequel, The Quiet Room, was published in October 2023.

== Episodes ==
=== Season 1 ===
Episode	Title	Release date	Production code
1	"Game On"	February 28, 2017	101
2	"Concernicus Jones"	March 14, 2017	102
3	"Marigold and Persephone"	March 28, 2017	103
4	"Doglover in Hell"	April 11, 2017	104
5	"Priesthood One"	April 25, 2017	105
6	"Strange Attractors"	May 9, 2017	106
7	"Arcadia"	May 23, 2017	107
8	"Elysian Drift"	June 5, 2017	108
9	"Hazel"	June 20, 2017	109
10	"The Future We Deserve"	July 4, 2017	110

=== Season 2 ===
(Available on Stitcher)

Episode	Title	Release date	Production code
1	"The Wrong Song"	July 13, 2021	201
2	"Play the Game, Find the Game"	July 13, 2021	202
3	"Path Cards"	July 20, 2021	203
4	"The Call of the Void"	July 27, 2021	204
5	"Like Arteries in Search of a Heart"	August 3, 2021	205
6	"The Pompitous of Love"	August 10, 2021	206
7	"Lucy and the Cardinal"	August 17, 2021	207
8	"The Mysterious Traveler"	August 24, 2021	208
9	"Atom Love Bomb"	August 31, 2021	209
10	"The Visitor Brings The Game"	September 7, 2021	210

=== The Path ===
(Available on Apple)

Episode	Title	Release date
1	"Dear Prudence"	May 25, 2021
2	"It's Not Fair"	June 1, 2021
3	"Picture in Picture"	June 8, 2021

== Reception ==
Time listed Rabbits as one of "The 50 Best Podcasts Right Now," saying it is perfect for "people nostalgic for that moment when we couldn't tell if The Blair Witch Project was real or not." USA Today chose Rabbits as their "Podcast Pick" of the week because part of its fun is that "it feels like it almost could be true." Vox chose Rabbits for a list of "podcasts to get you in the Halloween spirit" because of its "well-acted blend of urban legends, weird fiction, and your average creepypasta." Neil Patrick Harris called Rabbits "addictive."

Wil Williams criticized Rabbits for its writing, acting, and production, along with the other Pacific Northwest Stories podcasts Tanis and The Black Tapes, as well as its pacing and advertising ("How am I, the listener, supposed to feel suspense or concern in an intense plot moment when the host stops her narration to talk about Nature Box?"). Lucia Peters criticized the first episode's writing for relying too heavily on exposition.

== Novel ==
In 2021, a Rabbits novel written by Terry Miles was released. The novel tells a new story set in the same world as the podcast.
