= Terry Miles (podcaster) =

Canadian filmmaker, podcaster, and writer

- Born: Terrance Keith Miles; 1967 or 1968 (age 58–59); Moose Jaw, Saskatchewan, Canada
- Education: University of British Columbia
- Occupations: Filmmaker; podcaster; writer; musician
- Website: https://terrymiles.com/

Terry Miles is a Canadian filmmaker, podcaster, writer, and musician. He was born in Moose Jaw, Saskatchewan.

Miles is influenced by his native Vancouver and the surrounding Pacific Northwest, and his podcasts are all set in Seattle.

== Podcasts ==
Miles began his podcasting career in 2015 with The Black Tapes, a collaboration with Paul Bae. The same year he began Tanis, where he also served as the voice actor for the showrunner Nic Silver. Both shows are in a documentary style and produced by Pacific Northwest Stories, a fictional radio program. Even in interviews, Miles refers to Nic Silver as a real person and his cousin, maintaining the fictional universe. Silver went on to create the Rabbits podcast, and The Last Movie podcast, a spinoff from Tanis. Miles worked with Parcast productions on Faerie, a Spotify exclusive, in 2020. His latest podcast is Wildflowers, an Audible exclusive mini-series about the death of a high school influencer. Like his earlier works, it is set in the Pacific Northwest, but it is not presented in a documentary style.

== Other ventures ==
Miles was the lead singer/songwriter of the indie rock band Ashley Park.

== Podcasts ==
Year	Title	Director	Writer	Producer	Notes
2015	The Black Tapes	Uncredited	Yes	Yes	
2015	Tanis	Yes	Yes	Yes	
2017	Rabbits	Yes	Yes	No	
2018	The Last Movie	Yes	Yes	No	
2020	Faerie	No	Yes	Yes	
2022	Wildflowers	Yes	Yes	No	

== Filmography ==
=== Film ===
Year	Title	Director	Writer	Producer	Notes
2007	You, Me, Love	Yes	Yes	Yes	
2008	When Life Was Good	Yes	Yes	Yes	
2009	The Red Rooster	Yes	Yes	Yes	
2010	A Night for Dying Tigers	Yes	Yes	Yes	
2011	Recoil	Yes	No	No	
2012	In No Particular Order	No	No	Yes	Also Editor
2012	Dawn Rider	Yes	No	No	
2013	Cinemanovels	Yes	Yes	Yes	
2014	Lonesome Dove Church	Yes	No	No	
2015	Even Lambs Have Teeth	Yes	Yes	No	
2016	Mommy's Secret	Yes	No	No	TV Movie
2016	Stagecoach: The Texas Jack Story	Yes	No	No	
2024	Calamity Jane	Yes	No	No	

== Bibliography ==
=== Novels ===
==== Rabbits series ====
- Rabbits (2021). Del Rey. ISBN 9781984819659.
- The Quiet Room (2023). Del Rey. ISBN 9780593496404.

== Discography ==
=== Ashley Park Albums ===
- Town and Country (2000). Kindercore KC055.
- The American Scene (2001). Darling Music DM008.
- The Secretariat Motor Hotel (2003). Darling Music.

== Awards ==
Year	Body	Award	Nominated work	Result	Ref
2009	Leo Awards	Best Feature Length Drama	When Life Was Good	Nominated	
2011	Leo Awards	Best Direction: Feature Length Drama	A Night for Dying Tigers	Nominated	
2011	Leo Awards	Best Screenwriting: Feature Length Drama	A Night for Dying Tigers	Nominated	
2011	Leo Awards	Best Cinematography: Feature Length Drama	A Night for Dying Tigers	Nominated	
2011	Leo Awards	Best Picture Editing: Feature Length Drama	A Night for Dying Tigers	Nominated	
2013	Leo Awards	Best Picture Editing: Motion Picture	In No Particular Order	Nominated	
2014	Leo Awards	Best Motion Picture	Cinemanovels	Nominated	
2014	Leo Awards	Best Direction: Motion Picture	Cinemanovels	Nominated	
2014	Leo Awards	Best Screenwriting: Motion Picture	Cinemanovels	Nominated	
2021	Bram Stoker Awards	Superior Achievement in a First Novel	Rabbits	Nominated	
