= Cinemanovels =

2013 film

- Film poster
- Directed by: Terry Miles
- Written by: Terry Miles
- Produced by: Kristine Cofsky; Terry Miles; Lauren Lee Smith
- Starring: Lauren Lee Smith; Jennifer Beals; Ben Cotton; Kett Turton; Katharine Isabelle; Sarah Grey
- Cinematography: Terry Miles
- Distributed by: Monterey Media
- Release date: 6 September 2013 (TIFF)
- Running time: 89 minutes
- Country: Canada
- Language: English

Cinemanovels is a 2013 Canadian comedy film written and directed by Terry Miles. It was screened in the Contemporary World Cinema section at the 2013 Toronto International Film Festival. The film holds the record for Canada's second lowest opening weekend box office gross of 2013, earning just $298, opening to just a dozen theatres.

== Plot ==
Grace (Lauren Lee Smith) is living the spoiled inheritance lifestyle of her famous late Quebecois film director father in the swanky Gastown district of Vancouver albeit extremely bored and dissatisfied with her life. By chance, she is approached by film student Adam (Kett Turton) of her loft building who is extremely influenced by her father's cinematic works. She permits him access to remaster and release her father's cinematic archives for professor lectures, and begins a relationship with him, granting him sexual favors in gratitude for reviving her career, even though she already has her husband, Ben (Ben Cotton). Her friend Clementine (Jennifer Beals), has a secret criminally inclined double life and this eventually intertwines with Grace's double life as well.

== Cast ==
- Lauren Lee Smith as Grace
- Jennifer Beals as Clementine
- Ben Cotton as Ben
- Kett Turton as Adam
- Katharine Isabelle as Charlotte
- Sarah Grey as Julia

== Production ==
Cinemanovels was directed and written by Terry Miles, and produced by Kristine Cofsky, Terry Miles, Lauren Lee Smith. Principal photography primarily takes place in the Gastown neighbourhood in Vancouver, British Columbia.

== Reception ==
The film has a user rating of 5.3 due to mixed critic reviews on IMDb. Metacritic, which uses a weighted average, assigned the film a score of 59 out of 100, based on four critics, indicating "mixed or average" reviews.
