= Calamity Jane (2024 film) =

American western film

- Directed by: Terry Miles
- Written by: Leon Langford; Collin Watts
- Produced by: Tara Cowell-Plain
- Starring: Emily Bett Rickards; Stephen Amell; Tim Rozon; Priscilla Faia
- Cinematography: Jan Klompje
- Edited by: Trevor Mirosh
- Music by: Darren Fung
- Production company: Enlighten Content
- Distributed by: Samuel Goldwyn Films
- Release date: February 2, 2024
- Running time: 95 minutes
- Countries: Canada; United States
- Language: English

Calamity Jane is a 2024 Western film directed by Terry Miles and starring Emily Bett Rickards and Stephen Amell.

== Premise ==
A fictionalised story based around the life of Martha Jane Canary, known as Calamity Jane, as she seeks revenge following the death of Wild Bill Hickok.

== Cast ==
- Emily Bett Rickards as Calamity Jane
- Stephen Amell as Wild Bill Hickok
- Tim Rozon as Sheriff Mason
- Priscilla Faia as Abigail
- Gage Marsh as Deputy Paul
- Garrett Black as Rudd
- Christian Sloan as Baron
- Troy Mundle as Deputy Richard
- Spencer Borgeson as Floyd

== Production ==
The film was directed by Terry Miles and written by Leon Langford and Collin Watts. The film is produced by Tara Cowell-Plain and executive produced by Jack Nasser, Jacob Nasser, and Kimberley Wakefield.

The film stars Emily Bett Rickards and Stephen Amell, as well as Tim Rozon, Priscilla Faia, Gage Marsh, Garrett Black, Christian Sloan, Troy Mundle, and Spencer Borgeson.

== Release ==
The film is a Tubi Films Original but was made available on video-on-demand by Samuel Goldwyn Films on 2 February 2024.
