= Geležinis Vilkas =

Geležinis Vilkas means "iron wolf" in Lithuanian and may refer to:

- Iron Wolf (character), from the medieval foundation legend of the city of Vilnius
- FK Geležinis Vilkas
- Mechanised Infantry Brigade Iron Wolf, a unit of the Lithuanian Army
- Iron Wolf (organization), former Lithuanian fascist movement formed in 1927
