= Nerds and Monsters =

Canadian animated comedy television series

- Genre: Comedy; Science fiction Action-adventure
- Created by: Josh Mepham; Kathy Antonsen Rocchio; Greg Sullivan; Vito Viscomi
- Directed by: Josh Mepham; Greg Sullivan
- Voices of: Michael Adamthwaite; Ian James Corlett; Michael Daingerfield; Brian Dobson; Brian Drummond; Ty Olsson; Tabitha St. Germain; Lee Tockar; Vincent Tong
- Theme music composer: Steve D'Angelo; Terry Tompkins
- Opening theme: "Nerds and Monsters"
- Ending theme: "Nerds and Monsters" (instrumental)
- Composer: Hal Beckett
- Country of origin: Canada
- Original language: English
- No. of seasons: 2
- No. of episodes: 40 (80 segments)

Production
- Executive producers: Kathy Antonsen Rocchio; Josh Mepham; Greg Sullivan; Vito Viscomi; Vince Commisso
- Producer: Kathy Antonsen Rocchio
- Running time: 22 minutes
- Production companies: Slap Happy Cartoons Inc. 9 Story Media Group

Original release
- Network: YTV
- Release: March 12, 2014 – August 27, 2016

Nerds and Monsters is a Canadian animated comedy television series that aired on YTV in Canada. The series was created by Josh Mepham, Kathy Antonsen Rocchio, Greg Sullivan, and Vito Viscomi and produced by Slap Happy Cartoons Inc. and 9 Story Media Group. Its punk-sounding theme song was composed by Steve D'Angelo and Terry Tompkins. It was announced at the 2014 Banff World Media Festival that the series was renewed for a second season. On July 14, 2015, the series was picked up by Hulu to stream it as part of Hulu Kids. The series ended on August 27, 2016. 40 episodes were produced.

== Premise ==
The series follows three nerdy kids and a simple football linebacker on a fantastic uncharted island with monsters.

== Characters ==
=== Humans ===
- Dudley Squat (voiced by Tabitha St. Germain) is the self-proclaimed leader of the nerds, despite his short stature. He apparently has a Napoleon complex, as he is often demanding things be done a certain way – HIS way, but just not to be too bossy though. Dudley is also willing to undo his wrongdoings whenever his frequent selfish desires put Irwin, Becky, and Stan in trouble. He is Jewish Canadian.
- Irwin Chang-Stein (voiced by Vincent Tong) is a nerd who is often cowardly and accident-prone, as he has a phobia of everything, except some things, including Becky, who he has a crush on. He is of mixed Chinese Canadian and Jewish Canadian descent.
- Rebecca "Becky" Hooger (voiced by Tabitha St. Germain) is a tall, excitable Scottish Canadian nerd, who is the only female in the group. She has a particular fondness for zoology and entomology, as she enjoys keeping journals about various creatures inhabiting the island. She is the love interest of both Irwin and Stan.
- Stanley "Stan" Grissle (voiced by Ty Olsson) is a fun-loving and goofy Canadian-American jock, who serves the top lineman on the Beaverton Middle School Bulldogs football team. He is nowhere near as smart as his nerdy friends are, yet he is very friendly and sweet towards everyone he meets. Stan also has an obvious crush on Becky, and she appears to reciprocate his feelings. The only reason he's with Dudley, Irwin and Becky is because according to the theme song, he thinks he got on the wrong bus.

=== Monsters ===
- Zarg (voiced by Brian Dobson) is king of the monsters, and Lyle's uncle. His position as Supreme Leader is threatened by the nerds' arrival.
- Skur (voiced by Ian James Corlett) is a winged lizard-like monster, King Zarg's servant, who is fed up being second banana, so is bent on dethroning Zarg and becoming king of Monster Island.
- Lyle (voiced by Brian Drummond) is a nerdy monster, King Zarg's nephew, who is forced to live life like the other monsters. This is proved in one episode where he doesn't want to "monster up".
- Urp and Durn (voiced by Lee Tockar and Michael Adamthwaite) are Lyle's parents that share the same body. Durn is the sister of King Zarg.
- Vink (voiced by Michael Daingerfield) is a giant, childlike monster with a short attention span.
- Maiden Cheena is Queen of Monster Island, a children's inflatable pool toy that was washed up onto the island some time ago. Her name comes from the Made in China label imprinted on her rubber back.

== Episodes ==
=== Season 1 (2014) ===
1. Dear Diary / Monster and Commander (March 12, 2014)
2. Sub Sandwich / Dorkathalon (March 19, 2014)
3. Honk if You're in Love / Fright of Passage (March 26, 2014)
4. The Marriage Ref / Ka-Boom with a View (April 2, 2014)
5. Are You Gonna Eat That? / Monster BFF (April 9, 2014)
6. For the Love of Dung / The Voice of Treason (April 16, 2014)
7. What's Mine is Mine / The Wind Beneath My Wings (April 23, 2014)
8. Maiden Cheena Lays an Eggie / Hero Zeros (April 30, 2014)
9. Guys and Dolls / Heat Wave (May 7, 2014)
10. Oh Brother / The Comic or the Girl (May 14, 2014)
11. Eye! Eye! Eye! / Stan by Me (May 21, 2014)
12. Dudley the Manservant / Cure for the Common Nerd (May 28, 2014)
13. Fab Rick / Inside the Box (June 4, 2014)
14. Monstervision / The Squider Whisperer (June 11, 2014)
15. The Host with the Moats / Monsterball (June 18, 2014)
16. Flower Power / Maiden Cheena is Missing (June 25, 2014)
17. Franken-Nerd / Monstergeist (July 9, 2014)
18. Monster Movie / Springing Lyle (July 23, 2014)
19. Pet Peeved / No Pranks to You (August 13, 2014)
20. Molting Day / Zanti-Clops (August 27, 2014)

=== Season 2 (2016) ===
1. Miss Monster Island / Lucky Day (January 8, 2016)
2. Where's the Beep? / Evolution (January 15, 2016)
3. It's Not Good to Be King / Monster Island: The Game (January 22, 2016)
4. Nerd Fu / Dudley's Kitchen Nightmare (January 29, 2016)
5. Nerd High / Me Stan, You Linty (February 6, 2016)
6. The Sky's the Limit / Clown of Darkness (February 13, 2016)
7. Tickle Stick / Monstarrrghs! (February 20, 2016)
8. Run Nerd Run / Adventures in Monstersitting (February 27, 2016)
9. The Falconerd / The Head of Destiny (March 5, 2016)
10. Nerds and Monster Bus / Zarg's Ducky Day (March 12, 2016)
11. Nerdzilla / Monster Fever (March 19, 2016)
12. The Big Stanuna / Power to the Pimple (March 26, 2016)
13. Zarg World / The Nerdscapes (April 2, 2016)
14. Bee-Hive Yourself / Bucktooth Rogers (April 9, 2016)
15. Cannibal Run / Little Bundle of Terror (June 25, 2016)
16. Survival of the Twittest / Nerdes and the Moonsters (July 9, 2016)
17. Irwiener / Brother Brother (July 16, 2016)
18. Chatty Cheena / That's Snot Art (July 23, 2016)
19. Einstan / The Nerdhood of the Traveling Pants (July 30, 2016)
20. Behind the Scrotch / Night of the Living Nerds (August 27, 2016)

== Early prototype ==
The first prototype of the series had four nerds; Becky Hoogerstein, Dudley Squat, Winston Chang and Fareed Singh. They were completely different in appearance; Becky was a curly haired brunette, Dudley had bigger glasses and blond hair and Winston had shorter hair and was described as Spock-like. Fareed was written out of the final version and replaced with Stan. Becky's name was shortened and Winston became Irwin with the "stein" from Becky's original name being inserted into his. Dudley's name was kept, but he too was altered.

Zarg was originally called Zar and designed with orange fur, and Skur had no fur at all. Urp and Durn's only change was the addition of fingers instead of tentacle-like hands.

== Broadcast ==
The series also airs on CITV and ITV in the United Kingdom, UTV in Northern Ireland, Canal+ Family and Télétoon+ in France, Disney XD in Poland, Gloob in Brazil, and ABC3 in Australia.

== Awards and nominations ==
Year	Association	Award Category	Notes	Result
2014	Leo Awards	Best Screenwriting in an Animation Program or Series	Greg Sullivan	Won
2014	Leo Awards	Best Screenwriting in an Animation Program or Series	Kendra Hibbert	Nominated
2014	Leo Awards	Best Direction in an Animation Program or Series	Greg Sullivan and Denis Crawford	Nominated
2014	Leo Awards	Best Performance in an Animation Program or Series	Tabitha St. Germain	Nominated
2014	Leo Awards	Best Performance in an Animation Program or Series	Vincent Tong	Nominated
2015	Canadian Screen Awards	Best Writing in an Animated Program or Series	Vito Viscomi	Nominated
2015	WGC Screenwriting Awards	Best Writing in an Animated Program or Series	Greg Sullivan	Nominated
2015	Leo Awards	Best Direction in an Animation Program or Series	Greg Sullivan and Russell Crispin	Nominated
2015	Leo Awards	Best Performance in an Animation Program or Series	Ian James Corlett	Nominated
2015	Leo Awards	Best Screenwriting in an Animation Program or Series	Dennis Heaton	Won
2015	Pixie Awards	Animation	Slap Happy Cartoons	Won
2016	Leo Awards	Best Direction in an Animation Program or Series	Greg Sullivan and Denis Crawford	Nominated
2016	Leo Awards	Best Direction in an Animation Program or Series	Josh Mepham and Jason Horychun	Won
2016	Leo Awards	Best Animation Program or Series	Josh Mepham, Greg Sullivan, Kathy Antonsen Rocchio and Vito Viscomi	Won
2016	Leo Awards	Best Screenwriting in an Animation Program or Series	Greg Sullivan	Won
2017	Canadian Screen Awards	Best Writing in an Animated Program or Series	Craig Martin	Won
