= The Black Tapes =

Horror podcast

- Genre: Investigative journalism; Serialized audio narrative; Horror podcast; pseudo-documentary
- Language: English

Cast and voices
- Hosted by: Alex Reagan

Technical specifications
- Audio format: Podcast (via streaming or downloadable MP3)

Publication
- No. of seasons: 3
- No. of episodes: 30
- Original release: May 21, 2015 – November 7, 2017
- Provider: Pacific Northwest Stories
- Updates: Thursday morning; Season 1: Episode 1–6: weekly; Episode 7–12: bi-weekly; Season 2–3: bi-weekly

Related
- Website: The Black Tapes Podcast

The Black Tapes is a mystery-horror pseudo-documentary podcast created by Paul Bae and Terry Miles. Published by Pacific Northwest Stories, it is part of their series of podcasts set in the same fictional universe (such as Tanis and Rabbits) which, despite being works of fiction, are presented as legitimate true stories both within the podcast and outside of it; the podcast has no credited writers or performers, as the events and characters are framed as real.

In-universe, The Black Tapes is hosted by Alex Reagan (voiced by Lori Henry) and produced by Nic Silver (voiced by Miles). Reagan narrates a serialized story exploring the life and work of paranormal investigator Dr. Richard Strand (voiced by Christian Sloan), an "evangelical skeptic" on a mission to debunk all claims of the supernatural, and his collection of unsolved cases, the eponymous "Black Tapes".

The show started on May 21, 2015 and concluded with the sixth episode of its third season on November 7, 2017; the next year, the creators would announce an upcoming fourth season, and in 2020 the final episode was re-released with a description labelling it a "mid-season finale"; however, no follow-up was released, and Pacific Northwest Stories has not published new audio material since 2021.

== Production ==
Episodes vary in length, from thirty-five to fifty minutes. New episodes were originally available weekly, but partway through the first season the schedule was revised to every other week.

The original run of The Black Tapes was from May 21 2015 to September 7 2017. The show ended with a six episode wrap-up and the creators stated that was the end. Then on March 20 2018 it was announced on the official Twitter account for The Black Tapes that the show would return for another season.

On January 13 2020 season 3 of The Black Tapes was re-released with no changes to the audio. However, the episode description of the final episode "Into the Black" was changed to denote that it is the "Season Three Mid-Season finale".

The show uses investigative journalism as a framing device, having Alex Reagan document her investigations into the paranormal and the work of Richard Strand; the template is used by other by other Pacific Northwest Stories podcasts such as Rabbits and Tanis.

== Episodes ==
=== Season 1 (2015) ===
No.	Title	Original release date	Prod. code
1	"A Tale of Two Tapes Part I"	May 25, 2015	101
While hosting the pilot of a podcast focusing on interviewing people with interesting jobs, Alex Reagan is roped into a paranormal investigation of an abandoned and allegedly haunted credit union. Over the course of the investigation, she contacts well-known paranormal investigator and skeptic Dr. Richard Strand to analyze the haunting. He uncovers evidence apparently proving that the haunting is a hoax, but Alex chooses to shift the focus of the podcast to a documentary on Strand after being intrigued by his collection of unsolved cases, a series of black VHS tapes nicknamed "the Black Tapes".
2	"A Tale of Two Tapes Part II"	May 26, 2015	102
Alex and Strand travel to San Francisco to follow up on one of the Black Tapes, which centers around the apparent haunting of the Torres family by a malevolent, shadow-like spirit.
3	"The Unsound"	June 2, 2015	103
After the suicide of the lead singer of popular Seattle underground rock band Hastur Rising, Alex and Strand are contacted by the band's guitarist, who claims that his suicide was caused by a recording of the Unsound, a mysterious piece of audio alleged to have been created by the Devil himself.
4	"Turn that Frown Upside Down"	June 9, 2015	104
After receiving a video tape of a young woman apparently being frightened to death by an unseen figure, Alex and Strand are drawn to the small town of Charlesworth, Maine, and its local legend: the Woman with the Upside Down Face.
5	"The Devil You Know"	June 16, 2015	105
6	"The Devil's Door"	June 23, 2015	106
7	"Cabin Fever"	August 4, 2015	107
8	"Board to Death"	August 18, 2015	108
9	"Name that Tune"	September 9, 2015	109
10	"Their Satanic Monastery’s Request"	September 15, 2015	110
11	"The Codex Gigas"	September 29, 2015	111
12	"Shadow Dancing"	October 13, 2015	112

=== Season 2 (2016) ===
No. overall	No. in series	Title	Original release date	Prod. code
13	1	"Sleepless in Seattle"	January 19, 2016	201
14	2	"Speak No Evil, Think No Evil"	February 2, 2016	202
15	3	"Hush Little Baby"	February 16, 2016	203
16	4	"Voices Carry"	March 1, 2016	204
17	5	"Cheryl"	May 10, 2016	205
18	6	"All in the Family"	May 24, 2016	206
19	7	"Personal Possessions"	June 7, 2016	207
20	8	"Riverview"	June 21, 2016	208
21	9	"The Brothers of the Mount"	July 5, 2016	209
22	10	"Welcome to the Machine"	July 19, 2016	210
23	11	"About a Boy"	August 2, 2016	211
24	12	"The Axis Mundi"	August 16, 2016	212

=== Season 3 (2017) ===
No. overall	No. in series	Title	Original release date	Prod. code
25	1	"The Sins of the Father"	August 29, 2017	301
26	2	"The Musica Mundana"	September 12, 2017	302
27	3	"A Family Gathering"	September 26, 2017	303
28	4	"Songs and Signs"	October 10, 2017	304
29	5	"Worlds Collide"	October 24, 2017	305
30	6	"Into the Black"	November 7, 2017	306

== Music ==
'Ghostpocalypse - 6 Crossing the Threshold' is one of several tracks by Kevin MacLeod used in The Black Tapes.

'The Kingdom of the Universe', which is played near the start of each episode, was written by Ashley Park. Terry Miles wrote the podcast's theme. The series uses free royalty-free music by Kevin MacLeod.

== Reception ==
The podcast has received generally favorable reviews for its writing, production, and intricacy. Melissa Locker in The Guardian described the podcast as taking place in "a world where math, musical theory, obscure points of history, and science become either clues of a possible demonic invasion – or just random events linked only by an active imagination."

== Television adaptation ==
In October 2026, MGM+ gave a series order to an eight-episode series based on The Black Tapes with creators Bae and Miles set to write, and Nikolaj Coster-Waldau starring in the lead role.

== See also ==
- Tanis, a sister show to The Black Tapes in which Alex Reagan sometimes appeared
- Horror podcast
