= You Can Let Go =

Single by Crystal Shawanda

from the album Dawn of a New Day
- Released: January 7, 2008 (CAN); February 25, 2008 (US)
- Genre: Country
- Length: 3:34
- Label: RCA Nashville
- Songwriters: Cory Batten; Kent Blazy; Rory Feek
- Producer: Scott Hendricks

Crystal Shawanda singles chronology
"You Can Let Go" (2008)	"What Do I Have to Do" (2008)

Crystal Shawanda American singles chronology
"You Can Let Go" (2008)	"My Roots Are Showing" (2008)

"You Can Let Go" is a song written by Rory Feek, Kent Blazy and Cory Batten, and recorded by Canadian country music artist Crystal Shawanda. It was released in Canada in January 2008 and the U.S. in February 2008 as the first single from the album Dawn of a New Day. The song became the fastest rising debut Canadian country single ever. "You Can Let Go" was nominated for Single of the Year at the 2008 Canadian Country Music Association Awards.

In the United States, "You Can Let Go" peaked at number 21 on the Hot Country Songs charts.

== Content ==
The song features three scenarios where the female narrator asks her father to "let go" of her, the first being when she is riding a bicycle as a child.

== Critical reception ==
Kevin John Coyne of Country Universe rated the song "A", praising Shawanda's voice and saying that "I knew where 'You Can Let Go' was going to end up by the third verse, but I was still choked up by it, as the songwriters painted an achingly accurate portrait."

== Music video ==
A music video was released for the song, directed by Margaret Malandruccolo. In the video, Shawanda is shown singing the song on the stage of an empty auditorium along with scenes of her as a child (played by Cassandra Laus) riding a bicycle.

== Chart performance ==
Chart (2008)	Peak position
Canada Country (Billboard)	5
Canada Hot 100 (Billboard)	60
US Hot Country Songs (Billboard)	21
US Billboard Bubbling Under Hot 100	9

Year-end chart performance
Chart (2008)	Position
Canada Country (Billboard)	13
