= Dennis Heaton =

Canadian screenwriter

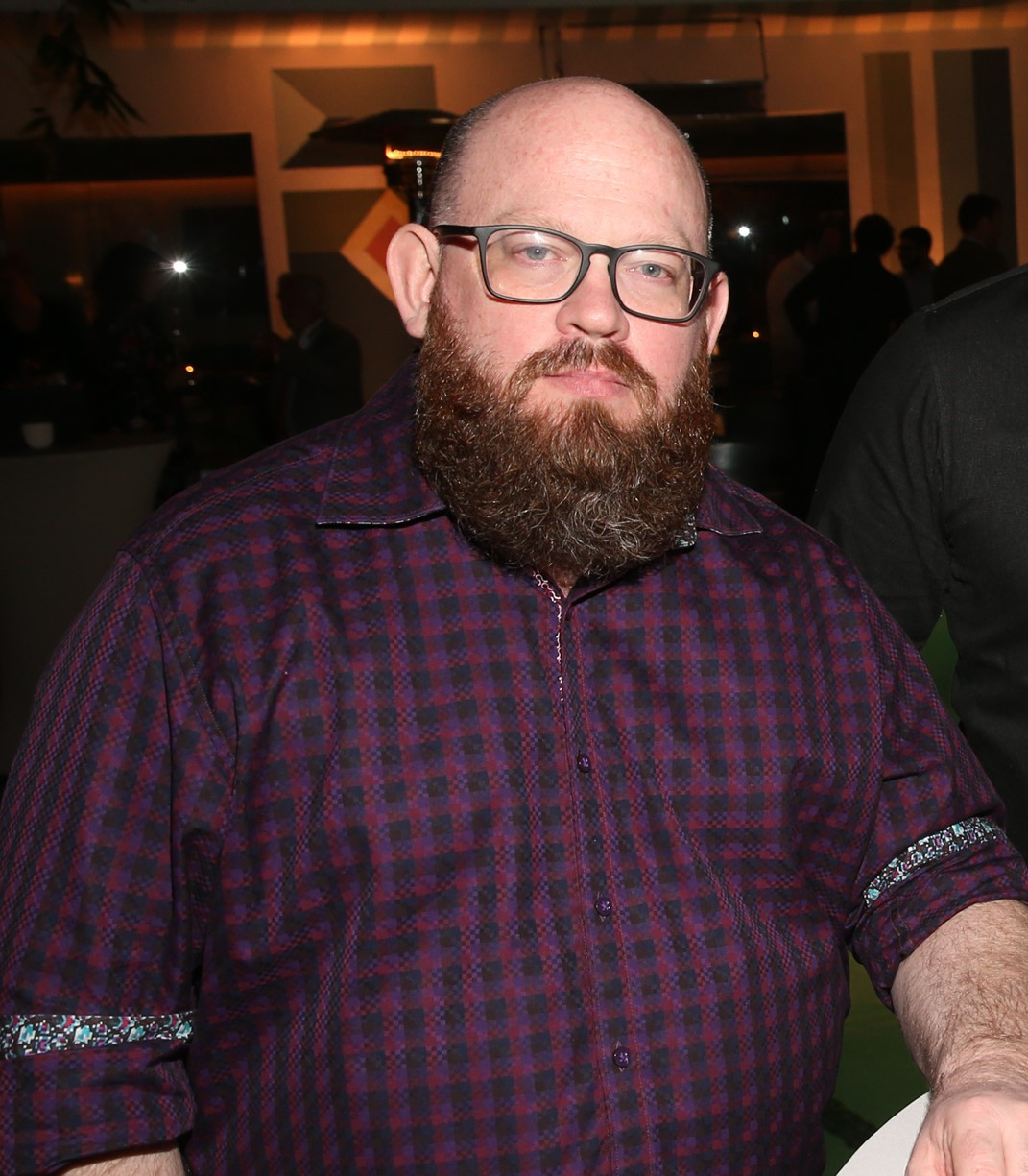
- Heaton, in 2017
- Occupation: Screenwriter
- Years active: 1994–present

Dennis Heaton is a Canadian screenwriter working in film and television. He formerly executive produced and show-ran The Order for Netflix. Other recent credits include executive producing and writing on Ghost Wars for SYFY and Netflix, executive producing and showrunning Motive on CTV/NBCU, Call Me Fitz (HBO Canada/Audience Network), The Listener (CTV/NBC), JPOD (CBC), Blood Ties (Lifetime/Space) and the feature film Fido.

Heaton received two 2014 Canadian Screen Awards Nominations for Best Dramatic Series for Motive and Best Comedy Series for Call Me Fitz, with Fitz winning the category. He has four prior Gemini Award nominations, four Canadian Screenwriting Award nominations, winning for his Yvon of the Yukon script "The Trouble With Mammoths", and eleven Leo Award nominations, winning for his Being Ian script "The Greatest Story Never Told" and his Call Me Fitz script "Fucking Memories". His web series, My Pal Satan, won Best Web Series and Theme Song at the New York Television Festival. His short film Head Shot premiered in competition at the Berlin International Film Festival, won best short film at the Just For Laughs Festival in Montreal, and went on to play in film festivals and on television around the world.

He won two Leo Awards in 2015 - one for Best Dramatic Series for Motive and one for Best Screenwriting/ Animation Program or Series for Nerds and Monsters - "Are You Gonna Eat That?"

Dennis Heaton has served as the Pacific Region Councilor for the Writers Guild of Canada since 2012. In 2018, he was elected president of the WGC.

== Filmography ==
=== Film ===
Title	Year	Credited as			Notes
Title	Year	Director	Producer	Writer	Notes
Let's Chop Soo-E	1989	No	No	No	Short film; production supervisor
Angel Square	1990	No	No	No	animation production manager
Pink Komkommer	1991	No	No	No	Short film; production supervisor
Deadly Deposits	1993	No	Yes	No	Short film
Headshot	2006	Yes	No	Yes	Short film
Fido	2006	No	No	Yes	
Funny Business	2011	No	No	No	Short film; story editor

=== Television ===
The numbers in directing and writing credits refer to the number of episodes.

Title	Year	Credited as				Network	Notes
Title	Year	Creator	Director	Writer	Executive Producer	Network	Notes
The Brothers Grunt	1994–1995	Developer	No	Yes (8)	No	MTV	Also producer
Gary Larson's Tales from the Far Side	1994	No	No	No	No	CBS	Television film; producer
Life and Times	1997, 2002		No	Yes (1)	No	CBC Television	Documentary; additional producer (1 episode, 1997), writer (2002)
Gary Larson's Tales From the Far Side II	1997	No	No	No	No	BBC	Television film; producer
Murder in Normandy	1999		No	Yes	No	History Television	Documentary
Forced March to Freedom	2001		Yes	Yes	No	History Television	Documentary
KinK	2001–2002	No	Yes (26)	No	No	Showcase	director (seasons 1–2), creative consultant (season 2)
ZeD	2002	No	No	Yes (1)	No	CBC Television	segment "Cannibalism and Your Teen"
Yvon of the Yukon	2002, 2004	No	No	Yes (2)	No	YTV	
Atomic Betty	2004	No	No	Yes	No	Teletoon	unknown episodes
Being Ian	2005, 2008	No	No	Yes (4)	No	YTV	
Life with Derek	2005	No	No	Yes (1)	No	Family	
Blood Ties	2007	No	No	Yes (5)	No	Lifetime	Also story editor
Wayside	2007	No	No	Yes (1)	No	Teletoon	
George of the Jungle	2007	No	No	Yes (2)	No	Teletoon	
Jibber Jabber	2007	No	No	Yes (1)	No	YTV	
jPod	2008	No	No	Yes (3)	No	CBC Television	co-producer (4 episodes)
The Listener	2009	No	No	Yes (2)	No	CTV	Co-producer (season 1)
Casper's Scare School	2009	No	No	Yes	No	YTV	unknown episodes
My Pal Satan	2009	Yes	No	Yes (6)	No		web series
Keep Your Head Up, Kid: The Don Cherry Story	2010	No	No	No	No	CBC	miniseries; co-producer
Call Me Fitz	2010–2012	No	No	Yes (12)	No	HBO Canada	co-producer (season 1), co-executive producer (seasons 2–3)
Rated A for Awesome	2011	No	No	Yes (1)	No	YTV	
Motive	2013–2016	No	No	Yes (13)	Yes	CTV	
Motive Digital Series: The Dark Corner	2013	No	No	No	Yes		web series
Primeval: New World	2013	No	No	Yes (1)	No	Space	
Nerds and Monsters	2014	No	No	Yes (3)	No	YTV	
Olympus	2014	No	No	Yes (1)	No	Super Channel	
Ghost Wars	2017–2018	No	No	Yes (2)	Yes	Syfy	
The Order	2019–2020	Yes	No	Yes (5)	Yes	Netflix	
The Imperfects	2022	Yes	Yes	Yes	Yes	Netflix	
Murder in a Small Town	2024–2025	No	No	Yes (2)	No	Global/Fox	

== Awards and nominations ==
Awards

- 2015 Leo - Best Dramatic Series for Motive
- 2015 Leo - Best Screenwriting for an Animation Program or Series for Nerds and Monsters - Episode "Are You Gonna Eat That?"
- 2012 Leo - Best Screenwriting in a Music, Comedy, or Variety Program or Series - Call Me Fitz: "Fucking Memories"
- 2009 Best Web Series and Theme Song, New York Television Festival for My Pal Satan
- 2005 Leo - Best Animation Program or Series - Being Ian
- 2003 Writers Guild of Canada - Top 10 - Yvon of the Yukon

Nominations

- 2015 Leo - Best Dramatic Series for Motive
- 2014 Leo - Best Dramatic Series for Motive
- 2012 Leo - Best Screenwriting in a Music, Comedy, or Variety Program or Series - Call Me Fitz: "Dysfunctional Family Circus"
- 2010 Leo - Best Web Series - My Pal Satan
- 2009 Writers Guild of Canada - Best Short Subject or Web Series - My Pal Satan
- 2008 Leo - Best Screenwriting in an Animation Program or Series - George of the Jungle
- 2008 Leo - Best Screenwriting in a Dramatic Series - jPod: "Betty & Veronica Syndrome"
- 2007 Leo - Best Screenwriting in a Feature Length Drama - Fido
- 2007 Leo - Best Screenwriting in a Short Drama - Head Shot
- 2007 Leo - Best Short Drama - Head Shot
- 2007 Writers Guild of Canada Award - Feature Film Fido
- 2006 Berlin Film Festival Best Short Film - Head Shot
- 2005 Leo - Best Animation Program or Series - Being Ian
- 2004 Writers Guild of Canada Award - Best Writing in Children's & Preschool - Yvon of the Yukon episode "Siamese Twits"
- 2002 Leo - Best Screenwriting Youth Or Children's Program Or Series - Yvon of the Yukon - "An ‘F’ In Friendship"
