= Dawn Rider =

2012 film

- Film poster
- Directed by: Terry Miles
- Written by: Joseph Nasser
- Produced by: Paul Malvern
- Starring: Christian Slater; Jill Hennessy; Donald Sutherland
- Cinematography: Norm Li
- Edited by: Trevor Mirosh
- Production company: NGN Productions
- Distributed by: NGN Releasing
- Release date: May 29, 2012
- Running time: 94 minutes
- Country: United States
- Language: English

Dawn Rider is a 2012 Canadian-American Western film starring Christian Slater, Jill Hennessy and Donald Sutherland. It is a remake of the 1935 John Wayne film The Dawn Rider.

== Plot ==
Cincinnati John Mason, who says he has never been to Cincinnati, visits his father in Promise, Wyoming in 1883. His father is not happy to see him, but they do get to spend some time together before the father is killed by a masked gang robbing the mail. Mason's friend Rudd needs $5000 to save his ranch and he doesn't care how he gets it, even putting the ranch before his sister Alice. Mason wants to find this gang because they killed his father, while a bounty hunter named Cochrane is after Mason. One way to attract the gang, and to possibly save Rudd's ranch, is the payroll for railway workers which is being delivered to Promise and must be taken from there to the railroad.

== Cast ==
- Christian Slater as John
- Jill Hennessy as Alice
- Donald Sutherland as Cochrane
- George Canyon as Cattle Jack
- Lochlyn Munro as Rudd
- Ben Cotton as Ben
- Adrian Hough as Sheriff Cobb
- Ken Yanko as Dad Mason

== Awards ==
The costume design in the film earned Zohra Shahalimi the Leo Award for Best Costume Design for Feature Length Drama.
