= Sarah Grey =

Canadian actress (born 1996)

- Born: May 19, 1996 (age 30); British Columbia, Canada
- Occupation: Actress
- Years active: 2013–present

Sarah Grey (born May 19, 1996) is a Canadian actress. She may be best known for her portrayal of Alyssa, the female lead on the two season run (2019–2020) of the Netflix horror-drama series The Order.

== Life and career ==
Grey was born in British Columbia, Canada.

Grey has appeared on shows such as Almost Human, and Bates Motel playing young Norma Bates. Her first film role came in 2013, when she landed the part of Jennifer Beals' daughter Julia in the film Cinemanovels, which was a 2013 Official Selection for the Toronto International Film Festival. Grey has appeared in several television films, the first of which was The Wrong Girl, in 2015. In August 2016, Grey was announced as portraying Courtney Whitmore/Stargirl in the second season of The CW television series Legends of Tomorrow. In April 2018, Grey was cast in the Netflix horror-drama series The Order, playing the female lead Alyssa Drake.

== Filmography ==
=== Film ===
Year	Title	Role	Notes
2013	Cinemanovels	Julia	
2013	Embrace of the Vampire	Young Charlotte	Direct-to-video film
2017	Power Rangers	Amanda Clark	
2017	Last Night in Suburbia	Hailey	
2022	Hello, Goodbye, and Everything in Between	Collette	
2025	Violence	Charlotte	
TBA	What the F*ck Is My Password	TBA	Filming

=== Television ===
Year	Title	Role	Notes
2013	Almost Human	Lila	Episode: "Perception"
2014	Bates Motel	Young Norma Bates	Episode: "Check-Out"
2015	The Wrong Girl	Sophia Allen	TV movie, a.k.a. Fatal Friends
2015	Liar, Liar, Vampire	Not Caitlyn	TV movie
2015	A Mother's Instinct	Scarlett Betnner	TV movie, a.k.a. Her Own Justice
2016	iZombie	Frankie	Episode: "Reflections of the Way Liv Used to Be"
2016	Lucifer	Rose	Episode: "#TeamLucifer"
2016	The Wedding March	Julie Turner	TV movie
2016	Motive	Nancy Bailin	Episode: "The Dead Hand"
2016	Wayward Pines	Abigail	Episode: "Walcott Prep"
2016–17	Legends of Tomorrow	Courtney Whitmore / Stargirl	3 episodes (season 2)
2016	Mommy's Secret	Denise Harding	TV movie
2017	Wedding March 2: Resorting to Love	Julie Turner	TV movie
2017	Story of a Girl	Caitlin Spinelli	TV movie
2018	Wedding March: Here Comes the Bride	Julie Turner	TV movie
2018	Lethal Soccer Mom	Cameron	TV movie, a.k.a. Sidelined
2018	When Calls the Heart	Rhonda	Episode: "Weather the Storm"
2018	Once Upon a Time	Sleeping Princess	Episode: "Homecoming"
2018	Hailey Dean Mystery: A Marriage Made for Murder	Nicole	TV movie
2018	No One Would Tell	Jacqueline	TV movie
2019–2020	The Order	Alyssa Drake	Main role
2021	The Secret Lives of College Freshmen	Hannah Marks	TV movie
