= Poppy Liu =

American actress (born 1992)

- 柳波
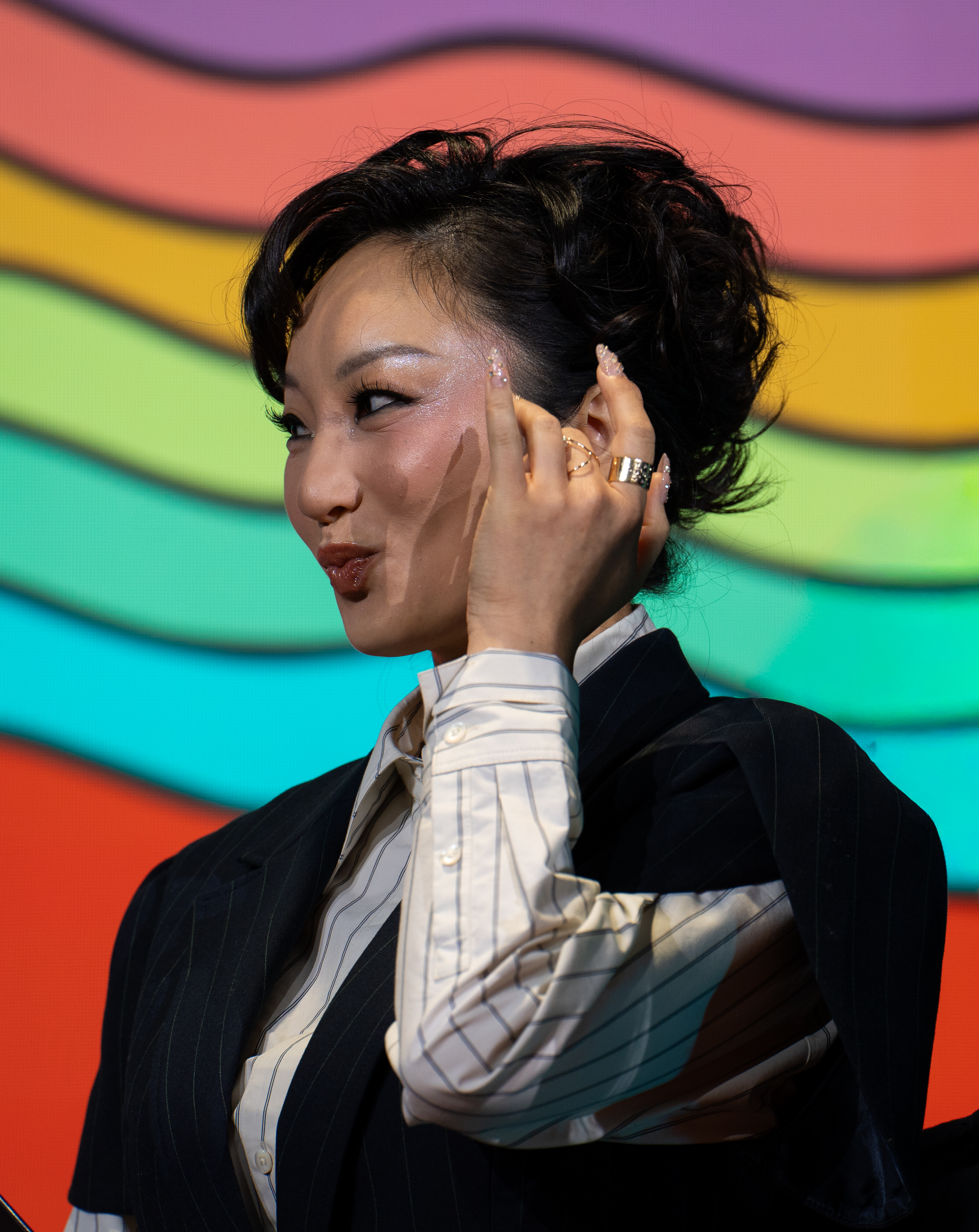
- Liu at SXSW 2026
- Born: Xi'an, China
- Education: Colgate University (BA)
- Occupation: Actress
- Years active: 2018–present
- Known for: Hacks
- Website: poppyliu.com

Poppy Liu (Chinese: 柳波; pinyin: Liǔ Bō) is a Chinese-born American actress known for her (Note: Liu uses she/her and they/them pronouns. This article uses she/her for consistency.) roles in Sunnyside, Hacks, iCarly, and Dead Ringers.

== Early life and education ==
Liu was born in Xi'an, China. Her family moved to Minnesota when she was two while her father earned a second PhD. The family moved back to China when Liu was 14, where she attended an international school in Shanghai. During high school, she became interested in performing, and participated in Chinese dance, ballet, and theater.

Liu attended Colgate University in Hamilton, New York, and majored in women's studies and theater. She graduated in 2013.

== Career ==
After graduation, Liu founded the production company Collective Sex, with a focus eliminating stigma around sex and identity. In 2018, she premiered her short film Names of Women in New York City; it also toured across the country at college campuses and reproductive health organizations. The film was made with an all-female crew and is based on Liu's abortion story.

In 2019, Liu had a starring role in the sitcom Sunnyside. Liu has also had roles on New Amsterdam, Law & Order: Special Victims Unit, and Better Call Saul. She has a recurring role as a blackjack dealer in the 2021 HBO Max sitcom Hacks, and a recurring role as Double Dutch on the 2021 Paramount+ sitcom iCarly.

Liu starred as Greta Leung, assistant to the main characters the Mantle twins, in the 2023 Amazon Prime Video miniseries Dead Ringers. The series won a Peabody Award.

== Personal life ==
Liu is a doula and offers free services to women of color and transgender people. Liu is queer and non-binary, and uses she/her and they/them pronouns. She had an abortion in 2015, which inspired a short film she created. Liu gave birth to her first child in December 2022.

Liu converted to Islam in August 2024.

== Filmography ==
=== Film ===
Year	Title	Role	Notes
2018	Summon	Mannequin	Short
2019	Separation Celebration	Aldus	Short
2019	Safe Among Stars	Jia	Short
2020	Flourish	Lazer	Short
2020	To Do	Steph	Short
2020	Certified Black Genius	Maisa	Short
2024	The Tiger's Apprentice	Snake (voice)	
2024	Space Cadet	Nadine Cai	
2025	Dog Man	Butler (voice)	
2026	I Love Boosters	Jianhu	
TBA	What the F*ck Is My Password?	TBA	Post-production

=== Television ===
Year	Title	Role	Notes
2018	New Amsterdam	Amy Chiang	Episode: "Three Dots"
2018–2019	Mercy Mistress	Mistress Yin	Main cast
2019	Law & Order: Special Victims Unit	Hannah Berkowitz	Episode: "Dearly Beloved"
2019	Sunnyside	Mei Lin	Main cast
2020–2022	Better Call Saul	Jo	Recurring cast: Season 5, Guest: Season 6
2021–2022	iCarly	Double Dutch	Recurring cast: Season 1, Guest: Season 2
2021–2026	Hacks	Kiki	Recurring cast: Season 1–2, Guest: Season 3–5
2022	Dollface	Lotus Dragon Bebe	Episode: "Boss Lady"
2022	Tales of the Walking Dead	Amy	Episode: "Amy/Dr. Everett"
2022	Wedding Season	Mitzi Yeung	Episodes: 6,7,8
2023	History of the World, Part II	Ehri Khan	Episode: "VII"
2023	Dead Ringers	Greta Leung	Main cast
2023	American Born Chinese	Princess Iron Fan	Recurring cast
2023	The Afterparty	Grace Zhu	Main cast: Season 2
2024	No Good Deed	Sarah	Main cast
2026	His & Hers	Helen Wang	Recurring cast
2026	Dang!	Eunice Dang	Voice; Main cast

== Awards and nominations ==
Year	Award	Category	Work	Result	Ref.
2021	Screen Actors Guild Award	Outstanding Performance by an Ensemble in a Comedy Series	Hacks	Nominated	
