= Crystal Shawanda =

Canadian musician (born 1983)

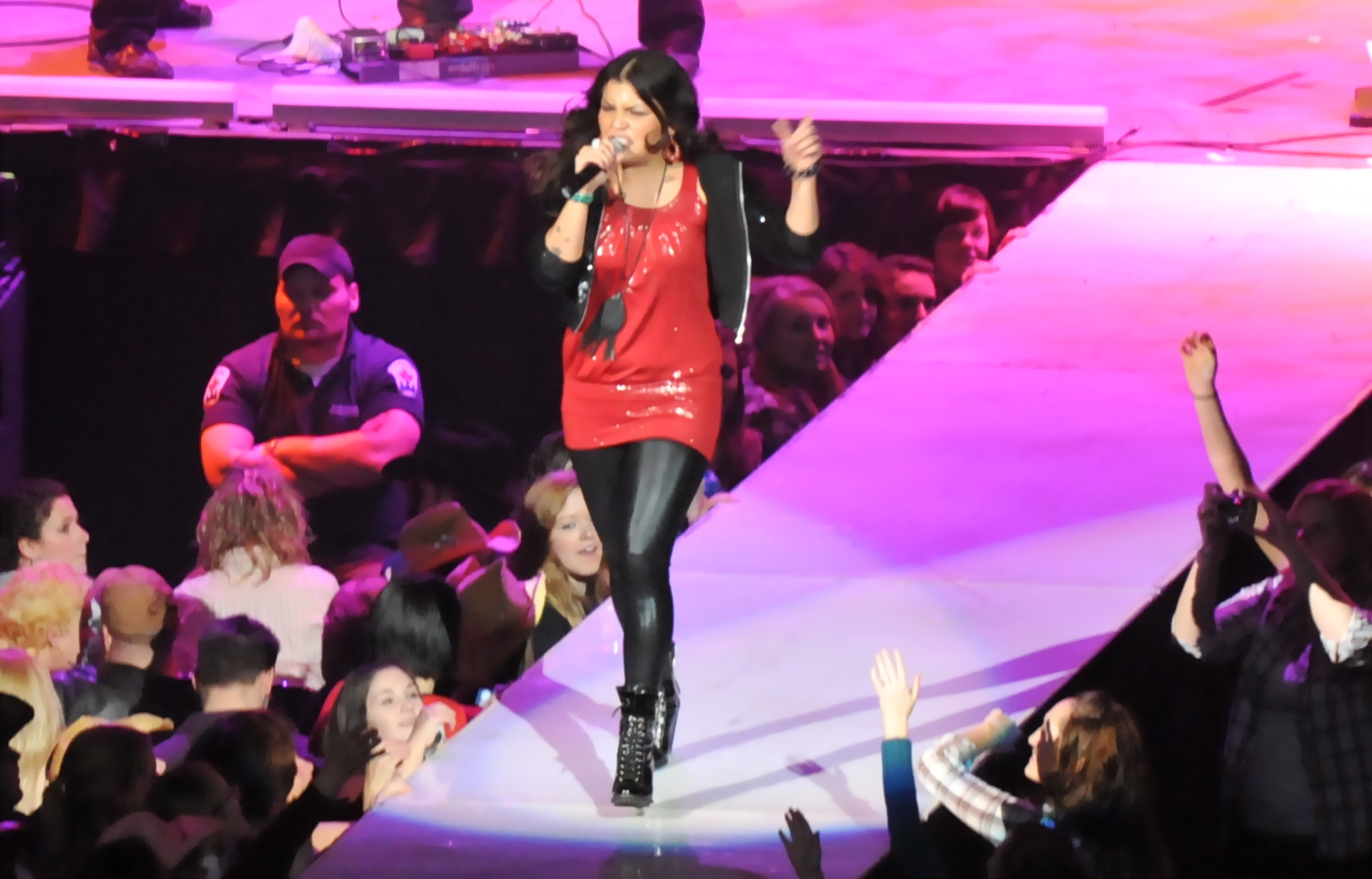
- Crystal Shawanda at Scotiabank Place, 14 February 2009, opening for Brad Paisley

Background information
- Born: July 26, 1983 (age 43); Wiikwemkoong, Ontario, Canada
- Genres: Country, Blues
- Occupations: Singer, songwriter, producer
- Instruments: Vocals, guitar
- Years active: 2008—present
- Labels: RCA Nashville, New Sun, True North Records
- Website: http://www.Crystalshawandamusic.com

Crystal Shawanda (born July 26, 1983) is an Ojibwe Potawatomi blues and country music artist from Canada. CMT documented her rise to fame in the six-part series Crystal: Living the Dream, which was broadcast in February 2008. Signed to RCA Nashville in 2007, she released her first single, "You Can Let Go", in Canada in January 2008. It was the fastest climbing single on the Canadian Country Singles Chart since Carolyn Dawn Johnson's "Georgia" in 2000, reaching the Top 10 in five weeks. It was released in the United States on February 25, 2008. and reached #2 on the American Mediabase chart. In 2009, she was named CCMA Female artist of the year and went on to win the JUNO award for Aboriginal Album of the Year in 2013. She became the first full blood Indigenous woman to appear in the Top 20 on the American Billboard Country chart, to sell over 300k records, and to sing at the Grand Ole Opry, and the first to appear in the Top 10 of the American Billboard Blues chart in 2022.

== Early life ==
Shawanda was born in Wiikwemkoong First Nation, Manitoulin Island, Ontario, where she began performing at 6 years old. She began acting with Debajemujig Theatre when she was 9, and began getting paid when she was 10. She recorded her first album in Nashville, TN, with Canadian producer Gary Buck, when she was 13. She spent her first 3 years of high school in Sault Ste. Marie, Ontario, where she attended Korah C. Her surname translates to "Dawn of a New Day", which was the inspiration of the title track of her debut album of the same name.

At 16, Crystal moved to Nashville, TN, where she busked on street corners, and sitting in at songwriters rounds, she moved back home to Wiikwemkoong for a couple years, and then back to Nashville again, she went back and forth one more time before permanently making it her home, and has been a resident ever since. Upon returning the final time she played for tips at Tootsie's Orchid Lounge on Broadway. She signed a publishing deal with Island Bound Music in 2014, and then signed a production deal with Scott Hendricks in 2015, and signed with RCA Records in 2016.

Many of Shawanda's songs have been inspired by her connections to Wiikwemkoong and part of her 2016 album was recorded at the Debajehmujig Creation Centre in Manitowaning, Manitoulin Island.

== Music career ==
Shawanda's first album, Dawn of a New Day, was released in Canada on June 24, 2008, and in the United States on August 19. The album entered the Canadian Country Albums chart at number 2, and the Billboard Top Country Albums chart at number 16. It became the highest charted album by a full-blooded Canadian First Nations country artist in the SoundScan era.

Shawanda toured with various artists across Canada and the northern United States in 2008. In 2009, she toured Canada and the United States with Brad Paisley and Dierks Bentley as a special guest on the Paisley Party 2009 tour. Her first single, "You Can Let Go", peaked at number 21 on the Hot Country Songs charts. In mid-2009, Shawanda left RCA Nashville and, through her own record label, New Sun Records, and a distribution deal with EMI released a Christmas album titled I'll Be Home for Christmas.

In 2010, Shawanda released a single, "Beautiful Day", via her own label, New Sun Records. Shawanda also performed at the Macy's Thanksgiving Day Parade in 2010, performing "Let's Come Together" and "This Is My Land". She then released another single, "Love Enough", on August 15, 2011, in both Canada and the United States, and in promotion she went on to tour with Reba. Shawanda's second studio album, Just Like You, was released by New Sun on April 24, 2012, and won a Juno award for Aboriginal Album of the year in 2013. She became the first full blood Indigenous woman as the CEO of a record label, to procure these milestones.

In 2014, Shawanda made a departure from country music and released a Blues album titled The Whole World's Got the Blues, she focused on rather than regurgitating someone else's blues, she told her story as an Indigenous woman in "Pray Sister Pray", which raised awareness of the Missing and Murdered Indigenous women issue, across Canada. She filmed a music video in her hometown with the help of her community, and the music video is now being used in schools across Canada, as a teaching tool of this rising issue. This album was nominated for "Aboriginal Album of the year", and Shawanda was invited to perform at the Juno Awards opening Gala.

In 2016, Shawanda released her 4th album Fish Out of Water, feeling torn between her future and her past, the album had a mix of Blues and country music songs, which ended up having am Americana sound. Perhaps best said by DMME.net "She's a force of nature, Crystal Shawanda, the Canadian singer may reside in Nashville, but her casting as a country artist, whitewashed as the genre demands, is hopefully over".

In 2017, Shawanda released Voo Doo Woman, consisting of 6 covers of blues standards, and 4 originals. Later that year Crystal signed a record deal with True North Records, who re-released the album later that year, and they achieved moderate airplay at Blues Radio in America.

In 2020, Shawanda released Church House Blues, which had extensive airplay at Blues Radio in America, and in Europe. She went on to become the first Indigenous woman to win a Juno award for "Blues album of the year" in 2021.

In 2022, Shawanda released Midnight Blues, which debuted at #8 on the American Billboard blues chart, and she became the first full blood Indigenous person to appear on this chart. She also received extensive airplay at Blues radio. The album was also nominated for a Juno award for "Blues album of the year" in 2023.

In 2025, Shawanda released Sing Pretty Blues, which received her third Juno award nomination for "Blues album of the year".

On August 27, 2026, Shawanda released the album Homesick Indian Blues accompanied by the single "Come unto Me".

== Discography ==
=== Studio albums ===
Title	Album details	Peak chart positions	
Title	Album details	US Country	US
Dawn of a New Day	Release date: June 24, 2008; Label: RCA Nashville	16	81
I'll Be Home for Christmas	Release date: December 1, 2009; Label: New Sun/EMI/On Ramp Records	—	—
Just Like You	Release date: April 24, 2012; Label: New Sun Records/Fontana North	—	—
The Whole World's Got the Blues	Release date: September 30, 2014; Label: New Sun Records	—	—
Fish Out of Water	Release date: October 2016; Label: New Sun Records	—	—
Voodoo Woman	Release date: October 31, 2017; Label: New Sun Records/Fontana North	—	—
Church House Blues	Release date: April 17, 2020; Label: True North Records	—	—
Midnight Blues	Release date: 2022; Label: True North Records	8	—
Sing Pretty Blues	Release date: April 11, 2025; Label: New Sun Records	—	—
Homesick Indian Blues	Release date: August 27, 2026; Label: New Sun Records	—	—
"—" denotes releases that did not chart or were not released to that territory

=== Singles ===
Year	Single	Peak positions			Album
Year	Single	CAN Country	CAN	US Country	Album
2008	"You Can Let Go"^{[a]}	5	60	21	Dawn of a New Day
2008	"What Do I Have to Do"	5	79	—	Dawn of a New Day
2008	"My Roots Are Showing"	12	87	57	Dawn of a New Day
2009	"Dawn of a New Day"	7	90	—	Dawn of a New Day
2009	"Try"	24	—	—	Dawn of a New Day
2010	"Beautiful Day"	39	—	—	Just Like You
2010	"Fight for Me"	—	—	—	Just Like You
2011	"This Fever"	—	—	—	Just Like You
2011	"Love Enough"	—	—	—	Just Like You
2012	"Closer"	32	—	—	Just Like You
2012	"Down on Broadway"	—	—	—	Just Like You
2012	"Chains"	—	—	—	Just Like You
2013	"Someone Who Loves You"	—	—	—	Just Like You
2016	"Laid Back"	—	—	—	Fish Out of Water
2025	"Would You Know Love"	—	—	—	Sing Pretty Blues
2026	"Come unto Me"	—	—	—	Homesick Indian Blues
"—" denotes releases that did not chart or were not released to that territory

Notes

- a "You Can Let Go" also reached number nine on the Bubbling Under Hot 100 Singles chart.

==== As a featured artist ====
Year	Single	Peak positions	Album
Year	Single	CAN Country	Album
2009	"In Your Arms Again" (George Canyon featuring Crystal Shawanda)	16	What I Do

=== Music videos ===
Year	Video	Director
2008	"You Can Let Go"	Margaret Malandruccolo
2009	"I'll Be Home for Christmas"	
2010	"Beautiful Day"	Stephano Barberis
2012	"Down on Broadway"	

== Awards and nominations ==
Year	Organization	Category	Result
2008	Aboriginal Peoples Choice Awards	Best New Artist of the Year	Won
2008	Aboriginal Peoples Choice Awards	Best Country Album of the Year - Dawn of a New Day	Won
2008	Aboriginal Peoples Choice Awards	Best Single of the Year - "You Can Let Go"	Won
2008	Canadian Aboriginal Music Awards	Best Artist of the Year	Won
2008	Canadian Aboriginal Music Awards	Best Album of the Year - Dawn of a New Day	Won
2008	Canadian Aboriginal Music Awards	Best Country Album of the Year	Won
2008	Canadian Aboriginal Music Awards	Best Music Video of the Year - "You Can Let Go"	Won
2008	Canadian Aboriginal Music Awards	Best Single of the Year - "You Can Let Go"	Won
2008	Canadian Country Music Association	Single of the Year - "You Can Let Go"	Nominated
2008	Canadian Country Music Association	Female Artist of the Year	Nominated
2008	Canadian Country Music Association	Program/Special of the Year	Nominated
2009	Canadian Country Music Association	Album of the Year - Dawn of a New Day	Nominated
2009	Canadian Country Music Association	Female Artist of the Year	Won
2009	Canadian Radio Music Awards	Best New Country Artist	Won
2009	Juno Awards	Best New Artist	Nominated
2009	Juno Awards	Country Recording of the Year	Nominated
2010	Canadian Country Music Association	Female Artist of the Year	Nominated
2013	Juno Awards	Aboriginal Album of the Year	Won
2015	Juno Awards	Aboriginal Album of the Year	Nominated
2017	Juno Awards	Indigenous Music Album of the Year	Nominated
2017	Indigenous Music Awards	Best Producer/Engineer (for New Sun Records – Missy Knott/My Sister's Heart)	Nominated
