= Just Like You (Crystal Shawanda album) =

Studio album by Crystal Shawanda
- Released: April 24, 2012
- Genre: Country
- Label: New Sun

Crystal Shawanda chronology
I'll Be Home for Christmas (2009)	Just Like You (2012)	The Whole World's Got the Blues (2014)

Singles from Just Like You
- 1. "Beautiful Day" Released: March 2010; 2. "Fight for Me" Released: November 1, 2010; 3. "This Fever" Released: May 2011; 4. "Love Enough" Released: August 15, 2011; 5. "Closer" Released: January 2, 2012; 6. "Down on Broadway" Released: May 28, 2012; 7. "Chains" Released: September 2012; 8. "Someone Who Loves You" Released: January 2013

Professional ratings
Review scores
Source	Rating
Leader-Post	link

Just Like You is the third studio album by the Canadian country music artist Crystal Shawanda. It was released in Canada on April 24, 2012, via Shawanda's own New Sun Records and distributed by Fontana North. The album received three and a half stars out of five from Jeff DeDekker of the Leader-Post.

"Just Like You" was awarded 'Best Aboriginal Album of the Year' at the 2013 Juno Awards.

== Track listing ==
No.	Title	Length
1.	"Closer"	3:24
2.	"Someone Who Loves You"	2:58
3.	"Beautiful Day"	3:02
4.	"Chains"	3:53
5.	"Love Enough"	3:22
6.	"Slippin' Away"	3:14
7.	"Down on Broadway"	3:14
8.	"Burning This Love Down"	3:18
9.	"Fight for Me"	3:18
10.	"The Chance You Take"	4:02
11.	"My Baby Makes My Day"	3:44
12.	"This Fever"	2:55
13.	"Just Like You"	3:38
14.	"Helpless"	4:08
15.	"After I'm Gone"	3:08
