= What I Do (George Canyon album) =

Studio album by George Canyon
- Released: November 11, 2008
- Recorded: Renegade Studios, The Tin Ear, Reiny Dawg Studios, Mountain View Studios
- Genre: Country
- Length: 48:37
- Label: 604
- Producer: Richard Marx, Chad Kroeger

George Canyon chronology
Classics (2007)	What I Do (2008)	Better Be Home Soon (2011)

Singles from What I Do
- 1. "Just Like You" Released: September 29, 2008; 2. "All or Nothing" Released: January 19, 2009; 3. "Let It Out" Released: June 8, 2009; 4. "Betty's Buns" Released: September 14, 2009; 5. "In Your Arms Again" Released: November 9, 2009; 6. "I Believe in Angels" Released: February 8, 2010; 7. "Pretty Drunk Out Tonight" Released: June 21, 2010

What I Do is the sixth studio album by Canadian country music artist George Canyon. The album was released on November 11, 2008 by 604 Records. Its first single, "Just Like You," peaked at number 64 on the Canadian Hot 100.

== Track listing ==
No.	Title	Writer(s)	Length
1.	"Just Like You"	George Canyon, Richard Marx, Gary Harrison	3:08
2.	"Pretty Drunk Out Tonight"	G. Canyon, Harrison	3:09
3.	"All or Nothing"	G. Canyon, Marx, Trey Bruce	3:49
4.	"Let It Out"	G. Canyon, Johnny Reid	3:16
5.	"In Your Arms Again" (duet with Crystal Shawanda)	G. Canyon, Marx	4:24
6.	"Back to Life"	G. Canyon, Marx	3:44
7.	"Betty's Buns"	G. Canyon, Jennifer Canyon	3:07
8.	"If I Was Jesus"	Chuck Cannon, Phil Madeira	3:43
9.	"Fool in Me"	G. Canyon, Marx, Harrison	3:12
10.	"What I Do"	G. Canyon	3:37
11.	"Last Man"	G. Canyon, Harrison	2:48
12.	"Second Chance"	G. Canyon, Marx, Chad Kroeger	4:11
13.	"I Believe in Angels"	Jeremy Campbell, Reid	3:42
14.	"Just Like You" (acoustic version)	G. Canyon, Marx, Harrison	2:47

== Chart performance ==
=== Singles ===
Year	Single	Peak positions
Year	Single	CAN
2008	"Just Like You"	64
2009	"All or Nothing"	99
2009	"Let It Out"	86
2009	"Betty's Buns"	92
2009	"In Your Arms Again"	—
2010	"I Believe in Angels"	85
2010	"Pretty Drunk Out Tonight"	—
"—" denotes releases that did not chart
