= Recoil (2011 film) =

- Domestic release art
- Directed by: Terry Miles
- Written by: John Sullivan
- Produced by: Jack Nasser
- Starring: Steve Austin; Danny Trejo; Serinda Swan; Keith Jardine; Lochlyn Munro
- Cinematography: Bruce Chun
- Edited by: Trevor Mirosh; Gordon Rempel
- Music by: Eiko Ishiwata
- Release dates: March 6, 2012 (U.S.); March 13, 2012 (Canada)
- Running time: 94 minutes
- Countries: Canada; United States
- Language: English
- Box office: $125,912 (select territories)

Recoil is a 2011 Canadian-American action film directed by Terry Miles and starring Steve Austin, Danny Trejo, Serinda Swan and Keith Jardine. It premiered in the United States on 6 March 2012.

The story concerns a fugitive vigilante who roams the Northwestern U.S., hunting down the people responsible for the murder of his family, while running away from the FBI's investigation into his killings. He finds out that his latest victim was the brother of a powerful gunrunner whose biker gang controls the area, and who in turn wants revenge.

== Plot ==
Ryan Varrett, is an ex-cop determined to avenge the murder of his family. In 2009, when Ryan was a cop in Dallas, Texas, his wife Constance Marie Varrett and 9-year-old son Matt Ryan Varrett were viciously killed by a gang. Ryan survived the assault and killed three of the gang. However, Ryan quits the Dallas police and hits the road to find everyone else responsible for the deaths of his loved ones. Special Agent Frank Sutton of the FBI's Seattle office is investigating the deaths of criminals.

After killing a rapist named Dale James Burrows, Ryan ends up in the small town of Hope, Washington, where a gas station owner named Kirby directs Ryan to a tiny hotel run by a woman named Darcy. Ryan finds Rex Ray Santiago, a member of the gang that attacked Ryan's family. It turns out that Hope is under the control of the Circle, a drug and arms dealing biker gang led by Rex's brother, Drayke Santiago, who is on the ATF's most wanted list. Sheriff Cole is in Drayke's pocket, so Ryan has only himself and Darcy to depend on.

Ryan kills Rex, Drayke declares war on Ryan, and the town of Hope becomes a battleground. It turns out that Drayke masterminded the shooting of Ryan's family members, and the families of other cops who years ago sent him to prison, where he was brutalized. Drayke got even with the prisoners who brutalized him, then got even with the cops who put him away. After Kirby is killed by Crab, Drayke's right-hand man, Sutton arrives in town, and Cole tries to convince him that Rex's death was an accident. Cole thinks that by appeasing the bikers, he is protecting the town from more bloodshed. Ryan finds Crab and burns him to death.

Since Cole is not much help, Sutton goes to Cole's son, Deputy Hedge, who is not in Drayke's pocket. Hedge explains that a long-time ago, the Circle used to protect the town. That was before Drayke took over and started running guns. Rex provided Drayke with a recipe for meth, and Drayke and his gang started selling drugs too. However, Drayke and his gang are arming themselves for all-out war against Ryan, and they don't care whom they have to kill. At night, Darcy hears bikers approaching her hotel. Ryan kills the three bikers. Outside, more bikers grab Darcy and beat Ryan up.

On the next day, Ryan has been taken to Drayke, and some of his men bring Darcy into the room. Darcy is held tied up with tape on her mouth. They're on an abandoned ferry boat that Drayke uses as his headquarters. Drayke leaves his man Prospect to beat Ryan up. Ryan breaks free from his restraints and takes care of Prospect. Ryan overcomes Drayke's men, finds Darcy who is tied to a chair and gagged with tape. Deputy Hedge goes to his father's house and finds Cole has shot himself dead. With Sutton's help Hedge plans to go after Drayke.

Ryan remembers Drayke being present during the attack on his family. Until Ryan came to Hope, Drayke thought Ryan was dead. Ryan and Drayke start fighting. A shot kills Drayke. It was Sutton who fired the shot. Darcy decides that she's going to stay in Hope, and Sutton decides to not arrest Ryan. Hedge becomes the new sheriff. Ryan decides to leave town, but promises Darcy that he will send her a postcard to let her know where he is.

== Cast ==
- Steve Austin as Ryan Varrett
- Serinda Swan as Darcy
- Danny Trejo as Drayke Santiago
- Keith Jardine as "Crab"
- Lochlyn Munro as FBI Agent Frank Sutton
- Noel Gugliemi as Rex "Highwayman" Santiago
- Adam Greydon Reid as Deputy Hedge
- Tom McBeath as Sheriff Cole
- Patrick Gilmore as Kirby
- Tygh Runyan as The Prospect
- Rebecca Robbins as Connie Varrett
- Connor Stanhope as Matt Varrett
- Roman Podhora as Dale Burrows
- Daniel Boileau as Frank
- Jase Anthony Griffith as Lou
- Robin Nielsen as FBI Agent Ray Davies
- J. Douglas Stewart as L.T. Carver
- Patrick Sabongui as "Jester"

== Production ==
Following Tactical Force, Recoil reunited Steve Austin with UFC fighter Keith Jardine and producers the Nasser brothers (who bankrolled a series of Austin vehicles between 2008 and 2012). Key crew members also returned, such as fight choreographer/second unit director Lauro Chartrand, cinematographer Bruce Chun, editor Gordon Rempel and production designer Tony Devenyi. Director Terry Miles, however, was a newcomer to the action genre, as his first two films were intimate dramatic comedies. The second, A Night for Dying Tigers, was accepted into the World Cinema selection of the 2010 Toronto International Film Festival but was not profitable, so he signed up for a more commercial picture to rekindle his career.

The film was shot around Fraser Valley in British Columbia, Canada. The cities of Abbotsford, Agassiz, Burnaby, Langley and Maple Ridge were visited over the course of principal photography, which wrapped up on 14 May 2011. This was Danny Trejo's second time doing a fight with a pro wrestler (after a deleted scene with Dallas Page for The Devil's Rejects), a process he found more enjoyable than with any traditional actor, due to their experience staging confrontations for an audience. As in Tactical Force and other films of this period, Austin was doubled by Canadian Paul Lazenby, a former pro wrestler himself.

== Reception ==
=== Critical reception ===
Recoil has received moderately positive reviews, with critics noting—to varying degrees of appreciation—its departure from the flashier style seen in many contemporary action films. Luke Hickman of High Def Digest called its revenge storyline a throwback to a "not so awesome past". Jeffrey Kauffman of blu-ray.com was unenthusiastic about the film's themes, but gave it some praise for its non-linear structure. Jason Rugaard of Movie Mavericks felt that "the story hangs together better than most in the genre".

David J. Moore, author of the book The Good, the Tough & the Deadly: Action Movies & Stars, called it Austin's best film, pointing to John Sullivan's "surprisingly smart" script and Miles' "assured" direction. R. Emmet Sweeney, a writer for Film Comment and Filmmaker, concurred and praised Miles' "measured pacing and clear lines". Kauffman disagreed, calling Recoil "competent" but devoid of truly exciting action scenes. Chad Cruise of Bulletproof Action similarly found the film unspectacular yet easy to watch. Genre critic Vern enjoyed Austin's performance, elements of which harkened back to his classic "Stone Cold" persona. Matt Paprocki of doblu.com countered that Austin's character arc was "aimless and dry". Several reviewers pointed to the villains' lack of charisma, with Rugaard writing that Danny Trejo (who was 67 at the time of filming) appeared too old for some of the physical confrontations his character engages in.

=== Accolades ===
In a survey of seventeen genre pundits jointly organized by five action film websites in 2020, Recoil was ranked 46th of the "Top 50 Action Gems of the 2010–2019 Decade". In 2012, the film received a Leo Award for Best Stunt Coordination (Feature Film) from the Motion Picture Arts & Sciences Foundation of British Columbia.

Year	Award	Category	Recipient	Result
2012	Leo Awards	Best Stunt Coordination – Feature Length Drama	Lauro Chartrand	Won

== Release ==
In the United States, the film was released on home video by Vivendi Entertainment on 6 March 2012. Entertainment One released it on 13 March 2012 in Canada, and on 16 April 2012 in the United Kingdom. Like Tactical Force, Recoil received a theatrical release in the United Arab Emirates, opening on 12 April 2014 and ranking fifth at the national box office.

== Illegal downloading ==
In 2012, a Canadian judge ruled in favour of Recoil's production company, NGN Prima Production, and ordered Internet service providers (ISPs) to reveal the names and addresses of people who had allegedly downloaded the film illegally. This was only possible due to recent changes in Canadian law, making it the first lawsuit of its kind in the country. One of the named ISPs filed a motion opposing the disclosure of its customers' personal information.
