= Better Be Home Soon (album) =

Studio album by George Canyon
- Released: March 22, 2011
- Genre: Country
- Length: 49:04
- Label: Reiny Dawg
- Producers: Richard Marx; George Canyon

George Canyon chronology
What I Do (2008)	Better Be Home Soon (2011)	Classics II (2012)

Singles from Better Be Home Soon
- 1. "Better Be Home Soon" Released: November 1, 2010; 2. "Surrender" Released: March 21, 2011; 3. "Sunshine" Released: July 11, 2011; 4. "When Love Is All You've Got" Released: October 3, 2011

Better Be Home Soon is the seventh studio album by Canadian country music artist George Canyon. The album was released on March 22, 2011 by Reiny Dawg and distributed by Universal Music Canada. It debuted at number 25 on the Canadian Albums Chart. Its title track, a cover of the 1988 Crowded House song, peaked at number 87 on the Billboard Canadian Hot 100. The album has been certified Gold by Music Canada.

== Track listing ==
No.	Title	Writer(s)	Length
1.	"Never Miss Your Water"	Chris Byrne, George Canyon, Mike Little	3:14
2.	"Every Shade of Gone"	Canyon, Gary Harrison, Richard Marx	3:13
3.	"Better Be Home Soon"	Neil Finn	4:09
4.	"Surrender"	Trey Bruce, Marx	3:22
5.	"When Love Is All You've Got" (with Richard Marx)	Marx, Kenny Rogers	4:05
6.	"Power of You and Me"	Marx	3:48
7.	"When November Falls"	Marx, Matt Scannell	4:38
8.	"Lonesome"	Canyon, Marx, Scannell	4:19
9.	"That's Where You Came In"	Bruce, Canyon, Marx	3:45
10.	"Real Thing"	Canyon, Harrison, Marx	3:35
11.	"Crawfish Crawl"	Byrne, Canyon, Little	3:33
12.	"Sunshine"	Catt Gravitt, Thom Hardwell, Gerald O'Brien	3:31
13.	"Sacrifice"	Dean Brody, Canyon	3:52
Total length:			49:04

== Chart performance ==
=== Album ===
Chart (2011)	Peak position
Canadian Albums Chart	25

=== Singles ===
Year	Single	Peak positions
Year	Single	CAN
2010	"Better Be Home Soon"	87
2011	"Surrender"	98
2011	"Sunshine"	96
2011	"When Love Is All You've Got" (with Richard Marx)	—
"—" denotes releases that did not chart

== Certifications ==
Region	Certification
Canada (Music Canada)	Gold
