= Tanis (podcast) =

Horror fiction podcast

- Genre: Mystery; Horror; Pseudo-documentary
- Language: English

Cast and voices
- Hosted by: Nic Silver

Production
- Production: Terry Miles

Technical specifications
- Audio format: Podcast (via streaming or downloadable MP3)

Publication
- No. of seasons: 5
- No. of episodes: 60
- Original release: October 13, 2015 – November 18, 2020
- Updates: Biweekly (seasons 1–4); Weekly (season 5)

Related
- Website: www.tanispodcast.com

Tanis is a mystery pseudo-documentary podcast. Published by Pacific Northwest Stories, it is part of their series of podcasts set in the same fictional universe (such as The Black Tapes and Rabbits) which, despite being works of fiction, are presented as legitimate true stories both within the podcast and outside of it; the podcast has no credited writers or performers, as the events and characters are framed as real. The main character, Nic Silver, is voiced by executive producer Terry Miles.

In the podcast, Silver undertakes a search to discover the meaning of "Tanis", a word of unknown meaning that seems connected to various elusive individuals and organizations, leading him to unearth a web of conspiracies with the help of an internet "information specialist" known only as "Meerkatnip".

After its premiere on October 13, 2015, episodes of Tanis were released every two weeks during the first four seasons and weekly during the fifth. Critical reception of the show was positive and it peaked on the U.S. iTunes podcast download chart in the eleventh spot. A television adaptation of the podcast was planned in 2017 and the fifth season of the podcast premiered on September 2, 2020.

== Content ==
=== Synopsis ===
Nic Silver, a former radio host, discovers references to something called Tanis in two disparate sources. He begins hosting the podcast in an effort to determine what and where Tanis may be, quickly enlisting the help of an "information specialist" known via the username Meerkatnip. Silver comes to believe that Tanis is currently somewhere in the Puget Sound area. His search, aided with information provided by Meerkatnip, leads him to confront a variety of mysterious groups and organizations: Tesla Nova Corporation, a group Silver calls "The Cult of Tanis", and a group known as the Grackles.

=== Format ===
Tanis is a mystery horror podcast released every two weeks on iTunes and other services. Terry Miles, with the production company Public Radio Alliance, serves as the show's executive producer and provides the voice work for Silver, who Miles refers to as his "cousin" and who is listed as the show's other executive producer. Episodes of the show take approximately one week to plot and write, another week to record, and two weeks to mix, edit, and score. Dialogue is recorded where it occurs in the narrative, such that a scene which takes place in Tanis in a living room would be recorded in an actual living room. Tanis is scored with backing music and features a musical intro song by Miles's former band, Ashley Park. Financial support for the podcast comes from listeners via Patreon and sponsors, for whose products and services ads are integrated into the production.

The podcast was described as "deep fiction" by The Guardian because, while it blends real-world and fictional events and people into its narrative, the show's creators and characters never acknowledge that the podcast is fictitious. The podcast, according to Molly Osberg in Vice, occurs in a world that "isn't so much an alternate reality as [a world] that hovers comfortably adjacent to ours." In addition to the regular episodes, Miles also produces a variety of supporting documents and interviews which he posts on the show's official website in order to lend plausibility to the notion that the events of the show may be real. Tanis mimics the successful format of the earlier nonfictional investigative podcast Serial, notably its "unpretentious narrative style and mystery 'plot'". It is one of a spate of podcasts released in the wake of Serial's first season in 2014 that remixed those elements of Serial with the horror and mystery genres, other such podcasts including Alice Isn't Dead, Ars Paradoxica, and Tanis sister show The Black Tapes.

=== Themes ===
Themes of powerlessness and uneasy alliance with a (possible) enemy are present in Tanis's narrative. Michael J. Collins described a pattern in mystery horror podcasts of narrators existing within uncertain personal or professional situations, such as Silver's inconsistent work and sleep schedules, which mimic "the lifestyles of overworked, yet unremunerated, Millennials." Collins wrote that Tanis evoked millennial economic unease when Silver accepts aid in his investigation from Tesla Nova Corporation and thus becomes complicit with the organization Silver believes may be responsible for the goings-on he is investigating.

== Episodes ==
=== Season 1 (2015–16) ===
No.	Title	Original release date	Prod. code
1	"Seeking Tanis, Runner Available"	October 13, 2015	101
2	"Radio, Radio"	October 13, 2015	102
3	"The Girl in the High Tower"	October 19, 2015	103
4	"The End of Rocketman"	November 3, 2015	104
5	"A Rat, a Writer and a Conspiracy Theory"	November 18, 2015	105
6	"The Servant Girl Annihilator"	December 1, 2015	106
7	"A Dungeon Masters Guide to Tanis"	December 16, 2015	107
8	"Raywood, WA: Population One"	January 6, 2016	108
9	"A Man, a Milkshake, and a Serial Murderer"	January 19, 2016	109
10	"The Grackles"	February 3, 2016	110
11	"Eld Fen"	February 17, 2016	111
12	"The Map"	March 2, 2016	112

=== Season 2 (2016) ===
No. overall	No. in series	Title	Original release date	Prod. code
13	1	"The Wall"	April 20, 2016	201
14	2	"Levity Elks"	May 4, 2016	202
15	3	"Pacifica"	May 18, 2016	203
16	4	"The Alameter Line"	May 31, 2016	204
17	5	"A Message, a Manuscript, and a Russian Picnic"	June 15, 2016	205
18	6	"Phyreses and Aries"	June 29, 2016	206
19	7	"Devil's Fingers"	July 27, 2016	207
20	8	"The Map to Heaven"	August 10, 2016	208
21	9	"Was It the Red King, Kitty?"	August 23, 2016	209
22	10	"The Voice in the Darkness"	September 7, 2016	210
23	11	"Once More unto the Breach"	September 21, 2016	211
24	12	"We Get What We Deserve"	October 5, 2016	212

=== Season 3 (2017) ===
No. overall	No. in series	Title	Original release date	Prod. code
25	1	"Frances Manners' Place in the Woods"	February 21, 2017	301
26	2	"The Office of Alien Property"	March 8, 2017	302
27	3	"An Artifact, an Adorcist, and an Asylum"	March 21, 2017	303
28	4	"The Lines of Alaise"	April 5, 2017	304
29	5	"Elements and Artifacts"	April 19, 2017	305
30	6	"Brother, Where Art Thou?"	May 3, 2017	306
31	7	"God in the Machine"	May 31, 2017	307
32	8	"The Second Barrier Study"	June 14, 2017	308
33	9	"The Taskers, the Smallwater, and Lovecraft's Friend"	June 28, 2017	309
34	10	"The Ath"	July 12, 2017	310
35	11	"Feathers or Fur?"	July 26, 2017	311
36	12	"Between There and Here"	August 9, 2017	312

=== Season 4 (2018) ===
No. overall	No. in series	Title	Original release date	Prod. code
37	1	"The Russian Breach"	February 28, 2018	401
38	2	"The Pipes Are Calling"	March 13, 2018	402
39	3	"Gavdos, Ramtha, and the Atlas"	March 28, 2018	403
40	4	"The Earth Coincidence Control Office"	April 11, 2018	404
41	5	"Ra Ra Rasputin"	April 25, 2018	405
42	6	"The Faith of Flowers"	May 9, 2018	406
43	7	"Is the Hitchhiker Male or Female?"	June 6, 2018	407
44	8	"What I Think of When I Think of Green"	June 20, 2018	408
45	9	"Remote Control"	July 4, 2018	409
46	10	"Nobody Can Send Me a Letter"	July 18, 2018	410
47	11	"The Three In One God"	August 1, 2018	411
48	12	"Beyond the Real"	August 15, 2018	412

=== Season 5 (2020) ===
No. overall	No. in series	Title	Original release date	Prod. code
49	1	"Pacifica Redux"	September 2, 2020	501
50	2	"The Garrison Anomaly"	September 9, 2020	502
51	3	"The Mourntree"	September 16, 2020	503
52	4	"Weaving Spiders Come Not Here"	September 23, 2020	504
53	5	"Dangerous Things, Magical Things, and All That"	September 30, 2020	505
54	6	"For the Harmonious Development of Man"	October 7, 2020	506
55	7	"The Heart of the Destroyer"	October 14, 2020	507
56	8	"Manhattan, Arachne, and an Angry Demon Tooth"	October 21, 2020	508
57	9	"Corpus Callosum"	October 28, 2020	509
58	10	"The Thing from Karsas"	November 4, 2020	510
59	11	"The Long Stone"	November 11, 2020	511
60	12	"The Fifth Gate"	November 18, 2020	512

== Reception ==
Tanis received critical acclaim. Melissa Locker, writing in The Guardian described the podcast, as well as sister show The Black Tapes, as "compelling and wildly addictive." The scholars Danielle Hancock and Leslie McMurtry described the podcast as "elegantly illustrat[ing] the new Gothic horror podcast paradigm" on account of its production value, attentiveness to the possibilities of the podcast format, and in-universe connections with traditional elements of Gothic fiction. In Bustle, Lucia Peters praised the melding of real-world and fictional elements in Tanis's narrative, calling the podcast "a fascinating, if somewhat confusing, ride." Tanis peaked on the U.S. iTunes podcast download chart at number 11.

== Television adaptation ==
In 2017, Universal Cable Productions and Dark Horse Entertainment announced a deal to adapt Tanis for television, led by Miles and television writer Lee Shipman. Sam Raimi and Debbie Liebling will serve as the show's producers.
