= Home for Christmas (George Canyon album) =

Studio album by George Canyon
- Released: 8 November 2005
- Genre: Country
- Length: 22:28
- Label: Universal South
- Producer: George Canyon

George Canyon chronology
One Good Friend (2004)	Home for Christmas (2005)	Somebody Wrote Love (2006)

Home for Christmas is a Christmas album by Canadian country music singer George Canyon.

== Track listing ==
1. Rudolph the Red-Nosed Reindeer (Johnny Marks) – 2:05
2. Blue Christmas (Billy Hayes/Jay W. Johnson) – 4:08
3. Away in a Manger (Traditional) – 3:21
4. Frosty the Snowman (Walter E. "Jack" Rollins/Steve Nelson) – 3:13
5. What Child Is This? (William Chatterton Dix) – 2:48
6. Silent Night (Franz Gruber/Josef Mohr) – 4:18
7. Santa's On His Way – 2:35
