= Dawn of a New Day (Crystal Shawanda album) =

Studio album by Crystal Shawanda
- Released: June 24, 2008 (CAN); August 19, 2008 (US)
- Genre: Country
- Length: 38:25
- Label: RCA Nashville
- Producer: Scott Hendricks

Crystal Shawanda chronology
Dawn of a New Day (2008)	I'll Be Home for Christmas (2009)

Singles from Dawn of a New Day
- 1. "You Can Let Go" Released: January 7, 2008; 2. "What Do I Have to Do" Released: May 27, 2008; 3. "My Roots Are Showing" Released: October 20, 2008; 4. "Dawn of a New Day" Released: January 27, 2009; 5. "Try" Released: June 8, 2009

Dawn of a New Day is the debut studio album by Canadian country music singer Crystal Shawanda. It was released in Canada on June 24, 2008, and in the United States on August 19. It produced five singles in "You Can Let Go", "What Do I Have to Do", "My Roots Are Showing", the title track and "Try". "You Can Let Go" reached number 21 on the Hot Country Songs charts.

Shawanda was born in Wiikwemkoong First Nation, Manitoulin Island, Ontario and her surname translates to "Dawn of a New Day".

== Track listing ==
No.	Title	Writer(s)	Length
1.	"Evolution"	Franne Golde, Marv Green, Kasey Livingston, Andrew Williams	4:36
2.	"My Roots Are Showing"	Robin Lee Bruce, Christi Dannemiller, Whitney Duncan	3:33
3.	"Tender Side"	Crystal Shawanda, Mark Selby, Tia Sillers	3:02
4.	"Baby You're Back"	John Rich, Sharon Vaughn, Gretchen Wilson	3:03
5.	"Dawn of a New Day"	Shawanda, Jamie Paulin, Jeremy Stover, Dewayne Strobel	3:33
6.	"You Can Let Go"	Cory Batten, Kent Blazy, Rory Feek	3:34
7.	"I Need a Man"	Brett James, Hillary Lindsey, Aimee Mayo	3:28
8.	"What Do I Have to Do"	Trey Bruce, Leah Crutchfield	3:34
9.	"Your Cheatin' Heart"	Hank Williams	2:57
10.	"Try"	Ed Hill, Luke Laird, Lindsey	3:32
11.	"You Can't Take It Back"	Shawanda, Brad Warren, Brett Warren	3:31

== Personnel ==
- Bruce Bouton - lap steel guitar, pedal steel guitar
- Mike Brignardello - bass guitar
- Pat Buchanan - electric guitar
- Tom Bukovac - electric guitar
- Lisa Cochran - background vocals
- Perry Coleman - background vocals
- J.T. Corenflos - electric guitar
- Melodie Crittenden - background vocals
- Rob Hajacos - fiddle
- Tony Harrell - Hammond B-3 organ, piano, synthesizer
- Aubrey Haynie - fiddle, mandolin
- Mike Johnson - pedal steel guitar
- Troy Lancaster - acoustic guitar, electric guitar
- B. James Lowry - acoustic guitar
- Chris McHugh - drums
- Gene Miller - background vocals
- Greg Morrow - drums, percussion
- Gordon Mote - Hammond B-3 organ, piano, synthesizer, Wurlitzer
- Crystal Shawanda - lead vocals
- Jimmie Lee Sloas - bass guitar
- DeWayne Strobel - electric guitar
- Bryan Sutton - acoustic guitar
- Russell Terrell - background vocals
- Bobby Terry - acoustic guitar
- Jonathan Yudkin - fiddle, mandolin, strings

== Chart performance ==
=== Album ===
Chart (2008)	Peak position
U.S. Billboard Top Country Albums	16
U.S. Billboard 200	81

=== Singles ===
Year	Single	Peak chart positions	
Year	Single	CAN	US Country
2008	"You Can Let Go"^{[a]}	60	21
2008	"What Do I Have to Do"	79	—
2008	"My Roots Are Showing"	87	57
2009	"Dawn of a New Day"	90	—
2009	"Try"	—	—
"—" denotes releases that did not chart

== Notes ==
- a "You Can Let Go" also reached number nine on the Bubbling Under Hot 100 Singles chart.
