= The Order (TV series) =

2019 American horror drama series

- Genre: Horror; Drama; Supernatural
- Created by: Dennis Heaton
- Starring: Jake Manley; Sarah Grey; Matt Frewer; Katharine Isabelle; Max Martini; Louriza Tronco
- Composer: Patric Caird
- Countries of origin: Canada; United States
- Original language: English
- No. of seasons: 2
- No. of episodes: 20

Production
- Executive producers: Chad Oakes; Michael Frislev; Dennis Heaton; Shelley Eriksen; David Von Ancken
- Producers: Petros Danabassis; Jay Daniel Beechinor; Morris Chapdelaine; Justis Greene; Todd Giroux
- Cinematography: Mark Chow; Ryan Purcell
- Editors: Christopher A. Smith; Lara Mazur
- Camera setup: Single-camera
- Running time: 42–51 minutes
- Production company: Nomadic Pictures

Original release
- Network: Netflix
- Release: March 7, 2019 – June 18, 2020

The Order is a horror drama television series created by Dennis Heaton that ran for two seasons streaming on Netflix. It was written by Heaton, Shelley Eriksen, Rachel Langer, Jennica Harper, Penny Gummerson, and Jason Filiatrault. The series premiered on Netflix on March 7, 2019. The series stars Jake Manley, Sarah Grey, Matt Frewer, Sam Trammell, Katharine Isabelle, and Max Martini.

In March 2019, it was announced that the series was renewed for a 10-episode second season that was released on June 18, 2020. In November 2020, the series was canceled after two seasons.

== Premise ==
The Order follows college student Jack Morton as he joins the Hermetic Order of the Blue Rose, a secret society that teaches and practices magic. As Jack goes deeper into the organization's history, he uncovers dark family secrets and an underground battle between werewolves and the magical dark arts.

== Cast and characters ==
=== Main ===
- Jake Manley as Jack Morton, a freshman college student at Belgrave University and a new recruit who joins both the Hermetic Order of the Blue Rose and the Knights of Saint Christopher
- Sarah Grey as Alyssa Drake, a college student and university tour guide and a medicum of the Hermetic Order of the Blue Rose
- Matt Frewer as Pete "Pops" Morton (season 1), Jack's grandfather who is obsessed with taking down Edward Coventry
- Max Martini as Edward Coventry (season 1), Jack's estranged father and the grand magus of the Hermetic Order of the Blue Rose
- Louriza Tronco as Gabrielle Dupres (season 2, recurring season 1), an acolyte in the Hermetic Order of the Blue Rose

=== Recurring ===
- Sam Trammell as Eric Clarke (season 1, guest season 2), an Ethics professor at Belgrave University
- Adam DiMarco as Randall Carpio, one of the resident advisors at Belgrave University and a member of the Knights of Saint Christopher
- Katharine Isabelle as Vera Stone, the chancellor at Belgrave University and, initially, a temple magus who later becomes grand magus of the Hermetic Order of the Blue Rose
- Aaron Hale as Brandon Caruthers, an acolyte in the Order
- Jedidiah Goodacre as Kyle (season 1, guest season 2), a Magistratus of the Order and Brandon's mentor
- Sean Depner as Jonas, a Magistratus of the Order and Gabrielle's mentor
- Devery Jacobs as Lilith Bathory, a student at Belgrave University and a member of the Knights of Saint Christopher
- Thomas Elms as Hamish Duke, a teaching assistant at Belgrave University and a member of the Knights of Saint Christopher
- Kayla Heller as Selena Durov, a Magistratus and one of the Order's most promising members
- Christian Michael Cooper as Maddox Coventry, Edward Coventry's son
- Françoise Yip as Elizabeth Kepler, member of the Order and Gnostic Council
- Jocelyn Hudon as Ruby Speers, a member of the Order and assistant to Dr. Hemmings.

=== Guest ===
- Sasha Roiz as Rogwan, Demon-Emperor
- Dylan Playfair as Clayton "Clay" Turner, a golem and Jack's former roommate
- Hiro Kanagawa as Detective Hayashi
- Ty Wood as Gregory Crain, a Neophyte of the Order and son of Margaret Crain
- Ajay Friese as Amir, one of the Neophytes of the Order
- Matt Visser as Weston Miller, one of the Neophytes of the Order
- Drew Tanner as Todd Shutner, one of the Neophytes of the Order
- Favour Onwuka as Drea Antonucci, one of the Neophytes of the Order
- Andres Collantes as Diego Nunez, a Magistratus of the Order
- Jewel Staite as Renee Marand, a necromancer and former member of the Order
  - Staite also appears as Renee Marand's unnamed sister
- Ian Tracey as Jurgen Sawyer
- Jodelle Ferland as Zecchia, the thief demon
- James Marsters as Xavier
- Ian Ziering as himself
- Jason Priestley as himself

== Episodes ==
=== Series overview ===
Season	Episodes	Originally released
1	10	March 7, 2019
2	10	June 18, 2020

=== Season 1 (2019) ===
No. overall	No. in season	Title	Directed by	Written by	Original release date
1	1	"Hell Week, Part 1"	David Von Ancken	Dennis Heaton	March 7, 2019
Vera Stone, the chancellor of Belgrave University, is arguing with a woman about the admission of Jack Morton into the university and its secret society, the Hermetic Order of the Blue Rose. She magically changes his letter of rejection to one of acceptance. While leaving for the university, he discusses with his grandfather Peter Morton how his mother Chloe Morton is dead because of his father Edward. He meets his roommate Clayton Turner. He sees a blue rose in the hands of a neighbour Weston Miller, when he asks about it they get into a fight stopped by Alyssa Drake, the university tour guide. The following day Weston is mysteriously killed. Jack is approached by Detective Hayashi and Vera, who question him. After they leave, he finds a blue rose and a letter on his bed. Upon reaching the location mentioned in the letter, he meets six other Neophytes (pledges) including Amir, Drea and Todd. Two masked people arrive and explain they have to find a coin based upon a clue within 24 hours and only three of them will be selected. Jack identifies one of them as Alyssa, she later denies it but secretly helps him by giving hints. Next day Jack attends his ethics class with professor Eric Clarke. Jack finds the coin in a hut and proceeds to the next round, while Todd is rejected and made to forget about all of it. Amir also proceeds further. Later Jack and Amir find Drea injured with wounds on her neck, and she dies after they find her. Jack follows another Order member Kyle into a house where he finds Vera using necromancy on Drea to identify her killer. Jack shares this with his grandfather who is thrilled. Jack magically receives a locket for protection, and a fake task by Kyle to dig his mother's grave which he plans to use to blackmail Jack. A large wolf-like creature attacks them at the cemetery but doesn't harm Jack and leaves.
2	2	"Hell Week, Part 2"	David Von Ancken	Shelley Eriksen	March 7, 2019
Jack escapes and finds Alyssa and Kyle in their masks. Kyle orders Alyssa to use the powder on him, which she does, but next day reveals she used a fake one. Jack discusses the events with Pete, who infers that the creature is a werewolf. Alyssa is summoned by Vera who tells her to leave the situation to experienced practitioners. Jack visits the forest where he finds the beast and follows it to the campus but is unable to find it. He warns Amir to be careful. The next day Amir is found dead. Jack discusses the situation with Randall, his resident advisor, and they decide to hunt the werewolf. Jack follows Gabrielle, another neophyte, and discovers Alyssa is also doing the same. They team up and find a mud monster attacking Gabrielle. They attempt to fight it but get overpowered; a woman's whisper is heard and the monster leaves. Vera meets with Kyle and other magistrates of the Order, and orders them to find information about the werewolf. Later she meets with Margaret Crain, the woman who disapproved of Jack's admission to Belgrave. Alyssa deduces that the mud monster is a golem, which is a being made from mud, sand or metal controlled by a magic user. Jack theorizes that Gregory Crain, another neophyte must be using the golem to get in the Order. When Jack returns to his dorm room, he finds dust all over Clay's things and infers that Clay is the golem. Clay tries to kill Jack but he deactivates him. During the pledging ceremony, Jack reveals his findings. The Grand mMagus reanimates Clay's head, which reveals it was Margaret Crain who created him to get her son Gregory into the order. They both are taken away, while Jack is pledged along with Gabrielle and Brandon. Everyone else removes their masks, and Jack identifies the Grand Magus as his father Edward, who doesn't remember him. Pete is thrilled at this finding and plans revenge on Edward for driving Chloe to suicide. Meanwhile Edward makes Clay kill Margaret. The following day, Jack follows the werewolf's footprints in the forest, where he's chased by one and he runs into an abandoned building. He locks himself into the basement where a furry creature from a box attacks and engulfs him.
3	3	"Introduction To Ethics, Part 1"	Kristin Lehman	Rachel Langer	March 7, 2019
Randall along with Hamish and Lilith, members of Knights of Saint Christopher, find a naked and unconscious Jack, and explain to him that they are werewolves, and the thing that engulfed him was Silverback, making him a werewolf too. Everytime someone uses magic, the werewolves hear a ringing, and Silverback attempts to come out. Vera casts a Respondeo incantation making everyone's memory (except the order members) change about the death of the students. Jack is tutored by Alyssa, but before she could cast a spell, he escapes in fear of transforming. Randall tells Jack that Lilith and Hamish will kill him if he doesn't swear to the Knights. Edward gives Alyssa, Kyle and two others a task - recovering what an obsidian block is hiding. Gabrielle learns a spell from her tutor Jonas, that can trick people into believing certain things. The Acolytes use the spell to buy things and hand over school assignments, without paying any price. Jack uses the spell on Pete, when he pressurizes Jack into finding evidence against Edward and the Order. He observes that people get hurt after their incantation, as every magic has a cost. Alyssa solves the task, and the block reveals pages from an old magic book. Gabrielle learns of another spell by tricking Jonas, to escape from Professor Benson's test. Jack learns that this spell could kill the professor, and goes to warn her. At her house, he hears ringing and transforms into a werewolf again. He wakes up in the forest next to the dead body of Professor Clarke, who he believes he murdered and then proceeds to bury him.
4	4	"Introduction To Ethics, Part 2"	Kristin Lehman	Jennica Harper	March 7, 2019
Alyssa resigns as Jack's tutor to assist Edward who makes her his protegè. He tells her of a special book, The Vade Maecum Infernal, the most powerful incantation ever made, which has been divided into four pieces and hidden. He brings in the body of Sir Richard De Payne, who is a carrier of a piece. Alyssa drinks Somnus Adveniat, a potion to go into his subconscious, and finds the second piece. Meanwhile Jack finds out that Professor Clarke was magically controlled to kill Professor Benson, when he transformed and killed him. Alyssa tells him that magic finds a new path when blocked, but gets weaker, so Benson only got into a car accident and didn't die. Jack and Alyssa kiss. He proposes an alliance to the Knights, they give it a trial. They train him and he gets some control over his transformations. He finds out Brandon and Gabrielle again performed a spell to never take another English exam. Several people are again magically controlled to kill Benson, but the Knights stop them and the magic eventually dies. Jack tells Vera he killed Clarke, but she doesn't punish him. He swears loyalty to the Knights.
5	5	"Homecoming, Part 1"	Leslie Hope	Jason Filiatrault	March 7, 2019
During a meeting of the elders of the Order, Edward tells the others about his plan to use the Vade Maecum Infernal, and he still has two pieces left to find. Renée, an ex-member who was kicked out of the Order along with her sister, crashes the meeting and informs Edward that she has cancer, but she can give him the Necrophone, a device that can be used to talk to dead, to help him recover the remaining pieces. She will exchange the device for the Elemental Transference, a spell which removes her cancer and divides it to five willing sacrifices. He agrees and order Vera to perform the spell. Alyssa informs Jack, who shares the information among the Knights on how to stop the transference process. Jack tries to sabotage the preparations but they still perform the spell. Now cancer-free, Renée gives the device to Alyssa and Jack, who later sleep together. Hamish and Lilith visit the sacrifices, who are terminally ill, and it is revealed that they were already dying before the spell. To complete the spell successfully, the sacrifices must die from the cancer. The werewolves kill dying patients and the Transference spell is reversed; Renée's cancer returns in a violent process and kills her.
6	6	"Homecoming, Part 2"	Leslie Hope	Penny E. Gummerson	March 7, 2019
Renée's sister finds her body, and calls Jack and Alyssa to give the Necrophone back. She kills various people and uses necromancy to kidnap Alyssa, asking for the device in return from Jack. He arrives and gives it to her. She uses it to contact her sister, who asks them to kill them all, and announces that Jack is a werewolf. Jack transforms and saves Alyssa (who becomes unconscious), steals the device, and takes her to his house. Meanwhile, Kyle finds the bodies of Jonas and the sacrifices and deduces it to be the work of werewolves. He orders Gabrielle and Brandon to find the wolf using Oculus Veritatis, a potion that allows them to see a person in their true self. Kyle finds and stabs Hamish with a magical knife, but he escapes. Randall and Lilith repair the wound using a book in their basement. To stop the Order from hunting them further, they release a wolf hide on Kyle, transforming him, and Gabrielle kills him. At his house, Jack and Pete use the Necrophone to talk to his mother Chloe, who says she's not at peace because she's not with Edward, whom she still loves. In anger, Pete destroys the device.
7	7	"Undeclared, Part 1"	Rachel Leiterman	Jennica Harper	March 7, 2019
Alyssa is angry at Jack and leaves. Pete asks Jack to leave Alyssa and the Order. She lies to Vera and Edward about Jack and is asked to bring the destroyed Necrophone to them. Vera is included in the Order Council. She expresses concern over the pursuit of The Vade Maecum by Edward. Later, they both use the truth serum, where Edward reveals that he intends to use the book for betterment of humanity and Vera gives him the third piece; it is later revealed that he lied. Meanwhile Gabrielle uses a magical artifact that burns one's soul when lied upon, to find out about other werewolves, but is stopped by Vera. Randall leaves with a girl named Ruby in the bar but gets locked up in an experimental facility where Dr. Bremmings plans to create more werewolves from him.
8	8	"Undeclared, Part 2"	Rachel Leiterman	Rachel Langer	March 7, 2019
Edward's son Maddox accidentally releases a man named Jurgen Sawyer from the pieces of the Vade Maecum, who threatens to kill him; Edward confronts him. Jurgen tells him that he needs to sacrifice his son to obtain the full power of the incantation. Edward kills him. Randall allows Dr. Bremmings to run tests on him; he puts a sigil that increases his anger inside his neck and makes him kill others and Ruby, who turned out to be his assistant. Jack brings Alyssa to the Knights' house and helps them find Randall with magic. She reveals that Lilith used to be in the Order, but was kicked out and her memory removed. They save Randall, who kills Bremmings. While in a fit of rage Randall tries to kill his friends, Jack reveals that Edward is his father, and Alyssa removes the sigil from Randall's neck. Jack drops Alyssa home and wants to stay the night, but she asks him not to as they are on opposite sides. As he leaves, he sees Edward taking Alyssa with him in his car.
9	9	"Finals, Part 1"	Mathias Herndl	Shelley Eriksen	March 7, 2019
10	10	"Finals, Part 2"	Mathias Herndl	Dennis Heaton	March 7, 2019

=== Season 2 (2020) ===
No. overall	No. in season	Title	Directed by	Written by	Original release date
11	1	"Free Radicals, Part 1"	Leslie Hope	Dennis Heaton	June 18, 2020
12	2	"Free Radicals, Part 2"	Leslie Hope	Dennis Heaton	June 18, 2020
13	3	"Fear Itself, Part 1"	Mathias Herndl	Shelley Eriksen	June 18, 2020
14	4	"Fear Itself, Part 2"	Mathias Herndl	Shelley Eriksen	June 18, 2020
15	5	"The Commons, Part 1"	Marita Grabiak	Jason Filiatrault	June 18, 2020
16	6	"The Commons, Part 2"	Marita Grabiak	Penny E. Gummerson	June 18, 2020
17	7	"Spring Outbreak, Part 1"	Mark Chow	Gorrman Lee	June 18, 2020
18	8	"Spring Outbreak, Part 2"	David Von Ancken	Story by : Kat Sieniuc; Teleplay by : Rachel Langer	June 18, 2020
19	9	"New World Order, Part 1"	Kristin Lehman	Jason Filiatrault	June 18, 2020
20	10	"New World Order, Part 2"	Kristin Lehman	Dennis Heaton & Shelley Eriksen	June 18, 2020

== Production ==
=== Development ===
On April 17, 2018, it was announced that Netflix had given the production series order for a first season consisting of ten episodes. The series was created by Dennis Heaton who will also act as writer and executive producer. Additional executive producers are set to include Shelley Eriksen (head writer), Chad Oakes, Mike Frislev and David Von Ancken. Production companies involved with the series include Nomadic Pictures Entertainment. On March 28, 2019, it was announced that the series was renewed for a second season of 10 episodes. On November 14, 2020, Netflix canceled the series after two seasons.

=== Casting ===
Alongside the initial series announcement, it was confirmed that Jake Manley, Sarah Grey, Matt Frewer, Sam Trammell, and Max Martini had been cast as series regulars.

=== Filming ===
Production for the first season began on April 18, 2018, in Vancouver, British Columbia, and concluded on July 20. Filming for the second season commenced on August 6, 2019, and ended on November 7, 2019.

The fictional Belgrave University was portrayed by various buildings of the University of British Columbia Vancouver Campus. The aerial shots of campus, however, are of Georgetown University in Washington, D.C. The Blade and Chalice bar was set in the UBC Old Auditorium building. The abandoned building housing The Order is the Riverview Hospital in Coquitlam.

== Release ==
On February 21, 2019, the official trailer for the series was released. The first season was released on Netflix on March 7, 2019. On June 15, 2020, the official trailer for the second season was released. The second season was released on the streaming platform on June 18, 2020.

== Reception ==
=== Critical response ===
The review aggregator website Rotten Tomatoes reported a 100% approval rating for the first season with an average rating of 7.5/10, based on 8 reviews. On Rotten Tomatoes, the second season has a 100% approval rating with an average rating of 7.68/10, based on 6 reviews.

=== Accolades ===
Year	Award	Category	Recipient(s)	Result	Ref.
2019	Leo Awards	Best Screenwriting in a Dramatic Series	Jennica Harper (for "Introduction To Ethics, Part Two")	Nominated	
2019	Leo Awards	Best Guest Performance by a Female in a Dramatic Series	Jewel Staite (for "Homecoming, Part Two")	Nominated	
2019	Leo Awards	Best Supporting Performance by a Male in a Dramatic Series	Matt Frewer (for "Finals, Part One")	Nominated	
2019	Leo Awards	Best Supporting Performance by a Female in a Dramatic Series	Katharine Isabelle (for "Finals, Part Two")	Nominated	
2019	Leo Awards	Best Sound in a Dramatic Series	Kirby Jinnah (for "Finals, Part Two")	Nominated	
2019	Leo Awards	Best Visual Effects in a Dramatic Series	Rob Bannister and Caleb Clark (for "Finals, Part Two")	Nominated	
