= Somebody Wrote Love =

Studio album by George Canyon
- Released: July 13, 2006
- Genre: Country
- Length: 44:56
- Label: Universal Music Canada
- Producer: George Canyon

George Canyon chronology
Home for Christmas (2005)	Somebody Wrote Love (2006)	Classics (2007)

Professional ratings
Review scores
Source	Rating
Allmusic	3.5/5 stars

Somebody Wrote Love is the fourth studio album by Canadian country music artist George Canyon. In 2007, the album won Canyon a Juno Award for Country Recording of the Year.

The track "Some People Change" was previously recorded by Kenny Chesney on his 2004 album When the Sun Goes Down, and later by Montgomery Gentry on their 2006 album Some People Change. Montgomery Gentry's version was released as a single. Additionally, "Quitters" was later recorded by Collin Raye on his 2007 EP Selected Hits, from which it was also released as a single.

== Track listing ==
1. "Time for Goodbye" (Ben Hayslip, Brandon Kinney, Jimmy Yeary) - 2:45
2. "Somebody Wrote Love" (Gregory Becker, George Canyon, Pete Sallis) - 3:39
3. "Coming from You" (Derek George, Randy Houser, John Tirro) - 3:42
4. "Your Smile" (Elliot Park) - 3:37
5. "Drinkin' Thinkin'" (Rick Bowles, Tony Martin, Tom Shapiro) - 3:21
6. "I Want You to Live" (Michael Dulaney, Robin Welty) - 4:37
7. "Happy Man" (Jamie Robinson, Gordie Sampson) - 3:02
8. "Madi's Song (The Man She Thinks I Am)" (Pat Alger, Canyon) - 4:15
9. "Ladders to Climb" (Jim Collins, Wendell Mobley, Neil Thrasher) - 3:13
10. "Some People Change" (Dulaney, Jason Sellers, Thrasher) - 4:01
11. "Quitters" (Canyon, Mobley, Thrasher) - 4:20
12. "The Hard Times" (Canyon, Dennis Matkosky) - 4:24

== Certifications ==
Region	Certification
Canada (Music Canada)	Gold
