= What the F*ck Is My Password? =

- Directed by: Steve Pink
- Screenplay by: Jeff Morris
- Story by: Jeff Morris; Steve Pink
- Produced by: Christopher Irion; Rob Hammersley; Sonya Novak; Steve Pink; Jeff Morris; Molly Conners; Amanda Bowers
- Starring: Alexander Ludwig; Poppy Liu; Ricky Staffieri; Stephen Dorff; Kate Walsh; Sarah Grey; Kal Penn; Adam Pally; Chris Redd; David Castañeda; Scott Adsit
- Production companies: Public House Pictures; Phiphen Pictures
- Country: United States
- Language: English

What the F*ck Is My Password? is an upcoming American comedy film directed, produced, and co-written by Steve Pink. It stars Alexander Ludwig, Poppy Liu, Ricky Staffieri, Stephen Dorff, Kate Walsh, Sarah Grey, Kal Penn, Adam Pally, Chris Redd, David Castañeda, and Scott Adsit.

== Cast ==
- Alexander Ludwig
- Poppy Liu
- Ricky Staffieri
- Stephen Dorff
- Kate Walsh
- Sarah Grey
- Kal Penn
- Adam Pally
- Chris Redd
- David Castañeda
- Scott Adsit
- Edy Modica

== Production ==
In July 2025, it was announced that a comedy film, written, produced, and directed by Steve Pink was in pre-production, with Alexander Ludwig, Poppy Liu, Ricky Staffieri, Stephen Dorff, Kate Walsh, and Sarah Grey joining the cast. Principal photography began on August 18, 2025, in New Jersey, with Kal Penn, Adam Pally, Chris Redd, David Castañeda, Scott Adsit, and Edy Modica joining the cast.
