= Sam Levin =

American singer-songwriter

- Birth name: Samuel Henry Levin
- Origin: New York City
- Genres: Rock, indie, pop, electronic
- Occupation: Singer-songwriter
- Instrument(s): Vocals, guitar, bass guitar, piano, keyboard, melodica, percussion, drums, saxophone
- Years active: 2012–present
- Labels: Clarence Productions, MondoTunes
- Website: thesamlevin.com

Samuel Henry Levin is an American singer-songwriter and multi-instrumentalist.

== Life and career ==
Sam writes the music and lyrics for all of her songs and is a multi-instrumentalist.

Sam has performed on many stages; from her first Open Mic when she was 7 years old, to her more recent 1 and 2-hour sets at coffee houses, community and arts festivals; and a London Open Mic Tour. She makes great use of a Boss RC-300 loop pedal, microKORG, and Teenage Engineering OP-1.

Her album, Frame of Mind, was widely and positively reviewed by magazines and music blogs in the United States, Canada, Germany and the U.K. The track, Metronome spent 15 weeks on the Digital Radio Tracker National Airplay Top 200 chart (July 15 – October 21, 2017) peaking at #97 (August 12, 2017) and it spent 30 weeks on the Digital Radio Tracker National Airplay Top 150 Independent chart (June 17, 2017 – January 6, 2018) peaking at #23 (August 12, 2017).

== Discography ==
Singles

- I Sure Hope Not (2012)
- Being With You is Easy (2013)
- Shades of Pale (2016)
- First World Problems (2018)
- Bye For Now / The Fourth One (2018)
- Bookmark (2019)
- Dairy Queen Queen (2019)
- King Size Bed (2020)

Extended plays

- I'm in Here EP (2014)

Albums

- Frame of Mind (2017)
- I Am (2018)
- A General Air of Regret (2019)
