= I Got This (album) =

Studio album by George Canyon
- Released: February 5, 2016
- Genre: Country
- Length: 43:10
- Label: ole

George Canyon chronology
Decade of Hits (2014)	I Got This (2016)

Singles from I Got This
- 1. "I Got This" Released: October 9, 2015; 2. "Daughters of the Sun" Released: March 29, 2016

I Got This is the ninth studio album by Canadian country music artist George Canyon. It was released on February 5, 2016 via Big Star Recordings. It includes the singles "I Got This" and "Daughters of the Sun".

== Track listing ==
No.	Title	Writer(s)	Length
1.	"I Got This"	Ben Hayslip, Jason Sellers, Jimmy Yeary	2:53
2.	"Daughters of the Sun"	Matt Jenkins, Jon Nite, Jimmy Robbins	3:02
3.	"The Hardest Part of Being in Love"	Christian Neander, Johnny Reid	3:47
4.	"The Way It Was"	Bart Butler, Aaron Goodvin, Jeffrey Steele	3:28
5.	"The Green Side"	Shawn Camp, Brett Jones, Phillip Lammonds	3:06
6.	"Only the Radio Knows"	Jayce Hein, Stephen Pasch, Thomas Tillman, Kim Tribble	3:54
7.	"Chasing Cars"	Nathan Connolly, Gary Lightbody, Jonny Quinn, Tom Simpson, Paul Wilson	4:29
8.	"Sesame Street"	Brandy Clark, Jenkins, Shane McAnally	3:07
9.	"Some Heroes"	Jenkins, McAnally	3:50
10.	"Lifetime"	George Canyon, Brice Long, Terry McBride	3:48
11.	"Remember Me"	G. Canyon, Tony Harrell, Reid	4:46
12.	"Footprints"	G. Canyon, Jennifer Canyon	3:00
Total length:			43:10

== Chart performance ==
=== Album ===
Chart (2016)	Peak position
Canadian Albums (Billboard)	39

=== Singles ===
Year	Single	Peak positions
Year	Single	CAN Country
2015	"I Got This"	8
2016	"Daughters of the Sun"^{A}	37

- ^{A}Current single.
