= Classics (George Canyon album) =

Studio album by George Canyon
- Released: October 9, 2007
- Genre: Country
- Length: 38:13
- Label: Universal Music Canada
- Producer: George Canyon

George Canyon chronology
Somebody Wrote Love (2006)	Classics (2007)	What I Do (2008)

Classics is the fifth studio album by Canadian country music singer George Canyon. The album is a collection of classic country songs covered by Canyon. Of the album, Canyon said:

This is the album I've always wanted to make. It was a labor of love to record these songs that influenced me so many years ago. It was important for me to keep the arrangements true to the original in the hope that when people listen to this it recreates the magic I experienced when hearing these songs on the radio the first time round.

== Track listing ==
1. "Ring of Fire" (June Carter Cash, Merle Kilgore) – 2:43
2. "Seven Spanish Angels" (Troy Seals, Eddie Setser) – 4:01
3. "Theme From 'The Dukes of Hazzard' (Good Ol' Boys)" (Waylon Jennings) – 2:37
4. "Luckenbach, Texas (Back to the Basics of Love)" (Bobby Emmons, Chips Moman) – 3:27
5. "Good Hearted Woman" (Jennings, Willie Nelson) – 3:37
6. "He Stopped Loving Her Today" (Bobby Braddock, Curly Putman) – 3:23
7. "You're My Best Friend" (Wayland Holyfield) – 2:37
8. "Kiss an Angel Good Mornin'" (Ben Peters) – 2:06
9. "Okie from Muskogee" (Roy Edward Burris, Merle Haggard) – 2:46
10. "Hello Darlin'" (Conway Twitty) – 2:28
11. "Release Me" (Eddie Miller, Dub Williams, Robert Yount) – 2:47
12. "Folsom Prison Blues" (Johnny Cash) – 2:46
13. "The Battle of New Orleans" (Jimmy Driftwood) – 2:55

== Certifications ==
Region	Certification
Canada (Music Canada)	Gold
