= Decade of Hits (George Canyon album) =

Compilation album by George Canyon
- Released: September 9, 2014
- Genre: Country
- Length: 59:22
- Label: Big Star

George Canyon chronology
Classics II (2012)	Decade of Hits (2014)	I Got This (2016)

Singles from Decade of Hits
- 1. "Slow Dance" Released: October 15, 2013; 2. "Crazy Love" Released: March 18, 2014

Decade of Hits is the first greatest hits album by Canadian country music artist George Canyon. It was released on September 9, 2014, by Big Star Recordings. The album features fifteen of Canyon's biggest singles. It also includes two new songs, "Slow Dance" and "Crazy Love", both of which were released as singles. Decade of Hits was also released on vinyl.

== Critical reception ==
Bob Mersereau of CBC.ca gave the album a favourable review, calling it "everything you want in a best-of from a favourite artist." Mersereau wrote that "for a guy who grew up small-town, and lives on an Alberta ranch now, he doesn't push the cliche cowboy lyrics like so many of his Nashville peers, who own far fewer country credentials." He described the new songs as "a couple of strong love songs that move the country star just a little out of his comfort zone."

== Track listing ==
No.	Title	Writer(s)	Length
1.	"Just Like You"	George Canyon, Gary Harrison, Richard Marx	3:06
2.	"Sunshine"	Catt Gravitt, Thom Hardwell, Gerald O'Brien	3:28
3.	"I Want You to Live"	Michael Dulaney, Robin Welty	4:33
4.	"Slow Dance"	Canyon, Steven MacDougall	4:49
5.	"Who Would You Be"	Wade Kirby, Bryan Simpson	3:03
6.	"I Believe in Angels"	Jeremy Campbell, Johnny Reid	3:39
7.	"Better Be Home Soon"	Neil Finn	4:06
8.	"Ring of Fire"	June Carter, Merle Kilgore	2:41
9.	"Crazy Love"	Canyon, MacDougall	3:35
10.	"Surrender"	Trey Bruce, Marx	3:10
11.	"Somebody Wrote Love"	Gregory Becker, Pete Sallis	3:37
12.	"I'll Never Do Better Than You"	Clint Daniels, Tony Martin	3:16
13.	"Drinkin' Thinkin'"	Rick Bowles, Martin, Tom Shapiro	3:20
14.	"My Name"	Canyon, Gordie Sampson	3:58
15.	"Let It Out"	Canyon, Reid	3:13
16.	"One Good Friend"	Jim Collins, Rivers Rutherford	2:33
17.	"Good Day to Ride"	Canyon, Dean McWhinnie	3:06
Total length:			59:22

== Chart performance ==
=== Singles ===
Year	Single	Peak chart positions	
Year	Single	CAN Country	CAN
2013	"Slow Dance"	14	76
2014	"Crazy Love"	41	—
"—" denotes releases that did not chart
