= One Good Friend =

Studio album by George Canyon
- Released: September 28, 2004
- Recorded: 2004 at Quad Recording Studios and Big One Three Productions - Nashville, TN
- Genre: Country
- Length: 34:56
- Label: Universal South
- Producer: Tony Brown; Keith Brown; Tim DuBois; Steve Mandile

George Canyon chronology
George Canyon (1999)	One Good Friend (2004)	Home for Christmas (2005)

Professional ratings
Review scores
Source	Rating
Allmusic	3/5 stars

One Good Friend is the third studio album by Canadian country music artist George Canyon. It is the first album released by Canyon since he competed on Nashville Star 2, and his first release in the United States. In 2005, the album won Canyon a Juno Award for Country Recording of the Year. The album was produced by Steve Mandile of the band Sixwire, who also wrote three of the songs on it, including a co-write with Andy Childs, another member of the band.

Fellow Canadian country musician Paul Brandt sings back-up for the track "Letting Go".

== Content ==
The album's title comes from the track on the song that was pitched to George the day before he began recording. "I immediately thought of my wife Jennifer and had to have it on the album. She is my one good friend."

The album's most well known track, "My Name" co-written by Canyon, was written from the perspective of an unborn baby. "A close friend and his wife had a miscarriage and I witnessed the pain they went through losing a baby. I wanted to write a song to help people cope with that trauma and somehow bring a positive light to the subject." The music video for that song continues the theme.

== Track listing ==
1. "Who Would You Be" (Wade Kirby, Bryant Simpson) - 3:05
2. "Unfinished" (Kelley Lovelace, Lee Thomas Miller) - 3:52
3. "Workin' on Ten" (Randall Keith Brown, Willie Mack, Steve Mandile) - 3:18
4. "My Name" (George Canyon, Gordie Sampson) - 4:01
5. "I'll Never Do Better Than You" (Clint Daniels, Tony Martin) - 3:18
6. "Hell or High Water" (Mandile, Andy Childs, Scott Parker) - 2:47
7. "Letting Go" (Canyon, Thom Shepherd) - 4:37
  - featuring Paul Brandt
8. "You're in the Right Place" (Kerry Kurt Phillips, Shane Teeters) - 3:51
9. "Bird in December" (Brown, Mack, Mandile) - 3:31
10. "One Good Friend" (Jim Collins, Rivers Rutherford) - 2:36

== Production ==
Tony Brown was the executive producer with George Canyon acting as associate producer. All tracks are produced by Tim DuBois and Steve Mandile except for "Workin' on Ten" and "Bird in December", produced by Steve Mandile and Keith Brown and "Hell or High Water", produced solely by Steve Mandile.

== Personnel ==
As listed in liner notes.

- Eddie Bayers - drums
- Paul Brandt - background vocals on "Letting Go"
- Mike Brignardello - bass guitar
- George Canyon - lead and background vocals
- Stuart Duncan - fiddle
- Paul Franklin - steel guitar, dobro, slide guitar
- Steve Gibson - acoustic guitar
- John Howard - bass guitar
- Steve Mandile - electric and acoustic guitars, keyboards, percussion, background vocals
- Brent Mason - electric guitar
- Steve Nathan - piano, keyboards, B3 organ, Wurlitzer
- Russ Pahl - steel guitar
- Michael Rhodes - bass guitar
- Chuck Tilley - drums
- Dennis Wage - keyboards
- Jonathan Yudkin - violin, cello, fiddle

== Chart performance ==
Chart (2004)	Peak position
U.S. Billboard Top Country Albums	35
U.S. Billboard Top Heatseekers	23
