= George Canyon =

Canadian country music singer

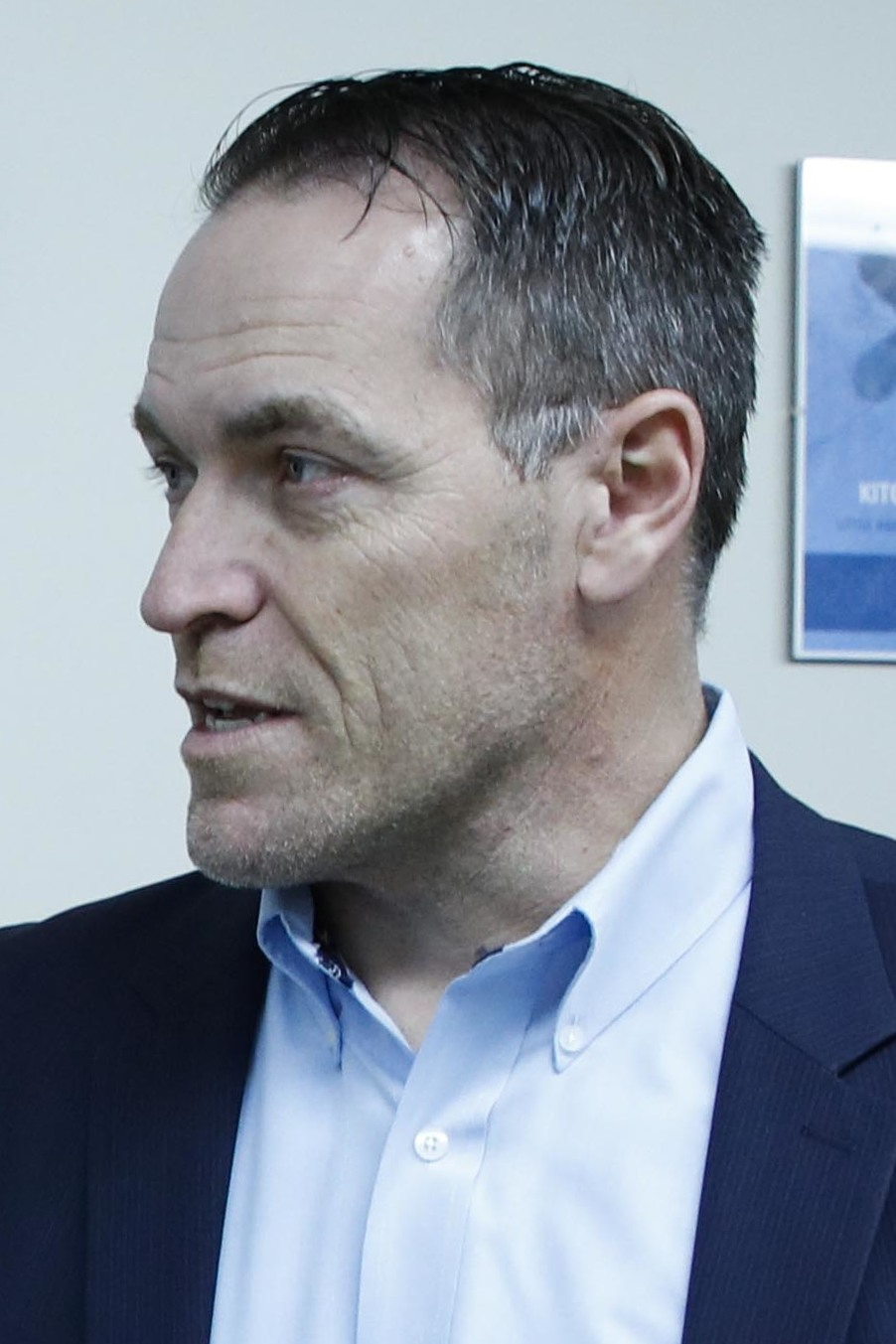

Background information
- Born: Frederick George Lays; August 22, 1970 (age 56); New Glasgow, Nova Scotia, Canada
- Origin: Pictou County, Nova Scotia, Canada
- Genres: Country
- Occupations: Singer, Guitarist
- Years active: 1996–present
- Labels: Shoreline, Universal South, Universal Music Canada
- Website: georgecanyon.com

George Canyon (born Frederick George Lays, August 22, 1970) is a Canadian country music singer. He was the runner up on the second season of Nashville Star in 2004. He grew up in Fox Brook, Pictou County, Nova Scotia before he moved west to Calgary, Alberta. He also holds an appointment in the Canadian Forces as the Colonel Commandant of the Royal Canadian Air Cadets.

== Biography ==
George Canyon has held many jobs: he spent time working as a bylaw enforcement officer/special constable, a slaughterhouse beef inspector, and the owner/operator of his own recording studio. He always dreamed of becoming a professional musician.

Canyon is the father of two children. His wife worked three jobs during the day so that he could sing at night. In 2004, George Canyon competed in Nashville Star 2. He was the runner-up in the competition, but became very well known in Canada and garnered much support, being the only Canadian to make the cut for the competition. After the competition ended, he received many accolades from fans and the industry alike. These include the top 5 hit "My Name", a Juno Award for Best Country Recording of the Year (for his album One Good Friend), and, four Canadian Country Music Awards Nominations (CCMAs) including Male Vocalist of the Year and the Fan Choice Award.

On September 22, 2007, Canyon performed at China-Canada: Hand in Hand; a joint concert held in Vancouver between CCTV (China Central Television) and CBC (Canadian Broadcasting Corporation) to commemorate the one-year countdown of the 2008 Beijing Olympics. One of the songs performed by Canyon was "What a Fine Jasmine Blossom". Sung entirely in Mandarin, Canyon performed the duet with Mandarin singer Tang Can.

On January 9, 2008, Canadian defence minister Peter MacKay appointed Canyon to the position of honorary colonel at 14 Wing Greenwood, the largest air base on the east coast. After this appointment expired in December 2011, Canyon was appointed colonel commandant of the Royal Canadian Air Cadets.

Canyon was diagnosed with type 1 diabetes at the age of 14 and has given talks to children about diabetes.

On October 16, 2014, Canyon was named the official anthem singer for the Calgary Flames of the National Hockey League.

In 2020, Canyon appeared as a panelist on Canada Reads, advocating for Jesse Thistle's memoir From the Ashes.

In 2022, Canyon published a memoir entitled My Country, in which he describes his musical career from Nova Scotia to Nashville and back.

== Acting ==
In addition to his singing career, Canyon has also performed as an actor in movies and television. His first role of note was as "Head Forest Ranger" in several episodes during the seventh season of the popular Showcase television series Trailer Park Boys in 2007. He also appeared as the character "Charlie Wells" in the series Heartland in 2008. His most notable film role to date was as the character "Cattle Jack" in the 2012 film Dawn Rider, a remake of a 1935 John Wayne film of the same name. In 2013, he had role on the movie Coming Home for Christmas and Hallmark channel's One Starry Christmas.

== Politics ==
In 2014, Canyon briefly ran for the Conservative Party of Canada nomination in the newly created riding of Bow River before withdrawing from the race later that year. On August 21, 2019, Canyon was announced as the Conservative candidate for the riding of Central Nova for the federal election later that year, where he came second to Liberal incumbent Sean Fraser.

== Band ==
- Jay Buettner (guitar)
- Michael Lent (bass)
- Adam Dowling (drums)
- Mike Little (keyboard and accordion)

=== Former Members ===
- Shane Guse (fiddle)
- Erick Hedrick (guitar)

== Awards and nominations ==
=== Juno Awards ===
Year	Category	Result
2005	Country Recording of the Year – One Good Friend	Won
2007	Country Recording of the Year – Somebody Wrote Love	Won
2009	Country Recording of the Year – What I Do	Nominated

=== Canadian Country Music Association Awards ===
Year	Category	Result
2004	Male Artist of the Year	Nominated
2004	Chevy Trucks Rising Star Award	Won
2005	Kraft Cheez Whiz Fans' Choice Award	Won
2005	Male Artist of the Year	Won
2005	Album of the Year – One Good Friend	Nominated
2005	Single of the Year – "My Name"	Won
2005	SOCAN Song of the Year – "My Name"	Won
2006	Kraft Cheez Whiz Fans' Choice Award	Nominated
2006	Male Artist of the Year	Won
2006	Single of the Year – "Somebody Wrote Love"	Won
2007	Kraft Cheez Whiz Fans' Choice Award	Nominated
2007	Male Artist of the Year	Nominated
2007	Album of the Year – Somebody Wrote Love	Nominated
2007	Single of the Year – "I Want You to Live"	Nominated
2007	CMT Video of the Year – "I Want You to Live"	Nominated
2008	Fans' Choice Award	Nominated
2008	Male Artist of the Year	Nominated
2008	CMT Video of the Year – "Ring of Fire"	Nominated
2008	Top Selling Canadian Album of the Year – Classics	Nominated
2009	Fans' Choice Award	Nominated
2009	Male Artist of the Year	Nominated
2009	Album of the Year – What I Do	Nominated
2009	Single of the Year – "Just Like You"	Nominated
2009	CMT Video of the Year – "Just Like You"	Nominated
2010	Fans' Choice Award	Nominated
2010	Male Artist of the Year	Nominated
2010	Single of the Year – "I Believe in Angels"	Nominated
2011	Fans' Choice Award	Nominated
2011	Male Artist of the Year	Nominated
2011	Album of the Year – Better Be Home Soon	Nominated
2011	CMT Video of the Year – "Better Be Home Soon"	Nominated
2013	Fans' Choice Award	Nominated
2013	Album of the Year – Classics II	Nominated
2014	Fans' Choice Award	Nominated
2016	Album of the Year – I Got This	Nominated

=== Other awards ===
- 2004 – winner, Music Industry of Nova Scotia, New Artist Recording of the Year – for the album George Canyon
- 2004 – winner, Music Industry of Nova Scotia, Country Recording of the Year – for the album George Canyon
- 2005 – winner, The East Coast Music Awards, Galaxie Rising Star
- 2005 – winner, The East Coast Music Awards, Country Recording of the Year – for the album One Good Friend
- 2005 – winner, The East Coast Music Awards, Entertainer of the Year
- 2005 – winner, Canadian Radio Music Awards, Best New Group or Solo Artist (Country) for his single Good Day To Ride
- 2005 – winner, Music Box Awards (Paris, France), New Artist Male US/Canada
- 2005 – winner, 2005 Nova Scotia Crystal Tourism Awards of Excellence, Ambassador Award
- 2006 – winner, ECMA, Entertainer of the Year
- 2007 – winner, ECMA, Entertainer of the Year
- 2007 – winner, ECMA, Country Recording of the Year
- 2007 – winner, ECMA, Video of the Year, for the video Drinkin' Thinkin'
- 2007 – nominee, ECMA, Best Album of the Year, for the album Somebody Wrote Love.
- 2008 – winner, ECMA, Entertainer of the Year
