= List of horror fiction writers =

This is a navigational list of notable writers who have published significant work in the horror fiction genre, who also have stand-alone articles on Wikipedia. All items must have a reference to demonstrate that they have produced significant work in the horror genre.

== A ==
- Ania Ahlborn
- Robert Aickman (1914–1981, England)
- Gemma Amor
- Jay Anson
- Margaret Atwood (born 1939, Canada)
- Dathan Auerbach
- Mona Awad

== B ==
- Iain Banks (1954–2013, Scotland)
- L. A. Banks
- Tracey Baptiste
- Clive Barker (born 1952, England)
- Laird Barron (born 1970, US)
- Agustina Bazterrica
- John Bellairs (1938–1991, US)
- E. F. Benson (1867–1940, England)
- Lauren Beukes
- Ambrose Bierce (1842 – c. 1914, US)
- Jerome Bixby (1923–1998, US)
- Algernon Blackwood (1869–1951, England)
- William Peter Blatty (1928–2017, US)
- Robert Bloch (1917–1994, US)
- Marjorie Bowen (1885–1952, England)
- Ray Bradbury (1920–2012, US)
- Poppy Z. Brite (born 1967, US)
- Max Brooks
- Christopher Buehlman
- Chesya Burke
- John Burke (1922–2011, England)
- A. M. Burrage (1889–1956, England)
- Octavia E. Butler

== C ==
- Rachel Caine
- Ramsey Campbell (born 1946, England)
- M. R. Carey
- E. M. Carroll
- Angela Carter
- Robert W. Chambers (1865–1933, US)
- Simon Cheshire writing as Richard Gadz (born 1964, England)
- Stephen Chbosky
- Joey Comeau
- Justin Cronin
- Nick Cutter

== D ==
- Roald Dahl (1916–1990, Wales/England)
- Mark Z. Danielewski
- Walter de la Mare (1873–1956, England)
- Joe Donnelly
- Daphne du Maurier (1907–1989, England)
- Tananarive Due (born 1966, US)
- Lois Duncan
- Katherine Dunn
- Lord Dunsany (1878–1957, England/Ireland)

== E ==
- Amelia B. Edwards (1831–1892, England)
- Bret Easton Ellis (born 1964, US)
- Harlan Ellison (1934–2018, US)
- Guy Endore (1901–1970, US)
- Mariana Enriquez

== F ==
- Gemma Files (born 1968, Canada)
- John Fowles

== G ==
- Neil Gaiman (born 1960, England)
- Charlotte Perkins Gilman (1860–1935, US)
- Christopher Golden (born 1967, US)
- William Golding
- Sara Gran
- Mira Grant (born 1978, US)

== H ==
- Elizabeth Hand
- Thomas Harris (born 1940, US)
- Zakiya Dalila Harris
- Rachel Harrison
- L. P. Hartley (1895–1972, England)
- Nathaniel Hawthorne (1804–1864, US)
- Grady Hendrix
- James Herbert (1943–2013, England)
- Thomas Olde Heuvelt
- Joe Hill
- Matt Hill
- Susan Hill
- Jennifer Hillier
- William Hope Hodgson (1877–1918, England)
- Nalo Hopkinson (born 1960, Jamaica/Canada)
- Violet Hunt (1862–1942, England)
- Andrew Michael Hurley
- Shaun Hutson (born 1958, England)

== I ==
- Junji Ito (born 1963, Japan)

== J ==
- Shirley Jackson (1916–1965, US)
- W. W. Jacobs (1863–1943, England)
- Henry James (1843–1916, US/England)
- M. R. James (1862–1936, England)
- Daisy Johnson
- Stephen Graham Jones (born 1972, US)

== K ==
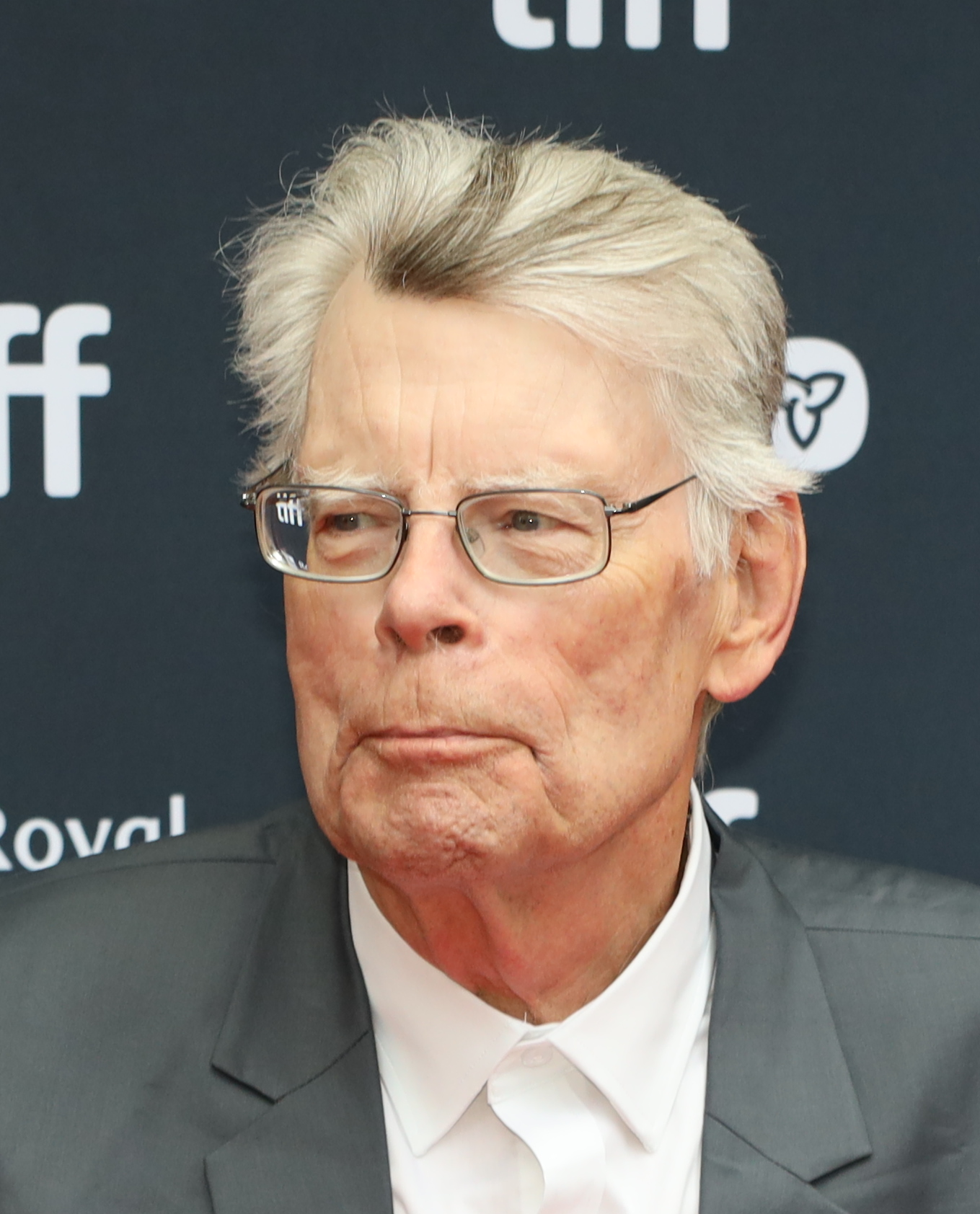
Stephen King

- Alma Katsu
- Brian Keene (born 1967, US)
- Jack Ketchum (1946–2018, US)
- Cassandra Khaw
- Caitlin R. Kiernan
- Stephen King (born 1947, US)
- Russell Kirk (1918–1994, US)
- T. E. D. Klein (born 1947, US)
- Marcus Kliewer
- Kathe Koja (born 1960, US)
- Dean R. Koontz (born 1945, US)
- Daniel Kraus
- R.F. Kuang

== L ==
- John Langan (born 1969, US)
- Richard Laymon
- Joe R. Lansdale (born 1951, US)
- Victor LaValle (born 1972, US)
- Margery Lawrence (1889–1969, England)
- Tim Lebbon (born 1969, UK)
- Vernon Lee (1856–1935, England)
- Joseph Sheridan Le Fanu (1814–1873, Ireland)
- Ira Levin (1929–2007, US)
- Matthew Lewis
- Thomas Ligotti
- John Ajvide Lindqvist (born 1968, Sweden)
- Livia Llewellyn
- H. P. Lovecraft (1890–1937, US)
- Brian Lumley (1937–2024, England)

== M ==
- Carmen Maria Machado
- Arthur Machen (1863–1947, Wales)
- Josh Malerman
- Robert Marasco
- William March
- George R. R. Martin (born 1948, US)
- Richard Matheson (1926–2013, US)
- Robert R. McCammon (born 1952, US)
- Michael McDowell
- Jennifer McMahon
- John Metcalfe (1891–1965, England/US)
- Richard Barham Middleton (1882–1911, UK)
- Sarah Monette
- Thomas F. Monteleone (born 1946, US)
- David Moody
- Silvia Moreno-Garcia (born 1981, Mexico)
- Toni Morrison (1931–2019, US)
- Ottessa Moshfegh
- Ryu Murakami

== N ==
- Adam Nevill (born 1969, England)

== O ==
- Joyce Carol Oates (born 1938, US)
- Ellen Oh
- Oliver Onions (1873–1961, England)
- Helen Oyeyemi
- Nuzo Onoh (born 1962)

== P ==
- Chuck Palahniuk (born 1962, US)
- Michelle Paver
- Tom Piccirilli
- Edgar Allan Poe (1809–1849, US)
- Laura Purcell

== R ==
- Ava Reid
- Anne Rice (1941–2021, US)
- Bertram Fletcher Robinson
- Christina Georgina Rossetti

== S ==
Mary Shelley

- Riley Sager
- Joan Samson (1937–1976)
- Rod Serling (1924–1975, US)
- Mary Shelley (1797–1851, England)
- Lionel Shriver
- Anne Rivers Siddons (1936–2019, US)
- Dan Simmons (1948–2026, US)
- May Sinclair (1863–1946, England)
- Jonathan Sims
- Scott Smith
- Clark Ashton Smith (1893–1961, US)
- Simone St. James
- R. L. Stine (born 1943, US)
- Bram Stoker (1847–1912, Ireland/England)
- Dacre Stoker
- Mats Strandberg
- Peter Straub (1943–2022, US)
- Whitley Strieber (born 1945, US)
- Charles Stross
- Koji Suzuki (1957–2026, Japan)
- Søren Sveistrup

== T ==
- Sonya Taaffe
- Michael Talbot
- James Tiptree Jr. (pseudonym of Alice Bradley Sheldon)
- Paul Tremblay
- Thomas Tryon

== W ==
- H. Russell Wakefield (1888–1964, England)
- Sarai Walker
- Catriona Ward
- Sarah Waters
- Edith Wharton (1862–1937, US)
- Oscar Wilde
- F. Paul Wilson (born 1946, US)
- Kai Ashante Wilson
- David Wong (pseudonym of Jason Pargin)
- John Wyndham

== Y ==
- Chelsea Quinn Yarbro

== Z ==
- Roger Zelazny (1937-1995, US)

== See also ==
- Lists of writers
  - List of fantasy authors
  - List of notable 20th-century writers
  - List of science fiction authors
