= MHE =

MHE may refer to:

- Hereditary multiple exostoses (HME) (also termed Multiple hereditary exostoses [MHE], Multiple Osteochondroma [MO])
- Material-handling equipment
- Moving Horizon Estimation
- MHE, abbreviation of _9MOTHER9HORSE9EYES9, anonymous writer
- Mitchell Municipal Airport, Mitchell, South Dakota, US, by IATA and FAA LID
