= Walter Brandorff =

German-Austrian author

Walter Brandorff (born 1943 in Munich, Germany; died 8 August 1996, in Carinthia, Austria) was a German–Austrian author.

== Biography ==
Born in Munich, Brandorff—who led a quite solitary live, and whose biography lies in the dark to a wide extent—spent the largest part of his life in the Austrian state of Carinthia. Until his retirement in 1991, he worked as a court secretary and held the title of Wirklicher Hofrat.

Three novels and two volumes containing smaller stories by Brandorff—until then released by himself through self-publishing—have been brought out in the years 1989–1996. In these works—which are each considered outstanding among appreciators—Brandorff combined elements of splatter and erotic with the narrative structure of classical horror literature.

On 8 August 1996 Brandorff was killed in a helicopter accident near his residence in Carinthia. His books have meanwhile been re-issued by the German publishing house Verlag Lindenstruth.

== Bibliography ==
- The House by the Lake. An Uncanny Novel
- I Will Eat Your Heart. 7 Evil Tales
- The Year of Horror. Satan in St. Judas. A Calendar Tale
- The Dead are Alive and Other Evil Tales
- Quinter's Last Winter. A Horror Novel

== See also ==
- List of horror fiction authors
