= Calling Darkness =

Horror podcast

Presentation
- Hosted by: Libsyn
- Starring: S.H.Cooper; Gemma Amor; Victoria Juan; Allison Brandt; Desdymona Howard; Charlotte Norup
- Genre: Horror comedy
- Format: Audio podcast
- Written by: S.H.Cooper and Gemma Amor
- Narrated by: Kate Siegel
- Language: English
- Length: 25–55 minutes

Production
- Theme music composed by: Brandon Boone
- No. of seasons: 2
- No. of episodes: 11

Publication
- Original release: February 14, 2019 – July 13, 2023
- Provider: Realm Media; Audio Drama Queens

Related
- Related shows: The NoSleep Podcast
- Website: callingdarknesspodcast.libsyn.com

Calling Darkness is a horror comedy podcast written by Gemma Amor and S.H.Cooper. It was co-created by S.H.Cooper, Gemma Amor, Victoria Juan, Allison Brandt, Desdymona Howard, and Charlotte Norup who each play characters in an ensemble cast. Kate Siegel narrated the first season. The first season was released in 2019 and the second season in 2023.

== Premise ==
Four women go to Crowe House, an isolated manor, for acting lessons from Annabelle Crowe. They are joined by Annabelle's visiting cousin, Nadia. The group read a book which accidentally summons a demon. They try to escape Crowe House and defeat the demon with help from a priest and his friend.

== Cast ==
- Kate Siegel as the narrator
- S.H.Cooper as Bridgette Milsen
- Gemma Amor as Gloria Smith
- Victoria Juan as Mariela Williams
- Allison Brandt as Cassie Waters
- Desdymona Howard as Annabelle Crowe
- Charlotte Norup as Nadia Olsen
- Erin B Lillis as Mrs. Morwood
- David Cummings as Mr. Morwood
- Dan Zappulla as Phineas Daws
- Owen McCuen as Father Montgomery
- Graham Rowat as the demon

== List of episodes ==
=== Season 1 ===
No. overall	No. in season	Title	Written by	Original release date
1	1	"Class Is In"	S.H.Cooper	February 14, 2019
2	2	"A Sticky Situation"	S.H.Cooper	February 28, 2019
3	3	"Bathtime"	Gemma Amor	March 14, 2019
4	4	"Someone At The Door"	Gemma Amor	March 28, 2019
5	5	"Women In The Wallpaper"	S.H.Cooper	April 11, 2019
6	6	"Cheek To Cheek"	Gemma Amor	April 27, 2019
7	7	"Digging Up The Past"	S.H.Cooper	May 23, 2019
8	8	"It's All Going To Hell"	S.H.Cooper	June 13, 2019
9	9	"Betrayal"	Gemma Amor	June 27, 2019
10	10	"Burning Down The House"	Gemma Amor and S.H.Cooper	July 11, 2019

=== Season 2 ===
No. overall	No. in season	Title	Written by	Original release date
11	1	"We're Not In Crowe House Anymore"	S.H.Cooper	March 23, 2023
12	2	"I Hear Dead People"	S.H.Cooper	March 30, 2023
13	3	"Where All Hope Comes to Die"	S.H.Cooper	April 13, 2023
14	4	"It Might Be His World, But We're Living In It, Baby"	S.H.Cooper	May 4, 2023
15	5	"Bovine Intervention"	S.H.Cooper	May 22, 2023
16	6	"Something Is Rotten In Denmark"	S.H.Cooper	June 1, 2023
17	7	"Pretty Flies For A White Guy"	S.H.Cooper	June 15, 2023
18	8–1	"Rebuild The Beginning"	S.H.Cooper	June 29, 2023
19	8–2	"To Get To The End"	S.H.Cooper	July 13, 2023

== Development ==
The concept was developed by Gemma Amor, Allison Brandt, S.H.Cooper, Desdymona Howard, Victoria Juan, and Charlotte Norup who wanted to get into voice acting. Amor and Cooper decided to write the show while all six would feature as actors. Both writers had contributed to The NoSleep Podcast and approached David Cummings for advice on how to produce the show. Cummings became an Executive Producer, and helped involve Kate Siegel. Teaser episodes were released in 2018 and the first season followed 2019; Amor and Cooper had planned to write and release the second season in 2020, but it was delayed by the COVID-19 pandemic.

== Reception ==
By October 2020, the podcast had reached 200,000 downloads. Writing for The A.V. Club, Elena Fernández-Collins observed that the show's "sharp, integral focus on character relationships, mostly in the ways that they hate each other, that allows for humorous moments even when someone is being dragged to their doom". Writing about the first episode, Crescenda Long also praised the dark humour. A review by Elle Turpitt in Divination Hollow – which publishes reviews of horror, sci-fi, and fantasy – was positive about the podcast and highlighted the balance of the ensemble cast and the characters' development.

== Awards ==
Year	Award	Nominee/Role	Category	Result	Ref.
2019	AudioVerse Awards	Allison Brandt as Cassie Waters	Performance of a Role in an Ensemble Cast for a New Audio Play Production	Won	
