= The Third Parent =

Upcoming film directed by David Michaels

- Directed by: David Michaels
- Written by: David Michaels
- Based on: "The Third Parent" by Elias Witherow
- Produced by: Jonathan Halperyn; Daniel Kresmery; Gary Michael Walters; Spencer Young; Rob Lowe
- Starring: Rob Lowe; Crispin Glover; Roselyn Sánchez
- Cinematography: Tim Maurice-Jones
- Edited by: Jérôme Eltabet
- Music by: Andy Jenks; Butch Vig
- Production companies: Walters Media Group; Enfant Terrible Cinema
- Distributed by: Bleecker Street
- Release date: January 22, 2027
- Country: United States
- Language: English

The Third Parent is an upcoming American supernatural horror film directed and written by David Michaels. It is based on the Creepypasta story of the same name. The film stars Rob Lowe and Roselyn Sánchez as a married couple whose family home is taken over by a humanoid entity known as Tommy Taffy, played by Crispin Glover.

The Third Parent is scheduled to be released in the United States by Bleecker Street.

== Premise ==
Amidst a Fourth of July celebration a disturbing figure named Tommy Taffy emerges and imposes authoritarian rule over an unsuspecting family.

== Cast ==
- Rob Lowe as Cap Hollow
- Crispin Glover as Tommy Taffy
- Roselyn Sánchez as Megan Hollow
- Rafael de Belligny as Matt Hollow
- Bethany Milner as Stephanie Hollow

== Production ==
"The Third Parent" is a short creepypasta horror story written by Elias Witherow and published on the r/nosleep subreddit. In February 2025, it was announced that a film adaptation of the story was in development. The following month, Rob Lowe, Roselyn Sánchez, and Crispin Glover were cast, with Bleecker Street acquiring the North American distribution rights. After filming was complete, HanWay Films was announced to be selling international distribution rights for the film at the 2025 Cannes Film Festival.

== Release ==
The Third Parent is scheduled to release in the United States on January 22, 2027. It was originally scheduled to be released on August 7, 2026.
