= R/nosleep =

Subreddit dedicated to user-generated horror stories

r/nosleep
- Subreddit icon
- Website type: Subreddit
- Founded: March 24, 2010; 16 years ago
- Website: www.reddit.com/r/nosleep/

r/nosleep is a subreddit dedicated to user-generated short horror stories. Rules of the community include that stories posted on the subreddit must be believable and that users must pretend that the stories are true. It has over 18 million members and is within the top fifty most popular subreddits. It has spawned an eponymous podcast called The NoSleep Podcast and multiple published novels, as well as film and television adaptations.

== History ==
r/nosleep was created on March 24, 2010. According to the rules of the subreddit, members must pretend that all stories are true in comments.

r/nosleep has faced problems with copyright violations on the internet, particularly people who upload narrations of short stories without crediting or requesting permission from the original author. Moderators have created three other subreddits – r/NosleepWritersGuild, r/SleeplessWatchdogs, and r/YTNarratorsGuild – to educate narrators on copyright law and how to use content from r/nosleep as well as to report copyright violations on the internet and alert affected authors. In February 2020, r/nosleep began a weeklong blackout that restricted access to the subreddit in protest of copyright violations.

== Impact ==
In 2014, a story about a mysterious, fictitious epidemic in the small American town of Mammoth, Arizona, was published on r/nosleep. As the story spread online, many people began to believe that the story was true. Residents and the police department of Mammoth were bombarded with calls from people who believed the story, and multiple news outlets compared the incident to the hysteria which followed after listeners were convinced that a 1938 War of the Worlds radio broadcast was true. In 2017, researchers from the Massachusetts Institute of Technology's Media Lab created Shelley, a deep-learning artificial intelligence trained from a corpus of thousands of r/nosleep stories which creates its own horror stories.

=== Adaptations ===
Authors on r/nosleep have adapted their stories into published novels, such as Dathan Auerbach's Penpal (2012), which he originally published on the subreddit in September 2011. In 2016, Amblin Partners acquired the rights to "The Spire In The Woods", a ten-part story posted on the subreddit. In 2018, Ryan Reynolds was attached as a producer to an adaptation of an r/nosleep story. In 2020, Netflix purchased the rights to Matt Query's six-part series "My Wife and I Bought a Ranch." Also in 2020, Amazon Studios secured the rights to The Left Right Game, another r/nosleep story. Jack Anderson will be writing the series and also serving as executive producer. In 2022, Sony's 3000 Pictures purchased the rights to Nick Moorefox's story "My Mother-in-law was poisoning me then I found out why" with Jessica Knoll attached to adapt. An anthology television series called Tales From the Void, based on stories from the subreddit, was released in 2024. The 2026 supernatural horror film The Third Parent is an adaptation of a story from r/nosleep by Elias Witherow.

Marcus Kliewer has published two novels based on his r/nosleep stories, We Used to Live Here in 2024 and The Caretaker in 2026.

== See also ==
- _9MOTHER9HORSE9EYES9 – Anonymous creepypasta writer on Reddit
- Creepypasta – Horror-related media shared around the Internet
