= We Used to Live Here =

2024 horror novel by Marcus Kliewer

- Author: Marcus Kliewer
- Language: English
- Genre: Horror
- Publisher: Emily Bestler/Atria
- Publication date: 18 Jun 2024
- Publication place: Canada
- ISBN: 9781982198787

We Used to Live Here is a 2024 horror novel, the debut novel by Marcus Kliewer. The first version of the story was serialized on Reddit before being adapted into a full-length novel.

== Plot ==
One night, a family of five appears on Eve Palmer’s doorstep. Eve and her girlfriend Charlie are house flippers who have recently purchased a home in the Pacific Northwest. The family’s father, Thomas Faust, claims that he grew up in the house. Thomas asks to take his wife Paige and children (Kai, Newton, and Jenny) on a quick tour. Eve reluctantly invites them in. Eve feels that the family is odd, but chalks this up to her own anxiety disorder.

The narrative alternates between Eve’s story and various documents which explore the “Old House” conspiracy theory. According to proponents of the conspiracy, the Old House is a portal that connects various alternate realities, and in which unwary visitors can become trapped.

As the Fausts are about to leave, seven-year-old Jenny hides in the basement, delaying their departure. Charlie arrives as the weather worsens. Eve and Charlie share an awkward dinner with the Faust family as Paige discusses Christianity and homosexuality. As snow closes the road, the Fausts are forced to spend the night.

Thomas tells Eve and Charlie about his older sister Alison. He and Alison were both traumatized by a Christian fundamentalist upbringing. When Alison was a teenager, she began to have delusions that the house was changing around her. The next morning, Eve wakes to find Charlie gone and the Fausts cooking breakfast. The Faust family has hung Charlie’s locket on the mantelpiece. Eve’s phone is missing; she and her dog Shylo leave the house to borrow a neighbor’s phone.

At the home of her neighbor Heather, Charlie answers but the call drops. Heather reminisces about babysitting Thomas when he was young. Heather tells Eve that Alison was a runaway who moved in with the Faust family, not Thomas’s sister. Alison had a psychotic episode and stabbed Thomas multiple times, believing him to be the cause of her delusions.

Eve returns home and finds the Fausts have not left yet. She goes to the attic for tire chains; while there, she sees a woman in a hospital gown. Eve falls from the attic and strikes her head. Eve sees Thomas’s teenage son Kai with her phone; they fight and Shylo bites him. Eve then finds that Kai had been holding his own phone, and is unsure if the phone has changed or if her perception of reality has been compromised. Immediately after, the room’s window changes from stained glass to clear.

The Faust family finally leaves; Charlie returns. Charlie agrees that the window has changed. The two stay in a hotel that night. At the hotel, Charlie’s phone gets a call from Eve’s missing phone. Eve answers. On the other end of the line, Charlie’s voice states the woman with Eve is an imposter. Eve notices that the woman she is with is missing a tattoo; Eve flees back to her home to rescue the real Charlie.

Back at the house, Eve finds herself locked inside, with no sign of Charlie. The woman in the hospital gown, presumably Alison, chases Eve into the basement. There, she finds that the rooms and hallways are constantly changing. Eve exits the basement, where she finds Thomas, Paige, and their children eating dinner. Thomas refers to her as his sister Emma and threatens to call the psych ward if she will not behave.

Eve sees that Paige is wearing Charlie’s locket. She takes Paige hostage with a wine corkscrew and demands to know what is happening. Paige stabs Eve with a knife. Eve kills Paige with the corkscrew and hits Thomas with a hammer. Thomas calls her “Eve” and makes several statements alluding to the supernatural Old House. Before Eve can kill him, police arrive and arrest her. "Emma" claims that her name is Eve Palmer, but officers can find no record that Eve ever existed. She is declared not guilty by reason of insanity and sent to a psychiatric ward. Thomas visits her and leaves behind Charlie’s locket.

On an Internet forum, Charlie asks for help, claiming that Eve has disappeared and all evidence of her existence has vanished.

== Style ==
According to Publishers Weekly, "Kliewer nods to the book’s origin as a series of Reddit posts by supplementing the main narrative with 'documents'..." These documents take the form of fictional transcripts from those who have experienced the Old House phenomenon, as well "internet conspiracy theories." Additionally, each interlude ends with a single word in Morse code which spells a message for the careful reader: “The old man with the scar has lived in the cabin for centuries and goes by many different names.” One document, through unconventional capitalized letters, spells out: “The old gods see all.”

== Publication history ==
The novel had a nontraditional route into publication. In its original form, the story was posted to the r/nosleep subreddit on the social media website reddit. There, it was given the 2021 Scariest Story of the Year award. After this, the film rights to an original movie starring Blake Lively were acquired by Netflix. The story was later adapted into a full-length novel published in 2024.

== Reception ==
Zoe McKenna of British Columbia Review called the novel a "thrilling experience," praising its references to Internet culture, its unreliable narrator, and its ambiguous ending. McKenna notes that the characters "fall into the footsteps of a long legacy of one-note horror leads. Fans of the genre know this story well. The foolish protagonist makes mistake after mistake, as the audience cries out in agitation." According to the review, this trope is "what the horror genre is all about." Publishers Weekly called the novel "a winner", praising Kliewer's "atmosphere and wicked sense of humor". Elyssa Everling of Library Journal gave the novel a starred review, calling it "a twisted horror novel that blurs the boundary between reality and delusions." Everling wrote that the book was a "terrifying tale for fans of Christopher Golden’s The House of Last Resort."

Kirkus Reviews called the novel "original and extremely scary", particularly praising Eve's storyline. The review felt that the conspiracy theory interludes "[feel] jarring at times, as we’re reluctantly pulled away from Eve’s gripping tale". Nonetheless, the review concluded that the novel was a "frighteningly good debut."

Kliewer won the Kobo Emerging Writer Prize for speculative fiction in 2026.

== Adaptations ==
According to Pink News, Netflix acquired film rights to the story in 2021. Blake Lively is set to star and co-produce the film. As of November 2025, there is no release date for the project.
