= Rich Middlemas =

- Born: Richard Middlemas
- Occupation: producer
- Years active: 2011-present

Richard "Rich" Middlemas is a documentary film maker.

On January 24, 2012, Middlemas was nominated for an Academy Award for the film Undefeated. Undefeated won the Oscar for Best Documentary Feature at the 84th Academy Awards.

Middlemas optioned the film rights to thriller/horror eBook PenPal in 2012.
