= Gemma Amor =

British author and voice actor

- Occupations: Author, podcaster, illustrator
- Writing career
- Period: 2018–present
- Genre: Horror fiction
- Notable work: Calling Darkness
- Website: Official website

Gemma Amor is an English author of horror fiction, podcaster, and illustrator. She has written two collections of short stories, five novels, and edited a collection of stories. Amor co-wrote Calling Darkness and has contributed to other podcasts including The NoSleep Podcast and Shadows at the Door.

== Early life ==
Amor grew up in the Norfolk Fens.

== Career ==
Amor's first experience of writing horror fiction for publication came through The NoSleep Podcast. She began listening to the show after it was mentioned on The Black Tapes and responded to a call for submissions. The first story she submitted to the show was "His Life's Work" which was released as part of season 10 in 2018. Later that year Amor released Cruel Works of Nature, a collection of short stories including some that had appeared on The NoSleep Podcast. Cruel Works of Nature was a finalist in the 2019 Indie Horror Book Awards for Best Collection.

In 2019, Amor published her debut novel, Dear Laura, and was a finalist for the Bram Stoker Awards in the category First Novel. The book was written partly as a response to works where perpetrators of violence are the protagonists; instead Dear Laura told its narrative through the central character of Laura, someone who experienced trauma at the hands of an unknown letter writer over a period of years. The story was adapted into a multi-episode arc for The NoSleep Podcast.

Amor co-created horror comedy podcast Calling Darkness with Allison Brandt, S.H. Cooper, Desdymona Howard, Victoria Juan, and Charlotte Norup. Amor and Cooper wrote the scripts for the first season which was released in 2019. Amor voiced the role of Gloria Smith in the first and second season.

In 2020, Amor, Laurel Hightower and Cynthia Pelayo edited We Are Wolves, a collection of short horror stories from authors such as S.H. Cooper, V. Castro, and Erin Al-Mehairi. The collection was released to raise funds for charities supporting survivors of abuse. In a review for Horrified Magazine, Ally Wilkes praised the collection's "quality and diversity of writing".

In 2022, Amor published the sci-fi horror novel Full Immersion with Angry Robot. The book follows the lead character, Magpie, during an experimental treatment to help with her post-partem depression. In a review for Grimdark Magazine, John Mauro praised Amor's "raw and honest description of postpartum depression". Full Immersion was shortlisted for the 2023 British Fantasy Award for Best Horror Novel (August Derleth Award). Amor edited Roots of My Fears which was published by Titan Books and was nominated for the 2025 Shirley Jackson Award for Best Edited Anthology.

== Bibliography ==
- Cruel Works of Nature (2018)
- Till the Score is Paid (2019), second edition released as These Wounds We Make
- Dear Laura (2019)
- Girl on Fire (2020)
- White Pines (2020)
- Six Rooms (2021)
- Full Immersion (2022)
- Christmas at Wheeldale Inn (2022)
- The Once Yellow House (2023)
- The Folly (2023)
- All Who Wander Are Lost: Destination Horror Stories (2024)
- Itch! (2025)
- Roots of My Fears: Terrifying Stories of Ancestral Horror (2025)
