= 9MOTHER9HORSE9EYES9 =

Anonymous creepypasta writer on Reddit

_9MOTHER9HORSE9EYES9
- Occupation: Writer
- Years active: 2016–2024
- Known for: Reddit creepypastas

_9MOTHER9HORSE9EYES9, sometimes abbreviated to 9M9H9E9 or MHE, is the screen name of an anonymous writer of creepypasta speculative fiction on Reddit.

== Work ==
From 22 April to 17 July 2016, the writer posted a science fiction horror story in short installments to apparently random Reddit discussion threads. The story was posted in segments as replies to comments in the discussion threads. The story, sometimes referred to by others as the Interface series, touches on such topics as "Vietnam, Elizabeth Bathory, the Treblinka concentration camp, humpback whales, the Manson Family and LSD", and particularly involves entities called "flesh interfaces".

== Reception ==
The story attracted media notice the day after its first parts were published. The Guardian, reporting on the story, described it as "compelling" and "gradually more beautifully and boldly written from multiple narrative perspectives". Vice mentioned the possibility of the whole thing being part of a viral marketing campaign for something unknown. The book Immersion and Participation in Punchdrunk's Theatrical Worlds praised the usage of Reddit as a means of horror, and noted how within a week of the first post, readers had already set up a wiki to document the story. An impromptu fandom collects information about the story in a subreddit and wiki.

== Identity ==
In a later deleted post, the writer described himself as a "30-something American male", and indicated a history of substance abuse. However, the post also incorporated fictional elements of the story. A BBC article also reported that the author said he is "male, in his thirties, lives in the United States, works as a freelance translator, and was once a heavy user of LSD." The author told Gizmodo that "I live in a home for men and work a little to make ends meet." Both Vice and Gizmodo have speculated that the writer of the story was Reddit user Anatta-Phi, a prolific conspiracy theorist and moderator of ShrugLifeSyndicate, a subreddit of similar themes including psychedelics, psychosis and synchronicity.

== See also ==
- r/nosleep – Subreddit
- Mandela Effect – Psychological occurrence
