= Penpal (novel) =

Horror novel

- Author: Dathan Auerbach
- Language: English
- Genre: Fiction, horror
- Published: 2012
- Publisher: 1000Vultures
- Publication place: United States
- Media type: Print, e-book
- Pages: 252 pages
- ISBN: 098554550X

Penpal (2012) is the debut novel of American author Dathan Auerbach. The horror-suspense novel is based on a series of creepypasta stories Auerbach posted to the r/nosleep forum on Reddit. The book follows the first-person narrator as he realizes he was the focus of an obsessed stalker who tracked him and his close ones throughout his childhood.

The work was first self-published in paperback on July 11, 2012, through the author's 1000Vultures imprint. The stories were adapted for The NoSleep Podcast's debut season in 2011 and narrated by Sammy Raynor.

Film rights to Penpal were optioned by producer Rich Middlemas in 2012.

== Plot ==
Penpal is told via a series of non-linear recollections by an unnamed narrator trying to make sense of mysterious events that happened to him during his childhood, the truth of which has been kept from him by his mother all his life.

In kindergarten, the narrator befriends a boy named Josh. One day, their class conducts a penpal experiment, in which the children tie self-addressed letters to balloons and send them off. As the children receive responses, their teacher tracks how far their balloons went on a state map in the classroom. While most of the children get letters back, the narrator starts to believe his balloon got lost, until he receives an envelope containing a single, poorly shot Polaroid photo. Over the school year, he receives over 50 other photographs, all without any letter. Soon after, he realizes that the pictures all contain him and his mother, which prompts her to call the police.

The narrator recalls a series of disconnected events which, while innocuous to him as a child, take on a new sinister meaning from an adult perspective: a neighborhood snow cone customer returning a dollar bill — the same one that the narrator had included in his initial penpal letter — to him; hearing strange clicking noises, which he later identifies as camera flashes, while out playing with Josh; finding a drawing depicting himself aside a much larger man in a pair of shorts he'd left by the riverside; and the presumed murder of his elderly, demented neighbor shortly after she claimed her long-dead husband had returned home and was living with her again. One incident that particularly stands out to the narrator is awakening in the woods one night and finding his way home to discover police looking for him; a letter stating his intentions to run away was placed on his bed, although his name was misspelled. Shortly after this incident, the narrator's mother discovers something in the house's crawlspace that prompts her to sell the home and move.

The narrator's cat, Boxes, later disappears, prompting the narrator and Josh to sneak back to the narrator's old house at night to look for him; there, they discover cat food and an adult man's clothing inside the crawlspace, as well as a collection of multiple Polaroids in the narrator's room. Pursued by an unseen individual, who takes his picture during the chase, Josh drops the walkie-talkie he and the narrator had been using to keep in touch; later that night, the narrator hears Boxes' meows coming from his own walkie-talkie. The two friends eventually grow distant, with Josh claiming that the narrator had left him.

Josh later attends the narrator's 12th birthday party but seems troubled; he declines the new walkie-talkies and believes he's been sleepwalking; the narrator notes that this was the last time he ever saw Josh.

Years later, the narrator – now a teenager – begins dating Josh's older sister Veronica, who is reluctant to talk about Josh. One night, while the two are on a date, Veronica is the victim of a hit-and-run in a parking lot. Although the narrator does not see the vehicle, he still suspects the driver to be the penpal. While in the hospital, Veronica admits to the narrator that Josh has been missing for years after he disappeared one night, leaving a note on his pillow saying he was running away. During Veronica's recovery in the hospital, the pair texts regularly, and their relationship intensifies, culminating in Veronica professing her love to the narrator. He later learns that Veronica has been dead for weeks and that her phone was never recovered after the narrator returned it to her following the accident.

Now an adult, the narrator confronts his long-estranged mother about these incidents. She confesses that shortly after Veronica's death, Josh's father – a construction worker – was offered cash by a man to fill a series of holes in his backyard. A month later, while landscaping the same property, Josh's father unearthed a coffin containing the bodies of Josh and a large man embracing him. Josh's father identified the man as the same individual who'd paid him to fill the holes, and realized that he had abducted Josh and arranged for them to be buried alive together; the narrator's mother confesses that Josh was wearing a set of the narrator's missing clothes. The pair agreed to keep what had happened a secret, and Josh's father set fire to the man's corpse, refusing to allow his son to rest with his abductor in death.

The narrator reconciles with his mother, thanking her for revealing what had happened. He does not know why the penpal kidnapped Josh instead of him, but reasons that when the man couldn't follow through with his plan to kidnap the narrator, he instead focused his attention on Josh, as the two friends looked very much alike. Suffering from survivor's guilt, the narrator wishes he had never met Josh, and admits that he does not believe in an afterlife, and therefore does not think the penpal will ever face punishment for his crimes. The narrator concludes by saying he loves Josh and cherishes all of their childhood memories.

== Background ==
External audio
- Penpal I, The NoSleep Podcast (October 26, 2011), retrieved 10 November 2019
- Penpal II, The NoSleep Podcast (December 17, 2011), retrieved 10 November 2019

The storyline for Penpal is based on a series of stories that Auerbach posted to the subreddit "No Sleep" under the username 1000Vultures. Auerbach posted the first story, "Footsteps", to r/nosleep in September 2011, where it received a large positive response. He had initially meant for "Footsteps" to be a standalone story, but Auerbach chose to continue writing more stories following the same protagonist due to reader demand. Each story was narrated by the same protagonist and each one opened with the same format, where the protagonist responded to a question posted by one of the readers. During this time Auerbach also responded to user posts while in character as the protagonist. Auerbach continued to post more stories and eventually chose to expand the Reddit stories into a full-length novel.

To finance the book's publication, Auerbach chose to raise funds via a Kickstarter campaign, which raised $15,946. He then published the book under his own imprint, 1000Vultures, after his Reddit username.

In an interview, Auerbach explained how he came up with the original idea for the short story "Footsteps" (which would later be turned into the full novel Penpal), stating that it came from a childhood memory:

"My mom denies that this ever happened, but as a kid I distinctly remember waking up on my porch outside, cold and in my underwear. My mom insists that it couldn't have possibly happened, so I guess I'll never know. But I've carried that memory around for years."

Auerbach also explained how the fear of someone scooping him up in broad daylight and taking him away from his parents was always a prominent worry he had growing up, and one that would constantly manifest itself in his nightmares. He described how these experiences, mixed with the idea that "people can't perfectly remember everything from their childhood", served as "the impetus for 'Footsteps'." From here, his stories were woven together, creating a main character thrust into the very situations that the author feared himself.

== Reception ==
SF Signal rated Penpal at four stars and wrote "Auerbach took something with childish innocence and twisted into a haunting tale of obsession. I look forward watching Auerbach improve with future works that are bound to give me nightmares."

The novel was greatly received by critics as well as fans. Because so many people had followed the individually released stories that Penpal contains for so long on creepypasta.com, Auerbach was able to open a Kickstarter to raise money to get the book independently published. Auerbach explains in an interview held by Horrornovelreviews.com that the reason he believes his novel was so well-received from horror fans was because the idea of a stalker hunting you down is such a raw and human fear. Because there is nothing supernatural or fantastical about the situation, it becomes very real and readers are able to sympathize with the main character that much more. He states that "If the initial success of 'Footsteps' had gone unnoticed, I probably would not have continued writing the rest of the stories to continue it."
