= The NoSleep Podcast =

Horror podcast

- Genre: Horror; Paranormal; Short Stories; Horror podcast
- Language: English

Cast and voices
- Hosted by: David Cummings

Production
- Production: David Cummings (Showrunner); Jeff Clement (Producer); Jesse Cornett (Producer); Phil Michalski (Producer); Brandon Boone (Composer); Oli A. White (Creative Content Manager); Ashley McAnelly (Editor); Morgan Wilson (Editor)

Publication
- Original release: June 13, 2011
- Updates: Weekly

Related
- Website: thenosleeppodcast.com

The NoSleep Podcast is an anthology horror fiction podcast hosted by David Cummings. It originally released on June 13, 2011 and updates on a weekly basis.

== History overview ==
NoSleep began as a subreddit, or forum, on Reddit where people can post fictional scary stories, while others can join in to the experience, by pretending they have happened, or are happening, to their creator. With the popularity of NoSleep, a member named Matt Hansen proposed the idea of creating a podcast where the top stories from the NoSleep subreddit would be narrated in an audiobook style. The idea was well received and a few months later a small group of members released the first episode of The NoSleep Podcast. During their first two seasons, David Cummings assumed the role of host and producer, working with volunteer Redditors to help narrate and produce content for the show.

The popularity of The NoSleep Podcast rapidly grew as the production quality became more professional. Regular voices on the show who provide narration for its stories include David Cummings, Jessica McEvoy, Peter Lewis, Nikolle Doolin, Nichole Goodnight, David Ault, Jeff Clement, Erika Sanderson, Addison Peacock, Mike DelGaudio, Atticus Jackson, Dan Zappulla, James Cleveland, Elie Hirschman, Kyle Akers, Alexis Bristowe, Wafiyyah White, Jesse Cornett, Mick Wingert, and Erin Lillis. Despite horror arguably being a traditionally male-dominated genre, many of the narrators and authors of stories featured on the show, and also half of its 2 million regular monthly listeners are female.

Self-taught composer Brandon Boone, who joined The NoSleep Podcast in 2013, became responsible for the majority of the show's music by Season 5. The NoSleep Podcast theme was written by David Cummings and has evolved with each season of the show. The show also works with a number of artists to create original illustrations for each episode. New episodes typically air every Sunday and contain five or six stories per episode, not including bonus releases. Every year the show also produces a new collection of the flash stories in their "Suddenly Shocking" series and a retro radio drama series, "Old Time Radio". In 2015, the podcast was downloaded 600,000 times.

The NoSleep Podcast has also featured stories from authors who have gone on to publish their works, including the "Penpal" series from Dathan Auerbach, "99 Brief Scenes from the End of the World" by T.W. Grim, "What Happens When the Stars Go Out" by Jesse Clark, and "Psychosis" by Matt Dymerski. The NoSleep Podcast is also one of the few podcasts in its genre that pays its creative contributors.

Special guests that have appeared on the podcast include Mike Flanagan, Kate Siegel, Samantha Sloyan, Elijah Wood, and Kurtis Conner.

== Season Pass program ==
The NoSleep Podcast began as a volunteer endeavor, with all expenses being paid for out of pocket by its core team. As the quality of the show increased, expanding from a 30-minute format to over two hours per episode, the show announced that it had become unsustainable without outside funding. Just before the release of its 3rd Season The NoSleep Podcast unveiled the Season Pass Program, whereby listeners pay a one-time subscription fee each season to have access to 25 full length episodes, in addition to a selection of subscriber-exclusive bonus episodes. This is unique in that fans of the show (referred to as the "Sleepless") who are not a part of the program still receive free access to shorter versions of each episode, generally consisting of the first one or two stories, as they're released. The Season Pass Program has been successful in not only sustaining the show, but also in allowing David Cummings to focus full-time on production. It also allowed the show to expand releases to a weekly schedule.

Seasons of the NoSleep Podcast contain at least 25 episodes which each run for approximately one hour. Season Pass membership includes bonus stories in each episode, increasing each episode's typical length to over two hours. As a bonus, Season Pass members are also awarded three additional episodes throughout the season. The NoSleep Podcast is supported by most podcast apps available for iPhone, Android, iOS, and Windows. The season pass is also available to stream from most podcast apps, though it is slightly more limited (Spotify currently does not support the NoSleep Podcast's season pass).

== Episodes ==
=== Season 1 ===
Season & Episode	Story #	Story	Author	Summary	Voice actor(s)	Producer	Release date
S01E01	1	"The Stairs and the Doorway"	Eric Dodd	A night watchman at a college discovers something horrifying in the basement of the campus science building.	David Cummings	David Cummings	June 13, 2011
S01E01	2	"The Midnight Man"	V. Rusanovsky	A man who doubts the existence of an elusive creature known as "The Midnight Man" learns that it's more real than he originally thought.	Alex Beal	David Cummings	June 13, 2011
S01E02	1	"My First House"	Author Unknown	A man inherits an abandoned house from his grandparents, learning soon afterwards the terrifying reason they left it.	David Cummings	David Cummings	June 26, 2011
S01E02	2	"By the Light of the Firefly"	Luke Weller	A young boy follows a firefly into the woods late one night and finds himself lost in a strange area of the forest.	David Cummings	David Cummings	June 26, 2011
S01E02	3	"I Still Don't Know What to Think"	Jason Baird	A strange late-night occurrence involving her disabled stepfather leaves a girl unsure what to make of the whole incident.	Allison Stein	David Cummings	June 26, 2011
S01E02	4	"The Basement"	Matt Dymerski	A young man receives an unwelcome visit from a mysterious stranger while home alone.	David Cummings	David Cummings	June 26, 2011
S01E03	1	"Don't Ever Turn it Off"	Jimmy C. Broadhead, Jr.	A couple moves into an apartment building with a strange feature built into the wall of the basement: a faucet that never seems to run out of water.	Alex Beal	David Cummings	October 7, 2011
S01E03	2	"The Cornfield"	Karina Young	Two girls dare each other to enter a corn field in the middle of the night, but things quickly go awry.	Jinny Sanders	David Cummings	October 7, 2011
S01E03	3	"The Thing in the Fields"	Joseph Baker	A man finally decides to put an end to a horrifying creature that has been terrorizing him his entire life.	David Cummings	David Cummings	October 7, 2011
S01E04	1	"Jack's Back"	Linda Groth	A man thinks something is wrong with his landlord after strange occurrences begin to happen late at night.	David Cummings	David Cummings	October 7, 2011
S01E04	2	"This is My House"	Erika Blair	A young woman complains about the specter of a girl that seems to haunt her house, but everything is not as it appears to be.	Isla Schanuel	David Cummings	October 7, 2011
S01E04	3	"There's Something Wrong"	Joshua Giles	A woman wakes up in the early hours of the morning after a wild house party to discover that she's not alone.	Wade Thorson	David Cummings	October 7, 2011
S01E04	4	"Stinson Beach"	Walter Smith	Increasingly bizarre and horrific events begin happening to two friends after they find and watch a disturbing video tape.	David Cummings	David Cummings	October 7, 2011
S01 Bonus Episode 01	1	"Butcherface"	A.J. Garlisi	Two friends set out to find the reason behind the creation of a set of disturbing tapes involving a man committing horrendous acts of violence.	David Cummings	David Cummings	January 8, 2011
S01E05	1	"Tales of a New York Subway"	Colin Thomson	A young woman boards a subway to take a late-night ride home, but is disturbed by her fellow passengers... especially a man who keeps coming closer to her.	Jinny Sanders	David Cummings	October 8, 2011
S01E05	2	"A Game of Flashlight Tag"	William Dalphin	A man recalls the chilling events that transpired one fateful night of his youth when the children of his neighborhood all got together to play.	Drew Cummings	David Cummings	October 8, 2011
S01E05	3	"I Couldn't Resist You"	Chris Coffman	A chance encounter between a man and a young woman quickly spirals into something dangerous.	David Cummings	David Cummings	October 8, 2011
S01E05	4	"Safe"	Makana McDonald	A man home alone thinks he is safe from a strange woman outside his apartment window... a claim which is quickly proven false.	Matt Hansen	David Cummings	October 8, 2011
S01E05	5	"The Smell of Gasoline"	Chris Holland	A firefighter is haunted by his failure to save a young woman from a burning car.	Chris Holland	David Cummings	October 8, 2011
S01E06	1	"Kenneth"	Huxley Adams	A clerk at a photo development center recalls his most mysterious and sinister customer.	Christopher Maust	David Cummings	August 21, 2011
S01E06	2	"First Time at the Movies"	Kaye Hazelton	A woman remembers a disturbing event that occurred the first time her mother let her and a friend go to the movies alone.	Wendy Corrigan	David Cummings	August 21, 2011
S01E06	3	"Why I Refuse to Work Late"	William Dalphin	A website developer explains the reason why he quit his job at a dilapidated office building.	Reece Selby	David Cummings	August 21, 2011
S01E06	4	"Daddy, Are You Awake?"	Scott Weaver	A man wakes up one night to see a dark figure standing in the hallway, staring into his daughter's room...	Chris Holland	David Cummings	August 21, 2011
S01E06	5	"The Friendly Man"	Pit Pastel	A woman is stalked by a disfigured creature after a cryptic conversation with her insane, emotionally broken neighbor.	Wade Thorson	David Cummings	August 21, 2011
S01E07	1	"Cologne"	Allie Brosh	A paranoid woman checks everywhere in her house for intruders before going to bed every night... except for one very crucial place.	Faith Sayers	David Cummings	April 9, 2011
S01E07	2	"Never Talk to Strangers"	Isaac Faraday	A college student strikes up a conversation with a strange old man he sees sitting on a bench every day.	James Lewis	David Cummings	April 9, 2011
S01E07	3	"We Don't Talk About Sarah"	William Dalphin	A woman recalls her sister Sarah's strange behavior while they were growing up and her mysterious disappearance.	Wendy Corrigan	David Cummings	April 9, 2011
S01E07	4	"They're Not Smiling"	Vittorio Romeo	A man reveals his strange ability: every inanimate object with a face (paintings, photos, stuffed animals) smiles at him.	Chris Holland	David Cummings	April 9, 2011
S01E07	5	"Silly Boy"	Nicole Garrison	An aunt is disturbed by her nephew's description of his imaginary friend.	Jinny Sanders	David Cummings	April 9, 2011
S01E07	6	"She Found Her Way Into My Home"	William Dalphin	A father sees a strange, silent woman standing outside his apartment building one day... and then begins seeing her in his daughter's room every night...	David Cummings	David Cummings	April 9, 2011
S01E08	1	"The Woods"	Kyle Thomas	A night with the in-laws quickly spirals into horror for a man and his wife.	David Cummings	David Cummings	September 18, 2011
S01E08	2	"Can You Hear the Birds Singing?"	Douglas Bramlett	A father recalls the life of hardship and toil that he's shared with his young daughter.	David Cummings	David Cummings	September 18, 2011
S01E08	3	"Laurel Highlands"	Bill Penfield	A man hiking through the Laurel Highlands region of Pennsylvania is stalked by a mysterious woman who appears in his campsite every night.	David Cummings	David Cummings	September 18, 2011
S01E09	1	"A Dream My Mother Had"	Richard Walker	A man tells of a mysterious dream his mother used to have - and the role it may have played in her untimely death.	David Cummings	David Cummings	February 10, 2011
S01E09	2	"My Best Friend's Grandmother"	Allison Stuart	A woman recalls her daily visits to her best friend's grandmother's house and the strange events that transpired after the grandmother fell mysteriously ill.	Wendy Corrigan	David Cummings	February 10, 2011
S01E09	3	"Precious Machine"	Al Bruno	A detective is called in to investigate the mysterious disappearance of the headmaster of an asylum.	David Cummings, Wendy Corrigan	David Cummings	February 10, 2011
S01E09	4	"Balloons"	Dathan Augerbauch	The first part in the famous Penpal series of stories, this tale concerns a boy partaking in a seemingly innocent kindergarten activity - and how his participation lead to him being stalked.	Sammy Raynor	David Cummings	February 10, 2011
S01E10	1	"Prank Call"	Arann Murray	A pizza deliveryman receives a call to a dilapidated, seemingly abandoned house... but it is not as empty as it seems.	Brett Seay	David Cummings	October 16, 2011
S01E10	2	"ETAOIN"	Trevor La Pay	A worker at a suicide-prevention call center starts receiving cryptic, unsettling calls from a mysterious stranger.	David Cummings	David Cummings	October 16, 2011
S01E10	3	"Boxes"	Dathan Augerbauch	Part two of the famous Penpal series concerns the boy's attempts to find his missing cat, despite the hindrances of a mysterious stalker.	Sammy Raynor	David Cummings	October 16, 2011
S01 Bonus Episode 02	1	"Penpal I"	Dathan Augerbauch	The first three parts of the famous Penpal series, "Footsteps", "Balloons", and "Boxes".	Sammy Raynor	David Cummings	October 26, 2011
S01EP11 Halloween 2011	1	"A Halloween to Remember"	James Phillips	Four young boys break into the performing arts center of their school to look for a ghost, but they soon begin to regret this decision.	David Cummings	David Cummings	October 30, 2011
S01EP11 Halloween 2011	2	"Halloween Warning"	Warren Halloran	A man's sudden dislike of Halloween is connected with a visit he got the previous year from a couple of sinister black-eyed children.	Wade Thorson	David Cummings	October 30, 2011
S01EP11 Halloween 2011	3	"Methenes Chapel"	Eric Dodd	Two friends break into an abandoned church to hunt for ghosts, but increasingly strange events make them realize who's really being hunted.	David Cummings	David Cummings	October 30, 2011
S01EP11 Halloween 2011	4	"The Crawling House on Black Pond Road"	William Dalphin	A woman's friend inherits a seemingly haunted house from his deceased aunt and asks her to spend the night with him in it - but the two come to learn that the house's sense of unease isn't caused by ghosts...	Christina Scholz	David Cummings	October 30, 2011
S01 Bonus Episode 03	1	"correspondence://"	bloodstains	Told through a series of emails, blog posts, and phone calls, this story tells the tale of a group of friends that are haunted by a demon.	Nathan McDonald, Wendy Stolyarov, David Cummings	David Cummings	October 31, 2011
S01E12	1	"The Smiling Man"	Cedric	Friends on a late-night drive have a terrifying encounter with a man that can keep up with the speed of their car on foot.	Max Glaspey	David Cummings	November 13, 2011
S01E12	2	"Angel"	Chris Coffman	A man discovers the connection between a kitten that shows up on his doorstep one night and the mysterious ghost of a young girl that haunts his house.	Jacob Comeau	David Cummings	November 13, 2011
S01E12	3	"A Horrible Game"	Leslie X.	A receptionist and her coworkers decide to conduct an experiment to prove once and for all what exactly is haunting their office building.	Christina Scholz	David Cummings	November 13, 2011
S01E12	4	"They Were Looking Back at Me"	Ben Pierce	A teenager deals with the bizarre behavior of his friend after the friend spent a night in an abandoned cabin in the woods.	Stephen Hanson	David Cummings	November 13, 2011
S01E13	1	"Holes"	Joey Brashier	A woman recalls her stays at her grandparents' house during her youth - and the holes that appeared in the walls every night.	Wade Thorson	David Cummings	November 27, 2011
S01E13	2	"We Don't Live There Anymore"	Grant Rennet	A newlywed couple reveals the reason they moved out of their new home.	Max Glaspey	David Cummings	November 27, 2011
S01E13	3	"I Saw it Coming"	Adam Kearney	A man dreams every night of a bloodsoaked man knocking on his door, begging for help - but is it really a dream?	Brett Seay	David Cummings	November 27, 2011
S01E13	4	"Button Head"	Trevor La Pay	A worker at a government facility learns the hard way that you shouldn't work late.	Max Glaspey	David Cummings	November 27, 2011
S01E14	1	"Midnight in Kentucky"	Joshua Starbringer	A young woman makes a late-night stop at a service station during a long road trip... but why are all the lights off, and where are all the people?	Isla Schanuel	David Cummings	November 12, 2011
S01E14	2	"The Sound"	April Edgreen	A man using his computer late one night realizes he is not as alone as he thinks he is.	Gil Durate	David Cummings	November 12, 2011
S01E14	3	"The Hidden Chamber"	Justin Williams	A man excavating his garden uncovers a door that leads to a mysterious room under his house.	Max Glaspey	David Cummings	November 12, 2011
S01E14	4	"Georgie's"	Christopher MacTaggart	A woman refuses to go into the abandoned bar across the street from her work despite the insistence of the building's night janitor.	Christina Scholz	David Cummings	November 12, 2011
S01 Bonus Episode 04	1	"Penpal II"	Dathan Augerbauch	The final three stories in the Penpal series, "Maps", "Screens", and "Friends".	Sammy Raynor	David Cummings	December 17, 2011
S01EP15 Christmas 2011	1	"The Winter Fire"	David Cummings	A man spending a lonely night in front of his fireplace recalls a chilling incident that happened one long-ago Christmas.	David Cummings	David Cummings	December 25, 2011
S01E16	1	"You Never Smile"	Thomas Burr	A drill sergeant at a military academy discovers the horrifying reason why one cadet didn't come down for breakfast one morning.	Max Glaspey	David Cummings, Cornelius de Groot	August 1, 2012
S01E16	2	"My Friend's Mother"	Erik Hessmann	A man recalls a chilling incident that happened one night of his youth when he took an unplanned trip to his best friend's house.	David Cummings	David Cummings, Cornelius de Groot	August 1, 2012
S01E16	3	"Strangers in a Graveyard"	Matt Dymerski	A young couple, after witnessing a killing in a graveyard late at night, find themselves running for their lives from the murderers.	Max Glaspey	David Cummings, Cornelius de Groot	August 1, 2012
S01E16	4	"A Debt for the Dead"	Douglas Bramlett	A student at medical school discovers his lab partner's strange ability: by touching a corpse, he can tell how they died.	David Cummings	David Cummings, Cornelius de Groot	August 1, 2012
S01E17	1	"Baked Beans"	Allison Stein	A college student has a late-night encounter with who he thinks to be his next-door neighbor.	Max Glaspey	David Cummings, Cornelius de Groot	January 22, 2012
S01E17	2	"The Neighbors Upstairs"	Whitley Olivier	A new mother is tormented by the loud noises and commotion made by her upstairs neighbors.	Wendy Corrigan	David Cummings, Cornelius de Groot	January 22, 2012
S01E17	3	"Grandma and Grandpa"	Alexander White	A man reads his deceased grandmother's diary and discovers the role his grandfather's ghost may have played in her death.	David Cummings	David Cummings, Cornelius de Groot	January 22, 2012
S01E17	4	"It's Locked"	Avery Nelson	A young woman who lives alone is puzzled as to why her door is always unlocked every time she comes home from work.	Corinne Sanders	David Cummings, Cornelius de Groot	January 22, 2012
S01E17	5	"The Tunnel"	Joey Murray	A man recalls a terrifying experience he had as a kid when his parents' car broke down in the middle of an abandoned train tunnel.	David Cummings	David Cummings, Cornelius de Groot	January 22, 2012
S01E18	1	"The Ice Cream Man"	Nick Thaler	A man remembers a summer of his youth when him and his friends were stalked by an ice cream truck.	Max Glaspey	David Cummings	May 2, 2012
S01E18	2	"When You Wish Upon a Star"	Anna Smith	A young girl is stalked by a terrifying ghost after yelling at a star that didn't grant her a wish.	Christina Scholz	David Cummings	May 2, 2012

=== Season 2 ===
Season & Episode	Story #	Story	Author	Summary	Voice Actor(s)	Producer	Release Date
S02E01	1	"How They Met"	Hamish McGlasson	A man who uses a wheelchair and a reckless driver share the strange story of how they met.	Jessica Prokuski	David Cummings	June 5, 2012
S02E01	2	"Outgrowing the Nightlight"	Powell Brumm	A teenager wakes up one morning to discover that his nightlight has gone missing.	Travis Newton	David Cummings	June 5, 2012
S02E01	3	"A Tale From My Grandpa"	Hunter H. Keegan	A man recounts his grandpa's time spent in a small village in the mountains of Nepal during WWII.	David Cummings	David Cummings	June 5, 2012
S02E01	4	"Hacksaw"	Daniel Brenamen	A woman working at a police station finds an old report of a serial killer who used to operate in the area.	Jessica Prokuski	David Cummings	June 5, 2012
S02E01	5	"The Man That Ate Newborns"	Al Bruno III	A man tells a cryptic story about a girl he used to date.	David Cummings	David Cummings	June 5, 2012
S02E02	1	"5.5"	Niko Kurri	In a story told in second person, you pick up a hitchhiker late at night, but when he jumps out of your car right after he gives you a strange gift, you begin to wonder what his cryptic words meant.	Chris Eddleman	David Cummings	May 20, 2012
S02E02	2	"The Curtis's Dragon"	Ariana Selbrede	A kindergarten teacher discovers a connection between a strange story one of her students wrote and the massacre of the student's abusive family.	David Cummings	David Cummings	May 20, 2012
S02E02	3	"I Want to Help Him"	Mike Morgan	A girl can't figure out what is troubling her brother.	Jessica Prokuski	David Cummings	May 20, 2012
S02E02	4	"Nine Brief Scenes From the End of the World"	T.W. Grimm	This story involves nine short, seemingly unrelated vignettes about the end of the world and its terrifying effects on the world's inhabitants. This story would later be adapted into the full-length novel, "99 Brief Scenes from The End of the World".	David Cummings	David Cummings	May 20, 2012
S02E03	1	"A Letter to My Future Self"	Rafael Marmol	A student returns home from college and discovers a time capsule he buried in the backyard when he was a kid.	Chris Eddleman	David Cummings	March 6, 2012
S02E03	2	"Grow Up"	Adam Azar	A man refuses to believe that his house is haunted despite his family's insistence that it is.	David Cummings	David Cummings	March 6, 2012
S02E03	3	"A Simple Photo"	Mark Copeland	A young woman discovers a disturbing photo taken the day after her father's death.	Jessica Prokuski	David Cummings	March 6, 2012
S02E03	4	"Rapid Eye Movements"	Seanna Hartbauer	A man recounts his sister's mysterious disappearance from a library late at night.	James Cleveland	David Cummings	March 6, 2012
S02E03	5	"The WontThinkStraight Trilogy"	Eric Ponslee	A trio of tales from author Eric Ponslee is presented, dealing with a lonely ghost, a disturbing prank show, and the murder of a mentally ill woman's husband.	David Cummings	David Cummings	March 6, 2012
S02 Bonus Episode 01 First Anniversary	1	"The Secret Ingredient"	M.F. Korn, David Mathew	A family-owned restaurant is revealed to have a macabre, decidedly non-vegan menu.	David Cummings	David Cummings	June 13, 2012
S02E04	1	"I Won't Take Care of My Sister Anymore"	Alan Edgarton	A man, tasked with taking care of his invalid sister, is puzzled as to whom could be causing a series of strange events in their isolated mansion.	David Cummings	David Cummings	June 17, 2012
S02E04	2	"Proof"	Jeremy Jojola	In this extremely short tale, a woman is left wondering what is real and what is not after an unsettling nightmare.	Jessica Prokuski	David Cummings	June 17, 2012
S02E04	3	"The Camping Trip"	Brandon Bilodeau	A man goes camping on an Indian reservation with a friend, and after being told an old legend, he begins to learn just how true it is.	Chris Eddleman	David Cummings	June 17, 2012
S02E04	4	"The Creeper in the Field"	Mike Korensky	In 1920s Massachusetts, a monster hunter is called to a massive farm to track down and kill an elusive creature that has been killing the farmer's cattle.	David Cummings	David Cummings	June 17, 2012
S02E04	5	"Hide and Seek"	Troy Lewis	A man spends the night at an isolated cabin in the mountains - but his visit is interrupted by a strange creature.	Troy Lewis	David Cummings	June 17, 2012
S02E05	1	"The Smiling Man"	L.S. Riley	A man goes out for a walk around the city late one night and encounters a man who won't stop smiling.	Michael McElroy	David Cummings	June 17, 2012
S02E05	2	"Some Things are Best Left Unsaid"	J.T. Senters	A man who used to have strange dreams as a child wonders why his mother refuses to acknowledge that they ever happened.	David Cummings	David Cummings	January 7, 2012
S02E05	3	"The Disappearance of Ashley, Kansas"	Allan Kantor	A woman shares the disturbing story of what led to the loss of an entire town's population.	Jessica Prokuski, Ian Mendez	David Cummings	January 7, 2012
S02E05	4	"Terror Haute"	William Dalphin	A real estate agent's son agrees to spend the night in a house where the previous resident died under mysterious circumstances.	Chris Eddleman	David Cummings	January 7, 2012
S02E06	1	"Eidetic Memory"	Chris Eddleman	A detective interviews a serial killer who remembers every moment of his life... even the time he was clinically dead for 23 seconds.	Chris Eddleman	David Cummings	July 15, 2012
S02E06	2	"Unknown Caller"	Seanna Hartbauer	A woman on a job hunt keeps receiving threatening phone calls from an aggressive stalker.	Jessica Prokuski, Ian Mendez	David Cummings	July 15, 2012
S02E07	1	"The Strangest Security Tape I've Ever Seen"	Phil Zona	A day shift worker at a gas station is sure that one of the night workers has been stealing gallons of oil, but the truth turns out to be much more terrifying.	David Cummings	David Cummings	July 29, 2012
S02E07	2	"Everything I Know is a Dream"	Sam Frost	A man wakes up from a coma after a terrible accident, thinking his ordeal is over... until he wakes up from the same coma the next morning, and the morning after that...	James Cleveland	David Cummings	July 29, 2012
S02E07	3	"Never, Ever Go Into the Morgue"	Kyle A. Marrotte	A teenager feels drawn to an abandoned hospital despite the terrifying things he experiences there.	David Cummings	David Cummings	July 29, 2012
S02E08	1	"The Thing in the Walls"	Jonathan Sheeran	A man must face a terrifying incident from his past after his childhood friend commits suicide.	Chris Eddleman	David Cummings	December 8, 2012
S02E08	2	"Low Hanging Clouds"	T.E. Garu	A corporate drone is suspicious of a sudden cloudburst in a sun-bleached, parched region.	David Cummings	David Cummings	December 8, 2012
S02E08	3	"My Last Night Babysitting"	Jeanna Saccomano	A college student explains the reason she refuses to babysit anymore.	Wendy Corrigan	David Cummings	December 8, 2012
S02E08	4	"The Scarecrow Corpse"	Kristopher Mallory	A medical examiner's assistant is chilled by the strange death that he and his boss are investigating.	David Cummings	David Cummings	December 8, 2012
S02E09	1	"My Ex-Girlfriend is Insane"	Ben Cross	A man's ex-girlfriend goes to extreme lengths to try and win him back after their messy breakup.	C.H. Williamson	David Cummings	August 26, 2012
S02E09	2	"I Can't Look My Brother in the Eyes Anymore"	R. Vera Cruz	A man's abusive older brother returns from the military to live in his house, bringing something terrifying along with him.	David Cummings	David Cummings	August 26, 2012
S02E09	3	"Mason"	Melissa Rosales	A young hospital patient's crush on another patient quickly turns into an obsession.	Wendy Corrigan	David Cummings	August 26, 2012
S02E09	4	"Don't Forget Your Friends"	Kevin I. Miller	A teenager goes to see a psychic after a nighttime visitor that haunted him during his youth begins visiting him again.	James Cleveland	David Cummings	August 26, 2012
S02E10	1	"The Silent"	Asher Rice	After moving into a house that once belonged to a poet, a family finds boxes and boxes of poems about a malevolent ghost that supposedly haunts the place.	Guy Lester	David Cummings	June 9, 2012
S02E10	2	"I'm Sorry, Daddy"	Hagen Loyd	A single father comes home from work late one night to find the babysitter missing and his crying son insisting that monsters came out and ate her.	C.H. Williamson	David Cummings	June 9, 2012
S02E10	3	"Talent Show"	Sam Hunt	In the distant future, a worker at a behavioral studies center learns just how far technology has advanced after a robot starts showing signs of emotion.	Wendy Corrigan, David Cummings	David Cummings	June 9, 2012
S02E10	4	"Working Late"	Leon Chan	A new employee at an old office building is warned by his coworkers to never work late - a warning that he soon regrets ignoring.	David Cummings	David Cummings	June 9, 2012
S02E10	5	"Basement Cameras"	Alan Coakley	A security guard at a psychiatric hospital hates working in the basement security room, especially after seeing strange things on the cameras late at night.	Travis Newton	David Cummings	June 9, 2012
S02E11	1	"The Machine"	Johnny Nava	After a seemingly happy inventor commits suicide, his distraught grandson searches his workshop for the reason he ended his life.	Chris Eddleman	David Cummings	September 23, 2012
S02E11	2	"I'm No Angel"	Daniel Smith	An EMT develops a chilling infatuation with a girl he saves from a vicious beating.	C.H. Williamson	David Cummings	September 23, 2012
S02E11	3	"Don't Turn off the Webcam"	0450az001	A bartender develops a relationship with a woman he meets in a bar, and they communicate via webcam - that is, until the man begins noticing a dark figure in the corner of her room every time she signs on.	David Cummings	David Cummings	September 23, 2012
S02E11	4	"The Scarecrow Game"	Rachel Martin	A woman recalls a friend she had in kindergarten and the odd game they used to play.	Stephanie Dohrs	David Cummings	September 23, 2012
S02E12	1	"Something in My Daughter's Room"	Benjamin Joseph	A man working late at night in his home office hears a strange voice cooing at his daughter through the baby monitor on his desk.	Jörn Meyer	David Cummings	July 10, 2012
S02E12	2	"Hungry Little Girl"	J.F. Kuck	Told through a series of emails, a cop recalls a horrifying encounter with a lost little girl who claimed to have eaten her entire family.	David Cummings	David Cummings	July 10, 2012
S02E12	3	"The Late Bus"	Mark Winston	A former school bus driver recalls a strange, quiet boy who used to board his bus every morning.	C.H. Williamson	David Cummings	July 10, 2012
S02E12	4	"Strigoi"	T.W. Grimm	A college student is horrified by his elderly uncle's story of the creatures that stalked him, his family, and several other families in the winter of 1921.	Kyle Akers	David Cummings	July 10, 2012
S02E12	5	"Budget Cinema"	Thomas Thompson	A horror movie aficionado gets more than he bargained for when he attends a midnight screening of a new horror movie.	David Cummings	David Cummings	July 10, 2012
S02E13	1	"5:19"	Mark Copeland	A man sees a strange sight very early one morning: an old man leading several dogs and cats that begin peering into the houses on his street.	Mark Copeland	David Cummings	October 21, 2012
S02E13	2	"Echoes"	Claverhouse	A retired serial killer is visited by the ghosts of his victims.	James Cleveland	David Cummings	October 21, 2012
S02E13	3	"Animal Control"	David Burks	An animal control officer realizes he is not as alone when he tries to release some animals into a stretch of woods near an abandoned graveyard.	David Cummings	David Cummings	October 21, 2012
S02E13	4	"Apartment 1702"	Stephen Yiu	A trio of friends head up in an elevator to explore an abandoned apartment in their building.	Chris Eddleman	David Cummings	October 21, 2012
S02E13	5	"Daddy Found a New Family"	Jeremiah Knopp	A teenager is convinced that a friendly old woman who lives in his town is responsible for the disappearance of a young boy.	David Cummings	David Cummings	October 21, 2012
Season 2 Bonus Episode 02 Halloween 2012	1	"Snapshot"	David Burks	A man notices that a family photo hanging on his wall changes every day.	James Cleveland	David Cummings	October 31, 2012
Season 2 Bonus Episode 02 Halloween 2012	2	"The Witches and the Circle"	Eric Dodd	A group of friends decide to try and summon demons one Halloween night with terrifying results.	David Cummings	David Cummings	October 31, 2012
Season 2 Bonus Episode 02 Halloween 2012	3	"Nobody"	Anders Jensen	In a story told in second person, you meet a girl at a club, who takes you to her apartment, where you pass out - and wake up in a horrifying situation.	C.H. Williamson	David Cummings	October 31, 2012
Season 2 Bonus Episode 02 Halloween 2012	4	"The Showers"	Dylan Sindelar	While in high school, a young man is enraptured by a frightening tale told by his favorite teacher on Halloween. Years later, he sets out to prove once and for all if his teacher's story was true or not.	David Cummings	David Cummings	October 31, 2012
S02E14	1	"The Oshavein"	Ross Raguth	A man, after watching a strange video on the deep web, finds himself being stalked by a mysterious creature.	Chris Eddleman	David Cummings	April 11, 2012
S02E14	2	"Spell of Success"	Sammy Raynor	A college student, jealous of his brother's artistic ability, wishes for drawing skills just as good as his - which he gets, but at a terrible price.	Sammy Raynor	David Cummings	April 11, 2012
S02E14	3	"Anna"	Stephen Porte	A young man is tormented throughout his school career by a girl named Anna who injures herself and blames the wounds on him.	C.H. Williamson	David Cummings	April 11, 2012
S02E14	4	"The Nocturnal Wanderer"	Adam Travis	A man wakes up one night to find a creature standing beside his bed that looks exactly like his young son.	David Cummings	David Cummings	April 11, 2012
S02E15	1	"Tattoo You"	Molly McDougal	A young woman, whose brother was killed in a drunk driving crash, has an unsettling encounter with a friend of her brother's who was in the car at the time.	Meghan O'Hara Murray	David Cummings	November 18, 2012
S02E15	2	"Elevator Ride"	Leon Chan	A man afraid of his own reflection gets stuck in an elevator that is full of mirrors.	Mark Copeland	David Cummings	November 18, 2012
S02E15	3	"My Friend"	Kenneth F. Field	In this short tale, a man tells a story about his friend, and the strange visitor he received in his apartment one night.	Kyle Akers	David Cummings	November 18, 2012
S02E15	4	"Flooded"	Kelsey Donald	A girl's parents buy an island with a small cottage on it, and life seems idyllic until the girl's parents start becoming neglectful and come home every night sopping wet.	Brittany Coulter	David Cummings	November 18, 2012
S02E15	5	"The Woman Holding an Orange"	Milos Bogetic	A man from a foreign country recalls a strange friend his mother had: a woman who would offer him a rotten orange while cooing in a childlike voice.	David Cummings	David Cummings	November 18, 2012
S02E16	1	"The Silent Store"	Alfred Dickinson	A man has a strange experience while going Black Friday shopping at a Best Buy.	David Cummings	David Cummings	February 12, 2012
S02E16	2	"Monster in the Forest"	A. Rice	An unemployed construction worker takes on an unusual job from an old man: digging deep holes in a thick forest to catch a monster.	David Cummings	David Cummings	February 12, 2012
S02E16	3	"She's a Keeper"	Brian Emsley	In this extremely short tale, a man describes all the parts of a girl he likes.	Evan Howard	David Cummings	February 12, 2012
S02E16	4	"Night Time Hero"	Trammel May	A man recalls the nights of his youth when his dad would come into his room and promise to keep him safe from monsters.	David Cummings	David Cummings	February 12, 2012
S02E16	5	"Restricted Caller"	J.A. Medrano	A college student receives unsettling calls from a mysterious woman who keeps telling her she needs to get out of her house.	Jessica Prokuski	David Cummings	February 12, 2012
S02E16	6	"Alan's Story"	Samuel Hayes	A nurse at a psychiatric hospital tells the tale of a patient who was arrested after he killed his brother, claiming he was an imposter who replaced him.	David Cummings	David Cummings	February 12, 2012
S02E17 Christmas 2012	1	"Chimneysweep"	Sam Hunt	A man wakes up to find himself at the mercy of a not-so-jolly Old St. Nick.	David Cummings	David Cummings	December 20, 2012
S02E17 Christmas 2012	2	"The Christmas Season"	Justin Williams	A family is haunted by the ghost of their first-born child.	David Cummings	David Cummings	December 20, 2012
S02E17 Christmas 2012	3	"Twas the Night Before Christmas"	Tee Jarvis	A man recalls a disturbing encounter he had as a child on Christmas Eve.	David Cummings	David Cummings	December 20, 2012
S02E17 Christmas 2012	4	"Mall Santa"	Sam Stark	A mall Santa's encounter with a young girl and her widowed mother has unforeseeable consequences.	David Cummings	David Cummings	December 20, 2012
S02E17 Christmas 2012	5	"The Mug"	Eric Dodd	A mysterious Christmas mug brings strange occurrences to a father and his family.	David Cummings	David Cummings	December 20, 2012
S02E18	1	"Snow"	Claverhouse	After a car crash, a man stumbles inside a snowbound house for help but is disturbed by the lack of occupants.	James Cleveland	David Cummings	January 13, 2013
S02E18	2	"Sorry, Larry"	Milos Bogetic	A man, bleeding heavily from a suicide attempt, is visited by a mysterious stranger.	Jörn Meyer	David Cummings	January 13, 2013
S02E18	3	"Plot Holes"	David Knoppel	A teenager witnesses the violent death of his friend and is shocked to see him show up, perfectly healthy, at school the next day.	David Cummings	David Cummings	January 13, 2013
S02E19	1	"Winter Memories"	Anton Scheller	As a prank, a college student abandons his friends in a mountain cabin. The prank goes horribly wrong when a snowstorm traps them in the cabin for a week with no food or water.	David Cummings	David Cummings	1/27/21012
S02E19	2	"Go Back to Sleep, Little Darling"	Thomas Thompson	A family moves into a new home, and everything goes well until the young daughter begins complaining of terrible nightmares.	Jacob Gallegos	David Cummings	1/27/21012
S02E19	3	"When Your World Falls Apart"	Anton Scheller	A mother is emotionally and psychologically destroyed by the disappearances of her two children.	David Cummings	David Cummings	1/27/21012
S02E19	4	"The Long Face"	Alex Hetherington	Told through a series of discovered emails, the lives of two people disintegrate as they become the victims of an entity known only as "The Long Face".	Chris Eddleman	David Cummings	1/27/21012
S02E19	5	"The Screaming Corpse"	Brian von Knoblauch	A man recalls working at his grandfather's cemetery and the horrifying encounter he had with a woman who was apparently buried alive.	David Cummings	David Cummings	1/27/21012
S02E20	1	"Please, Just Come Home Now"	Edwin Crowe	A college student receives a phone call from his mother, with terrible news: his father has just been arrested for murder.	Tyler Privett	David Cummings	October 2, 2013
S02E20	2	"The Only Way Out"	Anton Scheller	A man tells a social worker the chilling reason that he attempted suicide.	David Cummings	David Cummings	October 2, 2013
S02E20	3	"Scratching"	Jacob Newell	A man learns the connection between the horrifying events that occurred in his town when he was a boy and the death of a notorious pedophile many years earlier.	David Cummings	David Cummings	October 2, 2013
Season 2 Bonus Episode 03 Bedtime and Other Tales of Terror	1	"Bedtime"	Michael Whitehouse	In the first of a trio of tales from author Michael Whitehouse, a man recalls the strange creature that lived in his room when he was a child.	David Cummings	David Cummings	February 14, 2013
Season 2 Bonus Episode 03 Bedtime and Other Tales of Terror	2	"Tunnels"	Michael Whitehouse	This second in a trio of tales from author Michael Whitehouse deals with a construction worker's frustration with the fact that his building crew won't venture into a certain tunnel.	David Cummings	David Cummings	February 14, 2013
Season 2 Bonus Episode 03 Bedtime and Other Tales of Terror	3	"Forgotten Valentine"	Michael Whitehouse	The final story in Michael Whitehouse's trilogy episode; a man visits a graveyard and stumbles across the grave of a girl whom he had a crush on during high school.	Michael Whitehouse	David Cummings	February 14, 2013
S02E21	1	"Say's Who?"	anonymous	Two young brothers fail to heed their father's warning about venturing out into the fields late at night.	Tyler Privett	David Cummings	February 24, 2013
S02E21	2	"Children's Playground"	Arnie Kalkauskas	A man recalls a late night game of hide and seek that he and his friends played at an abandoned playground.	David Cummings	David Cummings	February 24, 2013
S02E21	3	"Baby Sister"	Leon Chan	A man begins to wonder who the mysterious presence that haunted him as a child was when his mother is found violently killed.	Michael McElroy	David Cummings	February 24, 2013
S02E21	4	"The Devil's Breath"	Arjun Anand	A college student's Colombian roommate tells him a childhood story from his own country about how the death of his cousin was closely tied with a notorious drug.	David Cummings	David Cummings	February 24, 2013
S02E21	5	"The Letter"	Hamish McGlasson	A man traveling in a foreign country finds himself stalked by unseen attackers.	Tyler Privett	David Cummings	February 24, 2013
S02E22	1	"The First Person to Surgically Remove Their Own Brain"	Thomas Thompson	A medical student is deeply disturbed by his egotistical roommate's quest for scientific immortality.	David Cummings	David Cummings	October 3, 2013
S02E22	2	"9004"	Afia Gyennin	A college student keeps receiving texts that name things as he walks past them... despite the fact that he's clearly alone.	Jörn Meyer	David Cummings	October 3, 2013
S02E22	3	"An Unexpected Guest"	William Dalphin	A man goes to stay at his friend's house, but he has to stay in the attic bedroom - outside of which his friend's wife's uncle constantly paces around, crying and moaning.	David Cummings	David Cummings	October 3, 2013
S02E22	4	"Forget Me Not"	Kelsey Donald	A high schooler, after being released from the mind control that aliens have placed upon the world, finds herself on a barren, decimated wasteland where the residents think everything is perfectly normal around them.	Nikolle Doolin	David Cummings	October 3, 2013
S02E23	1	"Camera #36"	Leon Chan	A security camera installer goes to meet a coworker to install cameras in a new building, but when he arrives, the cameras have already been installed and the coworker is nowhere to be found.	David Cummings	David Cummings	March 23, 2013
S02E23	2	"Stairs of Dark Oak"	Anton Scheller	A couple reveals the reason they moved out of their new home.	Ray Sizemore	David Cummings	March 23, 2013
S02E23	3	"She Was Just a Child"	Neil Balthazar	In a busy city in India, a man who recently lost his daughter insists a demon possessed and killed her.	David Cummings	David Cummings	March 23, 2013
S02E23	4	"The Doll With the Lifelike Eyes"	Matthew Biel	A high school student goes to babysit for a family that lives in the oldest house in town.	Jinny Sanders	David Cummings	March 23, 2013
S02E24	1	"Cheyenne to Portland"	Harlan Guthrie	A man traveling by late-night train shares a compartment with an unsettling fellow passenger.	David Cummings	David Cummings	July 4, 2013
S02E24	2	"Stranger in the Night"	Mark Harrison	A man's girlfriend is tormented by a supposed ghost that lives in their new house.	David Cummings	David Cummings	July 4, 2013
S02E24	3	"We All End Up Here"	Thomas Thompson	A man is stalked by the ghost of his deeply religious grandmother.	David Cummings	David Cummings	July 4, 2013
S02E24	4	"You May See Some People"	Milos Bogetic	A man recalls a childhood incident where he was trapped in a snowbound cabin with his grandmother and the strange creatures that appeared outside the windows.	David Cummings	David Cummings	July 4, 2013
S02E25	1	"Jack in the Box"	Graham McBride	A group of drunk college students make a late night run to Jack in the Box... but there's something wrong with the girl at the drive-thru window...	David Cummings, Jinny Sanders	David Cummings	April 21, 2013
S02E25	2	"Old MacDonald Had a Farm"	Anton Scheller	A young woman recalls the horrifying discovery her older brother made while going to fix a telephone line at a secluded farm.	Jinny Sanders	David Cummings	April 21, 2013
S02E25	3	"Autopilot"	Kevin Thomas	A break in a man's daily routine leads to tragic consequences.	David Cummings	David Cummings	April 21, 2013
S02E25	4	"Victim's Glass"	Ari Nestlebaum	A couple on the verge of divorce visits a haunted house attraction. At first, the husband is only bored by it... but it soon comes to cause him great horror.	Ray Sizemore	David Cummings	April 21, 2013
S02E25	5	"Always Leave Work on Time"	Anton Scheller	A man gets stuck alone in an elevator on his way home from work... but is he truly alone...?	David Cummings	David Cummings	April 21, 2013
S02E25	6	"Psychosis"	Matt Dymerski	A paranoid man who lives in a basement apartment is convinced that the world has been taken over by aliens after not seeing or hearing from anyone for three days.	Wendy Corrigan, David Cummings	David Cummings	April 21, 2013

=== Season 3 ===
*Free Story

Season & Episode	Story #	Story	Author	Summary	Voice Actor(s)	Producer	Music	Release Date
S03E01	1*	"In the Darkness of the Fields"	Edward Warren	A man recalls his childhood visits to his grandmother's farm - and the strange old woman he would see dancing in the fields at night.	David Cummings	David Cummings	David Cummings	May 19, 2013
S03E01	2	"Poor Little Babysitter"	Cliff Barlow	An out-of-work child psychologist is forced to turn to babysitting to make ends meet.	Travis Newton	David Cummings	David Cummings	May 19, 2013
S03E01	3	"The Soul Game"	Christopher Bloodworth	A young mother is chilled by a disturbing game that a friend of her son's taught him.	Nina Jacobs	David Cummings	David Cummings	May 19, 2013
S03E01	4	"The House with Painted Doors"	Leon Chan	A grieving father explains the connection between his young daughter's disappearance and the doors painted into the walls, floors, and ceilings of their new home.	David Cummings	David Cummings	David Cummings	May 19, 2013
S03E02	1*	"The Passenger"	Michael Whitehouse	A single mother boards a bus for a late-night ride home, but is concerned when the only other passenger is a mysterious stranger with a hood over their face.	David Cummings	David Cummings	David Cummings	February 6, 2013
S03E02	2	"The Figure in the Nursery"	Elise Brazeal Dagnaar	A young mother looks into her video baby monitor one day and sees a smiling creature crouched under her daughter's crib.	Stephanie Dohrs	David Cummings	David Cummings	February 6, 2013
S03E02	3	"Love Notes"	Kendra Bledsoe	A young woman is disturbed by her boyfriend's increasingly bizarre love letters.	Corinne Sanders	David Cummings	David Cummings	February 6, 2013
S03E02	4	"Ultrasound"	Kevin Thomas	A science teacher, desperate to find an experiment that will keep his rowdy class interested, takes everything one step too far.	David Cummings	David Cummings	David Cummings	February 6, 2013
Season 03 Bonus 01 2nd Anniversary	1*	"Frost"	Johnny Nava	A young man's life begins to fall apart after he befriends a charismatic vigilante.	David Cummings	David Cummings	David Cummings	June 13, 2013
S03E03	1*	"Life of the Party"	Ryan Anderson	A teenager that delivers meat at a butcher shop is ordered to go to a strange house in a cemetery.	Elle Hama	David Cummings	David Cummings	June 16, 2013
S03E03	2*	"DECEASD"	Benjamin Feiner	A worker at a popular clothing store's call center has an unsettling conversation with an old woman.	David Cummings	David Cummings	David Cummings	June 16, 2013
S03E03	3	"The Bunk Bed"	Aaron Chrisjohn	A boy spends a traumatic night in a bunk that he and his recently deceased friend used to share.	Cody Banning	David Cummings	David Cummings	June 16, 2013
S03E03	4	"Eggs"	Garon Cockrell	A mentally handicapped old woman goes grocery shopping one day, and hears the eggs in the dairy isle talking to her.	David Cummings	David Cummings	David Cummings	June 16, 2013
S03E03	5	"Have You Seen This Child?"	Kelsey Donald	A mother's car breaks down in front of a seemingly abandoned factory.	Nikolle Doolin	David Cummings	David Cummings	June 16, 2013
S03E03	6	"New Neighbors"	Tyler Duke	A man hears screaming coming from his new neighbor's shed every night.	David Cummings	David Cummings	David Cummings	June 16, 2013
S03E04	1*	"Drinking Games"	Edwin Crowe	A group of young boys' trip to a mountain cabin goes horribly wrong when the drunken group decides to play a game of Russian Roulette.	David Cummings	David Cummings	David Cummings	June 30, 2013
S03E04	2	"Fake Beats"	Milos Bogetic	A man buys a set of headphones off the internet, but soon discovers he can hear his neighbors' telephone conversations through them.	Wendy Corrigan, David Cummings	David Cummings	David Cummings	June 30, 2013
S03E04	3	"Sibling Rivalry"	Meghan O'Hara Murray	A woman moves into the house where her abusive older brother used to live before his death - and wonders if his presence still lingers.	Nikolle Doolin	David Cummings	David Cummings	June 30, 2013
S03E04	4	"Bird Flu"	Anton Scheller	A man and his girlfriend find themselves deathly ill after finding a hollow egg inside their fridge.	David Cummings	David Cummings	Brandon Boone	June 30, 2013
S03E04	5	"One Condition"	Anton Scheller	A man is disturbed by the strange noises and awful smells he experiences coming from his roommate's room late every night.	David Cummings	David Cummings	David Cummings	June 30, 2013
S03E04	6	"Cindy"	Laura Waldner	A teenager accepts a babysitting job, but when she arrives at the house late at night, no one is there.	Elle Hama	David Cummings	David Cummings	June 30, 2013
S03E05	1*	"The Thing That Will Kill Me"	Ashley Rose Wellman	A fortune teller gives a young man vague details about something she claims is planning to kill him.	Will Rogers, Allie Palmer	David Cummings	Brandon Boone	July 14, 2013
S03E05	2*	"The Mine"	Grant Rennet	A man tells the gruesome tale about how he survived a massacre that occurred in an abandoned mineshaft.	David Cummings	David Cummings	David Cummings	July 14, 2013
S03E05	3	"The Accident"	Claverhouse	A grievously injured man with bandages over his eyes wakes up after a terrible accident.	James Cleveland	David Cummings	David Cummings	July 14, 2013
S03E05	4	"Losing a Friend on Facebook"	Tim Webster	A worker at a hospital comes to realize that the suicide of one of his coworkers is tied to a certain room where a hard-to-please patient died years before.	David Cummings	David Cummings	David Cummings	July 14, 2013
S03E05	5	"The White Room"	Claverhouse	A father, desperate to escape his mundane life, turns to lucid dreaming.	Mark Nelson	David Cummings	David Cummings	July 14, 2013
S03E06	1*	"Just £3 a Month Can Save a Child's Life"	Kevin Thomas	A man decides to exact a chilling revenge on a hypocritical friend who preaches the importance of giving to charity.	James Cleveland	David Cummings	Brandon Boone	July 28, 2013
S03E06	2*	"Bigger Fish"	Eric Ponslee	Two college students interview an old sea captain locked up in a mental hospital for the murder of an entire family on their luxury yacht.	David Cummings	David Cummings	David Cummings	July 28, 2013
S03E06	3	"The M Show Fan Club"	Anton Scheller	A woman recalls an incident from her childhood where the disappearance of over forty children had a connection with the fan club of a popular kids' show.	Leslee Mason	David Cummings	David Cummings	July 28, 2013
S03E06	4	"White Noise"	Anton Scheller	A man, after suffering a horrible accident, realizes he can hear the voices of the fates, otherworldly beings that decide what happens to every human being on earth.	James Cleveland	David Cummings	David Cummings	July 28, 2013
S03E06	5	"I've Been Intimate With a Ghost"	Chance Patrick	A man who recently went through a messy divorce finds himself stalked by a ghostly woman whom he feels inexplicably drawn to.	David Cummings	David Cummings	David Cummings	July 28, 2013
S03E07	1*	"Just Another Night"	Drew Vitalduel	A young man home alone receives frequent phone calls from his brother after he (the brother) is in a car crash.	David Cummings	David Cummings	David Cummings	November 8, 2013
S03E07	2*	"Why I Didn't Shower For 21 Years"	Chance Patrick	A man's intense fear of showering can be traced back to a horrifying incident from his childhood.	David Cummings	David Cummings	David Cummings	November 8, 2013
S03E07	3	"The Forbidden Third Floor"	Isabelle Jenner	A young girl, while visiting her aunt's house, is strongly warned to never go up to the third floor of the mansion.	Marmalade Hanna	David Cummings	David Cummings	November 8, 2013
S03E07	4	"Mor Mor's House"	Natalie Lys	A family, grieving from the death of their eccentric matriarch, is struck by disturbing events after finding voodoo totems hidden around her huge mansion.	Nancy Beard	David Cummings	David Cummings	November 8, 2013
S03E07	5	"Say Cheese!"	Louis Valenti	A duo of urban explorers decide to investigate a dilapidated hotel that was quickly abandoned after it opened for an unknown reason.	David Cummings	David Cummings	David Cummings	November 8, 2013
S03E08	1*	"2,300 a Day"	Troy Lewis	A man becomes obsessed with finding the meaning behind a station that he constantly hears playing on his radio.	David Cummings	David Cummings	David Cummings	August 25, 2013
S03E08	2*	"Calls From My Girlfriend"	John Comics	A man asleep in his bed one night receives a phone call from his girlfriend, asking him to let her into their apartment.	David Cummings	David Cummings	Brandon Boone	August 25, 2013
S03E08	3	"REM Behavior Disorder"	Elizabeth Brochu	A young woman who suffers from sleepwalking night terrors goes to see a doctor but begins to question his motives when her nightmares get continually worse.	Christina Scholz	David Cummings	David Cummings	August 25, 2013
S03E08	4	"The Midnight Hike"	Kelsey Donald	A hiking instructor leads seven people on a midnight hike to a lake - but on the way back, they are joined by a malevolent presence.	David Cummings	David Cummings	David Cummings	August 25, 2013
S03E09	1*	"The Thing I Saw in the Woods"	Ryan Henderson	A young couple, out for a drive in the forest, stumble upon a terrifying creature that follows them home.	David Knopel	David Cummings	Brandon Boone	August 9, 2013
S03E09	2*	"Milk and Cookies"	L. Chan	An old man visits a junkyard every Friday night to give milk and cookies to the ghost of a lonely little girl he met as a child.	Peter Lewis	David Cummings	David Cummings	August 9, 2013
S03E09	3	"The Terrorizing of a Substitute Teacher"	Chance Patrick	Three students terrorize a substitute teacher during their youth, and two of them end up having horrible lives - is it a coincidence or is the teacher getting revenge?	David Cummings	David Cummings	David Cummings	August 9, 2013
S03E09	4	"My Grandfather Knew Why We Run from the Dark"	Anton Scheller	A man's grandfather recounts a chilling ordeal that he and his entire squad suffered through during WW2.	David Cummings	David Cummings	David Cummings	August 9, 2013
S03E09	5	"Jesus Camp"	Rachel Mari	A woman's belief in God can be traced back to a series of disturbing events that happened during a long-ago summer at her bible camp.	Jenni Higginbotham	David Cummings	David Cummings	August 9, 2013
S03E10	1*	"Heat Stroke"	Kevin Thomas	A man suffers heat stroke during a concert in Japan; as his symptoms get worse, a mysterious shadow starts stalking him.	Peter Lewis	David Cummings	David Cummings	September 22, 2013
S03E10	2*	"Olivia"	William Dalphin	A man receives a letter from his friend weeks after her mysterious suicide.	David Cummings	David Cummings	David Cummings	September 22, 2013
S03E10	3	"The Sleep Clinic"	Claverhouse	An unemployed man takes a job as a night watchman at a sinister clinic where sleep studies are conducted.	James Cleveland	David Cummings	Brandon Boone	September 22, 2013
S03E10	4	"Daycare"	L. Chan	A young woman who works at a daycare is disturbed by the strange behavior of one father as he drops his daughter off one day.	Elle Hama	David Cummings	David Cummings	September 22, 2013
S03E10	5	"What Stays Behind"	Richard Steed	Throughout his life, a man comes to learn that he has a knack for stumbling upon places where disturbing events happened long ago.	David Cummings	David Cummings	David Cummings	September 22, 2013
S03E11	1*	"Anecdotes in Ashes"	The Assembly	A variety of authors share extremely short tales involving strange museums, odd haunted houses, and weird operations, among other topics.	Nikolle Doolin, Peter Lewis, David Cummings	David Cummings	David Cummings	June 10, 2013
S03E11	2*	"Patient Sigma"	Eric Ponslee	A psychologist examines a decorated soldier who was clinically dead for thirty seconds to determine why he brutally slaughtered his whole squadron.	David Cummings	David Cummings	David Cummings	June 10, 2013
S03E11	3	"All the Swans are Gone"	Catriona Richards	A man's town is slowly deserted over time as nighttime attacks from a mysterious creature escalate.	James Cleveland	David Cummings	Brandon Boone	June 10, 2013
S03E11	4	"Captivity"	Aaron Harris	A kidnapped man tries to escape from the basement of a house deep in the woods.	David Cummings	David Cummings	David Cummings	June 10, 2013
S03E11	5	"The Red Light in the Warehouse"	Chance Patrick	A young boy, trying to impress his friend, ventures into an abandoned warehouse where a red light always burns.	Peter Lewis	David Cummings	David Cummings	June 10, 2013
S03E12	1*	"When One Window Closes"	Christopher Bosdal	A husband in a strained relationship with his wife wakes up one morning to find a window in the wall of the bedroom... only it wasn't there before.	Peter Lewis	David Cummings	Brandon Boone	October 20, 2013
S03E12	2*	"Trust"	Ian Wallwork	A single dad is wary to let his adopted daughter meet her real father.	David Cummings	David Cummings	David Cummings	October 20, 2013
S03E12	3	"Once You See Them"	Kevin Thomas	A college student, home for the holidays, stays in his sister's old bedroom - a room where she claims she saw shadowy figures every night.	Peter Lewis	David Cummings	Tice Thomason, David Cummings	October 20, 2013
S03E12	4	"BANG"	Roxi Moon	A woman waiting for her boyfriend to come home from his late-night job is tormented by a constant banging noise coming from somewhere outside her house.	Christina Scholz	David Cummings	Tice Thomason, David Cummings	October 20, 2013
S03E12	5	"October 29, 2013"	Nicole Snow	A woman whose sister recently died receives a stack of letters by her, to be opened on specific dates.	Nikolle Doolin	David Cummings	Tice Thomason, David Cummings	October 20, 2013
S03E12	6	"What the Paperboy Saw"	Trevor Boelter	A former paperboy recalls a chilling incident that transpired during an early-morning delivery route.	David Cummings	David Cummings	David Cummings	October 20, 2013
Season 03 Bonus 02 Halloween 2013	1*	"Pretty"	Mike Provo	A woman at a Halloween party is disturbed by one man's incredibly lifelike mask.	Peter Lewis	David Cummings	David Cummings	October 31, 2013
Season 03 Bonus 02 Halloween 2013	2*	"October 30"	Donald Moffat	A man is unsettled by a strange encounter with a young girl on his front lawn.	David Cummings	David Cummings	Brandon Boone	October 31, 2013
Season 03 Bonus 02 Halloween 2013	3	"A Walk Home on Halloween"	Alexander McHugh	A man walking home from work late at night finds himself stalked by two people: a crying teenage girl and a threatening voice that says it wants to kill him.	James Cleveland	David Cummings	Brandon Boone	October 31, 2013
Season 03 Bonus 02 Halloween 2013	4	"Tempting Fate"	Edwin Crowe	On Halloween night, a dare goes horribly wrong for two brothers and their friend.	David Cummings	David Cummings	David Cummings	October 31, 2013
Season 03 Bonus 02 Halloween 2013	5	"Hunger"	William Dalphin	A doctor agrees to meet a girl with an eating disorder - but she gets stuck in the elevator on the way up to his office.	David Cummings	David Cummings	David Cummings	October 31, 2013
Season Pass 03 Bonus 01 Halloween 2013	1	"Can I Use the Bathroom?"	Merrill Grady	A man opens his door one Halloween night to see a deathly pale child that asks to use his bathroom.	Peter Lewis	David Cummings	Brandon Boone	October 31, 2013
Season Pass 03 Bonus 01 Halloween 2013	2	"Exit 21"	Jonathan Reiman	Two friends take the wrong exit one Halloween night and find themselves lost in a deserted town.	David Cummings	David Cummings	David Cummings	October 31, 2013
Season Pass 03 Bonus 01 Halloween 2013	3	"One Last Trick-or-Treat"	L. Chan	A man is disturbed by a pair of silent trick-or-treaters that visit his house on Halloween night.	Peter Lewis	David Cummings	David Cummings	October 31, 2013
Season Pass 03 Bonus 01 Halloween 2013	4	"Two Stories of the Haunted Cave"	William Dalphin	A man takes his wife's younger siblings to a haunted house attraction - a venue where one of his classmates vanished mysteriously twenty years before.	Peter Lewis	David Cummings	David Cummings	October 31, 2013
S03E13	1*	"The Girl in My Dreams"	Jonathan Stiles	A man recalls a strange dream he would have periodically during his childhood involving a strange girl who would chase him through the woods.	Peter Lewis	David Cummings	Brandon Boone	November 17, 2013
S03E13	2*	"A Face in the Crowd"	Claverhouse	A man begins to see how people will look shortly after they die.	Kyle Akers	David Cummings	David Cummings	November 17, 2013
S03E13	3	"Not Now, Eric"	Claire Newman	A woman is stalked by a friendly ghost soon after she moves into an old bungalow.	Kristin Gjerløw	David Cummings	Brandon Boone	November 17, 2013
S03E13	4	"3913"	Mitch Truesdale	A man moves into a haunted apartment and watches as his life slowly crumbles around him.	David Cummings	David Cummings	David Cummings	November 17, 2013
S03E13	5	"Whispers"	Alex Kerr	Two siblings doubt the validity of an urban legend until it starts showing signs of coming true.	Gary Etchingham	David Cummings	David Cummings	November 17, 2013
S03E14	1*	"You Won't Hear About This on the News"	Meghan O' Hara Murray	A college student explains the strange events that lead up to a shooting in his dorm building.	David Cummings	David Cummings	David Cummings	January 12, 2013
S03E14	2*	"The Cocoa Jumping Spider"	Matthew Christopher Brenner	A group of bloodthirsty spiders descends upon a suburban neighborhood one summer evening.	Peter Lewis	David Cummings	Brandon Boone	January 12, 2013
S03E14	3	"A Sketchy Interview"	Matt Dymerski	A man shares an odd experience he had when he accepted a late-night job interview at an old factory.	David Cummings	David Cummings	David Cummings	January 12, 2013
S03E14	4	"My Coworker Killed Himself"	Malicies Dank	A worker at a laboratory discovers the horrifying reason that led to his coworker's suicide.	Peter Lewis	David Cummings	Brandon Boone	January 12, 2013
S03E14	5	"Bits and Pieces"	Michael Whitehouse	A scientist becomes obsessed with a strange corpse she found on a scientific dig in Scotland.	Michael Whitehouse	David Cummings	David Cummings	January 12, 2013
S03E14	6	"8th-Grade Math"	Forrest King	A man shares the experiences he had with a malevolent math teacher during middle school.	David Cummings	David Cummings	David Cummings	January 12, 2013
S03E15 Christmas 2013	1*	"A Christmas Feast"	Michael Whitehouse	A family has sinister intentions for their elderly guest during Christmas dinner.	Peter Lewis	David Cummings	David Cummings	December 15, 2013
S03E15 Christmas 2013	2*	"The Dead Girl's Valentine"	Meghan O'Hara Murray	After finding out that his unfaithful ex-girlfriend has died, a man decides to visit the school where she worked and discovers that although she has died, she may not have passed on...	David Cummings	David Cummings	Brandon Boone	December 15, 2013
S03E15 Christmas 2013	3	"Christmas Shopping"	Anton Scheller	A man has a horrifying experience while trying to get in a little early shopping for the holidays.	Matt Grant	David Cummings	David Cummings	December 15, 2013
S03E15 Christmas 2013	4	"Don't Turn On the Lights, Mommy"	Steven Horn	A man recalls a traumatizing event that took place on one Christmas from his childhood.	Kellie Fitzgerald, David Cummings	David Cummings	Brandon Boone	December 15, 2013
S03E15 Christmas 2013	5	"Red Christmas"	Anton Scheller	A chilling encounter leads one man to discover just how far some people take the concept of "naughty" and "nice".	Barnabas Deimos	David Cummings	David Cummings	December 15, 2013
S03E15 Christmas 2013	6	"The Chimney Man"	Phillip Howard	One man takes it upon himself to protect his community from people who would defile the holiday season.	Peter Lewis	David Cummings	David Cummings	December 15, 2013
S03E15 Christmas 2013	7	"The Christmas Tree"	Michael Whitehouse	One year after the death of his beloved wife, a man learns the horrible truth about what caused her untimely passing.	David Cummings	David Cummings	David Cummings	December 15, 2013
S03E16	1*	"This is a Warning"	M.J. Pack	A horror movie fan buys a drug off the internet that causes the user to have vivid nightmares.	Peter Lewis	David Cummings	David Cummings	May 1, 2014
S03E16	2*	"The Voice on the Radio"	Carlos Rivera	After receiving an old CB radio from his grandfather, a young man begins talking to a stranger who comes from farther away than the boy could have ever imagined.	David Cummings	David Cummings	David Cummings	May 1, 2014
S03E16	3	"All the Papers Lied Tonight"	Meghan O'Hara Murray	A young woman notices that she acts and feels differently after a terrible accident lands her in the hospital.	Kellie Fitzgerald	David Cummings	Brandon Boone	May 1, 2014
S03E16	4	"The Cross by the Railroad Tracks"	William Dalphin	A counselor tells a group of boy scouts a creepy old campfire legend - one that turns out to be more true than originally thought.	David Cummings	David Cummings	Brandon Boone	May 1, 2014
S03E16	5	"Fred"	Andrew Tanner	A man shares his story of a chance meeting with a homeless man named Fred.	Peter Lewis, David Cummings	David Cummings	David Cummings	May 1, 2014
S03E17	1*	"I Used to Sit There"	F.J.F. McTiernan	A man who likes to sit on a bench near a lake by his house sees ghostly lights floating in the woods across the water.	David Cummings	David Cummings	Brandon Boone	January 19, 2014
S03E17	2*	"Writer's Block"	Serge Hellman	An author shares his effective way to overcome writer's block.	Peter Lewis	David Cummings	David Cummings	January 19, 2014
S03E17	3	"1957"	Chance Patrick	A young man interviews his grandfather about a frightening occurrence he witnessed in an isolated campsite back in 1957.	David Cummings	David Cummings	David Cummings	January 19, 2014
S03E17	4	"Tent Number 7"	M.J. Pack	A woman shares a chilling experience she had during a stay at summer camp when she was young.	Elle Hama	David Cummings	David Cummings	January 19, 2014
S03E17	5	"Tonight Us"	James Birkenhead	A renowned psychologist is assigned to the case of a young boy who can't stop hearing voices in his head.	David Cummings	David Cummings	David Cummings	January 19, 2014
S03E18	1*	"Grandpa's Second Voice"	Paige Penfold	A man recalls an odd affliction his grandfather had - whenever he spoke, another voice would speak quietly underneath.	David Cummings	David Cummings	David Cummings	February 2, 2014
S03E18	2*	"Heart of Plastic"	Otis Mari	A man is disturbed by his appearance-obsessed wife's strange attempts to get their daughter to lose weight.	David Cummings	David Cummings	David Cummings	February 2, 2014
S03E18	3*	"DMV"	Milos Bogetic	A man shares the story of his friend's odd visit to the DMV late one night.	David Cummings	David Cummings	David Cummings	February 2, 2014
S03E18	4	"Inside the Ceiling"	Anton Scheller	A young woman is annoyed by the puddles of water that keep appearing in odd places around her apartment.	Elle Hama	David Cummings	Brandon Boone	February 2, 2014
S03E18	5	"The Holes in My Teeth"	Alyse North	A man wakes up one morning to an odd sight in the mirror- every one of his teeth has a perfect round hole right in the middle of it.	David Cummings	David Cummings	David Cummings	February 2, 2014
S03E18	6	"I Dreamt of a Black Teapot"	Anton Scheller	A young woman recalls the strange dreams she had as a child while she suffered from heat stroke.	Elle Hama	David Cummings	Brandon Boone	February 2, 2014
S03E18	7	"Holsey Farms"	Jack Lee	A man describes a terrifying visit to a pumpkin farm he took with his girlfriend.	David Cummings	David Cummings	David Cummings	February 2, 2014
S03E19	1*	"The Melody"	Rio Hererra	A man who saw a ghost playing a beautiful melody on a harp when he was a child spends years trying to recreate that heavenly sound.	Otis Jiry	David Cummings	David Cummings	February 16, 2014
S03E19	2*	"My Basement"	Cliff Barlow	A man returns to his childhood home to find out once and for all what led to his brother's disappearance years ago.	David Cummings	David Cummings	David Cummings	February 16, 2014
S03E19	3	"Footsteps"	Claverhouse	A man desperate to escape his dysfunctional family goes on a run in the mountains - and stumbles upon a sight he never could have expected.	Kyle Akers	David Cummings	Brandon Boone	February 16, 2014
S03E19	4	"Betsy the Doll"	C.K. Walker	A young woman recalls her fondness for an incredibly lifelike doll she had as a child.	Jessica Prokuski	David Cummings	David Cummings	February 16, 2014
S03E19	5	"Scenes From a Road Trip"	Richard Jones	A man takes a long road trip to try and come to terms with his beloved daughter's death.	Gary Etchingham	David Cummings	Brandon Boone	February 16, 2014
S03E19	6	"Won't You Invite Me Inside?"	Chance Patrick	A man recalls an odd story his great-grandfather used to tell him about a strange creature that would come to his window late at night.	David Cummings	David Cummings	David Cummings	February 16, 2014
S03E19	7	"Locked In"	Kelsey Donald	A young woman leaves something at work and goes back to the building late at night to retrieve it... but finds herself stalked by a strange presence.	Jenni Higginbotham	David Cummings	David Cummings	February 16, 2014
S03E20	1*	"Security Cameras"	DJ Crisman	A man goes home after a long day of work and checks on the security feed from his office for the day - and finds out that a terrifying creature was watching him.	David Wolfe	David Cummings	David Cummings	February 3, 2014
S03E20	2*	"Hide and Go Seek"	Al Apanamo	A man recalls the terrifying thing he discovered in the closet of an abandoned house during a childhood game of hide and seek.	Michael Edward Miller	David Cummings	David Cummings	February 3, 2014
S03E20	3*	"Burnout"	Dave Taylor	A socially awkward security guard starts a relationship with the secretary of the new building he's monitoring.	Kyle Akers	David Cummings	David Cummings	February 3, 2014
S03E20	4	"Crisis"	Maggie Louise	A suicide prevention officer learns the horrifying truth behind a man's attempted suicide.	Gary Etchingham	David Cummings	Brandon Boone	February 3, 2014
S03E20	5	"Playful Giants"	Andy Pham	A father is wracked by nightmares about giants lifting up his house and grabbing him while he sleeps in his bed.	Kyle Akers, Peter Lewis	David Cummings	David Cummings	February 3, 2014
S03E20	6	"Victoria"	Maggie Louise	A man begins a relationship with an odd young woman whom his other friends claim they have never met.	Peter Lewis	David Cummings	Brandon Boone	February 3, 2014
S03E20	7	"Unknown Cargo"	Jon Patrick	A former sailor recalls a terrifying night he spent on a cargo barge that involved a rich man's very strange export.	David Cummings	David Cummings	David Cummings	February 3, 2014
Season 03 Pass Bonus Episode 02	1	"Suddenly Shocking: Vol. 1"	Multiple Authors	A variety of authors share over fifty short "micro-horrors" - extremely short horror stories, ranging from one page to three sentences long.	David Cummings, Rebecca Peason, L. Bentley, Peter Lewis, Jessica McEvoy, Wendy Corrigan	David Cummings	David Cummings	April 3, 2014
Season 03 Pass Bonus Episode 03	1	"Operation Stingray"	Carlos Rivera	In this long tale, a man finds himself running for his life after a friend of his lets him in on a huge conspiracy.	Jesse Comett, Matt Grant, Barnabas Deimos, Kellie Fitzgerald, Jenni Higginbotham, David Cummings, Peter Lewis	David Cummings	David Cummings	September 3, 2014
S03E21	1*	"It Wasn't My Stop"	Juan Flores	A young woman notices an odd thing on the bus home from work - a man who calls out a person's stop miles before they get off.	Jessica McEvoy	David Cummings	Brandon Boone	March 16, 2014
S03E21	2*	"What It Said"	Jon Patrick	A prosperous college student saves up enough money to send a probe into space to look for alien life.	Kyle Akers	David Cummings	David Cummings	March 16, 2014
S03E21	3*	"The Cecil Hotel"	Mateo Hellion	A woman has several frightening experiences when she spends a night in Los Angeles's infamous Cecil Hotel.	Lynne Darlington, David Cummings	David Cummings	Brandon Boone	March 16, 2014
S03E21	4	"Just Another Lee-Enfield Rifle"	Alex Hetherinton	A teenager buys a mysterious rifle that transports anyone who touches it to an English trench moments before a charge into No Man's Land during WWI.	David Cummings	David Cummings	David Cummings	March 16, 2014
S03E21	5	"Viola's Baby"	Catriona Richards	A young husband is excited at the prospect of having a child despite his wife's frequent attempts to abort the baby.	Wendy Corrigan, David Cummings	David Cummings	David Cummings	March 16, 2014
S03E21	6	"The Warren"	Liz Stokes	A family is quarantined in their home after the global outbreak of a deadly illness.	Ricardo Chica, Jessica McEvoy, Kellie Fitzgerald, David Cummings	David Cummings	David Cummings	March 16, 2014
S03E22	1*	"Jessie's Collection"	Amanda Lewis	A young girl with a strange ability enacts a chilling revenge on a bullying classmate.	Peter Lewis	David Cummings	Brandon Boone	March 30, 2014
S03E22	2*	"Cold Room"	Eric Cleveland	A teenager discovers a hidden door in her parents' closet.	Jessica McEvoy	David Cummings	David Cummings	March 30, 2014
S03E22	3	"I Was Never a Cat Person"	Ann Drenner	After finding a stray cat on the side of the road, a woman takes it home but soon discovers it harbors a strange appetite...	L. Bentley	David Cummings	David Cummings	March 30, 2014
S03E22	4	"Character Within"	Mateo Hellion	A man takes a job as a costumed character at a theme park but is deeply disturbed by his fellow costumer's strange after-hours ritual.	Matt Grant	David Cummings	Brandon Boone	March 30, 2014
S03E22	5	"The Last Train Home"	L. Chan	A man takes a late-night train home from work but is unsettled by his fellow passengers' strange appearance and behavior.	L. Bentley, David Cummings	David Cummings	David Cummings	March 30, 2014
S03E22	6	"Pro-Life"	M. Grayson	A young woman finds herself trapped when her extremely religious fiancée won't let her abort their baby despite the knowledge that it will most likely be stillborn.	Corrine Sanders	David Cummings	David Cummings	March 30, 2014
S03E23	1*	"Morning Mail"	Karen Tory	A woman receives an odd package in the mail that is tied to a disturbing incident that occurred in her local park when she was a teenager.	L. Bentley	David Cummings	Brandon Boone	April 13, 2014
S03E23	2*	"The Stuff My Grandpa Saw"	Miss Hannah	A man shares a story his grandfather told him about a horrifying crime scene he stumbled upon during his days as a rookie cop.	David Cummings	David Cummings	David Cummings	April 13, 2014
S03E23	3	"The Journey of a Solipsist"	Alexander Isaacs	A woman obsessed with solipsism spends her entire life wondering exactly what death is.	Jessica McEvoy	David Cummings	Brandon Boone	April 13, 2014
S03E23	4	"Pranks"	Eric Ponslee	Three friends decide to venture out to a haunted bridge late one night... but things go wrong when one of them disappears.	Peter Lewis	David Cummings	Brandon Boone	April 13, 2014
S03E23	5	"Icing Addiction"	Lykaia Quinn	A young woman's physical and mental health rapidly deteriorates as she becomes obsessed with eating frosting.	Corrine Sanders	David Cummings	David Cummings	April 13, 2014
S03E23	6	"Sessions With Sara"	L. Chan	A psychologist is hired to examine a young woman who was held captive by a religious couple for years. As the examination continues, he begins to wonder if maybe the couple was right in keeping her locked up...	David Cummings	David Cummings	David Cummings	April 13, 2014
S03E24	1*	"The Manson Family"	Lena Caulfield	After a teenager's OCD-afflicted brother claims to have seen corpses in their basement, her classmates begin taunting her family with a cruel nickname.	Jessica McEvoy	David Cummings	Brandon Boone	April 27, 2014
S03E24	2*	"Channel 6"	Sean Elwood	A man moves into an apartment building where the residents are obsessed with a certain television station.	David Cummings	David Cummings	David Cummings	April 27, 2014
S03E24	3	"I Need Sound to Stay Normal"	Mika Tateyama	A woman explains why she fears silence.	Christina Scholz	David Cummings	Brandon Boone	April 27, 2014
S03E24	4	"I Never Saw the Light"	Joshua Pinon	A man's friend becomes afraid of death after nearly perishing in a terrible car crash.	David Cummings	David Cummings	Brandon Boone	April 27, 2014
S03E24	5	"How to Write a NoSleep Hit"	Anton Scheller	Author Anton Scheller shares his tips on how to write a good scary story - and how to make all of the tale's horrible events seem all too real.	Peter Lewis	David Cummings	David Cummings	April 27, 2014
S03E24	6	"Box Fort"	Julie Taylor	A teenager and her two sisters build a huge box fort on the second floor of their house... only to hear something moving through the tubes when none of them are inside it.	Rebecca Peason	David Cummings	David Cummings	April 27, 2014
S03E25	1*	"Toothache"	Carlos Rivera	A young woman finds an interesting way to escape her abusive father.	Rebecca Peason, David Cummings	David Cummings	David Cummings	April 27, 2014
S03E25	2*	"Soulless"	Anton Scheller	A group of students bully a strange new girl in their class.	L. Bentley	David Cummings	Brandon Boone	April 27, 2014
S03E25	3*	"Death at 423 Stockholm Street"	C.K. Walker	A young woman discovers the horrifying truth behind the scratching noises that have plagued her all of her life.	Rebecca Peason	David Cummings	Brandon Boone	April 27, 2014
S03E25	4*	"The Artist"	CJ Henderson	A man is disturbed by his artist wife's bizarre pieces, which become more and more horrifying as her mental health deteriorates.	David Cummings	David Cummings	David Cummings	April 27, 2014
S03E25	5*	"The Girl in the Log"	Melissa Phillips	A young girl visiting her grandfather's isolated mountain cabin falls asleep in the woods one day and wakes up no longer alone.	Corrine Sanders	David Cummings	Brandon Boone	April 27, 2014
S03E25	6*	"The Melancholy of Herbert Solomon"	Michael Whitehouse	A scholar finds historical records dating back to the 1600s detailing an account of a series of child murders and the outcast of the town that may have been wrongly accused of the crimes.	David Cummings	David Cummings	David Cummings	April 27, 2014

=== Season 4 ===
*Free Story

Season & Episode	Story #	Story	Author	Summary	Voice Actor(s)	Producer	Music	Release Date
S04E00	1	"Kingdom"	Liam Hogan	A king of a small, failing kingdom is visited by the king of a larger, more prosperous one.	David Cummings	David Cummings	David Cummings	May 25, 2014
S04E01	1*	"Pheromones"	Anton Scheller	A young woman buys a strange perfume off the internet that promises to attract every male to her.	Jessica McEvoy	David Cummings	Brandon Boone	January 6, 2014
S04E01	2*	"Beneath"	Matt Dymerski	A young couple, while visiting the girl's parents, is forced to sleep in the attic room.	Brian Mansi, L. Bentley	David Cummings	David Cummings	January 6, 2014
S04E01	3	"Unlocked"	Jon Patrick	A man, home alone while his wife is on a business trip, inadvertently invites something disturbing into his house.	Daniel Simon	David Cummings	Brandon Boone	January 6, 2014
S04E01	4	"How to See the Future"	Eric Ponslee	A scientific experiment attempting to give psychic powers to a young woman goes terribly wrong.	David Cummings	David Cummings	David Cummings	January 6, 2014
S04E01	5	"Behind Closed Doors"	Kelsey Donald	A young woman wonders if her strange aunt had something to do with the disappearance of her mother and father when she was a child.	L. Bentley	David Cummings	David Cummings	January 6, 2014
Season 04 Bonus Episode 01 3rd Anniversary Special	1*	"The Contract"	Aaron Shotwell	A hitman takes on an unusual contract which he soon regrets accepting.	David Cummings	David Cummings	David Cummings	June 13, 2014
Season 04 Bonus Episode 01 3rd Anniversary Special	2*	"A Klondike Horror"	Joshua L. Hood	In 1890s Alaska, a miner is stalked by a horrifying creature after he disturbs its lair.	David Cummings	David Cummings	David Cummings	June 13, 2014
S04E02	1*	"Redhouse"	Jill Berwick	A young mother takes her baby daughter out on a walk in the city and stumbles upon a strange, red house with an unsettling resident.	L. Bentley	David Cummings	Brandon Boone	June 15, 2014
S04E02	2*	"The Silence Experiment"	J.P. Leupold	A young woman who has been fascinated by silence her entire life books a two-hour stint in the world's quietest room.	Jessica McEvoy	David Cummings	David Cummings	June 15, 2014
S04E02	3*	"The Black Rain"	Logan Barker	An urban explorer stumbles upon a letter in a locked safe detailing a strange occurrence that befell a small town.	Alexis Bristowe, David Cummings	David Cummings	David Cummings	June 15, 2014
S04E02	4	"Christina Took Things"	Carlos Rivera	A woman exacts a chilling revenge upon her sister, who has taken everything from her.	Alexis Bristowe	David Cummings	Brandon Boone	June 15, 2014
S04E02	5	"I Am a Good Parent"	Stephanie Nguyen	A mother insists the strange way in which she raises her children makes her a good parent.	Corinne Sanders	David Cummings	Brandon Boone	June 15, 2014
S04E02	6	"Moderated"	Edwin Crowe	A man gets a job screening videos before they are uploaded to a popular video-watching site and is disturbed by what he sees.	Peter Lewis	David Cummings	David Cummings	June 15, 2014
S04E03	1*	"I Still Get Letters From My Dead Best Friend"	S.P. Trance	A young woman constantly gets letters from her friend that committed suicide when they were in high school.	Corinne Sanders	David Cummings	Brandon Boone	June 29, 2014
S04E03	2*	"Being a Detective Ruined My Marriage"	Maggie Louise	A detective's wife accuses him of cheating on her when she finds muddy shoes and a shirt in the back of their closet.	Peter Lewis	David Cummings	David Cummings	June 29, 2014
S04E03	3*	"Canadian Paranormal Investigator"	Grant Dykstra	A ghost hunter shares a terrifying experience he had one night when he and his friends broke into an abandoned hospital.	David Cummings	David Cummings	Brandon Boone	June 29, 2014
S04E03	4	"Peggy"	Heidi Helmer	A young woman shares two stories that become inexplicably intertwined: a young woman who is obsessed with her brother and the ghost of a young girl that haunts their house.	Jessica McEvoy	David Cummings	Brandon Boone	June 29, 2014
S04E03	5	"Dust"	Cameron Suey	A strange dust storm settles on a small southwestern town.	Derek Jensen, Jeff Clement	Jeff Clement	Jeff Clement	June 29, 2014
S04E03	6	"Mama Was a Doll Collector"	Lauren Meyers	A young woman is disturbed by her mother's fascination with dolls - a fascination that spans her entire life.	Jessica McEvoy	David Cummings	David Cummings	June 29, 2014
S04E03	7	"The Hobbit Hole"	William Dalphin	A family is disturbed by the strange experiences they have while visiting their in-laws.	Jessica McEvoy, David Cummings, Wendy Corrigan	David Cummings	David Cummings	June 29, 2014
S04E04	1*	"21 Day Quarantine"	Jon Patrick	A doctor who worked in Africa during the Ebola outbreak fears the disease is heading to America.	David Cummings	David Cummings	Brandon Boone	July 13, 2014
S04E04	2*	"Always Act as if Someone is Watching You"	Anton Scheller	While going through her family photo album, a young woman discovers something horrifying: a strange old man is in every picture of her.	L. Bentley, David Cummings	David Cummings	Brandon Boone	July 13, 2014
S04E04	3*	"Mailman"	Jessica Spencer	A mailman does a strange thing in order to impress one of his receivers.	Sean Nickley, Jenni Higginbotham	David Cummings	David Cummings	July 13, 2014
S04E04	4	"Hives"	Claverhouse	A college student's girlfriend is terrified that small creatures are living inside of her.	C.H. Williamson, Jessica McEvoy	David Cummings	Brandon Boone	July 13, 2014
S04E04	5	"Paradise Pine"	C.K. Walker	A couple book a week at an isolated mountain cabin and stumble across the guest book - and the previous couple's story about a frightening creature that lives in the woods.	Jessica McEvoy, David Cummings	David Cummings	David Cummings	July 13, 2014
S04E04	6	"The Queen's Guard"	Milos Bogetic	A guard in front of Buckingham Palace is stalked by a strange woman who does nothing but speak in numbers.	Brian Mansi, Caroline Breen Thorne, David Cummings	David Cummings	David Cummings	July 13, 2014
S04E05	1	"Snapchat"	Donald Bristow	A man receives increasingly disturbing messages from a follower on Snapchat.	Peter Lewis	David Cummings	David Cummings	July 27, 2014
S04E05	2	"The Curious World of Alice Becker"	Chance Patrick	A group of kids are amazed and terrified by a strange girl in their class who seems to predict the future.	Corinne Sanders	David Cummings	David Cummings	July 27, 2014
S04E05	3	"The Copycat Neighbors"	J.A. Martz	A family is elated to have new neighbors move in... until the newcomers begin to copy every aspect of their lives.	David Cummings, Tisha Boone	David Cummings	David Cummings	July 27, 2014
S04E05	4	"I Keep Beautiful Things"	Amelia Ferreru	A girl goes to horrifying lengths to earn the approval of her mother.	Jenni Higginbotham	David Cummings	David Cummings	July 27, 2014
S04E05	5	"A Lack of Evidence"	Kevin Thomas	A young police officer recalls a strange murder case that his grandfather, a detective, investigated long ago.	Peter Lewis, David Cummings	David Cummings	David Cummings	July 27, 2014
S04E05	6	"Perfect Mother"	L Chan	A woman is terrified that her newborn baby boy is being taken over by supernatural forces.	Jessica McEvoy	David Cummings	David Cummings	July 27, 2014
S04E06	1	"The Man With the Camera"	Edwin Crowe	A man is disturbed by the photos he sees on a stranger's camera while taking the subway home one evening.	Peter Lewis	David Cummings	Brandon Boone	October 8, 2014
S04E06	2	"Mr. Leaves"	Michael Whitehouse	A man grows concerned about his daughter's well-being after an increasingly disturbing series of events centered around her imaginary friend.	David Cummings Jessica McEvoy	David Cummings	David Cummings	October 8, 2014
S04E06	3	"The Disappearance of Ashley Morgan"	C.K. Walker	A young woman recalls the disappearance of her sister, the effect it had on her family, and the terrible truths that she discovered years later.	Corinne Sanders David Cummings Jessica McEvoy	David Cummings	Brandon Boone	October 8, 2014
S04E06	4	"Her Name Was Emma"	S.C. Young	A girl's group of friends take a practical joke way too far... or do they...?	Nikolle Doolin	David Cummings	David Cummings	October 8, 2014
S04E06	5	"Relationships"	Natasha Franks	A sheltered young woman starts a Tinder account despite the reservations of her very overprotective parents.	Jessica McEvoy David Cummings	David Cummings	David Cummings	October 8, 2014
S04E07	1	"The Cheater"	Kaitlyn Grenier	A woman decides to take revenge on her husband after a painful divorce.	Corinne Sanders	David Cummings	Brandon Boone	August 24, 2014
S04E07	2	"I Kept a Souvenir"	H.K. Reyes	A young woman shares the gruesome details of her abduction and torture at the hands of a psychopath.	Jessica McEvoy David Cummings	David Cummings	David Cummings	August 24, 2014
S04E07	3	"Drains in the Floor"	M.J. Pack	A famous ghost hunter shares the story of his scariest experience with a young girl in college.	David Cummings Rima Chaddha Mycynek	David Cummings	David Cummings	August 24, 2014
S04E07	4	"Never Ride Between the Train Cars"	D.B. Aaronson	A drifter encounters a terrifying apparition while hopping trains.	Sammy Raynor	David Cummings	Brandon Boone Max Pfeiffer	August 24, 2014
S04E07	5	"American White Hair"	Marcus Damanda	With the promise of high-grade cannabis, a young man lures an obnoxious classmate to a chilling fate in this modern retelling of Edgar Allan Poe's "The Cask of Amontillado".	David Cummings Jessica McEvoy	David Cummings	David Cummings	August 24, 2014
S04E08	1	"Still Water"	Claverhouse	A suicidal man gets way more than he ever bargained for after promising a year of his life to a stranger.	David Ault	David Cummings	Kerry Kelso	July 9, 2014
S04E08	2	"Torso"	Brighid NicGarran	Three friends investigate a supposedly haunted warehouse.	David Cummings Jon Reeder Rima Chaddha Mycynek	David Cummings	David Cummings	July 9, 2014
S04E08	3	"Dolls"	Greg Ryder	A young boy and his sister discover the terrifying reason why an old woman on their street lives alone.	Mark Copeland	David Cummings	David Cummings	July 9, 2014
S04E08	4	"Dinner By Swamp Light"	William Dalphin	A man shares memories of his childhood living near a swamp... and being hunted by the monsters that lived within it.	David Cummings	David Cummings	David Cummings	July 9, 2014
S04E08	5	"Witness Protection"	Alex White	A woman discovers the horrible truth about the death of her parents.	Corinne Sanders David Cummings	David Cummings	David Cummings	July 9, 2014
S04E08	6	"Method Acting"	Matt Dymerski	In this surreal story, a woman's disappearance sets in motion a series of events that leaves the very fabric of reality in question.	Peter Lewis David Cummings Tisha Boone	David Cummings	David Cummings	July 9, 2014
S04E09	1	"A Very True Haunting"	Greg Fox	A young woman becomes convinced that her uncle's house is haunted... but the truth is so much worse than she can imagine...	Jessica McEvoy	David Cummings	David Cummings	September 21, 2014
S04E09	2	"A Family Portrait"	L. Chan	A young couple purchases a painting from a bed and breakfast - a decision they both soon come to regret.	Norm Sherman Jessica McEvoy David Cummings	David Cummings	Tisha Boone	September 21, 2014
S04E09	3	"She's Still Here"	Christie Gable	A woman's dreams are haunted by the phantom of a little girl.	Alexis Bristowe	David Cummings	Kerry Kelso	September 21, 2014
S04E09	4	"I Died Again Last Night"	Ashley Franz Holzmann	A woman inexplicably experiences the lives of countless other people hours before their death.	Corinne Sanders	David Cummings	Kerry Kelso	September 21, 2014
S04E09	5	"The Greater Good"	Edwin Crowe	A man goes to unthinkable lengths to bring to justice a criminal he believes has evaded the law.	Peter Lewis	David Cummings	David Cummings	September 21, 2014
S04E09	6	"The Diner"	L.J. Dishaw	While on a road trip, a young woman stops at a retro-styled diner with a sinister secret.	Nichole Goodnight David Cummings	David Cummings	David Cummings	September 21, 2014
S04E09	7	"The Devil Lives on Old Mill Road"	William Dalphin	A man recalls an encounter with an old woman he had as a young boy on a road forbidden to him by his grandfather.	David Cummings Alexis Bristowe	David Cummings	David Cummings	September 21, 2014
S04E10	1	"The Divorce Papers"	Tierney Ashton Campbell	Two men, although strangers, begin to have very prophetic dreams about each other.	David Ault Brian Mansi L. Bentley	David Cummings	David Cummings	September 28, 2014
S04E10	2	"Lumpy"	Susan Lester	Told through a series of emails, a woman slowly succumbs to madness... possibly because of supernatural forces.	Alexis Bristowe Jessica McEvoy David Cummings	David Cummings	David Cummings	September 28, 2014
S04E10	3	"Aiden's Spot"	C.K. Walker	A woman returns to the secluded place where she often spent time with her childhood crush.	Danielle McRae	David Cummings	David Cummings	September 28, 2014
S04E10	4	"The Lucienne Twins"	Leonard Petracci	A teacher becomes deeply involved in the life of one of her students: a troubled little girl who shares a very deep bond with her twin sister.	Rebecca Peason	David Cummings	David Cummings	September 28, 2014
S04E11	1	"Room 401"	Andrew Harmon	A night auditor at an inn has to contend with the eccentricities of a new guest.	David Cummings	David Cummings	David Cummings & Brandon Boone	May 10, 2014
S04E11	2	"Who Killed Sarah Cooper"	C.K. Walker	After finding the corpse of a little girl, a woman realizes she may know the identity of the killer.	Alexis Bristowe David Cummings	David Cummings	David Cummings & Brandon Boone	May 10, 2014
S04E11	3	"White Bones"	Anton Scheller	An archaeologist tries to figure out why a recently found collection of pristine bones continues to disappear night after night.	Sammy Raynor	David Cummings	David Cummings & Brandon Boone	May 10, 2014
S04E11	4	"Red Velvet Cake"	Alan Harasen	An elderly woman shares her recipe for red velvet cake with her daughter while engaging in other activities.	Susan Knowles	David Cummings	David Cummings & Brandon Boone	May 10, 2014
S04E11	5	"For the Glory of God"	Liam Hogan	While stopping at a restaurant in a small town, a man gets caught in the middle of an ancient battle between good and evil.	David Cummings Jessica McEvoy Brian Mansi	David Cummings	David Cummings & Brandon Boone	May 10, 2014
S04E11	6	"The Crawlers"	Chance Patrick	A man reflects on a story told to him by a childhood friend and whether or not it could've been true.	David Cummings	David Cummings	David Cummings & Brandon Boone	May 10, 2014
S04E12	1	"What Hurricane Sandy Uncovered"	Victor King	The day after Hurricane Sandy devastates the Northeastern U.S., a bartender in Connecticut has only one customer... a man who claims to be sixty years dead.	Peter Lewis David Cummings	David Cummings	David Cummings & Brandon Boone	December 10, 2014
S04E12	2	"A Childhood Memory"	Raymond Wolfgang	A man reflects on how much truth there are to memories - particularly a frightening experience he went through as a child.	Ben Williams Jessica McEvoy David Cummings	David Cummings	David Cummings & Brandon Boone	December 10, 2014
S04E12	3	"Charlie"	Ashlee Osborn	A woman shares the tragic story of her little brother, whose extraordinary powers of empathy proved to be more of a curse than a gift.	Jessica McEvoy	David Cummings	David Cummings & Brandon Boone	December 10, 2014
S04E12	4	"Ash Hollow"	R.J. Willis	A local man tells five strange and scary tales about his hometown, including a disappearing well, the horror of camping in the Ash Hollow woods, and a supposedly haunted library.	David Cummings	David Cummings	David Cummings & Brandon Boone	December 10, 2014
S04E13	1	"Ghosts of Nagasaki"	Ryan Marc	A man tells of his grandfather's traumatizing experiences as a soldier in WWII.	David Cummings	David Cummings	David Cummings & Brandon Boone	October 19, 2014
S04E13	2	"Fresh Luck to Its Owner"	Anton Scheller	A man's life changes (quite literally, in fact) when he comes to possess a unique wristwatch.	Tom Rosenzweig David Cummings	David Cummings	David Cummings & Brandon Boone	October 19, 2014
S04E13	3	"Find Her"	Brad Blackwell	A man is challenged to find his missing wife in a sadistic game of cat-and-mouse.	David Cummings	David Cummings	David Cummings & Brandon Boone	October 19, 2014
S04E13	4	"An Email I Should Never Have Received"	Shane Fliger	After seeing an email with terrifying implications, a man finds himself on the run for his life.	Peter Lewis David Cummings	David Cummings	David Cummings & Brandon Boone	October 19, 2014
S04E13	5	"You're Next"	V.S. Finlayson	A serial killer with a unique modus operandi proves to be the answer to an unhappily married man's problems.	David Cummings Jessica McEvoy	David Cummings	David Cummings & Brandon Boone	October 19, 2014
S04E13	6	"He Said His Wife Was Pregnant"	Annie Nichols	A girl believes the pressures of impending fatherhood are taking a lot out of one of her regular customers... but the truth is far more horrifying.	Corinne Sanders Jessica McEvoy David Cummings	David Cummings	David Cummings & Brandon Boone	October 19, 2014
S04E14	1	"Ditch or Die"	Maggie Louise	A dangerous game turns tragic for a group of friends.	Jessica McEvoy David Cummings	David Cummings	David Cummings & Brandon Boone	October 26, 2014
S04E14	2	"A Campfire Story"	Andrew MacDougall	A camp counselor's knowledge of local legends proves to be very useful to his troupe.	Alex Beal Jessica McEvoy, David Cummings	David Cummings	David Cummings & Brandon Boone	October 26, 2014
S04E14	3	"Dinosaur Bones"	M.C. Meggles	When a young woman befriends a little boy who lives next door to her, she makes a horrific discovery about why he likes to dig in the backyard.	Corinne Sanders David Cummings	David Cummings	David Cummings & Brandon Boone	October 26, 2014
S04E14	4	"Clown 4 Rent"	G.C. Remasque	A practically out-of-work party clown finds employment at a very different kind of party.	C.H. Williamson	David Cummings	David Cummings & Brandon Boone	October 26, 2014
S04E14	5	"Repressed Memories are Meant to Stay Dead"	C.K. Walker	A woman blocks out the traumatic memory of seeing her sister's murderer.	Susan Knowles	David Cummings	David Cummings & Brandon Boone	October 26, 2014
S04E14	6	"She'd Recently Lost a Child"	Jon Patrick	While treating a morbidly obese patient, a group of hospital workers make a horrible discovery.	Daniel Simon Jessica McEvoy, David Cummings	David Cummings	David Cummings & Brandon Boone	October 26, 2014
S04E14	7	"The Stump"	Ashley Franz Holzmann	An avid runner encounters a sadistic, malevolent creature while jogging in the woods.	David Cummings Jonathan Jones, Jessica McEvoy	David Cummings	David Cummings & Brandon Boone	October 26, 2014
S04E15 Halloween 2014	1	"The End of All Hallow's Eve"	Michael Whitehouse	A group of friends go out for what ends up being their final year of trick-or-treating.	David Ault	David Cummings	David Cummings & Brandon Boone	October 31, 2014
S04E15 Halloween 2014	2	"The Albino Farm"	John Jennings	A quartet of high school friends decide to spend their Halloween investigating a local farm with a sordid history... a history that they come to find isn't entirely untrue.	Peter Lewis Rima Chaddha Mycynek, David Cummings	David Cummings	David Cummings & Brandon Boone	October 31, 2014
S04E15 Halloween 2014	3	"It Doesn't Stop After Halloween"	Patrick Narvasa	While searching for Halloween costumes, a young boy and his friend find a series of videos that leaves them terrified beyond words.	Mike DelGaudio	David Cummings	David Cummings & Brandon Boone	October 31, 2014
S04E15 Halloween 2014	4	"Adrift"	T.W. Grim	A man shares the story of his friend's encounter with a shipwrecked sailor.	David Cummings	David Cummings	David Cummings & Brandon Boone	October 31, 2014
S04E15 Halloween 2014	5	"Bye Bye Love"	Christopher Bloodworth	A group of friends visit a local bar's strange haunted house, leading to a series of strange and disturbing events.	Peter Lewis Jessica McEvoy, David Cummings	David Cummings	David Cummings & Brandon Boone	October 31, 2014
S04E15 Halloween 2014	6	"Room 733"	C.K. Walker	Two longtime friends arrive at college and discover an evil presence in one of the rooms of their dorm.	Jessica McEvoy Rima Chaddha Mycynek, Alexis Bristowe, Susan Knowles, Corinne Sanders, David Cummings	David Cummings	David Cummings & Brandon Boone	October 31, 2014
S04E15a Halloween Hangover	1	"The White Face in the Window"	Nick Ledesma	After discovering a strange object in the woods, a man is haunted by a ghastly apparition.	Caden Von Clegg	David Cummings	David Cummings & Brandon Boone	November 9, 2014
S04E15a Halloween Hangover	2	"The Monkey's Paw"	W.W. Jacobs	NoSleep adapts W.W. Jacobs's classic horror story, in which a couple receive a monkey's paw from a friend who claims that it can grant them three wishes. These wishes, they soon find out, come at a horrible price...	Peter Bishop, David Lewis Richardson, Melissa Exelberth, David Alnwick, Jeff Clement	David Cummings	David Cummings	November 9, 2014
S04E16	1	"Pete the Moonshiner"	R.D. Ovenfriend	A man recalls a particularly frightening story he heard while spending the weekend at a friend's house... and the horrible truth behind the story he discovered years later.	Peter Lewis	David Cummings	David Cummings	November 16, 2014
S04E16	2	"A Story to Scare My Son"	R.D. Ovenfriend	A man decides to tell a cautionary tale about internet safety to his son. When the son requests that it be scary, the man obliges... but is it really a story...?	Peter Lewis	David Cummings	David Cummings	November 16, 2014
S04E16	3	"A Helping Hand"	Ryan Schwartz	A recovering alcoholic is approached by a strange man who tells him he "won't survive the night."	Alex Beal Jessica McEvoy, David Cummings	David Cummings	David Cummings	November 16, 2014
S04E16	4	"Don't Let Your Child See Your Fear"	Rayne Akhten	After a nasty bout with the flu, a woman's son is left with a permanent brain impairment... but it seems he has gained a certain power in return...	Jessica McEvoy	David Cummings	David Cummings	November 16, 2014

== Sleepless Tours ==
In October 2016, The NoSleep Podcast announced its "Sleepless Tour 2017”. The tour presented a series of 16 live shows across the continental US, featuring many of the popular voices from the show. In addition to publicity on Facebook, the tour was announced during an episode of the show. Another live event was undertaken in October 2017, with another live tour titled "Escape the Black Farm" following in March 2018.

In October 2019 a US-based Halloween tour was launched, ending at The Stanley Hotel on Halloween. In January 2020 the team toured the UK and Europe, with host David Cummings and most of the UK-based narrators.

== Awards ==
The NoSleep Podcast has won two Parsec awards and has been a finalist seven additional times. It is also a finalist for an Audio Verse Award.

- 2018 Parsec Award Finalist for Best Speculative Fiction Story: Small Cast (Short Form) for "What Happens When The Stars Go Out" by Jesse Clark.
- 2016 Audio Verse Award Finalist for Best Fan/Adaptation Production.
- 2015 Parsec Award Finalist for Best Speculative Fiction Magazine or Anthology Podcast.
- 2015 Parsec Award Finalist for Best Speculative Fiction Story: Small Cast (Short Form) for "A Story to Scare My Son" by R.D. Ovenfriend.
- 2015 Parsec Award Finalist for Best Speculative Fiction Story: Small Cast (Short Form) for "The Mummer Man" by Stan Studdens.
- Winner of the 2014 Parsec Award for Best Speculative Fiction Magazine or Anthology Podcast.
- 2014 Parsec Award Finalist for Best Speculative Fiction Story: Small Cast (Short Form) for A Christmas Feast by Michael Whitehouse.
- 2014 Parsec Award Finalist for Best Speculative Fiction Story: Small Cast (Short Form) for Just Another Night by Andrew MacDougall.
- Winner of the 2013 Parsec Award for Best New Speculative Fiction Podcaster/Team.
- 2013 Parsec Award Finalist for Best Speculative Fiction Magazine or Anthology Podcast.

== See also ==
- r/nosleep
- Horror podcast
- Tales From the Void
