= Marcus Kliewer =

Canadian writer

Marcus Kliewer is a Canadian writer of horror fiction, who won the Kobo Emerging Writer Prize in 2026 for his debut novel We Used to Live Here.

Originally from Kelowna, British Columbia, with family roots in Steinbach, Manitoba, he moved to Vancouver, British Columbia after high school and worked in the film industry in crew jobs and as a stop-motion animator. His most noted jobs as an animator were as an editor on Amanda Strong's 2018 short film Biidaaban (The Dawn Comes), and as director of the 2020 animated short film lot.

When film production was shut down by the COVID-19 pandemic, Kliewer received the Canada Emergency Response Benefit, and began to devote his free time to writing short horror fiction for the r/nosleep community on Reddit.

His original Reddit version of We Used to Live Here began to attract interest from Netflix in 2021, and was the winner of r/nosleep's Scariest Story of the Year award. He also scored a three-book deal, as well as a film development deal for his short story "The Caretaker".

We Used to Live Here was published in June 2024, and The Caretaker was published in April 2026.

Please Remain Seated, an audiobook version of three of his short stories, was released in September 2026.
