= Joan Samson =

American writer

- Born: September 9, 1937; Erie, Pennsylvania, U.S.
- Died: February 27, 1976 (aged 38); Cambridge, Massachusetts, U.S.
- Occupation: Writer
- Notable work: The Auctioneer

Joan Samson (September 9, 1937 – February 27, 1976) was an American writer. Her only published novel was The Auctioneer, published briefly before she died of brain cancer.

The Auctioneer, published in 1976 is described as a story that borders on horror, a story about how a community is torn apart by a single person. It has been translated to Spanish (editorial Ultramar-Spain, and editorial Emecé-Argentina, both in 1977), Dutch, Italian and recently to Catalan, Polish and French. It is considered one of the best-selling horror novels of the 1970s, selling over a million copies.

== Works ==
- Watching the New Baby (1974)
- The Auctioneer (New York: Simon and Schuster), 1976; Valancourt, 2020
