= Tales from the Void =

Canadian horror anthology television series

- Release poster
- Genre: Horror; Anthology
- Created by: Francesco Loschiavo
- Based on: r/nosleep stories
- Showrunners: Francesco Loschiavo; John Thomas Kelley
- Written by: Francesco Loschiavo; John Thomas Kelley; Tricia Lee
- Directed by: Joe Lynch; Toby Poser; John Adams; Maritte Lee Go; Francesco Loschiavo
- Country of origin: Canada
- Original language: English
- No. of seasons: 1
- No. of episodes: 6

Production
- Executive producers: Aaron B. Koontz; David Cummings; Brad Miska; Brandon Hill
- Producers: Barclay J. Maude; Rebeka Herron; Martin Wotjunik
- Running time: 32 minutes
- Production companies: Envoi Entertainment; Paper Street Pictures; Blood Oath; Cineverse

Original release
- Network: Screambox
- Release: October 13 – October 27, 2024

Tales from the Void is a Canadian horror anthology television series created by Francesco Loschiavo and executive produced by Aaron B. Koontz. The series features adaptations of stories posted on the r/nosleep subreddit, and premiered on Screambox on October 13, 2024.

Episodes were directed by horror genre veterans, including Joe Lynch, Toby Poser & John Adams, Maritte Lee Go, and Loschiavo himself, while the showrunners on the series were Loschiavo and John Thomas Kelley.

== Episodes ==
List of Episodes
No.	Title	Directed by	Written by	Release date
1	Into The Unknown	Joe Lynch	Written by: Francesco Loschiavo Based on the short story “The Black Square” by: Matthew Dymerski	October 13, 2024
2	Fixed Frequency	Francesco Loschiavo	Written by: John Thomas Kelley Based on the short story by: Manen Lyset	October 13, 2024
3	Starlight	Francesco Loschiavo	Written by: John Thomas Kelley Based on the short story by: Joao Ribeiro	October 20, 2024
4	Carry	Maritte Lee Go	Written by: Tricia Lee Based on the short story by: Grayson Grume	October 20, 2024
5	Plastic Smile	John Adams & Toby Poser	Written by: Francesco Loschiavo Based on the short story by: Rebecca Klingel	October 27, 2024
6	Whistle in the Woods	Francesco Loschiavo	Written by: John Thomas Kelley Based on the short story by: Travis Brown	October 27, 2024

== Production ==
=== Development ===
On July 29, 2020, it was announced that the series was invited to the virtual IFP Week 2020 as part of the Narrative Series slate to help further project development and funding. Later, in November 2020, the series received the Independent Production Fund short-form series production funding. In April 2024, additional funding was received from the Northern Ontario Heritage Fund, which brought the production to Sault Ste. Marie.

=== Filming ===
Principal photography occurred during 2023 and 2024 in Sault Ste. Marie and Whitchurch-Stouffville, Ontario.

== Release ==
Episodes of the series played at a number of festivals across the globe, including Panic Fest, Fantasia International Film Festival, GrimmFest, Brooklyn Horror Film Festival, FilmQuest, SXSW Sydney, Terror in the Bay, and Vancouver Horror Show.

Episodes were released in the United States on Screambox beginning on October 13, 2024, with two episodes released weekly through October 27, 2024. In Canada, episodes premiered the day following their US premiere, beginning on October 14, 2024, on Super Channel / Fuse, with a full series marathon occurring on Halloween Night 2024.
