= List of horror podcasts =

The following is a list of horror podcasts, which vary in style of delivery.

== List ==
Podcast	Year	Credits	Produced by	Ref
REDACTED	2025–present	Athan and Jamie Petronis	Hush Studios	
SOMNARIUM.	2026–Present	Olivier Van Beeck	Haunted House Studios	
3 Basket Cases	2025–Present	Frank, Jay, and Peter	The Brink of Sanity	
Campfire Radio Theater	2011–present	John Ballentine	Independent	
Dark Sanctum	2022-2024	Mark Ramsay and Jeff Schmidt	Wondery+	
Development Hell	2020–Present	Josh Korngut	DREAD Podcast Network	
2 Guys and a Chainsaw	2015–present	Todd Kuhns and Craig Higgins	red40 entertainment	
Archive 81	2016–2019	Marc Sollinger and Dan Powell	Dead Signals	
Knifepoint Horror	2010–present	Soren Narnia	Independent	
Ghost Tape	2020	Nia DaCosta, Aron Eli Coleite, Kiersey Clemons, and Alexandra E Hartman	QCODE	
Welcome to Nightvale	2012–present	Joseph Fink and Jeffrey Cranor	Night Vale Presents	
Lore	2015–present	Aaron Mahnke	Grim & Mild	
The Magnus Archives	2016–2021	Jonathan Sims and Alexander J Newall	Rusty Quill	
The White Vault	2017–present	Travis Vengroff & K. A. Statz	Fool and Scholar Productions	
Dark Dice	2018–present	Travis Vengroff & K. A. Statz	Fool and Scholar Productions	
Old Gods of Appalachia	2020–present	Cam Collins & Steve Shell	Deep Nerd Media	
The Last Podcast on the Left	2011–present	Ben Kissel, Marcus Parks, and Henry Zebrowski	The Last Podcast Network	
Nightmare on Film Street	2016–present	Kimberley Elizabeth and Jonathan Dehaan	Nightmare on Film Street	
Dead for Filth	2017–2020	Michael Varrati	June Gloom Productions and REVRY Studios	
Unwell	2019–present	Jim McDoniel and Jeffrey Nils Gardner	HartLife NFP	
Unexplained	2016–present	Richard MacLean Smith	AV Club Productions LTD	
The Boo Crew	2017–present	Leone D'Antonio, Trevor Shand, and Lauren Shand	Bloody Disgusting Podcast Network	
The Castle of Horror	2011–present	Jason Henderson		
Small Town Horror	2016–2019	Jon Grilz		
The No Sleep Podcast	2011–present	David Cummings	Creative Reason Media Inc	
Horror Hill	2018–present	Jason Hill, Erik Peabody	Simple Scary Podcasts Network	
The SCP Archive		Jon Grilz & Pacific Obadiah	Midnight Disease Productions	
Tanis	2015–present	Terry Miles	Public Radio Alliance	
The Black Tapes	2015–2020	Terry Miles and Paul Bae	Pacific Northwest Stories	
The Last Movie	2018–2020	Terry Miles	Public Radio Alliance	
Limetown	2015–2021	Annie-Sage Whitehurst	Two-Up	
The Darkest Night	2016–2018	Lee Pace	The Paragon Collective	
The Horror of Dolores Roach	2018–2019	Daphne Rubin-Vega and Bobby Cannavale	Gimlet Media	
Let's Not Meet: A True Horror Podcast	2019–present	Andrew Tate	Cryptic County	
Alice Isn't Dead	2016–2018	Joseph Fink, Jasika Nicole, Erica Livingston, and Roberta Colindrez	Night Vale Presents	
Casualty Friday	2019–present	Kane Hodder, Tiffany Shepis, and Felissa Rose	Casualty Friday	
The Gaylords of Darkness podcast	2018–present	Stacie Ponder and Anthony Hudson	Independent	
Pulp! From Beyond the Veil	2018–present	Cody Sullivan	Riverpower Podcast Mill	
Drunk in a Graveyard	2017–present	Robin Goodfellow and Scott Floronic	Independent	
Ghost Town	2018–present	Jason Horton and Rebecca Leib	Studio71	
Killer POV	2013–2016	Rebekah McKendry, Rob G. and Elric Kane	GeekNation.com	
Random Horror Podcast No. 9				
Afro Horror	2019–present		Best Sellers Productions	
The Shadow Diaries	2020–present	Kara Hayward and Madelaine Petsch	Studio71 & Snarled	
Exile and Teen Creeps				
My Neighbors Are Dead	2017–present	Adam Peacock	Nate DuFort, Adam Peacock	
Halloweenies	2018–present	Justin Gerber, Mike Vanderbilt, Dan Caffrey, McKenzie Gerber, and Michael Roffman	Bloody Disgusting Podcast Network	
Borrasca	2020	Rebecca Klingel and Cole Sprouse	QCODE	
Dirty Little Horror	2018–present	Charles Rockhill and Christopher Downs	Independent	
Bubble				
The Vault of Horror	2020		EC Comics and Pocket Universe Productions	
The Narrow Caves	2018	Vincent D'Onofrio, Will Patton, Lili Simmons and Wyatt Russell	Fangoria and Audioboom	
Origins Unknown	2021–present	Claire and Chris	Independent	
Dead Air: A Horror Podcast	2020–present		Big Baby Studios and Playground Inc.	
Within the Wires	2016–present	Mona Grenne, Jeffrey Cranor, Janina Matthewson, and Mary Epworth	Night Vale Presents	
Homecoming	2016–2018	Catherine Keener, Oscar Isaac, David Schwimmer, David Cross, Amy Sedaris, Michael Cera, Mercedes Ruehl, Alia Shawkat, Chris Gethard, and Spike Jonze	Gimlet Media	
Lake Clarity	2017–2020		Midnight Disease Productions	
Return Home	2016–2020	Jeff Heimbuch	Bamfer Productions	
Rabbits	2017–present	Carly Parker, Terry Miles, Nic Silver, and Hollis Adams Lane	Public Radio Alliance	
The Message	2015		GE Podcast Theater / Panoply / The Message	
Life After	2016–2017		GE Podcast Theater / Panoply / The Message	
The Lost Cat Podcast	2014–present	A. P. Clarke	Independent	
Point Mystic	2016–2020	Christopher Reynaga and Marguerite Croft	October Isle	
Inside the Exorcist	2017–2021		Wondery	
Spooked	2017–Present	Glynn Washington	Snap Judgment and WNYC Studios	
Ain't Slayed Nobody	2020–Present	Corbin Cupp	Rusty Quill	
Shock Waves				
The Apex & The Abyss				
Creepy		Jon Grilz	Bloody Disgusting Podcast Network	
Switchblade Sisters				
Horror Queers Podcast	2019–present	Joe Lipsett and Trace Thurman	Bloody Disgusting Podcast Network	
Halloween in Hell				
Valentine's Day in Hell				

== See also ==
- Horror podcast
