= Thirteen Storeys =

2020 novel by Jonathan Sims

Thirteen Storeys is a novel by Jonathan Sims published in 2020.

== Premise ==
Thirteen Storeys is a haunted house story. It is set in Banyan Court, a large apartment building that is split between high-end luxury flats and low-income housing. Each chapter focuses on a different resident, including a little girl with a strange imaginary friend, an art collector with a hypnotic painting, and a concierge with an unusually violent coworker. Each chapter ends with its respective character receiving an invitation to meet the building's mysterious owner, Tobias Fell.

== Publication history ==
Thirteen Storeys was the debut novel by Jonathan Sims, who was already known as the author of, and voice actor for, The Magnus Archives horror podcast.

Sims signed the world rights to two of his new novels to Gollancz in 2024, and his two previous novels, Thirteen Storeys and Family Business were made available from Gollancz.

== Reception ==
Eric Brown for The Guardian said that "Jonathan Sims is known as creator and presenter of The Magnus Archives, a podcast relating the exploits of a fictional paranormal institute. As might be expected from someone who has been terrifying listeners for years, his first novel, Thirteen Storeys (Gollancz, 16.99), combines a creeping sense of unease with all-out gore.

James Lovegrove for Financial Times said that "Jonathan Sims's haunted house tale Thirteen Storeys (Gollancz, £16.99) is as sombre as they come. The dwelling in question is Banyan Court, a development in Tower Hamlets built by rapacious billionaire Tobias Fell, who now lives as a recluse in its penthouse apartment. One by one we meet a varied selection of residents, each of them experiencing menacing apparitions. Their individual stories all end the same way, with a dinner invitation from Fell, and the final chapter details events of that meal as the guests assemble for a blood-soaked denouement. Sims has a good grasp for how to generate unease — the sense of things going unaccountably awry, or happening at the periphery of one's understanding, or being just plain wrong — and builds up the oppressive atmosphere within Banyan Court skilfully. The novel's climax, if a little exposition-heavy, nonetheless draws together the threads of the preceding chapters with aplomb and delivers a cathartic pay-off after the long, slow accumulation of dread."

David Pitt for Winnipeg Free Press said that "Jonathan Sims' Thirteen Storeys (Gollancz, 400 pages, $18) is a genuinely frightening horror story. A reclusive billionaire is holding a dinner party, and he's invited several of the tenants of an apartment complex to his penthouse suite. But here's the thing: none of these people know each other. They do, though, have something in common: at one time or another, each of them has had a bizarre experience in this old, odd building. In Sims' hands, the apartment complex becomes another character in the story: possibly malevolent, certainly disturbing, always doing something unexpected. The pace, too, is exquisite, as the author steadily ramps up the characters' fears and our own sense that something awful is going to happen. And the ending: pure, unadulterated terror. A must-read for horror fans."
