= Knifepoint Horror =

Supernatural suspense podcast

- Genre: Horror; thriller; science fiction; weird fiction; black comedy
- Language: English

Creative team
- Written by: Soren Narnia

Cast and voices
- Hosted by: Soren Narnia
- Narrated by: Soren Narnia; Dennis Smith; Mike Vendetti; Peter Yearsley; Mark Nelson; Markham Anderson; Brian D'eon; Mike Harris; Logan Masterson; Neil Donnelly; Jason Hill

Music
- Theme music composed by: Kevin MacLeod

Production
- Production: Soren Narnia
- Length: 40–70 Minutes

Publication
- No. of seasons: 1
- No. of episodes: 121
- Original release: November 23, 2010
- Provider: Independent
- Updates: Monthly
- License: CC BY-NC-SA.

Related
- Related shows: The NoSleep Podcast; Welcome to Night Vale; Alice Isn't Dead; Limetown
- Website: knifepointhorror.libsyn.com

Knifepoint Horror is a supernatural suspense podcast created, written, and produced by Soren Narnia. Its sporadically-uploaded episodes, which average nearly an hour in length, feature first-person narrations (often by Narnia himself) and are notable for their highly minimalist production, especially in their use of sound effects and music.

== About ==
The podcast premiered on November 23, 2010, with the story "town". In a departure from the format it later adopted, the story was narrated by voice actor Dennis Smith instead of Narnia.

The featured stories are listed under Creative Commons Attribution-NonCommercial-ShareAlike CC BY-NC-SA.

The show took an extended hiatus starting in February 2012, causing some of Narnia's fellow podcasters to theorize it had been canceled due to a lack of updates. However, it returned in June 2013 and has retained a consistent upload schedule since.

The podcast's cover art is a detail of a demon from the third section of Hieronymus Bosch's medieval triptych The Garden of Earthly Delights. In the description of the episode "A Quick Trilogy of Terror", Narnia featured a short, humorous story written by 11-year-old fan Ethien Duckett explaining the fictional origins of the creature, dubbing it the "Ratbat".

== Format ==
"staircase", one of Knifepoint Horror's most well-known episodes. (29:51)

Using "the limitations of audio as a strength", each Knifepoint Horror episode typically features a single standalone horror story, narrated by Narnia, with minimal music, sound effects, and background noise. The narration is done from a first-person point of view. The title of each story is usually a single, lowercase word such as "staircase", "laborer", "school", or "corpse". Occasionally, titles will include uppercase letters or feature more than one word, signaling the appearance of more than one narrator and increased music and sound effects. These include "The Crack", "Twelve Tiny Cabins", and "Let No One Walk Beside Her".

=== Influences ===
In an interview with jupitercutter, Narnia listed works such as Dracula, "The Monkey's Paw" and "The Yellow Wallpaper", as well as the works of authors such as Joyce Carol Oates, H. P. Lovecraft, Stephen King, M. R. James, Ray Bradbury and Clive Barker as being influential on his style of writing. In the same interview, he also singled out William Friedkin's 1973 adaptation of The Exorcist as being "the biggest single influence on me when it comes to horror. Watching that revealed to me at age 10, when it came on TV one night, that if you want a horror story to be truly frightening, you have to make it seem like you believe it all happened, presenting it with total sincerity and rationality."

=== Music ===
The podcast uses royalty-free music by Kevin MacLeod. Emma Fradd from the Australian Dance Pop Band Heaps Good Friends has also provided music for some episodes, as well as voice acting in the short story 'Is It That Time Again?' featured in A Compendium for Halloween& D.N.K.

== List of episodes ==
All episodes are written and narrated by Soren Narnia, except where noted.

| No. | Title | Original release date | Running time |
|---|---|---|---|
| 1 | "town" | November 23, 2010 | 53:56 |
An unwitting videographer is drawn into a mysterious researcher's day-long journey through a small place on the brink of total possession. Note: Narrated by Dennis Smith.
| 2 | "corpse" | November 25, 2010 | 13:12 |
The corpse of a remorseless killer refuses to decay, breaking the sanity of a dangerous man who becomes obsessed with it. Note: Narrated by Mike Vendetti.
| 3 | "cult" | November 25, 2010 | 19:12 |
A cult's act of human sacrifice and resurrection reaches across the twentieth century to leave its imprint on a modern day murder. Note: Narrated by Peter Yearsley.
| 4 | "eyes" | November 29, 2010 | 26:09 |
An invitation to a séance leads a Congressman to face the wrath of a tortured spirit bent on making him suffer for a past betrayal. Note: Narrated by Mark Nelson.
| 5 | "trail" | December 2, 2010 | 18:38 |
A courteous stranger offers three friends looking for a Halloween hayride into the woods something deeper and darker. Note: Narrated by Markham Anderson.
| 6 | "school" | December 5, 2010 | 50:18 |
A damaged man recalls his time at Seacrist Elementary, the unlikely site of a hideous paranormal outbreak which still haunts him two decades later.
| 7 | "rehearsal" | December 9, 2010 | 7:34 |
One of the most famous political assassinations in history may have been cryptically--and gruesomely--foretold. Note: Narrated by Brian d'Eon.
| 8 | "plague" | December 12, 2010 | 24:24 |
Few considered the strange substance which spread through a small city to be anything more than a nuisance until the truth brought bloody horror to the entire world. Note: Narrated by Mike Harris.
| 9 | "return" | December 17, 2010 | 23:14 |
The inability of two troubled teens to extricate themselves from the influence of a practitioner of witchcraft costs them everything as adults. Note: Narrated by Markham Anderson.
| 10 | "tunnel" | December 22, 2010 | 17:04 |
Nine seconds was all it took to scar a subway rider for life when the flickering subterranean lights showed him the unimaginable. Note: Narrated by Logan Masterson.
| 11 | "possession" | December 26, 2010 | 88:20 |
A man's slow descent into depression and addiction opens up a world of once-hidden terrors, the worst of which awaits in a malevolent ghost's plan to devour his weakened soul.
| 12 | "house" | December 30, 2010 | 54:26 |
On a dark winter's night, a seeker of ghosts attuned to the strange energy within a remote haunted house underestimates its inhabitants' power to destroy. Note: Narrated by Dennis Smith.
| 13 | "cabin - from the files of Savid Doud" | January 2, 2011 | 6:17 |
In a previous episode, 'house', the psychic researcher Aramis Churchton makes reference to the notes his colleague Savid Doud has made concerning cases for potential investigation. Here is one of Doud's original audio recordings, recovered after his death, describing such a case of paranormal phenomena. Note: Narrated by Neil Donnelley.
| 14 | "desert - from the files of Savid Doud" | January 2, 2011 | 8:18 |
In a previous episode, 'house', the psychic researcher Aramis Churchton makes reference to the notes his colleague Savid Doud has made concerning cases for potential investigation. Here is one of Doud's original audio recordings, recovered after his death, describing such a case of paranormal phenomena. Note: Narrated by Neil Donnelley.
| 15 | "rebirth" | August 16, 2011 | 42:09 |
A nighttime expedition to a sleepy town uncovers the truth behind seemingly groundless rumors.
| 16 | "visitation" | September 23, 2011 | 29:04 |
A knock at the door in the dead of night begins a mystery involving a gruesome crime and a vengeance that can only come in the beyond.
| 17 | "sounds" | October 30, 2011 | 38:25 |
Two fugitives desperate to escape both the police and the elements become aware of a far greater horror lying between them and safety.
| 18 | "outcast" | December 4, 2011 | 66:58 |
Whether high school student Garrett Markish was truly evil or under the influence of forces he could not overcome did not matter to those who fell before his seething wrath.
| 19 | "undead" | January 17, 2012 | 39:11 |
A brief history of a brilliant creator slowly becomes a tale of shadows, footsteps, and terror when an awful irony reaches out to him with cold, lifeless hands.
| 20 | "sisters" | February 24, 2012 | 53:45 |
The secluded castle, once rumored to harbor evil, had been redeemed by the influence of piety and innocence until something came through the forest to return it to true darkness.
| 21 | "A Quick Trilogy of Terror" | June 21, 2013 | 92:59 |
Something a little shy of Knifepoint Horror, but perhaps entertaining in their own way, here are three stories that don't quite fit into the mold of those previously offered. Note: The individual stories in this episode are titled "mountains", "castle", and "solitude".
| 22 | "A Second Quick Trilogy of Terror" | October 8, 2013 | 71:14 |
Another three tales roughly and tersely told. Note: The individual stories in this episode are titled "bells", "lighthouse", and "army".
| 23 | "proof" | January 11, 2014 | 29:48 |
The unexpected phone call's origin raised many questions, but for a man anxious to discover real evidence of mysterious forces at work all around us, there was little question a journey was to be made.
| 24 | "retaliation" | January 21, 2014 | 30:13 |
A cruel game of psychological brinksmanship among thieves breaks the sanity of its most dangerous competitor.
| 25 | "presence" | March 19, 2014 | 24:48 |
Very few people had ever even heard of the Poldrict House, let alone investigated it. Surely the lack of fascination within the paranormal community was justified...
| 26 | "vision" | October 17, 2014 | 49:58 |
A man attempting to solve a strange gap in his memory meets a man claiming to offer an answer--one too frightening for mere mortals to grasp.
| 27 | "lake" | December 5, 2014 | 16:47 |
Some places are so remote that just to explore them is an invitation to the phantoms that know we're alone.
| 28 | "legend" | January 1, 2015 | 36:43 |
A tale made specifically for the campfire--a simple tale of the woods, long-buried secrets, and letting chances to escape terror slip agonizingly away.
| 29 | "staircase" | February 12, 2015 | 29:51 |
A comfortable suburban existence begins to fracture with a single sound. You may have heard it sometime yourself, but those who have surely possess no need for stories like these to haunt them.
| 30 | "bargain" | April 3, 2015 | 26:33 |
It seemed like such a simple deal, but it felt wrong from the very beginning--and led to a glimpse of a horror which, for those with even a little experience peering into the shadows, need not be named.
| 31 | "sleep" | June 1, 2015 | 37:53 |
There exists in this life a very real, horrifying phenomenon that science cannot yet extinguish. It strikes a surprising number of people, and none of us are safe. And if it comes for you, it will come at the most vulnerable moment you will ever know.
| 32 | "landmark" | July 19, 2015 | 44:39 |
Somewhere near your house it stands, one of those decaying places that people always whisper about as they pass by. For every day you age, it seems to age three. But it may well live beyond you, silently daring you each night at dusk to enter, coldly confident you'll always be too afraid.
| 33 | "chasm" | September 11, 2015 | 32:25 |
In the space of minutes, a travel writer venturing alone in remote waters goes from a state of enviable tranquility to blinding terror.
| 34 | "guest" | October 29, 2015 | 39:41 |
He was a teenager who suddenly had no place to sleep, no money, and no options. The world had quickly become a very scary place ... and then shelter appeared much too conveniently.
| 35 | "fields" | January 22, 2016 | 94:37 |
The next time you take a long country drive, look to your left and right as the scenery rolls by, the forgotten places where no footsteps tread for weeks, months, maybe years at a time. How long would it be before anyone noticed that such a place had become shelter for something unspeakable?
| 36 | "Let No One Walk Beside Her" | December 10, 2016 | 45:03 |
Here's a horror tale told through a different format. In a mysterious, undefined era, a desperate foot journey traverses a winter wilderness that promises a lonely death--perhaps a natural one, but likely not. Note: Features additional narration by Kalem Murray, Teddy Ray Bullard, Melinda Kordich, and Jason Hill.
| 37 | "A Quick Decology of Terror" | April 4, 2017 | 122:18 |
These 10 stories were produced as videos for YouTube over the past year as a slight change of pace--here they are, if you haven't heard them yet, in audio-only format as a convenience to those (like me, actually) who prefer to do without the creaky visuals. Some have been partially re-recorded. Note: The individual stories in this episode are titled "boardwalk", "forest", "highway", "cellar", "hiker", "car", "doppelganger", "graffiti", "hometown", and "photographs".
| 38 | "attic" | May 17, 2017 | 25:20 |
A conflict in memory between two brothers leads to a return to a place where childhood may have been hiding something too ghastly to retain in the mind.
| 39 | "mother" | June 29, 2017 | 33:36 |
Built as a place of solace for those who could no longer fully fend for themselves, the house should never have been disturbed or even noticed. But then one summer night, unfamiliar footsteps approached.
| 40 | "tarp" | August 16, 2017 | 28:41 |
A boy growing up in post-Depression Kansas learns there are no truly innocuous objects as long as the human imagination can infuse them with fearsome properties.
| 41 | "Four for Halloween" | October 13, 2017 | 73:57 |
Two tales of Knifepoint Horror, and two radio plays. Note: The individual stories in this episode are titled "thrifting", "Report on an Unidentified Space Station", "west", and "The Cleaver". "Report on an Unidentified Space Station" features additional narration by Jason Hill, while "The Cleaver" features additional narration by Ariel Alexa Sullivan, Amy Paonessa, Teddy Ray Bullard, Kalem Murray, Susan Wallace, Brian Lillie, and Justy Gee.
| 42 | "moonkeeper" | November 12, 2017 | 46:39 |
A man thrust onto the streets must navigate their disturbing sights and sounds, all the while living under the threat of a monster moving relentlessly through their shadows.
| 43 | "family" | January 24, 2018 | 62:39 |
For the haunted, any calm explanation of a supernatural phenomenon is a comforting one, no matter where it comes from. But it is never more important than in that very moment to remain watchful and mistrusting.
| 44 | "The Crack" | March 29, 2018 | 61:52 |
Another tale of lands touched by both enigmatic beauty and dormant, uncategorizable cruelty. Note: Features additional narration by Justy Gee, Jes Echo, Amy Paonessa, Cal Butera, Susan Wallace, and Brian Lillie. The poetry in this story was written by Mia LeBemay, marking the only time thus far a story features writing contributions by another author besides Narnia.
| 45 | "impound" | June 11, 2018 | 61:17 |
A man in trouble, wanting only an escape from a crisis, stumbles across a mystery which leads to another... and yet another, demanding a return to a dangerous place and time.
| 46 | "circles" | July 25, 2018 | 49:04 |
Maybe your own town holds one: a folk tale, discredited and in many ways absurd, that nevertheless will not die. Here is a glimpse into one such tale ... and the rare destructive force it happened to carry with it.
| 47 | "elements" | October 24, 2018 | 75:06 |
A man blinded by infatuation learns the object of his desire has intentions to become something from which he may have already missed his chance to escape. Note: Features additional narration by Amy Paonessa. This is the first lowercase-titled episode to feature narration by more than one voice actor.
| 48 | "The Copper Cup" | April 8, 2019 | 60:58 |
A man who insists on the existence of a relative no one else has ever seen delves dangerously into the swirling fog of his own youthful perceptions. Note: Features additional narration by Currer Hathaway.
| 49 | "transit" | June 3, 2019 | 35:13 |
Memories of three weird occurrences that cannot be explained merge for their living witness into a common theme.
| 50 | "laborer" | August 2, 2019 | 41:01 |
Nothing that has four walls and a roof can be eliminated as a possible breeding ground for the supernatural -- nothing.
| 51 | "Three for Halloween" | October 3, 2019 | 52:26 |
The featured story of this brief trilogy imagines that perhaps, Earth's final confrontation between good and evil will take place so quietly you'll be able to hear a caterpillar crawl through the blood-soaked grass. Before this tale comes an appetizer ... and afterward, a little dessert. Note: The individual stories in this episode are titled "dusk", "extremity", and "project". "extremity" features additional narration by Linda Wojtowick.
| 52 | "The Lockbox" | December 21, 2019 | 72:35 |
For the people in a small town in upstate New York, what happened was just another sordid true crime story. But they would never know just how frightening and surreal things became in its aftermath, or what one woman chose to endure in the name of compassion. Note: Features additional narration by Eric Dantley, Linda Wojtowick, Jamie Molina, Julie Medina, Les Lentz, Amy Newman, Corey Landis, Maureen Rivers, Currer Hathaway, Stuart Arnheim, Effi T. Mothgil, Catherine Saraceno, Cal Butera, and Ebenezer Alasi.
| 53 | "Twelve Tiny Cabins" | April 10, 2020 | 45:55 |
A college professor has a mysterious story to tell to a prized student, but his timing and motive are no less cryptic. Note: Features additional narration by Amy Paonessa, Linda Wojtowick, Elena Vegam, and Cal Butera.
| 54 | "compulsion" | June 7, 2020 | 46:01 |
Conflicting feelings about a banished relative lead to a visit a long time in coming … but each step toward her house reveals more warning signs. Note: Features additional narration by Hugh Pierce and Reginald Baskerville.
| 55 | "drop-ins" | July 8, 2020 | 30:00 |
Each nighttime visitor to the tiny house in the country was more unwelcome than the one before ... but the fourth was truly unimaginable. Note: Features a song performed by Emma Fradd.
| 56 | "excursion" | August 7, 2020 | 51:55 |
'What about the forest where this terrible thing happened?' people sometimes ask when they hear the story of the small town that became so precariously balanced between true evil and unexpected hope. 'Is it still there?' The answer is yes... the forest is still there. Note: Features additional narration by Catherine Saraceno.
| 57 | "occupiers" | October 3, 2020 | 50:17 |
The letters and diaries of several 19th century soldiers allude to “the terrible Demon of Moscow” that once haunted the city's streets. One witness alone told the entire story of the ghostly force most still believe was not truly of this world.
| 58 | "thresholds" | October 16, 2020 | 30:23 |
For Halloween, a tale of two people dwelling among the monsters who own the night.
| 59 | "vacancy" | December 3, 2020 | 35:46 |
Within every grandiose scheme, there lies the seed of possible disaster. Some of these disasters are loud, chaotic, and violent ... but sometimes they only sound like the wind sighing through haunted ruins.
| 60 | "digs" | February 15, 2021 | 28:28 |
What's the shortest time you've ever lived somewhere before you left in frustration? What was the problem—bad neighbors, leaks, noise problems, lousy plumbing? Something worse? Something mystifying? Note: Features additional narration by Benjamin Gilmour.
| 61 | "A Convergence in Wintertime" | May 10, 2021 | 57:07 |
Someday, when you find yourself alone in a place like the one where this story occurred, take note of what happens to your footprints as the minutes tick by. As one of the narrators claims, the wind shifts things around fast--and it's as if no trace of you ever existed. Note: Features additional narration by Ebenezer Alasi, Amy Paonessa, Currer Hathaway, Reginald Baskerville, and Linda Wojtowick.
| 62 | "prisoner" | July 9, 2021 | 28:45 |
There is a curious fact about the tiny railway station mentioned by the teller of this story that he would never know: Almost sixty years before the events he describes, the station was partially demolished in the night by someone or something unknown, and had to be rebuilt from the ground up. Unknown, yes, but there were indeed whispers--from the older folk mostly, people long dead by the time the weary and hungry narrator appeared in the mountains utterly by chance.
| 63 | "I Was Called Anwen" | September 24, 2021 | 67:05 |
A documentarian's celebrity puff piece takes a dark turn when her subject reveals the story of a friend's haunting. Note: Features additional narration by Mig Windows.
| 64 | "attraction" | October 1, 2021 | 49:07 |
You are invited to a place in the mountains where one man decided that no matter what the date, it will always, always be Halloween night. Note: An additional story, "sugary", appears at the end of this episode.
| 65 | "surveillance" | December 6, 2021 | 24:26 |
The tomb would soon sit unnoticed, perhaps forever, in the wild grass of the lonely cemetery. But on its first night of occupancy, one man would keep a careful watch over it. Just in case. Note: Features additional narration by Hugh Pierce.
| 66 | "The Smoke Child" | February 6, 2022 | 88:22 |
No one in attendance at the talk on that December night in New England, 2021, really knew what they would hear from the presenter, though they certainly knew his name. And while no video exists of his methodical dissection of the past, the audio recording alone seems more than enough. Note: Features additional narration by Robert Cantelmo and Beth Abdallah.
| 67 | "pride" | April 22, 2022 | 93:09 |
Many is the band that wishes they could have a second chance at what turned out to be their final performance—maybe they could have brought more energy to that night, or savored it just a little more... and then there's the terrible but unforgettable case of the celebrated rock group Waters Blue and Permanent (2003-2022).
| 68 | "D.N.K." | July 15, 2022 | 69:15 |
A filmmaker recalls the details of his darkest project: the people who endured it, the illusions he lost to it, and the horrific force that set it all in motion. Note: Features additional narration by John Jorgenson, Corey Nelson, Beth Abdallah, Teddy Ray Bullard, Linda Wojtowick, Mig Windows, Dana Bolton, Isabelle Humbert, Naomi Azran, and Emma Fradd.
| 69 | "cleanse" | August 21, 2022 | 32:22 |
There are reliable narrators, there are unreliable narrators… and then there are outliers like the one heard here. 'Clearly guilty of murder, he somehow remains committed to his narrative,' one journalist wrote of him. 'I wasn't sure whether to look at him with a strange kind of awe, or simply run screaming and never look back.' Note: Features additional narration by Amy Paonessa.
| 70 | "A Compendium for Halloween" | October 1, 2022 | 76:08 |
Eight very different stories for the season. Note: The individual stories in this episode are titled "hitcher", "Is It That Time Again?", "prodigal", "panophobe", "legalese", "contestants", "A Bitter Pill", and "blueberries". "Is It That Time Again?" features additional narration by Emma Fradd and Beth Abdallah, while "A Bitter Pill" features additional narration from Abdallah and Currer Hathaway.
| 71 | "colony" | November 7, 2022 | 105:31 |
Year by year, step by quiet step, a well-intentioned collective of great minds evolves into something to be feared.
| 72 | "gifters" | December 6, 2022 | 116:18 |
As a small town struggles to defend itself against cruel interlopers, the hour of vengeance draws ever closer.
| 73 | "hole" | January 17, 2023 | 45:31 |
Things were already tense inside a house in the middle of nowhere, and then at the wrong moment, there was a casual glimpse out the living room window.
| 74 | "Late Checkout" | March 17, 2023 | 28:06 |
In the world of short-term rentals, the personalities bound to the transaction sometimes briefly clash. Ninety-nine percent of the time, there's not enough there for anything to seriously ignite. The one percent is called 418 Ulmus Street. Note: Features additional narration by Currer Hathaway.
| 75 | "bots" | April 10, 2023 | 110:49 |
The story of Joel and Sammie, a young couple suddenly divided by something terrifying—and then bonded more strongly against a bizarre and inscrutable enemy. Note: Features additional narration by Caity Roberts and Robert Cantelmo.
| 76 | "rink" | May 19, 2023 | 60:33 |
In a suspiciously quiet and unspoiled setting, three friends are beckoned by the liberation found within their darkest impulses.
| 77 | "endgame" | June 11, 2023 | 55:58 |
For sale by Baltimore County: 3 BR, 2 BA single family dwelling on 1/3rd acre in residential section of Seven Bells, Maryland. Demolition arrangements offered by county at no cost to buyer. Strict confidentiality agreement must be signed by all interested parties before property is viewed or terms discussed. Note: Features additional narration by Frank Schumpert, Amy Paonessa, Richard Werner, and Corey Nelson.
| 78 | "sideswipe" | August 24, 2023 | 42:01 |
There's usually a moment as you drive alone late at night on a long, desolate country road when you succumb to a brief bleak thought of all that can happen to you out there. Maybe you become nervous about your sudden total dependence on your machine to get you safely back to the world of light. And maybe your surroundings start to seem genuinely scary. This is a story for those who start feeling these things the very first second that road begins to curve out of sight.
| 79 | "chains" | September 25, 2023 | 26:04 |
It seemed like a simpler time, and the problems faced by the people in that small rural town seemed simpler too... or maybe it was a dreadful blindness that just made it appear that way.
| 80 | "Devils Everywhere You Turn" | October 13, 2023 | 55:58 |
On the hurting streets of Claysmith, Connecticut, a hideous comedy of errors engulfs the innocent and guilty alike. Note: Features additional narration by Linda Wojtowick, Richard Werner, Beth Abdallah, Mig Windows, C.S.W., Wilson James Randall, Brian Lillie, Amy Paonessa, Charolette Kulak, Paul Fergus, Teddy Ray Bullard, Dana Bolton, Corey Nelson, Conner Roslan, TheFinalGirly, Hugh Pierece, Caity Roberts, Lee Van Der Voo, Jeremy Fershleiser, and Karen Smith.
| 81 | "detour" | January 5, 2024 | 52:11 |
For the dead of winter, an old-fashioned ghost story set in a hot and humid place.
| 82 | "sabbatical" | February 5, 2024 | 40:29 |
A snowy walk reveals the beginnings of a mystery that grows weirder with each passing hour.
| 83 | "summoners" | March 8, 2024 | 40:42 |
All the user reviews of the real-life bar at the center of this story are exactly what you'd expect for a well-liked business. But then, such reviews are not the medium to express everything that one might feel or sense when the hour grows late, and the lights get low.
| 84 | "steps" | April 12, 2024 | 44:13 |
Always go very, very slowly through your radio dial, especially late at night. You never quite know when a faint signal will offer something a little unexpected.
| 85 | "doggo" | May 24, 2024 | 42:19 |
There’s always a small element of worry that comes when you leave a stranger to watch your property, children, or pets. Even if you’re fully trusting, here comes that gnawing sense that you yourself may have created a problem, because you didn’t quite bring yourself to tell the sitter... everything.
| 86 | "crannies" | June 21, 2024 | 24:22 |
Many people who hear things behind their walls suspect their house is haunted, but can’t prove it. Maybe they’re failing to ask one very simple question: How did those walls even come to be? Note: Features additional narration by Charlotte Kulak.
| 87 | "majesty" | July 27, 2024 | 60:41 |
The 19th-century reign of the mysterious Buth Sugo was detailed only in this one ugly, bloody, regrettable record.
| 88 | "A Quick Quintet of Terror" | August 27, 2024 | 87:52 |
Five shorter tales… and just a smidgen more. Note: The individual stories in this episode are titled "novelty", "screen-share", "sleeperette", "jarprechaun", and "tempt".
| 89 | "harbingers" | September 25, 2024 | 39:02 |
An educator's watch of the winter skies sets him in anxious motion to shelter the innocent. Note: Incorporates excerpts from a 1982 interview with Ila Patton of Galax, Virginia as part of the Library of Congress' American Folklife Center project.
| 90 | "here" | October 16, 2024 | 16:39 |
A dark October country road, a driver, a hitchhiker... and a strange, strange story told across cold, lonely miles.
| 91 | "rory" | January 5, 2025 | 35:45 |
When two colleagues in crime come together again after years apart, one reveals a looming threat more awful than incarceration… or even capital punishment.
| 92 | "Carried by Beasts" | February 7, 2025 | 34:13 |
Opening statements in what would come to be considered one of the strangest trials in the history of New York state. Note: Features additional narration by Emma Fradd.
| 93 | "stranglehold" | March 7, 2025 | 56:01 |
A youthful lark across the states takes a man into the heart of an awful anomaly.
| 94 | "postmarks" | April 13, 2025 | 43:30 |
Ask people in the Cleveland area about The Ron Tanglethorn Show and you might get a few nods here and there. Never the most popular late-night offering on the AM band, it's remembered by diehards mostly for the rather unusual way it signed off the air for good.
| 95 | "huntress" | April 28, 2025 | 19:34 |
Originally heard as ‘Q & A With a Vampire Killer’ on the Alexandria Archives podcast, this is a former college student’s reflection on an unusual glimpse into a dangerous world.
| 96 | "deep" | May 9, 2025 | 72:-- |
Ask people in the Cleveland area about The Ron Tanglethorn Show and you might get a few nods here and there. Never the most popular late-night offering on the AM band, it's remembered by diehards mostly for the rather unusual way it signed off the air for good.
| 97 | "Paranormal Appraisal 151" | May 23, 2025 | 17:25 |
Originally heard on the Alexandria Archives podcast, this is the final recording of a man whose chosen profession finally bit back hard. Note: Features additional narration by Amy Paonessa.
| 98 | "snatchers" | June 9, 2025 | 45:57 |
A story of desperate men, bad decisions, terrible timing, and unexpected faces in the dark. Note: Features additional narration by Charlotte Kulak.
| 99 | "The Vincents" | June 25, 2025 | 15:11 |
In this story originally written for the Halloween 2024 episode of Kevin Lane’s Spill Your Guts podcast to accompany a few Knifepoint Horror tales interpreted by other actors, a man of science relates an encounter with a mysterious desert legend.
| 100 | "throat" | July 10, 2025 | 34:20 |
A young man’s strange natural gift evolves to wield a disturbing influence.
| 101 | "swerve" | July 25, 2025 | 12:47 |
In the moody late hours at The Cask & Pear, an all-night dive bar and diner on the edge of the city, some of the stories patrons tell definitely lean toward the unusual.
| 102 | "patrolman" | August 7, 2025 | 35:43 |
Memories of one very, very strange winter's day in the life of a weary public servant. Note: Features additional narration by Linda Wojtowick.
| 103 | "sunken" | August 22, 2025 | 15:23 |
Even after museum hours ended that day, some people walked out to the waterside and just looked at the object silently for several minutes, not knowing what to think, or what to feel.
| 104 | "carrion" | September 9, 2025 | 34:12 |
Walk through most neighborhoods, and you get at least a general sense of people’s back yards. But where the truly wealthy live on enormous gated parcels of land, you quickly notice it’s almost impossible to either see or know what’s going on back there. With all that space and total anonymity, it really could be… anything.
| 105 | "slither" | September 25, 2025 | 13:47 |
No homeowner's policy in existence covers everything.
| 106 | "Another Three for Halloween" | October 7, 2025 | 58:26 |
Two tales of Knifepoint Horror, and two radio plays. Note: The individual stories in this episode are titled "straightaway", "spillage", and "caveat". They are bookended by a prologue and epilogue respectively titled "traditions, part 1" and "traditions, part 2".
| 107 | "Halloween Special: The BUFFET of the UNCANNY!" | October 27, 2025 | 32:36 |
Here’s an off-the-record, completely unserious Halloween palate cleanser for when you just can’t take doofuses like me trying to scare you anymore.
| 108 | "Halloween Special: Among the Strangeness" | October 31, 2025 | 24:48 |
A horror-lite excursion into my foggy memories of real moments when things suddenly didn't quite add up... and the unknown asserted itself just enough to make me feel around for the anti-supernatural spray I always keep by my bedside. - S.N. Note: This is a non-fiction episode, with Narnia recounting several unexplained events that have happened in his own life.
| 109 | "exiles" | November 7, 2025 | 54:43 |
A father and son confront the impossible phenomena that wait patiently to strike from within terribly familiar places.
| 110 | "pretender" | November 25, 2025 | 16:20 |
Someone you passed on the street this month was not quite who they appeared to be. And for one in a million people you pass, the self is just a cheap wire frame they dangerously abandoned long ago.
| 111 | "fictions" | December 8, 2025 | 41:14 |
A classic novel takes on frightening significance for an inexperienced reader.
| 112 | "bloodborne" | December 22, 2025 | 13:10 |
Some jobs hold more unusual hazards than others. And some of those hazards are just... oh boy.
| 113 | "velocity" | January 8, 2026 | 40:59 |
The arrival of something mysterious and deadly in a small town sends a boy’s imagination spiraling.
| 114 | "An Oral History of Hell" | January 23, 2026 | 108:00 |
'An Oral History of Hell,' a story written before this podcast began, is a bleak, brutish tale of suspense related by a narrator condemned to Hell's wintry plain. The Grip, the Speaking Stones, the Far Mountains, the Perimeter, the Lie: In describing Hell's harsh geography and customs, Nicholas Strait also describes the events and people that brought him to damnation. His search for a way out must navigate madness, addiction, and the immutable hand of death. Note: Narnia previously narrated an older version of this story on a 2016 episode of his second podcast Those Snowy Nights You Read to Me, They'll Never Be Forgotten.
| 115 | "Up Near the Neverwills" | February 11, 2026 | 15:44 |
Flashlight: Check. Water bottle: Check. Satellite phone: Check. Beef jerky: Check. Defensive weapons: To be determined. Note: Features additional narration by Mig Windows.
| 116 | "The Source Recordings, Volume 1" | February 26, 2026 | 47:48 |
For the creepypasta lover in all of us, here’s a different, more raw way to experience a few older stories from the series—directly from the mouths of the witnesses, who have no use for some author's careful prose or dramatic effects. Note: This episode features condensed retellings of three previous stories ("bargain", "A Convergence in Wintertime", & "legend"), narrated by Meyer Statham, Tiffany Gideon, and 'CSAR', respectively.
| 117 | "layabout" | March 12, 2026 | 74:32 |
Eat right. Get plenty of exercise. You never know when you might need every last resource of the body to make it through the night alive.
| 118 | "The Source Recordings, Volume 2" | March 30, 2026 | 51:18 |
For the creepypasta lover in all of us, here’s a different, more raw way to experience a few older stories from the series—directly from the mouths of the witnesses, who have no use for some author's careful prose or dramatic effects. Note: This episode features condensed retellings of three previous stories ("hole", "Twelve Tiny Cabins", & "laborer"), narrated by Paul Kandarian, Ed Dowdall, and Isaac Dempsey, respectively.
| 119 | "evolvers" | April 9, 2026 | 51:27 |
The central figure in a medical mystery is pulled down a labyrinthine path to its surreal conclusion.
| 120 | "The Source Recordings, Volume 3" | April 23, 2026 | 65:33 |
Volume 3 of 3. For the secret creepypasta lover in all of us, here’s a different, more raw way to experience some older stories from the series — directly from the mouths of the witnesses, who have no use for some author's careful prose or dramatic effects. Note: This episode features condensed retellings of three previous stories ("family", "The Crack", & "compulsion"), narrated by Michael Bach, Isaac Lewis, and Jackson Fischer, respectively.
| 121 | "Otto Begged to Die" | May 7, 2026 | 39:38 |
Somewhere in the harmless slush pile of the children's TV shows of our youth, we all left something that still resonates even after all these years... and that thing is not always welcome. Note: Features additional narration by Amy Paonessa, Les Lentz, Lee Van Der Voo, Paul Fergus, Mig Windows, Beth Abdallah, Tanya Wade, Paul Kandarian, Isaiah Hernandez, Brian Lillie, "H.", Danny Schubert, and Diana Siedel.

== Adaptations ==
In November 2019, the podcast was adapted into a graphic novel titled Knifepoint Horror Anthology: Eight Tales of Terror, which was illustrated by V.V. Glass, Adam Cadwell, John J. Pearson, and five other artists. Specifically, it features the stories "Let No One Walk Beside Her", "thrifting", "visitation", "west", "moonkeeper", "trail", "lake", and "sisters".

The podcast has also been adapted into books as well:

- Narnia, Soren (February 28, 2012). The Complete Knifepoint Horror. CreateSpace Independent Publishing Platform. ISBN 978-1-4701-6429-4.
- Narnia, Soren (February 13, 2007). Knifepoint Horror: Book One. iUniverse. ISBN 978-0-5954-2969-1.
- Narnia, Soren (December 11, 2018). Knifepoint Horror: The Transcripts, Volume 1. CreateSpace Independent Publishing Platform. ISBN 978-1-7244-7131-4.
- Narnia, Soren (December 12, 2018). Knifepoint Horror: The Transcripts, Volume 2. CreateSpace Independent Publishing Platform. ISBN 978-1-7298-2535-8.
- Narnia, Soren (December 13, 2018). Knifepoint Horror: The Transcripts, Volume 3. CreateSpace Independent Publishing Platform. ISBN 978-1-7298-2561-7.
- Narnia, Soren (December 12, 2018). Knifepoint Horror: The Transcripts, Volume 4. CreateSpace Independent Publishing Platform. ISBN 978-1-7298-4164-8.
- Narnia, Soren (September 28, 2020). Knifepoint Horror: The Transcripts, Volume 5. Independently published. ISBN 979-8-6887-1573-6.
- Narnia, Soren (February 7, 2022). Knifepoint Horror: The Transcripts, Volume 6. Independently published. ISBN 979-8-4146-0277-4.

The story "staircase" has been adapted three times into a short film. The Thing from the Hallway, directed by Tony J. Rivas and starring Mike Bash and Hilary Barraford, was released in March 2018 and later won a Silver Spotlight award. Neighborhood Watch, directed by Nolan Sordyl and starring Cody McGlashan and Joanna McGinley, was released in October 2021. Staircase, a Swedish production directed by Agnes Gester and starring Jim Änglykke and Josefin Nordberg, was released in October 2024.

== Reception ==
Knifepoint Horror has received critical acclaim from numerous online sources over the years, many of whom have ranked it among the best or scariest horror podcasts of all time. In 2014, The A.V. Club wrote that the show's "minimalist style is meant to resemble old-fashioned campfire stories, but campfire stories were never this unsettling. Narnia is gifted with a direct voice and a mind for terrifying setups." Vox's Aja Romano made similar observations three years later, writing: "For sheer chills-around-the-campfire-style storytelling, nothing beats Knifepoint [...] its effectiveness derives partly from its minimalism, and the way creator Soren Narnia allows the silence to fill your mind with terror." In 2021, Romano wrote another Vox article on the podcast, as a part of the website's 'One Good Thing' series, in which she observed: "Over the years, Knifepoint Horror has gained a small but dedicated fan following, and I think that's in part because there's something deeply brave about Knifepoint as a creative exercise. Many of the stories feel as though they're being spun aloud, impromptu. [...] That makes every story in Knifepoint Horror feel like a triumph, a rough diamond of creative expression that dares to speak itself aloud, flaws and all — to exist in the tense space between Soren Narnia's brain and a judgmental audience steeped in horror tropes. Except somehow, defying all odds, the rough diamond is always brilliant, sparkling in the dark." Sara Century, writing for Los Angeles Review of Books' 'Podcast Review' in 2020, noted that its "tales are more like character studies than anything else, so by the time you make it to “the scary part,” it's all the more effective as it comes as a complete surprise." "Among horror podcasts", she concluded, "KPH is one of the most consistently unsettling."

== Influence ==
Jonathan Sims cites Knifepoint Horror as one of the influences behind his writing on horror podcast The Magnus Archives.

Emma & Matt Fradd also cite Soren Narnia as their greatest influence to their fictional horror podcast, Sibling Horror.

== See also ==
- Horror podcast
- List of horror podcasts
