= Let's Not Meet: A True Horror Podcast =

Horror and crime podcast

- Genre: Horror; Crime
- Language: American English

Production
- Length: Approx. 60 minutes

Publication
- No. of seasons: 14
- No. of episodes: >300
- Original release: January 22, 2017
- Provider: Cryptic County

Related
- Website: letsnotmeetpodcast.com

Let's Not Meet: A True Horror Podcast is a horror podcast produced by Cryptic County consisting of stories from real people who have experienced real horror incidents and unwanted encounters.

== Background ==
Cryptic County prefers using as few sound effects and music as possible and instead focus on the storytelling. The host reads roughly six stories in each episode, which are about one hour in length. The show tells true horror stories written by people who have experienced unwanted encounters. The show has released over 280 episodes over the course of twelve seasons.

== Reception ==
The show was a finalist in the 2019 Discover Pods awards. Podcast Magazine ranked the show as number twenty-five on their list of the best horror and crime podcasts. Anthony D. Herrera of The A.V. Club commented on the show saying that "there is some variation in the quality of the writing ... [but] the authenticity always shines through." Madeline Wahl of Reader's Digest praised the show saying that the listener will "be hooked (and a little jumpy) after listening to just one episode." Emily Stein of CrimeReads praised the show's host saying that "…does an excellent job of convincingly taking on the voice of each writer." Nicky Idika of PopBuzz commented on the show saying that the show "will have you thinking carefully about every interaction you have from now on." Kayla Osborne of The Camden-Narellan Advertiser commented on the show saying that the "podcast is the equivalent of the hair on the back of your neck standing up."

== See also ==
- List of horror podcasts
