= Unwell (podcast) =

Horror podcast

Unwell, a Midwestern Gothic Mystery
- Other names: Unwell
- Country of origin: United States
- Language: English
- Starring
- Original release: October 3, 2017
- No. of series: 5
- Website: www.unwellpodcast.com

Unwell, a Midwestern Gothic Mystery is a drama-dark fantasy horror podcast produced by Hartlife NFP. It premiered on February 19, 2019, and concluded on September 13, 2023, with the end of its fifth season.

The story follows a woman named Lilian "Lily" Harper (voiced by Clarisa Cherie Rios) returning back to her native remote town of Mt. Absalom, Ohio to look after her semi-estranged mother Dorothy "Dot" Harper (Marsha Harman), who runs a boarding house and recently suffered an injury; as strange events multiply, Lily and boarding house residents Abigail "Abbie" Douglas (Kathleen Hoil) and Rudolphus "Rudy" Peltham (Joshua K. Harris) start suspecting that Mt. Absalom -and its residents- are hiding many secrets. The podcast won a 2021 Audio Drama Award from the BBC.

== Background ==
The podcast began on February 19, 2019. The podcast is produced by Hartlife NFP. The show was inspired by Gravity Falls and House of Leaves. The premise of the show is that the protagonist, Lillian Harper, has returned home to her mother who owns an old boarding house in the Midwestern United States where strange things have been happening. Lily and her mother have been estranged for a long time, but her mother injured herself and needed someone to care for her while she recovered.

== Reception ==
Phoebe Lett wrote in The New York Times that the show might be horror but is also "goofy, romantic, funny or heart warming." Wil Williams commented on Polygon that the podcast uses silence to make the audience unsettled rather than jump scares. Scott Beggs wrote in Thrillist that the podcast "has the highest quality sound production." Toni Oisin wrote in Collider that the podcast is an "enticing and fresh listen." Digital Trends included the show on their best of 2022 list and said it had "impeccable audio and a quirky sense of humor." The podcast won a 2021 Audio Drama Award from BBC.
