= Unexplained (podcast) =

British story-based podcast

- Unexplained podcast logo
- Genre: Non-Fiction, Horror, Sci-Fi, Documentary
- Country of origin: United Kingdom

Creative team
- Created by: Richard MacLean Smith
- Written by: Richard MacLean Smith, Diane Hope, Emma Dibdin, Neil McRobert, James Conor Paterson, Ella MacLeod

Cast and voices
- Hosted by: Richard MacLean Smith

Music
- Theme music composed by: Richard MacLean Smith

Production
- Length: 25-45 minutes

Publication
- Provider: iHeart

Related
- Website: www.unexplainedpodcast.com

Unexplained is a British narrative non-fiction podcast created and hosted by writer and musician Richard MacLean Smith. Launched in 2016, the series explores mysteries, folklore, and alleged paranormal phenomena.

== Content ==
Each episode typically has a duration of 25 to 35 minutes and focuses on a specific mystery or a series of related events. The program utilizes historical records, eyewitness accounts, and academic research to provide context for its subject matter.

== Reception ==
By January 2017 the series had reached #2 on the Apple chart.

The series has been generally positively received. The podcast reviewer Find That Pod described it as a “thinking person’s scary podcast”, giving it a rating of 4/5 stars. In 2021, The New York Times recommended the podcast, praising how the show “resists the urge to ham it up”. The Financial Times and The Guardian reviewed the show positively. The series was also included on Apple’s “Best of 2016” year-end list.

== Adaptations ==
In 2018, Richard MacLean Smith published Unexplained: Real-Life Supernatural Stories for Uncertain Times:

- MacLean Smith, Richard (2018). Unexplained: Supernatural Stories for Uncertain Times. Scepter. ISBN 9781473671126.

== Related Podcasts ==
In 2019, MacLean Smith released the choose-your-own-adventure style horror podcast The Forest, inspired by the slavic folkloric character Baba Yaga.

== See also ==
- Horror podcast
- List of horror podcasts
