= Campfire Radio Theater =

American horror audio drama podcast

- Cover artwork incorporating a photo by StockSnap, designed by Kevin Hartnell and John Ballentine
- Genre: Horror, audio drama
- Language: English

Creative team
- Created by: John Ballentine (writer, director, producer, sound designer, editor)

Music
- Composed by: Kevin Hartnell

Publication
- Original release: December 2011
- Provider: Podbean

Related
- Website: https://campfireradiotheater.podbean.com

Campfire Radio Theater is an American horror audio drama podcast created and produced by John Ballentine. It premiered in December 2011 and features original anthology-style horror stories in the tradition of classic radio dramas such as CBS Radio Mystery Theater, Suspense, and Nightfall. The podcast is independently produced and known for its immersive sound design and performances by professional voice actors.

== Origins ==
According to creator John Ballentine, the inspiration for Campfire Radio Theater came from his teenage years in the early 1980s, when he discovered radio drama via NPR broadcasts. He was especially drawn to the Canadian horror anthology series Nightfall, which aired on CBC and left a strong impression due to its immersive, cinematic sound and disturbing stories. Ballentine recalled the experience of being transfixed by terrifying tales that fired his imagination. Years later, motivated by a lifelong fascination with audio horror and his own unpublished fiction, he launched Campfire Radio Theater in 2011 as a contemporary revival of the classic audio drama format.

== Format and Content ==
Episodes typically run between 26 and 43 minutes and are self-contained horror stories exploring horror, supernatural, psychological, or suspenseful themes. The show incorporates cinematic production values, including a full cast, original music, and immersive soundscapes. Most episodes are written, directed, and produced by John Ballentine in his home studio in South Carolina. Guest writers have also contributed scripts.

Original scores for most episodes are composed by multi-instrumentalist musician/composer and sound designer Kevin Hartnell, who joined the podcast in 2014 with the episode The Philadelphia Xperiment. He has contributed music to many subsequent episodes, blending analog synthesizers, orchestral elements, and ambient textures. Hartnell is credited with co-producing the episodes Gerald and Ravenous, and contributed the original story concept for Last Resort. Hartnell is also credited with writing, directing, and producing a short segment titled Red Apron, which appears at the beginning of the episode Death and Alchemy as a tie-in to Ravenous.

== Notable Writers ==
The podcast has featured stories by several acclaimed authors:

Joe R. Lansdale, Bram Stoker Award-winning author of Bubba Ho-Tep and other horror and crime fiction.

Tim Wynne-Jones, Canadian author and Governor General's Award recipient, whose story The Road Ends at the Sea was adapted for the podcast.

Bill Gray, former CBC Radio writer/producer known for his work on Nightfall and other Canadian radio dramas.

Cameron Scott, playwright and screenwriter known for Uphill and That Day is Coming, Every Day is Coming.

== Cast and Notable Contributors ==
Campfire Radio Theater has featured voice work from several professional actors in the horror and audio drama space:

David Ault in Ravenous

Melissa Medina in Blood Drive

Steve Mize in Blood Drive

Jared Rivet in Last Resort

Graham Rowat in The Devil and the Deep Blue Sea

== Reception ==
The podcast has received critical acclaim and has been featured in several media outlets and academic publications:

Named the top pick among five best anthology podcasts in a January 2023 Guardian "best podcasts of the week" column, which highlighted its sound design and episodes featuring a menacing Santa figure, unsettling puppets, and a remote lighthouse.

Winner of the 2017 Parsec Award for Best Speculative Fiction Audio Drama (Short Form) for the episode Woods Ferry.

Winner of the Fiction category at the 2023 American Writing Awards' Podcast of the Year competition.

Featured in a 25-podcast roundup titled "A Digital World, Darkly" in Rue Morgue magazine (issue #171, October 2016), which described it as an "award-winning" anthology known for its "take a seat by the fire" host framing.

Discussed in a 2017 peer-reviewed article on podcast horror published in Palgrave Communications (now Humanities and Social Sciences Communications), which analyzes the show's "take a seat by the fire" host framing as an example of horror podcasting's collective, campfire-style listener address, and lists it among horror podcasts predating Welcome to Night Vale.

Featured in a 2020 Film Daily roundup of horror podcasts, "Gothtober: Check out these horror podcasts for a good scare," which praised its sound production and Rod Serling-style narration.

Featured in Playbill and BroadwayWorld for its audio drama adaptation of West Palm Readers.

== Distribution and Reach ==
Episodes are available on major podcast platforms including Apple Podcasts, Spotify, and Podbean. New episodes are typically released a few times per year.

== See also ==
- Audio drama
- List of horror podcasts
- Suspense (radio drama)
- Nightfall (radio series)
- CBS Radio Mystery Theater

== Episodes ==
In the following list, three guest episodes that featured in 2018 as part of the Campfire Radio Theater Summer Campfire Screams have been omitted as they are not Campfire Radio Theater productions.

Title	Release date	Duration	Synopsis
Lost Acre	October 26, 2026	48 min	A young mother fleeing an abusive relationship moves with her infant son to a remote rural house, where unexplained events reveal a long-buried secret connected to the property.
Winter's Bite	August 30, 2026	41 min	A brutal animalistic killing in a snowbound Minnesota community fuels fear and suspicion as residents confront the possibility that something unnatural is hunting among them.
Fallen Angel	April 26, 2026	31 min	A mysterious relic recovered from a rumored UFO crash site sparks a deadly struggle between a conspiracy YouTuber, a rogue defense contractor, and a military general seeking to unlock its secrets.
Paranormal Appraisal 151	December 1, 2025	33 min	A routine paranormal case spirals out of control when a skeptical investigator encounters a chilling, utterly unexplainable phenomenon.
October Gods	October 20, 2025	30 min	A rebellious teen defies the rigid rules of a small town's mysterious pumpkin patch, unleashing a wrathful entity.
Hollow Born	September 14, 2025	36 min	A young woman uncovers a terrifying family secret buried beneath the House of Whitmore on the haunted moors of 19th century England.
Blood Drive	April 14, 2025	40 min	A late-night fare takes a dark turn in a crime-infested city when a rideshare driver is led into a sinister dance club.
Final Resting Place	December 22, 2024	31 min	A cemetery caretaker and grandson uncover ominous underground rumblings.
The Heretic's Handbook	October 13, 2024	42 min	Newlyweds fall prey to a pagan cult at a secluded woodland retreat.
West Palm Readers	July 28, 2024	37 min	A tarot shop couple in Times Square face a terrifying scheme when a new client steps in.
The Devil and the Deep Blue Sea	March 24, 2024	43 min	A submarine captain faces annihilation at sea amid haunting visions and a spectral predator.
Desecrate	October 22, 2023	40 min	A Halloween séance in a cemetery unearths betrayal and horror among friends.
Ties of Blood Part Two	September 13, 2023	30 min	Nikki continues her investigation into the Red Hill abductions as danger escalates.
Ties of Blood Part One	August 27, 2023	29 min	A young woman suspects her nocturnal neighbor is hiding a deadly secret.
Last Resort	March 19, 2023	32 min	A grieving, broken man searches for his past within a surreal dreamlike reality.
The Dreams of Wolves	October 23, 2022	43 min	Union soldiers sheltering in a plantation home during the Civil War are stalked by a beast.
The Road Ends at the Sea	July 11, 2022	30 min	A widower revisits a remote lighthouse where doom awaits offshore.
Abominations	March 6, 2022	35 min	A carnival medium stirs suspicion and fear with uncanny performances.
The Bones of Saint Nicholas	December 12, 2021	35 min	A single mom faces a terrifying mall Santa after a bitter divorce.
The Ghost of Lori Keegan	October 18, 2021	41 min	Angela is haunted by a childhood trauma and ghostly visions after revisiting her old school.
Gerald	November 29, 2020	39 min	A minister's son is haunted by a possibly imaginary friend amid a rash of unspeakable crimes.
The Thing on the Ground Floor Part Two	October 25, 2020	29 min	A found footage horror from a reality TV crew concludes with an unspeakable terror.
The Thing on the Ground Floor Part One	October 13, 2020	34 min	Reality TV turns nightmarish during a taping at the infamous Talbert Building.
The Resurrectionist Part Two	July 12, 2020	30 min	A girl and her father face a deadly cult obsessed with communicating with the dead.
The Resurrectionist Part One	June 13, 2020	27 min	A spiritual medium and her trucker daughter uncover a mysterious cult and their own past.
Incident On and Off a Mountain Road	October 24, 2019	34 min	A woman fights for survival in the wilderness against a pale, brutal killer.
Blood Puppets	June 4, 2019	35 min	Haunted by puppets from a local children's show, a woman unravels into paranoia.
Monster's Game	October 31, 2017	35 min	A schizophrenic young man hears a sinister new voice guiding him down a darker path.
Death and Alchemy	October 2, 2017	39 min	A Victorian doctor attempts to resurrect the dead via dark alchemy.
Ravenous	June 10, 2017	33 min	A journalist investigates cannibal legends in the Scottish coastal village of Redmayne.
Abduction at Willow Woods	January 27, 2017	32 min	Two friends confront a buried otherworldly encounter from their youth.
Rites of Autumn	October 24, 2016	26 min	A young boy's grandfather shares a Halloween tale involving a deadly visitor.
Woods Ferry	June 4, 2016	34 min	Explorers uncover the horrific past of a forgotten, evacuated ghost town.
Whispers From Hell	October 25, 2015	29 min	A voyeuristic predator stalks a young woman amid a deadly suburban secret.
Night Delivery	September 20, 2015	38 min	A DJ is swept into a nightmare by a woman with demonic connections and reverse lyrics.
Ghosts of Flannan Lighthouse	March 25, 2015	34 min	An investigator discovers a lighthouse crew's eerie fate tied to an ancient journal.
RIP Part II	October 27, 2014	34 min	Victorian pub ghosts reveal a bloody past involving Jack the Ripper.
RIP Part I	October 5, 2014	26 min	Newlyweds honeymoon in a haunted pub and encounter the ghost of Whitechapel.
The Philadelphia Xperiment	May 11, 2014	33 min	A WW2 veteran relives a mind-bending military experiment from 1951.
Dreaming of a Dead Christmas	December 15, 2013	29 min	College girls hit a man with their truck, then awaken zombies at a truck stop.
The War of the Worlds	October 27, 2013	37 min	A woman's phone diary captures a firsthand alien invasion.
The Dentist	September 1, 2013	30 min	A new assistant suspects her employer of sinister dental malpractice.
Hungry Hollow	February 6, 2013	31 min	Three boys on a camping trip become prey to a dark mountain ritual.
Twilight Road	October 22, 2012	27 min	A woman declared dead comes to on the embalming table, desperate to escape the morgue.
The Haunted Cell	July 29, 2012	27 min	A condemned killer haunts a darkened cell. (Lights Out adaptation)
The Master's Hungry Children	March 26, 2012	32 min	WW2-era Nazis in a Romanian village are stalked by a bloodthirsty force in the night.
Night Chills	December 31, 2011	30 min	A family's new home hides a terrifying nocturnal visitor.
Demon Eyes	December 17, 2011	33 min	An FBI agent investigates a killer before a terrifying vision descends.
