= Old Gods of Appalachia =

Horror podcast

- Genre: Horror podcast
- Language: English

Creative team
- Created by: Steve Shell; Cam Collins

Cast and voices
- Narrated by: Steve Shell

Music
- Theme music composed by: Landon Blood

Production
- Production: DeepNerd Media
- Length: 11–77 minutes

Publication
- No. of seasons: 4
- No. of episodes: 65
- Original release: October 31, 2019 – present
- Provider: RustyQuill
- Updates: Weekly

Related
- Website: oldgodsofappalachia.com

Old Gods of Appalachia is a horror podcast written by Cam Collins and Steve Shell that debuted on October 31, 2019. The show is produced by DeepNerd Media, is distributed by Rusty Quill, and was adapted into a role-playing game by Monte Cook Games. Each episode uses a combination of narration and audio drama to tell historical fiction stories based on Appalachian folklore. The sixth season premiered on January 15, 2026.

== Background ==
The show is written by Steve Shell and Cam Collins. The stories are original fiction that draws on a mix of history and folk tales for inspiration and address strange things from witchcraft to the paranormal. The cast for the show either currently live or grew up in Appalachia.

== Episodes ==
Season	Episodes	Originally released	
Season	Episodes	First released	Last released
1	14	October 31, 2019	January 30, 2020
2	20	September 10, 2020	July 15, 2021
3	20	March 17, 2022	January 12, 2023
4	20	August 24, 2023	May 30, 2024
5	20	December 5, 2024	September 18, 2025
6	TBA	January 15, 2026	TBA

=== Season 1 (2019–20) ===
No.	Title	Length	Written by	Original release date
0	"Prologue"	11:36	Steve Shell	October 31, 2019
0.5	"The Witch Queen"	25:23	Steve Shell	November 6, 2019
1	"Old Number Seven: Barlo, Kentucky 1917: Part One"	18:05	Steve Shell	November 7, 2019
2	"The Schoolhouse: Barlo Kentucky 1917: Part Two"	19:57	Steve Shell	November 14, 2019
2.5	"Let There Be Green"	12:59	Steve Shell	November 21, 2019
3	"The Covenant: Barlo, Kentucky 1917: Part Three"	21:40	Cam Collins	November 28, 2019
4	"The Sacrifice: Barlo, Kentucky 1917: Part Four"	23:21	Cam Collins	December 5, 2019
4.5	"The Bad Death and Resurrection of Annie Messer"	22:53	Steve Shell	December 13, 2019
5	"The Boy: Barlo, Kentucky 1917: Part Five"	29:22	Steve Shell	December 19, 2019
6	"The Witch Queen Chapter II: Doubt"	24:04	Steve Shell	December 26, 2019
7	"Afterbirth: Season Finale Part 1"	27:50	Steve Shell	January 9, 2020
8	"Homecoming: Season Finale Part 2"	24:55	Cam Collins	January 16, 2020
9	"You Ready to Go Home? Season Finale Part 3"	28:02	Steve Shell	January 23, 2020
10	"The Witch Queen Chapter III: Last Harbor: Season Finale Part 4"	35:48	Steve Shell	January 30, 2020

=== Season 2 (2020–21) ===
No.	Title	Length	Written by	Original release date
11	"Season Two Prologue"	14:18	Steve Shell	September 10, 2020
12	"The Other Queen"	24:39	Steve Shell	September 24, 2020
13	"The Dark Earth at Night"	30:34	Steve Shell	October 8, 2020
14	"On Death Island"	26:25	Steve Shell	October 22, 2020
15	"A Funeral in Pine"	29:15	Steve Shell	November 5, 2020
16	"Between the Unburied and Miss Belle"	36:32	Steve Shell	November 19, 2020
17	"The Boy Who Could Not Die"	36:33	Cam Collins and Steve Shell	December 3, 2020
18	"Where the Cold Wind Blows"	30:55	Cam Collins	January 21, 2021
19	"Where the Sun Never Shines"	28:05	Cam Collins	February 4, 2021
20	"Am I Born to Die?"	38:22	Steve Shell	February 28, 2021
21	"A Worthy Grave"	31:59	Cam Collins	March 4, 2021
22	"Paper, Ink and Sorrow"	23:25	Steve Shell	March 24, 2021
23	"A Bad Night for Hollow Men"	37:49	Steve Shell	April 8, 2021
24	"Charcoal Suit and All"	41:31	Steve Shell and Cam Collins	April 22, 2021
25	"The Siege of Pleasant Evenings"	42:50	Steve Shell and Cam Collins	May 6, 2021
26	"Welcome to Paradise"	21:03	Cam Collins and Steve Shell	May 20, 2021
27	"Strangers in Paradise"	29:14	Cam Collins	June 3, 2021
28	"Paradise Lost"	36:34	Cam Collins	June 17, 2021
29	"A Friend of the Family"	42:26	Cam Collins and Steve Shell	July 1, 2021
30	"The Dead Queen"	1:17:46	Cam Collins and Steve Shell	July 15, 2021

=== Season 3 (2022–23) ===
No.	Title	Length	Written by	Original release date
31	"Season Three Prologue"	20:19	Steve Shell	March 17, 2022
32	"Runs in the Family"	29:10	Cam Collins and Steve Shell	March 31, 2022
33	"Special Delivery"	34:05	Cam Collins	April 14, 2022
34	"On Oak Mountain"	33:59	Cam Collins	April 28, 2022
35	"More Harm than Good"	44:40	Cam Collins and Steve Shell	May 12, 2022
36	"Eminent Domain"	32:27	Steve Shell	June 9, 2022
37	"The Other Walker House"	31:17	Steve Shell	June 23, 2022
38	"Diary of a Preacher's Daughter"	28:20	Steve Shell and Cam Collins	July 7, 2022
39	"The Blood of the Mountain"	38:32	Steve Shell and Cam Collins	July 21, 2022
40	"The Well of Remembrance"	46:22	Steve Shell and Cam Collins	August 4, 2022
41	"Return to Paradise"	28:19	Cam Collins	August 25, 2022
42	"A Fool's Paradise"	28:00	Cam Collins	September 8, 2022
43	"Escape from Paradise"	39:05	Cam Collins	September 22, 2022
44	"A Brace of Kinsmen"	26:39	Steve Shell	October 6, 2022
45	"Hollowed Be Thy Name"	31:37	Steve Shell	October 20, 2022
46	"Lay Not upon Us Innocent Blood"	28:19	Steve Shell	November 17, 2022
47	"Cast Me Forth Unto the Sea"	25:52	Steve Shell	December 1, 2022
48	"By Reason of Mine Affliction"	46:35	Cam Collins	December 15, 2022
49	"Sackcloth and Ashes"	44:50	Cam Collins	January 5, 2023
50	"The Horns of the Altar"	1:05:58	Cam Collins and Steve Shell	January 12, 2023

=== Season 4 (2023–24) ===
No.	Title	Length	Written by	Original release date
51	"Season Four Prologue"	13:24	Cam Collins	August 24, 2023
52	"The Men of the Rock"	25:58	Cam Collins and Steve Shell	September 7, 2023
53	"Due Process"	32:52	Cam Collins and Steve Shell	September 21, 2023
54	"Caveat Emptor"	34:03	Steve Shell and Cam Collins	October 5, 2023
55	"The Matter of the Children"	35:19	Cam Collins and Steve Shell	October 19, 2023
56	"The Traveling Marvels"	33:38	Cam Collins and Steve Shell	November 2, 2023
57	"The Land of Nod"	34:47	Cam Collins and Steve Shell	November 16, 2023
58	"Opportunity Knocks"	40:37	Cam Collins	November 30, 2023
59	"Points of Order"	26:27	Cam Collins	December 14, 2023
60	"The Tale of Mr. Poe"	33:38	Steve Shell	January 4, 2024
61	"Mixed Blessings"	30:22	Steve Shell and Cam Collins	January 11, 2024
62	"Small Favors"	29:42	Steve Shell and Cam Collins	February 8, 2024
63	"The Ways of the Dead"	36:40	Cam Collins and Steve Shell	February 22, 2024
64	"Last Stand at Copper Ridge"	27:58	Cam Collins and Steve Shell	March 7, 2024
65	"Debt Collections"	35:06	Cam Collins and Steve Shell	March 21, 2024
66	"Night Comes to the Rock"	TBA	Steve Shell and Cam Collins	April 4, 2024
67	"Goldie Graves"	TBA	Steve Shell and Cam Collins	April 18, 2024
68	"The Bonds of Friendship"	TBA	Cam Collins and Steve Shell	May 2, 2024
69	"Nice and Easy"	TBA	Steve Shell and Cam Collins	May 16, 2024
70	"The Burden of Proof"	TBA	Cam Collins and Steve Shell	May 30, 2024

=== Season 5 (2024–25) ===
No.	Title	Length	Written by	Original release date
71	"Season Five Prologue"	TBA	Steve Shell and Cam Collins	December 5, 2024
72	"Strange Visitations"	TBA	Steve Shell	December 19, 2024
73	"The Blood of Wolves"	TBA	Steve Shell and Cam Collins	January 2, 2025
74	"The Good Shepherd"	TBA	Steve Shell and Cam Collins	January 16, 2025
75	"Logistics and Provisions"	TBA	Steve Shell and Cam Collins	January 30, 2025
76	"The Good Son"	TBA	Steve Shell and Cam Collins	February 13, 2025
77	"Brothers in Arms"	TBA	Steve Shell and Cam Collins	March 6, 2025
78	"The Horror of Babylon"	TBA	Steve Shell and Cam Collins	March 20, 2025
79	"Portrait of Authority"	TBA	Steve Shell and Cam Collins	April 3, 2025
80	"Change of Plans"	TBA	Steve Shell	April 17, 2025
81	"Gone Fishing"	TBA	Cam Collins	May 8, 2025
82	"Cold Call"	TBA	Cam Collins	May 22, 2025
83	"Field Training"	TBA	Cam Collins and Steve Shell	June 5, 2025
84	"Hardball"	TBA	Cam Collins and Steve Shell	July 3, 2025
85	"When You're Strange"	TBA	Steve Shell	July 10, 2025
86	"Cry Little Sister"	TBA	Steve Shell and Cam Collins	July 24, 2025
86	"Say Hello to the Night"	TBA	Cam Collins, Steve Shell, and NitaJade	August 7, 2025
88	"Good Times"	TBA	Steve Shell and Cam Collins	August 21, 2025
89	"Lost in the Shadows"	TBA	Cam Collins, Steve Shell, and NitaJade	September 4, 2025
90	"When the Darkness Comes"	TBA	Cam Collins, Steve Shell, and NitaJade	September 18, 2025

=== Season 6 ===
No.	Title	Length	Written by	Original release date
91	"Season Six Prologue"	TBA	Steve Shell	January 15, 2026
92	"Excursus I"	TBA	Cam Collins	January 29, 2026
93	"The Woman in Room Sixteen"	TBA	Steve Shell	February 12, 2026
94	"Phantoms in the Early Dark"	TBA	Steve Shell	February 26, 2026
95	"The Second Death"	TBA	Steve Shell	March 12, 2026
96	"Lessons Learned"	TBA	Steve Shell and Cam Collins	March 26, 2026
97	"Excursus II"	TBA	Cam Collins	April 16, 2026
98	"Generation of Vipers"	TBA	Steve Shell and Cam Collins	April 30, 2026
99	"Master of Doors"	TBA	Steve Shell and Cam Collins	May 14, 2026
100	"One Way Ticket"	TBA	Steve Shell and Cam Collins	May 28, 2026
101	"Keeper of Ways"	TBA	Steve Shell and Cam Collins	June 11, 2026
102	"Hour of the Ouroboros"	TBA	Steve Shell and Cam Collins	June 25, 2026
103	"Final Arbitration"	TBA	Steve Shell and Cam Collins	July 9, 2026
104	"Excursus III"	TBA	Cam Collins	July 30, 2026
105	"The Builder"	TBA	Cam Collins and Steve Shell	August 13, 2026
106	"The Bride"	TBA	Cam Collins	August 27, 2026
107	"The Acolyte"	TBA	Cam Collins	September 10, 2026
108	"The Offering"	TBA	Cam Collins	September 24, 2026
109	"The Beast"	TBA	Cam Collins	October 8, 2026

== Reception ==
Toni Oisin of Collider praised the show saying that "the style the script is written in is gripping, making it hard to switch off after the first episode." Aysel Atamdede of 60 Seconds Magazine praised the show saying that the podcast contains "immersive, wonderfully written, lovingly narrated stories." A reader's pick on Vulture written by Eli L. praised the show saying that "it captures the spirit of Appalachia in a way that makes me nostalgic … in addition to keeping me jumping at shadows!"

=== Awards ===
Date	Award	Category	Recipient	Result	Ref.
2022	World Fantasy Awards	Special Award – Professional	Cam Collins and Steve Shell for Old Gods of Appalachia	Nominated	
2021	Discover Pod Awards	Best Overall Podcast	Old Gods of Appalachia	Won	
2021	Discover Pod Awards	Audio Drama or Fiction Podcast	Old Gods of Appalachia	Won	
2021	Audio Verse Awards	Overall Storytelling Production for an Existing Production	Old Gods of Appalachia	Won	
2021	Audio Verse Awards	Cover Art for an Existing Production	Old Gods of Appalachia	Won	
2021	Audio Verse Awards	Writing for an Existing Storytelling Production	Cam Collins and Steve Shell	Won	
2021	Audio Verse Awards	Storyteller in an Existing Production	Steve Shell	Won	
2021	Audio Verse Awards	Music Direction in an Existing Storytelling Production	Steve Shell	Won	
2021	Audio Verse Awards	Environmental and Action Sound Design in an Existing Storytelling Production	Steve Shell	Won	
2021	Audio Verse Awards	Original Vocal Composition in an Existing Storytelling Production	"The Land Unknown (The Hollow Heart Verses)" by Landon Blood for Old Gods of Appalachia	Won	
2020	Discover Pod Awards	Audio Drama or Fiction Podcast	Old Gods of Appalachia	Runner-up	
2020	Audio Verse Awards	Overall Storytelling Production for a New Production	Old Gods of Appalachia	Won	
2020	Audio Verse Awards	Writing of a New Storytelling Production	Cam Collins and Steve Shell	Won	
2020	Audio Verse Awards	Storyteller in a New Production	Steve Shell	Won	
2020	Audio Verse Awards	Environmental and Action Sound Design in a New Storytelling Production	Steve Shell	Won	
2020	Audio Verse Awards	Original Vocal Composition in a New Storytelling Production	"The Land Unknown" by Landon Blood for Old Gods of Appalachia	Won	
2020	Audio Verse Awards	Performance of a Leading Role in a New Audio Play Production	Betsy Puckett in Old Gods of Appalachia: Build Mama a Coffin	Won	

== Adaptation ==
The creation of the roleplaying game based on the Old Gods of Appalachia was formally announced on November 12, 2021. The show was adapted by Monte Cook Games.
