= Jonathan Sims =

Writer and voice actor

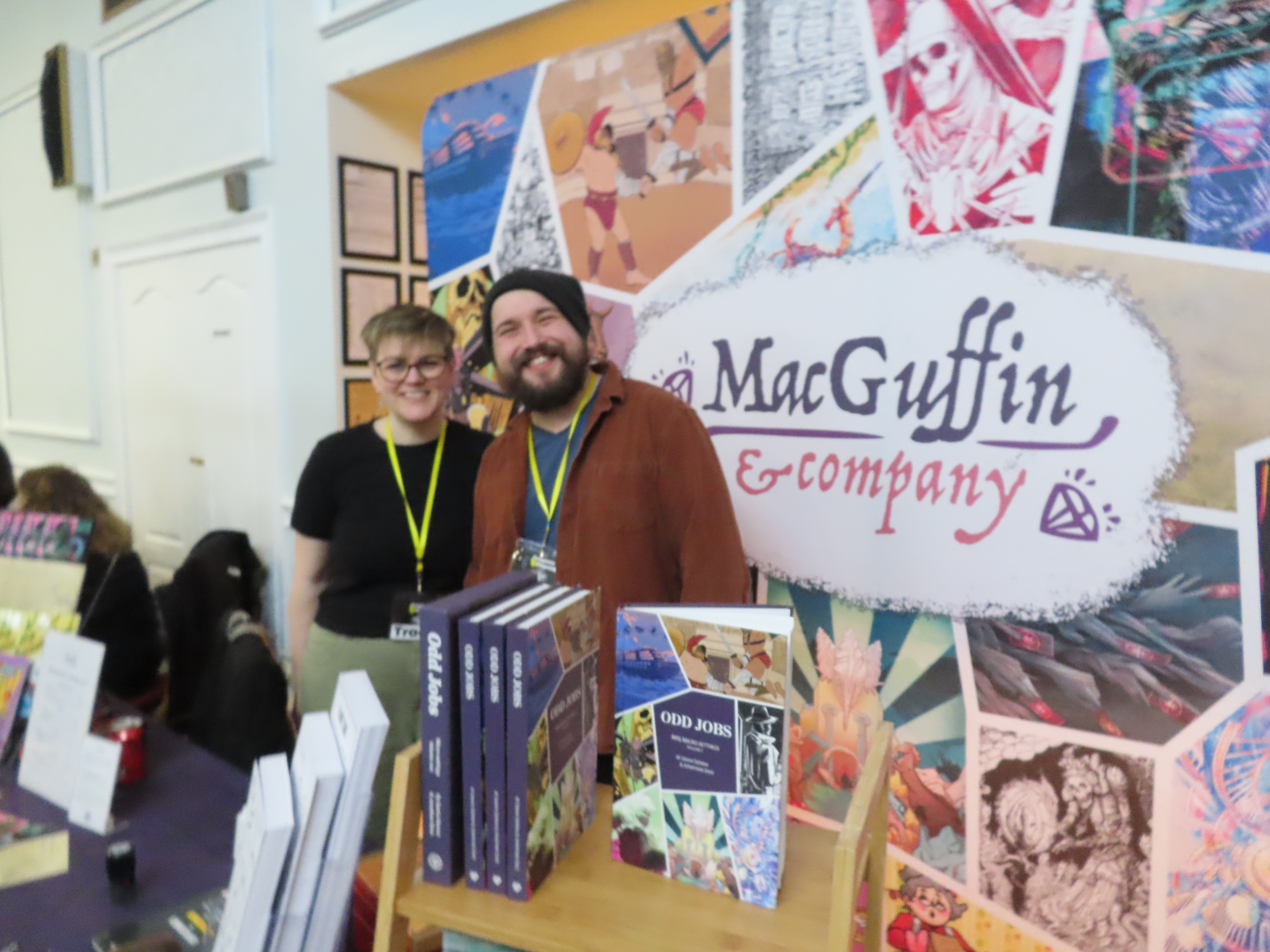
- Sasha Sienna and Jonathan Sims at Dungeons and Flagons, December 2024
- Occupations: Writer; Voice Actor; Novelist
- Writing career
- Period: 2016 - Present
- Genres: gothic horror; existential horror; fantasy; science-fiction; social commentary
- Notable works: The Magnus Archives; Thirteen Storeys; Family Business
- Notable awards: Performance of a Leading Role in an Audio Play Production (Audio Verse Awards 2019, 2020, 2021); Writing of an Audio Play Production (Audio Verse Awards 2019, 2020, 2021); Best New Production (Audio Verse Awards 2024, shared with Alexander J. Newall); Best Writing in a New Production (Audio Verse Awards 2024, shared with multiple co-writers)
- Website: jonathan-sims.com

Jonathan Sims is a British author, voice actor, musician, and games designer. He is popularly known for creating The Magnus Archives, a horror anthology audio drama.

== Career ==
=== Acting ===
During his time as a student in St Hilda's College, Oxford, Sims took part in amateur dramatics as part of the Oxford University Light Entertainment Society (OULES), which is billed as "Oxford's least serious drama society".

In 2010, Sims was part of the initial line-up for a music group called The Mechanisms, a self-styled "Storytelling Musical Cabaret". Sims acted as lead singer, performing under the name Jonny D'Ville. Sims primarily acted as the narrator for performances, where classical stories such as the Odyssey and the legend of King Arthur were re-framed in steampunk, western and cyberpunk settings. Sims co-wrote lyrics for several songs in subsequent albums. The Mechanisms disbanded in 2020, after a final album entitled Death to the Mechanisms.

Sims created and launched the podcast The Magnus Archives in 2016, and served as its head writer, presenter, and voice actor. Sims played a fictionalised version of himself: Jonathan Sims, Head Archivist of the Magnus Institute, a character who reads out disturbing and unusual cases that have been submitted to The Magnus Institute Archives. In development, the audio drama had been initially proposed as a simple anthology of spooky stories, but gradually developed to include a meta-plot. Over time the fictional version of Sims diverged completely from the real-world Sims. The podcast reached 100 million downloads on Spotify in 2025.

In 2023, Sims was cast as The Voice of the Narrator and The Voices in Your Head for the acclaimed indie game Slay the Princess, acting alongside Nichole Goodnight. In the game, Sims demonstrates a wide range of vocal performances for multiple distinct characters which resulted in widespread praise from the gaming community.

In November 2022, a Kickstarter campaign was run to fund a sequel for The Magnus Archives, called The Magnus Protocol. The aim was to raise £15,000 (USD). The final value raised was £718,641, more than any podcast had yet raised in crowdfunding history.

In 2024, The Magnus Protocol began its run, releasing 30 episodes for Season 1, with Season 2 beginning in February 2025. The show is co-written by Sims and Alexander J Newall, and presents a "side-quel" to The Magnus Archives, focused on Samama "Sam" Khalid, Alice Dyer, Gwen Bouchard, Celia Ripley, and Colin Becher, hapless employees of The Office of Incident Assessment and Response (OIAR), a fictional Civil Service department in London.

Sims' other voice acting roles include Dr. John Seward in Re:Dracula, Alf in The Silt Verses, the Stenographer/Narrator in Super Suits.

In addition to formal voice acting roles, Sims also narrates classic ghost and horror stories on his Bandcamp, Twitch, and YouTube accounts.

=== Tabletop role-playing games ===
In 2015, Sims and his partner Sasha Sienna launched a self-owned tabletop role-playing game (TTRPG) business called MacGuffin & Company. The company writes and publishes system-neutral micro-settings. These are short TTRPG campaign settings designed to be used with any game system, such as Pathfinder or Call of Cthulhu. Their first published collection Odd Jobs won ‘Best Roleplaying Game Adventure’ Award at the 2022 UK Games Expo, and was nominated for ‘Product of the Year’ at that year's ENNIES Awards. In addition to producing games for sale, the company has a Patreon where Sims and Sienna release early content, one-shot campaigns, and provide a course on how to be a Gamemaster or GM.

Sims has also appeared on multiple podcasts about TTRPGs or live-play podcasts, where such games are played for the audience's enjoyment.

=== Books ===
Sims has published three horror novels with Gollancz Ltd. His debut novel, Thirteen Storeys, was published in 2020. The novel expands on the concept of a haunted house by setting the tale in a haunted block of flats in London. The novel explores the relationship between the wealthy "haves", who rent the luxurious flats at the front of the building, and the disempowered "have-nots" who rent the cheap flats, and enter via a back door.

Sims' second novel, Family Business, was published in 2022, and centres around the horror of grief and whose memory is upheld by society. The central character, Diya, starts a new job after the loss of a close friend. She begins working for a family (Slough & Sons) who provide specialist cleaning services after death: domestic, forensic, and otherwise. However, things quickly become strange as she cannot remember details of the deceased clients.

After his first two novels, Sims signed the world rights to another two novels to Gollancz. Sims' third novel, The Burn Line, was published in July 2026. Described as his "breakup letter to London", Burnout is a horror story set in modern London during the 2022 heatwave, making things uncomfortable for a group of residents stuck on the London Underground. When pitching his new novel, Sims told his editor "did you know there's a legal maximum temperature that cows can be transported at, but not humans?".

=== Other writing ===
Sims has written science-fiction, co-writing ‘’Of that Colossal Wreck’’ with Sienna, for Season 1 of the Neon Inkwell podcast series. The series follows a group of people waking up alone on a vast space station, figuring out what to do and how to be, when most of humanity seems to have gone the way of Ozymandias.

Sims has contributed to the Zombies, Run! fitness app by writing a scenario called The Graveyard Run, featuring ghost stories based around English history. He has also contributed writing to historical fiction podcast Outliers and collections of short stories, Curtains and Great British Horror: Major Arcana. Sims has written a short audio drama, Sea Smoke, for Big Finish Productions as part of their Halloween Doctor Who Box Set.

== Themes and style ==
Sims has stated his narrative style and The Magnus Archives were heavily inspired by a childhood spent reading The Collected Ghost Stories of M. R. James. The Magnus Archives were named after his favourite story from this collection, "Count Magnus". Sims is a fan of horror movies and frequently gives characters surnames based on horror authors or characters.

Sims has been described as having "the most phenomenal skill of finding the human stories that make his horror really hit home. He has an uncanny ability to tap into the deepest innate fears and use them to shine a mirror on society.".

== Personal life ==
Sims lives in Manchester with his spouse, Sasha Sienna, and the "two best cats in the world", Ser Pouncealot and The Ambassador.
