= We're Alive, A Story of Survival =

Horror podcast

We're Alive — A Story of Survival
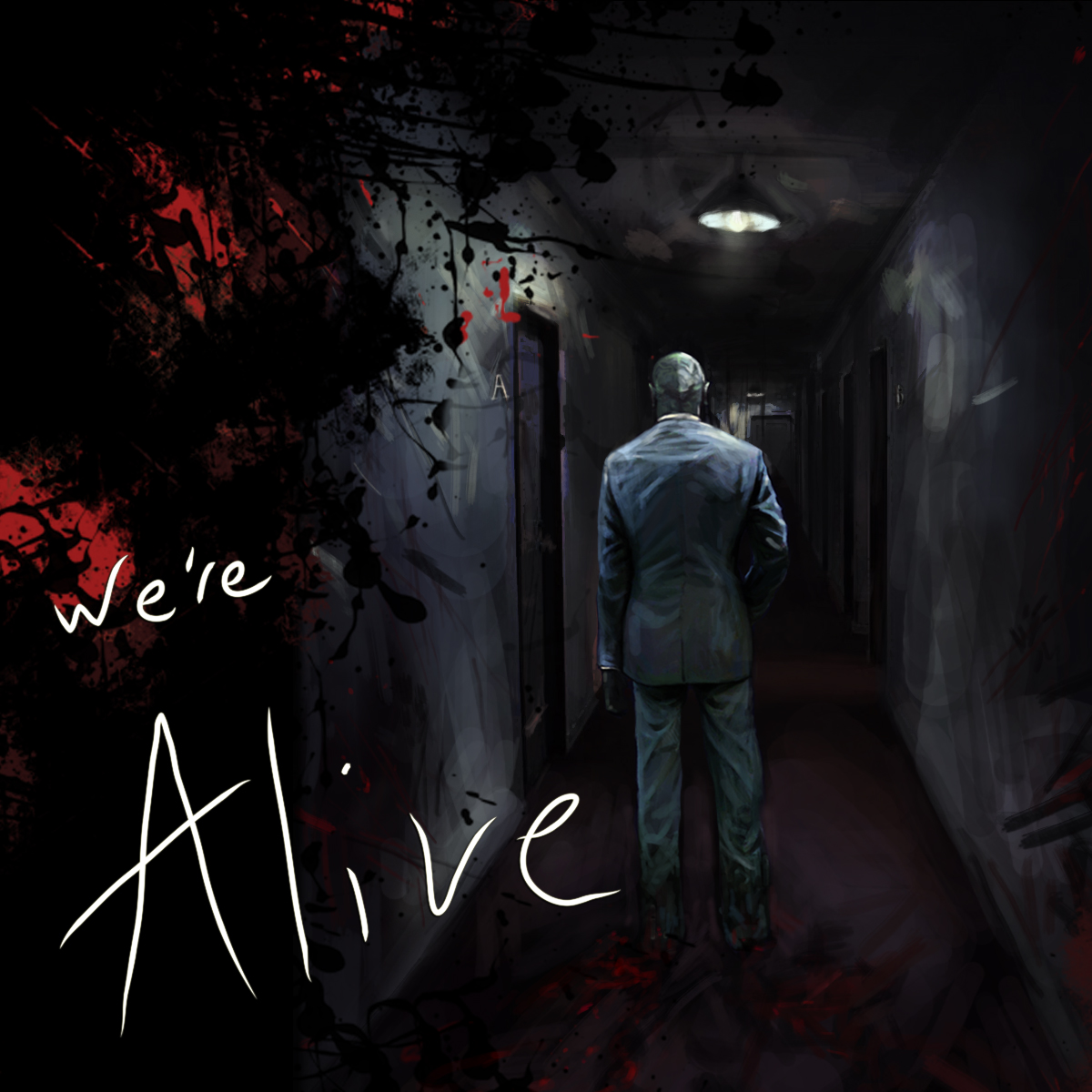
- Language: English

Cast and voices
- Starring: Ensemble cast

Production
- Production: Kc Wayland; Grayson Stone
- Length: 20-30 minutes

Technical specifications
- Audio format: Stereophonic/MP3

Publication
- No. of seasons: 4
- No. of episodes: 166
- Original release: May 04, 2009 – July 29, 2014
- Updates: completed

Related
- Website: http://www.zombiepodcast.com

We're Alive — A Story of Survival is a horror/post apocalyptic audio drama, originally released in podcast form. Its story follows a large group of survivors of a zombie apocalypse in downtown Los Angeles, California.

We're Alive premiered May 4, 2009 on iTunes, and concluded its fourth and last season on July 29, 2014. When in production, the We're Alive series released 3 first-run episodes a month, totaling 36 episodes a season. The compiled-season version of the show is produced by Wayland Productions, and is distributed through CD/Digital downloads by Blackstone Audio and also through the Rusty Quill Network.

== Background ==
We're Alive started early in 2009 when creator, Kc Wayland, originally outlined the story for a pitch for television. At the time he saw there was a gap in programming that could be filled by a horror survival series. He designed a show that would take advantage of the repeated set, the tower, and then branch out from there as the show would get more popular. After the initial story and character outlines were created, he then proceeded to talk with other film producers seeing if there would be a way to get the show on broadcast television.

After not being able to successfully pitch the idea, Wayland then decided to produce the show as an audio drama. The concept for self-production was a "if you build it, they will come"; in regards to both listeners and producers. In late April 2009, Wayland met with Shane Salk and pitched the idea. Together they settled on the serialized audio format. Wayland and Salk went on to produce the first two seasons, and then Grayson Stone (an intern in season 1 and 2) and Wayland continued to produce the final two seasons.

== Sequels and Spinoffs ==
In 2015, Wayland announced a follow-up podcast mini-series titled We're Alive: Lockdown. The project was crowdfunded through Kickstarter, raising $54,774 of its $50,000 goal. Lockdown takes place within Twin Towers Jail. Six inmates, and the prison guards assigned to them have found themselves trapped in the inescapable confines of T-block during the lockdown following a prison riot. Boundaries of trust are pushed to the limit as the survivors must learn to work together if they have any hope of escaping the horde of infected and the deadly secret that lies within the walls of Twin Tower Jail.

In 2019, Wayland released a new follow-up chapter to the series titled We're Alive: Goldrush. This entry in the We’re Alive canon is described as a “spaghetti-western tale of humor, horror and heartbreak”. The series follows four post-apocalyptic soldiers as they stumble across clues to a hidden gold heist stash. Since gold retains value even after the apocalypse, they plot to track down the prize for themselves. Goldrush was shortlisted as a BBC Audio Drama Award for best podcast.

Since late 2019, hints and were shared on the official We’re Alive website and by Writer/Director Kc Wayland on social media regarding a true sequel to the show entitled We’re Alive: Descendants. According to Wayland the writing for this show has been ongoing since We’re Alive: A Story of Survival concluded in 2014. We're Alive: Descendants episode 1 released on April 5, 2022 and the final episode of season 1 aired on March 28, 2023. Season 2 of Descendants is set to release on February 25, 2025.

Spinoff series We're Alive: Scouts Honour follows a group of campers as they struggle to survive the outbreak, described by the production team as "Lord of the flies meets zombies". The series was announced on March 15, 2024, and ran from March 19 to May 7, 2024. Notably, it was released on its own podcast feed, unlike the other spinoffs.

== Format ==
There were several factors that led Wayland to the audio-only format. In limiting the visuals, the story would be able to explore limitless possibilities in settings and situations not fully explored by this genre. Being a "horror", the power of sound and "what you can't see" could be utilized in a powerful way. Using no visuals also limited the vastness of production. Actors could come in once every two months for a full day of recording that would cover six full episodes (2 chapters).

== Production process ==
A typical chapter is about sixty pages long, and is recorded by the actors in a recording stage in Orange County, CA. A typical day runs about six to eight hours of raw recording. From there, a voice cutter then goes through the session and separates just the usable lines, and then passes it onto another editor who then lays in the initial sound effects and pacing. The last stage then goes back to Wayland, who acts as the supervising sound editor and covers the last stage of production, often doing a large amount of foley and music selections.

== Release dates and episode length ==
In a typical month, We're Alive produced three episodes comprising one chapter, taking one week off between chapters. Twelve chapters make up one season, and there are four seasons with a total of forty eight chapters. Each episode is approximately twenty minutes, making each chapter about an hour long.

== Published version ==
Blackstone Audio has published all three seasons currently available: Season 1, Season 2, Season 3.

== Awards ==
We're Alive was nominated in 2012 for the Best Audio Drama in the Audio Publishing Awards. In the same year, it was named "Best of 2012" in the iTunes Arts category. Other awards won by the series include:

- 4th Annual Dead Letter Award
- 2009 Gold Ogle Award
- 2010 Silver Ogle Award
- Parsec Award Winner Best Speculative Fiction Audio Drama Long Form 2014
- Parsec Award Finalist Best Speculative Fiction Audio Drama Long Form 2010 2011, 2012, and 2013

== Cast ==
- Jim Gleason as Michael
- Shane Salk as Angel
- Nate Geez as Saul
- Elisa Eliot as Pegs
- Claire Dodin as Riley
- Scott Marvin as Burt
- Tammy Klein as Kelly
- Jay Olegario as Datu
- Blaire Byhower/Blaire Wayland as Lizzy
- Kevin Flood as Kalani
- Jenna McCombie as Scratch
- Bob Bergen as Skittles
- Ben Jurand as Durai
- Mark Jeffrey Miller as Gatekeeper
- Shirley Jordan as Tanya
- Otto Sturcke as Victor
- Greg Miller as Pete
- Carl Schwaber as Bixby
- Cooper Wise as Supervisor
- Jim Kane as Marcus
- Katie Keane as Amy
- Erik Wargo as Steven
- Glenn Hoeffner as Glenn
- David Pevsner as Tardust
- Stuart Kennon as Bricks
- Manley Woods as Bill
- Nico Marvin as Tommy
- Rebekah Roberts as Samantha
- Michael Ray Clarke as Latch
- Omar Leyva as Fernando
- Richard Tatum as Pippin
- Brett Newton as Puck
- Christian Vieira as Carl Thomas
- Constance Parng as Chinwei AKA C.J.
- Julia Kelly as Hannah
- Tony Rey as Robbins
- Shaun Lewin as Muldoon
- Graham Beightol as Max
- James Stebick as Jay

=== Notable guest voices ===
In addition the regular cast — which includes Jim Gleason who starred on the 2013–2014 season of American Horror Story — there have been a number of notable guest voices on We're Alive. These names include Bob Bergen (current voice of Porky Pig), Seth Peterson from Burn Notice, and Greg Miller.

== Episodes ==
=== Season 1 ===
No. overall	No. in season	Title	Length	Original release date
1	1	"Chapter 1: It Begins - Part 1 of 3"	00:19:11	May 4, 2009
2	2	"Chapter 1: It Begins - Part 2 of 3"	00:13:30	May 11, 2009
3	3	"Chapter 1: It Begins - Part 3 of 3"	00:17:41	May 18, 2009
4	4	"Chapter 2: The Two Things - Part 1 of 3"	00:19:01	June 7, 2009
5	5	"Chapter 2: The Two Things - Part 2 of 3"	00:16:49	June 15, 2009
6	6	"Chapter 2: The Two Things - Part 3 of 3"	00:24:16	June 22, 2009
7	7	"Chapter 3: The New Arrivals - Part 1 of 3"	00:21:10	July 6, 2009
8	8	"Chapter 3: The New Arrivals - Part 2 of 3"	00:15:12	July 13, 2009
9	9	"Chapter 3: The New Arrivals - Part 3 of 3"	00:16:46	July 20, 2009
10	10	"Chapter 4: Rules and Regulations - Part 1 of 3"	00:21:52	August 3, 2009
11	11	"Chapter 4: Rules and Regulations - Part 2 of 3"	00:16:01	August 10, 2009
12	12	"Chapter 4: Rules and Regulations - Part 3 of 3"	00:21:19	August 17, 2009
13	13	"Chapter 5: Lady and the Tink - Part 1 of 3"	00:18:30	August 30, 2009
14	14	"Chapter 5: Lady and the Tink - Part 2 of 3"	00:18:45	September 7, 2009
15	15	"Chapter 5: Lady and the Tink - Part 3 of 3"	00:12:29	September 14, 2009
16	16	"Chapter 6: The Remains of Eastern Bay - Part 1 of 3"	00:16:27	September 28, 2009
17	17	"Chapter 6: The Remains of Eastern Bay - Part 2 of 3"	00:23:57	October 5, 2009
18	18	"Chapter 6: The Remains of Eastern Bay - Part 3 of 3"	00:23:55	October 12, 2009
19	19	"Chapter 7: Blood Sweat and Fears - Part 1 of 3"	00:19:01	October 26, 2009
20	20	"Chapter 7: Blood Sweat and Fears - Part 2 of 3"	00:16:20	November 2, 2009
21	21	"Chapter 7: Blood Sweat and Fears - Part 3 of 3"	00:20:55	November 9, 2009
22	22	"Chapter 8: Where Do You Go When You Sleep? - Part 1 of 3"	00:16:26	November 23, 2009
23	23	"Chapter 8: Where Do You Go When You Sleep? - Part 2 of 3"	00:13:15	December 7, 2009
24	24	"Chapter 8: Where Do You Go When You Sleep? - Part 3 of 3"	00:18:59	December 14, 2009
25	25	"Chapter 9: The Road to Living Death - Part 1 of 3"	00:19:17	December 28, 2009
26	26	"Chapter 9: The Road to Living Death - Part 2 of 3"	00:14:09	January 11, 2010
27	27	"Chapter 9: The Road to Living Death - Part 3 of 3"	00:13:02	January 18, 2010
28	28	"Chapter 10: Purgatory - Part 1 of 3"	00:25:14	February 1, 2010
29	29	"Chapter 10: Purgatory - Part 2 of 3"	00:23:46	February 8, 2010
30	30	"Chapter 10: Purgatory - Part 3 of 3"	00:19:35	February 15, 2010
31	31	"Chapter 11: R&R - Part 1 of 3"	00:19:17	March 1, 2010
32	32	"Chapter 11: R&R - Part 2 of 3"	00:19:18	March 8, 2010
33	33	"Chapter 11: R&R - Part 3 of 3"	00:20:44	March 15, 2010
34	34	"Chapter 12: The War - Part 1 of 4"	00:18:22	March 29, 2010
35	35	"Chapter 12: The War - Part 2 of 4"	00:18:07	April 5, 2010
36	36	"Chapter 12: The War - Part 3 of 4"	00:16:40	April 12, 2010
37	37	"Chapter 12: The War - Part 4 of 4"	00:26:50	April 19, 2010
38	TBA	"Season 1 Recap - Part 1"	00:17:13	August 16, 2010
39	TBA	"Season 1 Recap - Part 2"	00:18:57	August 16, 2010

=== Season 2 ===
No. overall	No. in season	Title	Length	Original release date
40	1	"Chapter 13: Separate Dying Embers - Part 1 of 3"	00:18:26	August 23, 2010
41	2	"Chapter 13: Separate Dying Embers - Part 2 of 3"	00:19:42	August 30, 2010
42	3	"Chapter 13: Separate Dying Embers - Part 3 of 3"	00:14:21	September 6, 2010
43	4	"Chapter 14: Out of the Ashes - Part 1 of 3"	00:17:55	September 20, 2010
44	5	"Chapter 14: Out of the Ashes - Part 2 of 3"	00:22:24	September 27, 2010
45	6	"Chapter 14: Out of the Ashes - Part 3 of 3"	00:15:03	October 4, 2010
46	7	"Chapter 15: Desperate Times - Part 1 of 3"	00:23:19	October 18, 2010
47	8	"Chapter 15: Desperate Times - Part 2 of 3"	00:19:37	October 25, 2010
48	9	"Chapter 15: Desperate Times - Part 3 of 3"	00:15:35	November 1, 2010
49	10	"Chapter 16: Over the Air-Waves - Part 1 of 3"	00:17:25	November 15, 2010
50	11	"Chapter 16: Over the Air-Waves - Part 2 of 3"	00:16:38	November 22, 2010
51	12	"Chapter 16: Over the Air-Waves - Part 3 of 3"	00:18:03	December 6, 2010
52	13	"Chapter 17: There Might Be Others - Part 1 of 3"	00:20:57	December 20, 2010
53	14	"Chapter 17: There Might Be Others - Part 2 of 3"	00:20:57	January 3, 2011
54	15	"Chapter 17: There Might Be Others - Part 3 of 3"	00:20:35	January 10, 2011
55	16	"Chapter 18: No Place Like Home - Part 1 of 3"	00:21:55	January 24, 2011
56	17	"Chapter 18: No Place Like Home - Part 2 of 3"	00:18:36	January 31, 2011
57	18	"Chapter 18: No Place Like Home - Part 3 of 3"	00:17:20	February 7, 2011
58	19	"Chapter 19: The Catalyst - Part 1 of 3"	00:24:09	February 21, 2011
59	20	"Chapter 19: The Catalyst - Part 2 of 3"	00:24:42	February 28, 2011
60	21	"Chapter 19: The Catalyst - Part 3 of 3"	00:26:32	March 7, 2011
61	22	"Chapter 20: About Last Night - Part 1 of 3"	00:16:56	March 21, 2011
62	23	"Chapter 20: About Last Night - Part 2 of 3"	00:18:10	March 28, 2011
63	24	"Chapter 20: About Last Night - Part 3 of 3"	00:22:00	April 4, 2011
64	25	"Chapter 21: Mark of the Beast - Part 1 of 3"	00:21:56	April 25, 2011
65	26	"Chapter 21: Mark of the Beast - Part 2 of 3"	00:20:51	May 2, 2011
66	27	"Chapter 21: Mark of the Beast - Part 3 of 3"	00:16:33	May 9, 2011
67	28	"Chapter 22: Our Doubts are Traitors - Part 1 of 3"	00:18:04	May 23, 2011
68	29	"Chapter 22: Our Doubts are Traitors - Part 2 of 3"	00:21:19	May 30, 2011
69	30	"Chapter 22: Our Doubts are Traitors - Part 3 of 3"	00:17:01	June 6, 2011
70	31	"Chapter 23: The Devil's Workshop - Part 1 of 3"	00:22:29	June 20, 2011
71	32	"Chapter 23: The Devil's Workshop - Part 2 of 3"	00:17:30	June 27, 2011
72	33	"Chapter 23: The Devil's Workshop - Part 3 of 3"	00:20:00	July 11, 2011
73	34	"Chapter 24: The Harder they Fall"	00:52:31	July 30, 2011
74	TBA	"Season 2 Recap"	03:38:28	July 31, 2011

=== Season 3 ===
No. overall	No. in season	Title	Length	Original release date
75	1	"Chapter 25: Inadequate Strength - Part 1 of 3"	00:17:33	January 2, 2012
76	2	"Chapter 25: Inadequate Strength - Part 2 of 3"	00:24:17	January 9, 2012
77	3	"Chapter 25: Inadequate Strength - Part 3 of 3"	00:16:01	January 15, 2012
78	4	"Chapter 26: Who Overcomes... - Part 1 of 3"	00:21:49	January 30, 2012
79	5	"Chapter 26: Who Overcomes... - Part 2 of 3"	00:19:29	February 6, 2012
80	6	"Chapter 26: Who Overcomes... - Part 3 of 3"	00:21:16	February 13, 2012
81	7	"Chapter 27: The Thirty-First - Part 1 of 3"	00:23:41	March 5, 2012
82	8	"Chapter 27: The Thirty-First - Part 2 of 3"	00:24:44	March 12, 2012
83	9	"Chapter 27: The Thirty-First - Part 3 of 3"	00:17:38	March 19, 2012
84	10	"Chapter 28: Last Dying Breath - Part 1 of 3"	00:30:07	April 2, 2012
85	11	"Chapter 28: Last Dying Breath - Part 2 of 3"	00:20:52	April 9, 2012
86	12	"Chapter 28: Last Dying Breath - Part 2 of 3"	00:24:05	April 16, 2012
87	13	"Chapter 29: Beyond Our Walls - Part 1 of 3"	00:19:03	April 30, 2012
88	14	"Chapter 29: Beyond Our Walls - Part 2 of 3"	00:20:01	May 7, 2012
89	15	"Chapter 29: Beyond Our Walls - Part 3 of 3"	00:21:45	May 14, 2012
90	16	"Chapter 30: Short Term Memory - Part 1 of 3"	00:21:13	May 28, 2012
91	17	"Chapter 30: Short Term Memory - Part 2 of 3"	00:21:01	June 11, 2012
92	18	"Chapter 30: Short Term Memory - Part 3 of 3"	00:20:05	June 18, 2012
93	19	"Chapter 31: Family Ties - Part 1 of 3"	00:25:21	July 2, 2012
94	20	"Chapter 31: Family Ties - Part 2 of 3"	00:20:04	July 9, 2012
95	21	"Chapter 31: Family Ties - Part 3 of 3"	00:18:22	July 16, 2012
96	22	"Chapter 32: Captive Hearts - Part 1 of 3"	00:27:26	August 6, 2012
97	23	"Chapter 32: Captive Hearts - Part 2 of 3"	00:23:35	August 13, 2012
98	24	"Chapter 32: Captive Hearts - Part 3 of 3"	00:18:43	August 20, 2012
99	25	"Chapter 33: Red Winter - Part 1 of 3"	00:26:15	September 3, 2012
100	26	"Chapter 33: Red Winter - Part 2 of 3"	00:19:14	September 10, 2012
101	27	"Chapter 33: Red Winter - Part 3 of 3"	00:23:15	September 17, 2012
102	28	"Chapter 34: It Only Takes One - Part 1 of 3"	00:20:27	October 1, 2012
103	29	"Chapter 34: It Only Takes One - Part 2 of 3"	00:23:41	October 8, 2012
104	30	"Chapter 34: It Only Takes One - Part 3 of 3"	00:19:16	October 15, 2012
105	31	"Chapter 35: The End is Near - Part 1 of 3"	00:19:59	October 29, 2012
106	32	"Chapter 35: The End is Near - Part 2 of 3"	00:31:44	November 5, 2012
107	33	"Chapter 35: The End is Near - Part 3 of 3"	00:22:36	November 12, 2012
108	34	"Chapter 36: Scorched Earth"	00:54:03	December 5, 2012
109	TBA	"Season 3 Recap"	01:52:01	August 12, 2013

=== Season 4 ===
No. overall	No. in season	Title	Length	Original release date
110	1	"Chapter 37: Balance of Power - Part 1 of 3"	00:21:33	August 26, 2013
111	2	"Chapter 37: Balance of Power - Part 2 of 3"	00:20:32	September 2, 2013
112	3	"Chapter 37: Balance of Power - Part 3 of 3"	00:29:21	September 9, 2013
113	4	"Chapter 38: Unity Makes Strength - Part 1 of 3"	00:22:34	September 23, 2013
114	5	"Chapter 38: Unity Makes Strength - Part 2 of 3"	00:23:03	September 30, 2013
115	6	"Chapter 38: Unity Makes Strength - Part 3 of 3"	00:26:20	October 7, 2013
116	7	"Chapter 39: Chemical Reactions - Part 1 of 3"	00:24:11	October 21, 2013
117	8	"Chapter 38: Chemical Reactions - Part 2 of 3"	00:29:40	October 28, 2013
118	9	"Chapter 39: Chemical Reactions - Part 3 of 3"	00:23:57	November 4, 2013
119	10	"Chapter 40: Monsters - Part 1 of 3"	00:24:40	November 18, 2013
120	11	"Chapter 40: Monsters - Part 2 of 3"	00:24:55	November 25, 2013
121	12	"Chapter 40: Monsters - Part 3 of 3"	00:19:27	December 2, 2013
122	13	"Chapter 41: Eye of the Storm - Part 1 of 3"	00:28:26	December 16, 2013
123	14	"Chapter 41: Eye of the Storm - Part 2 of 3"	00:24:50	December 30, 2013
124	15	"Chapter 41: Eye of the Storm - Part 3 of 3"	00:25:57	January 6, 2014
125	16	"Chapter 42: Chasing Ghosts - Part 1 of 3"	00:23:23	January 20, 2014
126	17	"Chapter 42: Chasing Ghosts - Part 2 of 3"	00:18:22	January 27, 2014
127	18	"Chapter 42: Chasing Ghosts - Part 3 of 3"	00:28:34	February 3, 2014
128	19	"Chapter 43: The Darkness Ahead - Part 1 of 3"	00:30:35	February 24, 2014
129	20	"Chapter 43: The Darkness Ahead - Part 2 of 3"	00:24:11	March 3, 2014
130	21	"Chapter 43: The Darkness Ahead - Part 3 of 3"	00:25:25	March 10, 2014
131	22	"Chapter 44: Life and Death - Part 1 of 3"	00:18:02	March 24, 2014
132	23	"Chapter 44: Life and Death - Part 2 of 3"	00:21:52	March 31, 2014
133	24	"Chapter 44: Life and Death - Part 3 of 3"	00:25:10	April 7, 2014
134	25	"Chapter 45: Distorted Truths - Part 1 of 3"	00:23:14	April 21, 2014
135	26	"Chapter 45: Distorted Truths - Part 2 of 3"	00:31:23	April 28, 2014
136	27	"Chapter 45: Distorted Truths - Part 3 of 3"	00:22:06	May 5, 2014
137	28	"Chapter 46: Under the Pressure - Part 1 of 3"	00:25:44	May 19, 2014
138	29	"Chapter 46: Under the Pressure - Part 2 of 3"	00:26:03	May 26, 2014
139	30	"Chapter 46: Under the Pressure - Part 3 of 3"	00:22:41	June 2, 2014
140	31	"Chapter 47: The Lion's Den - Part 1 of 3"	00:24:04	June 16, 2014
141	32	"Chapter 47: The Lion's Den - Part 2 of 3"	00:26:03	June 23, 2014
142	33	"Chapter 47: The Lion's Den - Part 3 of 3"	00:24:03	June 30, 2014
143	34	"Chapter 48: The Ink Runs Dry"	01:11:05	July 29, 2014
