= Horror podcast =

Podcast genre

"Staircase", an episode from Knifepoint Horror (29:52)

A horror podcast is a podcast that covers fiction, non-fiction, or reviews of the horror genre generally.

== History ==
Horror podcasts are typically created and run by volunteers in their free time. As some podcasts such as Archive 81 and The Deep Vault have grown they have been able to attract advertisers. The world's longest running, active horror podcast is WithoutYourHead.com which has been going since August 2006 as a semi-regular weekly series with celebrity interviews. Horror podcasts have featured in the Parsec Awards, and in 2013 The NoSleep Podcast won the award for "Best New Speculative Fiction Podcaster/Team" while in 2014 a story from Pseudopod won the award for "Best Speculative Fiction Story: Small Cast (Short Form)" and We're Alive won "Best Speculative Fiction Audio Drama (Long Form)".

== Reception ==
Horror fiction an audio drama podcast genera and drives growth and interest in the medium. Horror Fiction podcasting is attracting mainstream success with some shows reaching large audiences. As of July 2020, popular podcast The Magnus Archives recently achieved 4 million monthly downloads and signed with talent agency WME. We're Alive achieved 200 million lifetime downloads as of 10 April 2020.

Amongst responses to the 2020 Audio Verse Awards, horror was the second-favourite genre of fiction podcast. With notable podcasts The White Vault receiving 14 awards, The Magnus Archives receiving 9 awards, and Old Gods of Appalachia receiving 6.

== Notable examples ==
- Alice Isn't Dead
- The Black Tapes
- The Call of the Void
- Lore
- The Lovecraft Investigations
- The Magnus Archives
- The NoSleep Podcast
- Old Gods of Appalachia
- Pseudopod
- Rabbits
- Tanis
- Unexplained
- Welcome to Night Vale
- We're Alive
- The White Vault
- CreepCast

== See also ==
- Horror fiction
- Horror film
- Psychological horror
- List of horror fiction writers
- List of horror podcasts
