= The Magnus Archives =

Horror fiction podcast series

- Genre: Paranormal, supernatural horror, existentialism
- Country of origin: United Kingdom
- Language: English

Creative team
- Written by: Jonathan Sims
- Directed by: Alexander J. Newall

Music
- Composed by: Sam Jones

Production
- Production: Lowri Ann Davies
- Length: 20-30 minutes

Technical specifications
- Audio format: Podcast (via streaming or downloadable MP3)

Publication
- No. of seasons: 5
- No. of episodes: 200
- Original release: 24 March 2016 – 25 March 2021
- Provider: Rusty Quill, Ltd.
- Updates: Weekly
- License: Creative Commons Attribution – NonCommercial – ShareAlike 4.0 International

Reception
- Ratings: 4.9/5

Related
- Website: Official website

The Magnus Archives is a supernatural horror fiction podcast written by Jonathan Sims, directed by Alexander J. Newall, and distributed by Rusty Quill. Sims, voicing a character of the same name, stars as the Head Archivist for the fictional Magnus Institute, a London-based paranormal research institution. "The Magnus Archives is a weekly horror fiction podcast examining what lurks in the archives of the Magnus Institute, an organisation dedicated to researching the esoteric and the weird." Five seasons were released between 2016 and 2021 on various audio streaming services, along with an official subreddit created by Sims: r/TheMagnusArchives.

The series has received critical acclaim for its atmosphere and horror concepts and is the recipient of several podcast awards. A side-quel podcast, The Magnus Protocol, began in 2024. A prequel novel, From the Library of Jurgen Leitner, was released on the 27th of October 2026.

== Premise ==
The podcast is structured as a horror anthology, following the efforts of Jonathan Sims, Head Archivist of the Magnus Institute, to record on tape a number of statements of paranormal events that have proven impossible to record through conventional, digital means. Each statement begins with the statement-taker—typically Jonathan "Jon" Sims, the head archivist—providing a brief description of the statement and the name of the statement-maker. The compilative statements are more interwoven than previously thought as each new tape recording reveals more about the Magnus Institute and the not so far off lurking fears.

== Cast and characters ==
=== Main cast ===
- Jonathan Sims as Jonathan "Jon" Sims, the Head Archivist of the Magnus Institute. At the beginning of the series, he is often rude, short-tempered, and skeptical of the supernatural subject material of the statements themselves. As the seasons progress, Jon accepts the stories relayed by statement-makers as real and becomes kinder and more sympathetic. As of "Dwelling", he is in a romantic relationship with Martin Blackwood. He is asexual.
- Alexander J. Newall as Martin Blackwood, an archival assistant at the Magnus Institute, who obtained his job by lying about holding a degree in parapsychology, and briefly was the narrator of the podcast while Jonathan was in a coma at the beginning of season 4. He is soft-spoken and generally gravitates away from social gatherings. As of "Dwelling", he is in a romantic relationship with Jonathan Sims, although he had feelings towards the other man since at least the finale of season 3.
  - Newall also voices recurring character Jared Hopworth (aka "The Boneturner") a formerly-human avatar that acquired the ability to manipulate and extract bones, and turned himself into a deformed creature the more he used this ability.
- Lottie Broomhall as Sasha James, an archival assistant at the Magnus Institute, mainly locating records that could set the standard of proof for statements. In "Infestation", she is replaced by an entity known as 'Not-Sasha' (voiced by Evelyn Hewitt), which wears her identity with a different body.
- Mike LeBeau as Timothy "Tim" Stoker, an archival assistant at the Magnus Institute, who assumed the role after Jon was promoted to head archivist, having worked with him previously in the research department. He has been in relationships with men and women, as revealed in "Across the Street" when he courts two file clerks. Tim begins the series as kind and cocksure, but comes to resent his position within the institute, which he is unable to leave, and becomes increasingly more cynical and angry in his interactions with his co-workers, mainly Jon, eventually leading to his death.
- Ben Meredith as Elias Bouchard, the Head of the Magnus Institute and the main antagonist. He is initially dismissive of the concerns surrounding active paranormal activity within the institute, but is quick to reveal some degree of knowledge, and as having intentionally withheld information when confronted.
- Evelyn Hewitt as Not-Sasha, a paranormal entity that wears Sasha James' identity. It lives in the tunnels under the Institute when not performing the administrative tasks previously assigned to the real Sasha James, and has a significant role in drawing Jon's attention to the paranormal happenings within and below the institute.
- Sue Sims as Gertrude Robinson, the previous Head Archivist of the Magnus Institute. She was replaced by Jonathan Sims after she went missing in March 2015. She appears in some episodes in past recordings of statements, as Jon and the other assistants work to understand her previous role at the institute. Her demeanor is brusque, and she is very serious about her work. The true nature of her work and motives is slowly revealed throughout the series, especially in seasons 3 and 4.
- Frank Voss as Basira Hussain, a police officer sectioned to work on 'weird' cases. After responding to a case tied to a supernatural event, she signs a 'Section 31' form and becomes more and more involved in cases that eventually tie back to The Magnus Institute. She becomes involved with the Institute in an investigation surrounding a death in the Institute, in the aptly named episode "Section 31".
- Fay Roberts as Alice "Daisy" Tonner, a detective also sectioned to work on 'weird' cases through Section 31. She is known to use force, as well as her own judgements, to resolve cases.
- Lydia Nicholas as Melanie King, the former host of the YouTube series Ghost Hunt UK. After some strange supernatural incidents, she comes to be employed by the Magnus Institute. As of "Rotten Core" and perhaps before, she is in a romantic relationship with Georgie Barker and has moved in with her.
- Sasha Sienna as Georgie Barker, the fearless host of the What The Ghost? podcast. She lives with her cat, The Admiral, and dated Jonathan Sims back when they both attended university. As of "Rotten Core" and perhaps before, she is in a romantic relationship with Melanie King.
- Alasdair Stuart as Peter Lukas, Captain of The Tundra and member of the Lukas Family. He acts as the antagonist, and temporary Institute Head, in Season 4. He is an avatar for one of the Supernatural Entities called the Lonely.

=== Recurring cast ===
- Jon Gracey as Gerard "Gerry" Keay, who worked alongside Gertrude Robinson after she freed him from his mother, Mary. He is described as having "poorly dyed" black hair and tattoos of eyes on all of his joints and over his heart and throat. Upon his death in 2014, Gertrude Robinson bound him to the Catalogue of the Trapped Dead, where he remained in ghost form until Jonathan Sims burned his page.
- Paul Sims as Jurgen Leitner, a collector of books affected by the same paranormal forces the Institute researches. He went into hiding in 1994 after his library was burned down, and resided in the tunnels underneath of the Institute until his death in "The Librarian".
- Sue Sims as Gertrude Robinson, previous head archivist of the Magnus Institute. By the time Jonathan Sims becomes the Archivist, he was told by Elias Bouchard that Gertrude "died in the line of duty". But later, it is found out that she was shot. Jonathan finds out that she was shot during Mag40 [Human Remains], but the actual death is heard in Mag158 [Panopticon]
- Luke Booys as Michael, also known as The Distortion, a manifestation of one of the Supernatural Entities called the Spiral. Its appearance is flexible, but its base appearance is that of Gertrude Robinson's former assistant, Michael Shelley, a tall man with straw blonde hair and a round face. The Distortion was bound to Michael as part of a ritual disrupted by Gertrude, taking on the appearance of her former assistant, while distorting his features. It both resides in and is a realm accessible only by a door of its own conjuring. It preys on people by luring them into its door and trapping them within an inescapable labyrinth. It was killed by and subsequently became Helen in "Another Twist".
- Hannah Brankin as Jane Prentiss, a previously ordinary woman working as a New Age shop assistant who turned into a living hive for wasp larvae after finding a wasps nest in her attic. Prentiss infected others by having the worms bury into their flesh, either killing them or turning them into hives. She was killed in the archives and cremated soon after.
  - Brankin also voices Rosie Zampano, assistant to Elias Bouchard at the Magnus Institute.
- Imogen Harris as Helen Richardson, a manifestation of the Spiral who replaced Michael, who occasionally assists and disrupts the Archive's activities.
- Guy Kelly as Michael Crew, an avatar of a paranormal force who meets Jonathan Sims in "The Coming Storm". He has a large, branching scar in the shape of a Lichtenberg figure as the result of being struck by lightning as a child.
- Jessica Law as Nikola Orsinov, a plastic mannequin who was originally Joseph Grimaldi. Orsinov serves one of the Supernatural Entities called the Stranger, which she attempts and fails to summon in "Stranger and Stranger".
- Hannah Walker as Jude Perry, a member of The Cult of the Lightless Flame, a group dedicated to destruction and suffering, who encounters Jonathan Sims in "Twice as Bright".
- Russell Smith as Oliver Banks, an avatar of one of the Supernatural Entities called the End, and able to see people's life force in the form of black tendrils.

== Plot ==
The podcast is initially presented as a horror anthology, following the efforts of Jonathan Sims, Head Archivist of the Magnus Institute, to record on tape a number of statements of paranormal events that have proven impossible to record through conventional, digital means. Over the course of five seasons, a more complex metaplot develops, revealing the nature of the Magnus Institute, its head, Elias Bouchard, and the nature of the paranormal events recorded in the statements.

=== Season 1 ===
Season 1 of The Magnus Archives ran from 24 March 2016 to 13 October 2016. It covers episodes 'MAG 1 - Angler Fish' through 'MAG 40 - Human Remains.'

Jonathan Sims is installed as the new Head Archivist of the Magnus Institute's Archives, his predecessor Gertrude Robinson having gone missing and is presumed dead. As he attempts to digitize statements about supernatural incidents, he finds that some statements can only be recorded on cassette tapes, as opposed to the preferred digital recordings. Sims maintains a skeptical view of the statements' potential authenticity. Eventually, the archival staff are directly threatened by Jane Prentiss, a woman who became host to a sentient hive of worms. Prentiss stalks the Institute for several weeks until Sims accidentally damages a wall while attempting to kill a spider, revealing millions of worms hiding behind it. In the ensuing worm attack, Sims and archival assistant Tim Stoker are partially infested while another assistant, Sasha James, is killed by another creature called the Not-Them, which assumes her identity. The attack is ended when Institute Head Elias Bouchard activates the building's carbon dioxide fire suppression system which kills Prentiss and all the worms. In the aftermath, the third archival assistant, Martin Blackwood, reveals that he has found the remains of Robinson in secret tunnels beneath the Magnus Institute.

=== Season 2 ===
Season 2 of The Magnus Archives ran from 1 December 2016, to 31 August 2017. It covers episodes 'MAG 41 - Too Deep' through MAG 80 - The Librarian.'

Following the revelation that Robinson was shot to death, Sims becomes paranoid that one of his coworkers is responsible and begins spying on them for evidence, and his failure to remain discreet prompts them to stage an intervention and give him solid alibis. In between digitizing more statements and exploring the tunnels for clues, Sims encounters a being called the Distortion which has named itself Michael. It maims him and hints that "Sasha" cannot be trusted. This notion is reinforced when Sims takes a live statement from Melanie King, a ghost hunter who had previously interacted with the real Sasha and is able to recognize that the Not-Them is not her. Sims researches the Not-Them and learns that it is bound to a mysterious table in the Institute's artefact storage. He destroys the table in the belief that doing so will kill the Not-Them, but instead it is set free and attempts to kill Sims before being entombed within the tunnels by Jurgen Leitner, a man who had kept hundreds of supernatural books in a library until its destruction by monsters in 1994. Leitner explains to Sims that monsters and supernatural occurrences are the manifestations of beings known as the entities or Dread Powers, each representing a different category of fear, and that the Magnus Institute serves one of these beings, the Eye. Leitner reveals that Bouchard had killed Robinson to prevent her from destroying the Institute. While Sims steps outside to calm down with a cigarette, Bouchard kills Leitner with a metal pipe to stop him from revealing any more. Finding Leitner's body, Sims believes he will be held responsible and goes on the run.

=== Season 3 ===
Season 3 of The Magnus Archives ran from 23 November 2017, to 27 September 2018. It covers episodes 'MAG 81 - A Guest for Mr. Spider' through 'MAG 120 - Eye Contact.'

While being harbored by his ex-girlfriend Georgie Barker, Sims records the story of his first encounter with the paranormal, which he now recognizes as a manifestation of an entity called the Web. Bouchard anonymously mails statements to Sims which hint towards the Unknowing, a ritual that will allow an entity called the Stranger to fully manifest. Following leads from the statements, Sims meets with Jude Perry and Michael Crew, two individuals who serve entities called the Desolation and the Vast, respectively, who both maim him in turn after he unintentionally compels them to give their own statements. Sims is apprehended by Daisy Tonner, a former police officer and servant of the Hunt who has been blackmailed by Bouchard. Tonner's partner, Basira Hussain, convinces her to use Sims' budding abilities to compel Bouchard to confess his crimes, but Bouchard proves immune to Sims' abilities and instead commissions him to stop the Unknowing. Soon thereafter, Sims is abducted by Nikola Orsinov, a living mannequin who leads the Stranger's forces and intends to use Sims' skin in the Unknowing. The Distortion returns to intervene by killing Sims after giving him a statement about how Robinson stopped its own ritual to summon the Spiral, however Sims is spared after the Distortion suddenly rejects its "Michael" persona and takes the form of Helen Richardson, one of its previous victims, who helps Sims escape instead. Sims retraces Robinson's steps, traveling around the world and discovering that he is developing the ability to spontaneously gain knowledge and that he now becomes weaker if he does not read statements regularly. Eventually, Sims encounters Gerard Keay, a man who died of a brain tumor while assisting Robinson and is now undead. Keay explains that the entities, rather than feeding on fear, are literally fear, and must cause supernatural phenomena to sustain themselves. Keay directs Sims to a supply of C-4 that Gertrude had intended to use to stop the Unknowing. Sims arranges for himself, Stoker, Hussain and Tonner to blow up the Unknowing while Blackwood and King, who had been hired on as Sasha's replacement, steal compromising material from Bouchard's office to get him arrested. Stoker is killed in the explosion and Tonner is trapped in a supernatural coffin while Sims is sent into a coma. Shortly before his arrest, Bouchard brings in Peter Lukas, a servant of the Lonely, to act as interim head of the Magnus Institute.

=== Season 4 ===
Season 4 of The Magnus Archives ran from 10 January 2019, to 31 October 2019. It covers episodes 'MAG 121 - Far Away' through 'MAG 160 - The Eye Opens.'

Six months after the previous events, Sims is awoken from his coma by Oliver Banks, a benevolent servant of the End. Returning to the Magnus Institute, Sims learns from Hussain that Lukas has taken Blackwood on as his personal assistant and King has become increasingly violent. Sims deduces that King is being influenced by the Slaughter as a result of her previous encounters with its manifestations and extracts a 'ghost bullet' from her leg, and she wounds him after waking up mid-surgery. Breekon, a servant of the Stranger who survived the Unknowing brings a coffin to the Archives, explaining that it trapped Tonner within the coffin before the explosion. Sims resolves to save Tonner, but since the coffin is aligned with the Buried he plans to leave a part of himself outside of it to find his way back to, and has the Boneturner, a servant of the Flesh, extract one of his ribs. Following his successful retrieval of Tonner from the coffin, Sims researches the other entities' rituals along with Hussain, who has been secretly meeting with Bouchard to take advantage of his near-omniscience. Bouchard convinces them to travel to Ny-Ålesund to stop the ritual of the Dark, only to find a single servant who explains that the ritual failed three years earlier despite it having seemingly been unopposed. Sims destroys the former ritual's catalyst, an artificial dark-energy star, before they return to the Institute. Meanwhile, Lukas and Blackwood research the emergence of a new entity, the Extinction, and plan to gain all knowledge about it by using the Panopticon of Millbank Prison, which has been preserved within the tunnels and was the catalyst of the Eye's ritual centuries prior. Lukas releases the Not-Them to cause a distraction. In the Panopticon, Lukas and Blackwood are met by Bouchard guarding the remains of the Institute's founder, Jonah Magnus. Bouchard reveals that he is the fourth incarnation of Magnus, who has been body swapping as a form of life extension, but offers to allow Blackwood to kill him in order to use the Panopticon's power. Blackwood refuses, explaining that he pretended to follow Lukas' lead to keep his attention away from Sims, who he has fallen in love with. Furious, Lukas banishes Blackwood into the realm of the Lonely but is followed by Sims, who extracts a statement from Lukas before killing him. Sims rescues Blackwood and they retreat to a safe house in Scotland. Because Sims is now sustained by reading statements and cannot stop reading once he starts, he is tricked into reading a statement written by Magnus. Magnus reveals that a ritual can only succeed if it summons all of the entities simultaneously, and that to enact this ritual, he has orchestrated the events of the past three years to get Sims to directly confront and be marked by manifestations of all fourteen entities, allowing him to be the catalyst of a new ritual to summon them all into the world, with the Eye as the supreme entity. Magnus' statement ends with the ritual's incantation which Sims cannot help but to read aloud, transforming the world into a hellscape.

=== Season 5 ===
Season 5 of The Magnus Archives ran from 1 April 2020, to 25 March 2021. It covers episodes 'MAG 161 - Dwelling' through 'MAG 200 - Last Words.' The season was split into three acts due to production delays caused by the COVID-19 pandemic.

Although things are bleak, Sims and Blackwood decide to return to the Institute in London to try to find a way to return the world to how it was before. As they travel, they find that the entities have divided the world into 'domains', most of which are overseen by a servant of the entities. As the Eye's Archivist, Sims is compelled to record his own statements about every domain they visit, and he finds he has the power to replace, punish, and even destroy the entities' servants, though it does little to make things better. He destroys the Not-Them, Perry and the Boneturner, but chooses to spare Banks as well as Simon Fairchild and Callum Brodie, servants of the Vast and the Dark respectively. Sims and Blackwood meet Hussain and lead her to Tonner, who has fully given in to the Hunt and become a monster. Hussain reluctantly kills Tonner, staying behind to mourn. Sims and Blackwood find a house left untouched by the entities, which is inhabited by Mikaele Salesa, a black market dealer who specializes in cursed items, and Annabelle Cane, a servant of the Web. Salesa reveals that he possesses a magical camera that shields the property from the entities. Sims and Blackwood push on towards London, and encounter a former statement giver trapped in a domain shared by the Buried and the Corruption, who Sims chooses to save by making him the domain's ruler. During the final leg of their journey, Sims destroys the Distortion to prevent it from interfering in their goal. In London, they find Barker and King leading a band of survivors in the tunnels, which are mostly safe from the entities. They enter the Panopticon and learn that Magnus has become the Eye's 'pupil' with all of the world's fear channeling through his now-unresponsive body, and Sims realizes that the Eye wants him to replace Magnus. Sims and Blackwood argue about what to do and separate, allowing Blackwood to be apprehended by Cane, who has killed Salesa and taken the camera. Cane convinces Blackwood to follow her to Hill Top Road, a house in Oxford that marks the location of the Gap in Reality which may serve as a gateway to the multiverse. Sims follows them to Hill Top road, joined by Hussain who he meets on the way. At Hill Top Road, Cane explains that the entities are doomed to perish since humans have stopped reproducing and the End will eventually kill them all. To avoid this fate for itself, the Web plans to use all the tapes recorded by Jon and his assistants to bind the entities and pull them through the Gap, allowing them access to infinite worlds with infinite victims. This would remove them entirely from this universe, but would require Sims and his allies to kill Magnus and blow up the Panopticon at the same time to briefly detach the entities from the world. Sims, Blackwood, Hussain, Barker and King discuss their options and decide to carry out this plan since in other worlds the entities would be returned to their initial state of only being able to manifest as monsters and supernatural phenomena. However, Sims betrays their decision and kills Magnus, taking his place as the Eye's pupil. Blackwood, having anticipated this, sends Hussain, Barker and King to blow up the Panopticon early but fails to stop Sims from killing Magnus. Regretful, Sims convinces Blackwood to stab him so the plan to release the entities can still work. Blackwood agrees but refuses to save himself, instead wishing to die with the man he loves. Following the entities' removal from the world, Hussain, Barker and King can find no trace of Sims or Blackwood in the rubble. Finding one last tape recorder running, Hussain tells whoever is listening "I'm sorry, and good luck."

== Sequel ==
On 24 October 2022, it was announced that a sequel was in the works and would be funded through Kickstarter. On 30 October 2022, the title was revealed to be The Magnus Protocol. On 14 December 2023, the release date was revealed to be 18 January 2024.

The podcast revolves around Office of Incident, Assessment, and Response (O.I.A.R.) employees Alice Dyer, Samama "Sam" Khalid, and their co-workers. It is based in a separate timeline from The Magnus Archives, one where the Institute burned to the ground in 1999, and Sam and Alice are haunted by its legacy. The O.I.A.R. 'processes paranormal activity reports' (much like the 'statements' from the original podcast) with their algorithm FR3-d1.

Recurring cast

- Billie Hindle as Alice Dyer
- Shahan Hamza as Samama "Sam" Khalid
- Anusia Battersby as Gwendolyn "Gwen" Bouchard
- Lowri Ann Davies as Celia Ripley
- Sarah Lambie as Lena Kelley
- Ryan Hopevere-Anderson as Colin Becher
- Kazeem Tosin Amore as Teddy Vaughn
- Jonathan Sims as Chester
- Alexander J. Newall as Norris
- Tim Fearon as Augustus

== Novels ==
A prequel novel, From the Library of Jurgen Leitner, was released on October 27, 2026.

A novel set in the world of The Magnus Protocol, "Work your Fingers to the Bone ", will be released on July 13, 2027.

== Reception ==
In 2018, BBC Sounds listed the show as one of the largest British dramatic podcasts, with an extensive fanbase on Tumblr having driven much of its success. By April 2020, The Magnus Archives had reached a download rate of over 2.5 million downloads a month, growing to over 4 million downloads a month by July 2020.

Emily L. Stephens wrote at The A.V. Club that the show has a "vast catalog of horrors and excellent production values." Rachel Weber wrote in GamesRadar that the protagonist's "charmingly grumpy mic presence is a highlight" of the show. Catriona Harvey-Jenner wrote in Cosmopolitan that "you only need to listen to one episode to become hooked." Bryan Bishop wrote in The Verge that the show uses a "minimalist production, [which] lend[s] the stories an eerie, creeping dread." Natalie Zutter wrote at Tor.com that the show is a "welcome distraction from other present terrors." Megan Summers wrote in Screen Rant that the "Magnus Archives is a pioneering horror podcast." Mason Downey wrote in GameSpot that the show is a "perfect blend of spooky, X-Files style monster-of-the-week stories."

The Sydney Morning Herald and Polygon reported that there was a rumor suggesting that the first episode of the final season caused Patreon to crash, but Patreon did not confirm the rumors.

Multiple writers have analyzed the role queerness plays in the podcast. The main character is asexual and several other characters are queer, which is not treated as horrific or monstrous but taken for granted as normal. Hayley McCullough writes that the podcast "can be considered a true example of progressive, inclusive horror where equality, equity, and representation can be defined in terms of the ability for characters to be terrorized by eldritch abominations independent of identity."

=== Awards ===
Award	Date	Category	Recipient	Result	Ref.
Discover Pod Awards	2019	Best Audio Drama or Fiction Podcast	The Magnus Archives	Won	
This Is Horror Awards	2019	Fiction Podcast of The Year	The Magnus Archives	Runner-up	
Audio Verse Awards	2019	Audio Play Production	The Magnus Archives	Won	
Audio Verse Awards	2019	Writing of an Audio Play Production	Jonathan Sims	Won	
Audio Verse Awards	2019	Performance of a Leading Role in an Audio Play Production	Jonathan Sims	Won	
Audio Verse Awards	2019	Vocal Direction of a Production	Alexander J. Newall	Won	
Audio Verse Awards	2019	Performance of a Supporting Role in an Audio Play Production	Alexander J. Newall	Won	
Audio Verse Awards	2020	Vocal Direction of a Production	Alexander J. Newall	Won	
Audio Verse Awards	2020	Performance of a Supporting Role in an Audio Play Production	Alexander J. Newall	Won	
Audio Verse Awards	2020	Environment Sound Design in a Production	Elizabeth Moffatt	Won	
Audio Verse Awards	2020	Action Sound Design in a Production	Elizabeth Moffatt	Won	
Audio Verse Awards	2020	Writing of an Audio Play Production	Jonathan Sims	Won	
Audio Verse Awards	2020	Performance of a Leading Role in an Audio Play Production	Jonathan Sims	Won	
Audio Verse Awards	2020	Performance of a Supporting Role in an Audio Play Production	Alasdair Stuart	Won	
Audio Verse Awards	2020	Cover Art for a Production	Anika Khan	Won	
Audio Verse Awards	2020	Audio Play Production	The Magnus Archives	Won	
Audio Verse Awards	2021	Existing Audio Play Production	The Magnus Archives	Won	
Audio Verse Awards	2021	Music Direction for an Existing Production	Brock Winstead	Won	
Audio Verse Awards	2021	Action Sound Design in an Existing Production	Elizabeth Moffatt and Alexander J Newall	Won	
Audio Verse Awards	2021	Environment Sound Design in an Existing Production	Elizabeth Moffatt and Alexander J Newall	Won	
Audio Verse Awards	2021	Writing for an Existing Production	Jonathan Sims	Won	
Audio Verse Awards	2021	Vocal Direction of an Existing Production	Alexander J Newall	Won	
Audio Verse Awards	2021	Performance of a Supporting Role in an Existing Production	Sasha Sienna	Won	
Audio Verse Awards	2021	Performance of a Supporting Role in an Existing Production	Lydia Nicholas	Won	
Audio Verse Awards	2021	Performance of a Leading Role in an Audio Play Production	Jonathan Sims	Won	
Audio Verse Awards	2021	Performance of a Leading Role in an Audio Play Production	Alexander J Newall	Won	
Audio Verse Awards	2021	Cover Art for a Production	Anika Khan	Won	
British Fantasy Awards	2021	Best Audio	The Magnus Archives	Won	
British Podcast Awards	2022	Best Fiction	The Magnus Archives	Lost	
The People's Choice Podcast Awards	2022	Best Fiction	The Magnus Archives	Lost	

== Other media ==
=== The Magnus Archives Roleplaying Game ===
A licensed game made by Monte Cook Games. Launched on Backerkit on 29 August 2023. This game is the first crowdfunded RPG project to exceed 1 million US dollars on a platform other than Kickstarter. The game became available on the Monte Cook Games web-store on October 30 of 2024.

=== Fan translations ===
In 2021, Ingressive published a German fan translation of The Magnus Archives with the title Das Magnus Archiv. Florian Schießler is the translator of the show and voice actor of Jonathan "Jon" Sims.

As of July 2025, three seasons of Das Magnus Archiv have been released.

== See also ==
- Horror podcast
