= Noriko Tadano =

Japanese tsugaru shamisen performer, composer and vocalist

Noriko Tadano 只野 徳子
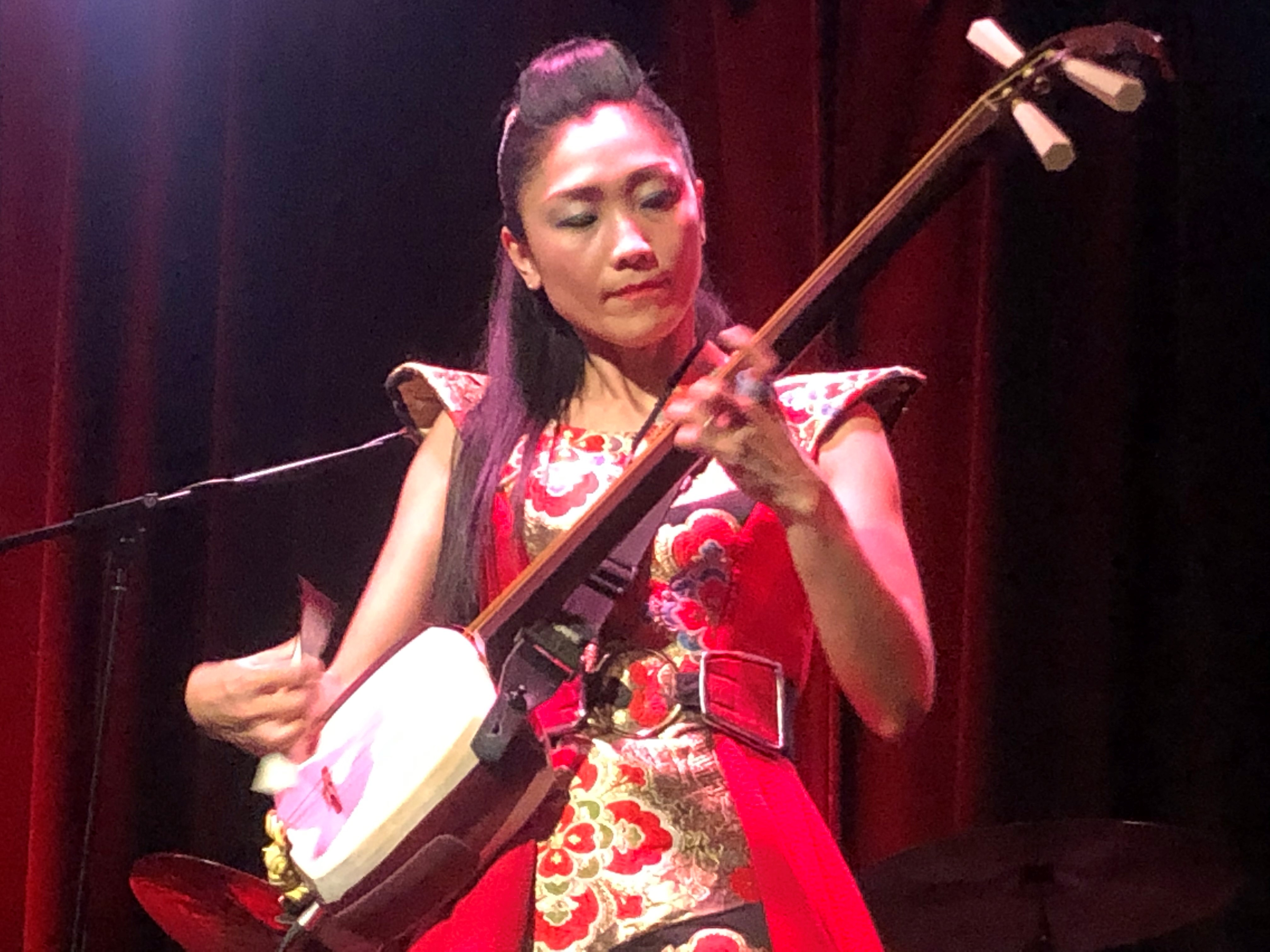
- Tadano performing at Nexus Arts 2021

Background information
- Born: 30 March 1978 (age 48); Chiba, Japan
- Genres: Folk, traditional, blues, jazz, experimental
- Instruments: Tsugaru shamisen, taiko, voice
- Years active: 2004 – present
- Member of: George & Noriko
- Website: https://www.norikotadano.com/

Noriko Tadano (只野 徳子) (born March 30, 1978) is a Japanese tsugaru shamisen performer, composer and vocalist. Tadano is both a solo artist and collaborator, and is known for crossover performances combining traditional and modern music.

Tadano has performed with renowned contemporary musicians as well as traditional Japanese artists. She also composes music for film and theatre productions.

== Early life ==
Noriko Tadano was born in Chiba, Japan and moved to Australia in 2004. Her father is from Fukushima and her mother from Akita. Tadano has an older sister.

Tadano began playing the shamisen when she was six years old. Her father grew up in the rural village of Iitate, Fukushima, and listened to traditional Japanese folk songs whilst working in the fields. After moving to Chiba prefecture, he joined a folk song club and started playing the shamisen, subsequently inspiring Tadano to learn the instrument.

== Career ==
=== 2004–2009: Australia and Staircase to the Moon ===
Tadano moved to Melbourne, Australia in 2004, spending time as a Japanese assistant language teacher, as well as busking on the street and performing on the shamisen at open mic nights. Tadano saw her work as an opportunity to share Japanese culture with others, and to give people the opportunity to see a traditional Japanese instrument.

Through performing on the streets and playing at local events, Tadano subsequently met and collaborated with local musicians, such as taiko drummer Toshi Sakamoto (founder of the Wadaiko Rindo taiko group) and blues musician George Kamikawa.

Tadano also taught shamisen, and in 2005 pioneered Australia's first shamisen group, called 'Shamys', which performed at a variety of events and festivals in Victoria, Australia.

In 2008, Noriko independently released her solo album Staircase to the Moon. The name was inspired by the natural phenomenon caused by the rising of a full moon reflecting off the exposed mudflats at extremely low tide, to create a beautiful optical illusion of a stairway reaching to the moon. Noriko encountered this during a trip to Broome, Western Australia when playing a show at the Shinju Matsuri.

Determined to challenge herself musically and develop beyond live performance, Noriko composed music for the 2008 documentary Angel of the Wind, which premiered at the Melbourne International Film Festival. The film was directed by Tahir Cambis, who also directed Exile in Sarajevo, which won an International Emmy award in 1998. A number of musicians including Nick Cave, Pizzicato Five, Robin Cuming, and Jadranka Stojaković were also involved in composing music for the film.

Tadano was awarded the Head Judge's Special Award (審査員長特別賞) at the Hirosaki Tsugaru Shamisen World Cup in 2009, and in the same year performed solo at the Japan Australia Music Goodwill Mission Xmas Concert at the Sydney Opera House.

She collaborated with Gerry Hale in 2009 performing at La Mama Theatre as part of The Melbourne Jazz Fringe Festival as well as a number of other shows around Melbourne.

=== 2010–2018: Festivals, 'George and Noriko' and TV ===
Noriko performed at WOMADelaide 2010, playing a solo show and two duo shows with George Kamikawa, as well as being invited on the main stage to be part of the All Star Gala on the final day. The Gala was conducted by Ross Daly, with Tadano sharing the stage with musicians such as Mariem Hassan, Besh o droM, Lepistö & Lehti and Xavier Rudd.

Tadano appeared on the popular Australian music quiz show 'Spicks and Specks' in 2010, closing the show with a performance with Dave Faulkner, lead singer of the band Hoodoo Gurus.

Tadano performed with Old Man River at the East Brunswick Club in Melbourne on July 15, 2011 and performed with George Kamikawa at the 5th World Summit on Art and Culture held in Melbourne in the same year.

Tadano also performed solo at the Australasian World Music Expo (AWME) 2011, held in Melbourne.

In 2012, Noriko teamed up with George Kamikawa to perform on season 6 of the Australia's Got Talent TV show. Their performances were praised by the judges, Dannii Minogue and Kyle Sandilands, with Brian McFadden stating that Noriko was like a "female Japanese Slash", comparing Tadano's shamisen playing to the legendary Guns N' Roses guitarist Slash. George & Noriko secured the most public votes to progress to the finals.

George & Noriko performed all over Australia and received a standing ovation for an impromptu collaboration with the legendary Australian musician Chris Wilson at the 2012 Blue Mountain Music Festival in Katoomba.

In 2014, Tadano composed the music live on stage for the theater production Everyman and the Pole Dancers, directed by Lech Mackiewicz in collaboration with the theatre company Shinjuku Ryozanpaku and Auto Da Fe. The production toured Australia and Japan and a book was also published by Currency Press.

In 2010 and again in 2016, Tadano supported the heavy metal band Twelve Foot Ninja at iconic Melbourne live music venues such as the Corner Hotel and Ding Dong Lounge, and had a cameo in the 2015 'One Hand Killing' music video.

To celebrate International Women's Day 2016, Tadano composed and performed music for the Book of Daughters concert series presented by Jolt Arts. The series included a number of Australian artists as well as Yoshimio (a.k.a. Yoshimi P-We of Boredoms, OOIOO and Free Kitten) on drum kit, electronics and vocals.

In mid-2016, Noriko toured Japan with George Kamikawa, playing shows in Tokyo, Chiba and Mie prefecture.

Being referred to as "one of Australia's most highly-demanded artists", Tadano began to develop a greater presence in Japan, and appeared on the popular Japanese TV Tokyo program, Sekai Naze Soko ni? Nihonjin in 2018. The program provided an insight into Tadano's personal life in Australia as well as her musical career.

Having previously performed with legendary jazz musician Bob Sedergreen, Tadano was invited to join his son Steve Sedergreen and numerous other musicians to rework The Far East Suite for the 2018 Stonnington Jazz Festival in Melbourne.

Tadano has continued to perform at many Australian festivals in both solo and collaborative performances, at festivals including Woodford Folk Festival, Port Fairy Folk Festival, Caloundra music festival, Airlie Beach Festival of Music and the National Folk Festival, as well as international festivals such as CubaDupa (New Zealand), Powell Street Festival (Canada) and Lang Schwenninger Kulturnacht (Germany).

=== 2019–present ===
In February 2019, Tadano supported Nai Palm, lead singer of three time Grammy-nominated Hiatus Kaiyote at The Curtin, Melbourne.

Tadano was commissioned to develop an original audio guide score to the highly successful Japan Supernatural exhibition held at the Art Gallery of NSW in 2020. Featuring works by Japanese artists past and present, from historical master Hokusai to superstar Takashi Murakami. Utilizing voice, shamisen and the kokyū, with Toshi Sakamoto on taiko drums, the music was designed to respond to the themes of the exhibition and was referred to as a "cinematic experience for the ears", with over 40,000 visitors attending. An app was created available through the Apple app store and the project was a finalist in the 2020 GLAMi awards.

In 2020, Tadano was interviewed by the Japanese TV Asahi program Beat Takeshi's TV Tackle, hosted by Takeshi Kitano. Tadano discussed the impact that COVID-19 has had on Australia and the live music industry.

In December 2021, Tadano performed at the Japanaroo concert in Sydney Town Hall, collaborating with digeridoo player William Barton and sharing the stage with performers including Kamahl.

In 2021, Tadano wrote, directed and produced a solo theatre show titled Yasha's Lullaby as her first foray into acting.

In 2022, Tadano worked with Nexus Arts and the Adelaide Symphony Orchestra on 'Flood of Fire', an artist-led community-building project drawing on the cultural heritage of a wide spectrum of communities living in South Australia. She also appeared with George Kamikawa in an advertisement celebrating the Australian Broadcasting Corporation's 90th birthday. In the same year Tadano composed music for The White Vault, a horror fiction podcast created by K.A. Statz and Travis Vengroff.

In June 2023, Tadano collaborated with the Australian String Quartet (ASQ) for multiple live shows. In partnership with Nexus Arts, the project was described as “a bridging between two worlds—that of the traditional Japanese shamisen and that of the string quartet”.

The quartet performed pieces including works by Caroline Shaw with Tadano performing original compositions “producing some striking sounds with her virtuosic approach to the shamisen. Her playing is exuberant and uninhibited”. The collaborative pieces performed with the ASQ “culminated with ‘Vertigo’, a frenetic piece with the energy of a rock/pop song”.

In July 2023, Tadano toured Europe performing in Germany with Berlin based Iki Iki Taiko as well as debut shows at the Japan Paris Expo 2023. Japan Expo is a convention on Japanese popular culture and is the largest of its kind in the world, taking place in Paris, France.

In August 2024, Tadano was presented a Consul-General's commendation for her many years of significant contribution to mutual understanding and friendship between Japan and Australia through her shamisen and other performances.

Tadano completed further European tours in 2024 and 2025, performing in Croatia, Switzerland, France and England. The 2024 tour included performances and workshops at WOMAD UK

Tadano again worked with the Australian String Quartet releasing a mini-EP in May 2025. Vertigo and Staircase to the Moon, composed by Tadano and arranged for string quartet and shamisen by Emily Tulloch.

In September 2025, Tadano performed in Hengchun, Taiwan, headlining the Hear Here World Music Festival with Taiwanese musicians Sauljaljui and Nini.

In October 2025, the Australian Folk Music Awards (AFMAs) were held at the Brunswick Ballroom, Melbourne. Tadano was awarded the winner of the Australian Folk Artist of the Year in the solo category.

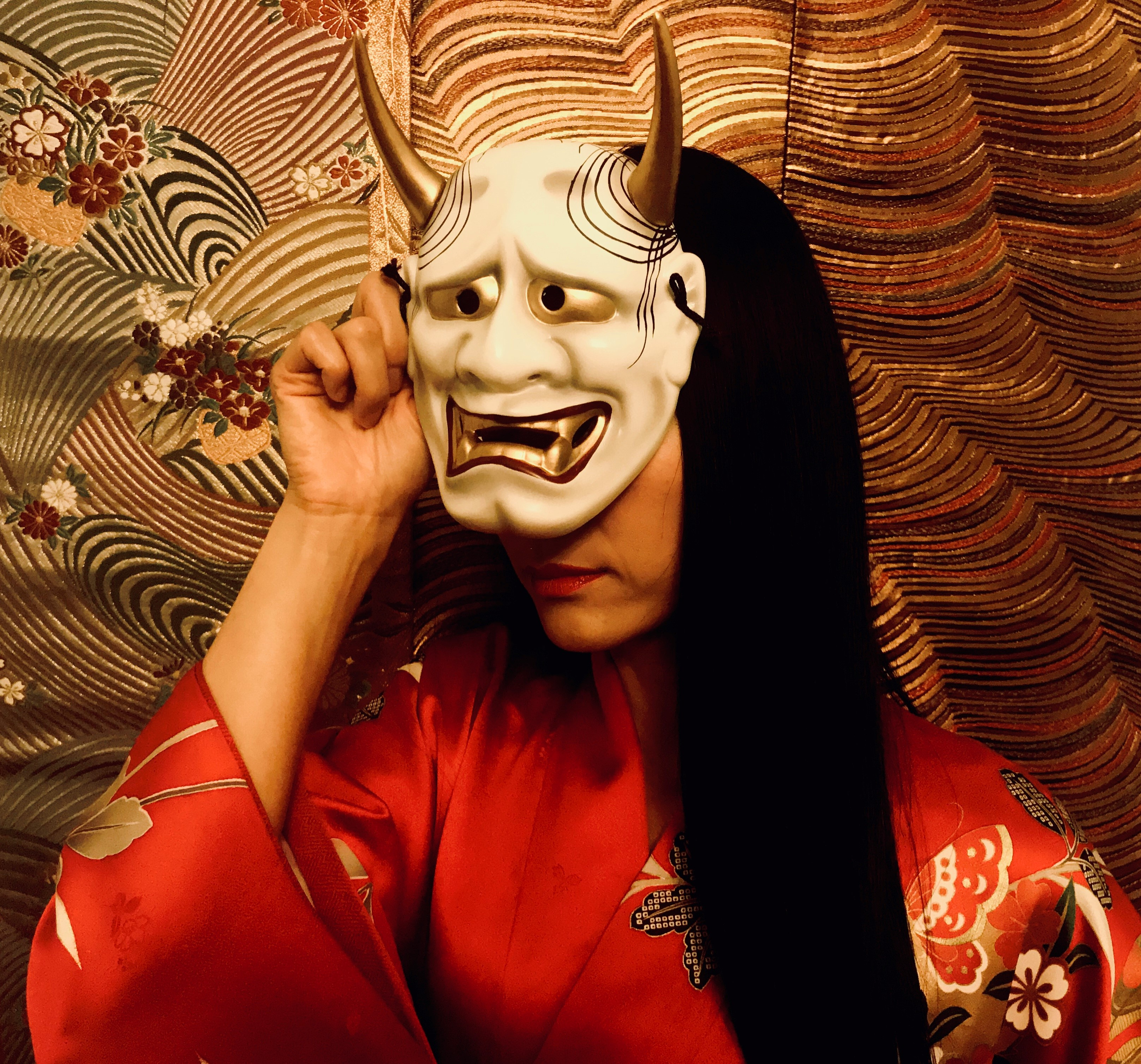
Tadano - Yasha's Lullaby

== Charity events ==
On the 11 March 2011, the Tōhoku earthquake and tsunami devastated Japan. Tadano's relatives were heavily impacted by the resulting Fukushima Daiichi nuclear disaster and were forced to evacuate their homes. Her relatives survived, but none have been able to return to their homes, farms and businesses, deemed too close to the disaster for a safe return to be possible.

With such a close personal connection, Tadano has supported a large number of fundraiser and charity events to show support for Japan and its rebuilding efforts, performing at events with musicians such as Mach Pelican, The Wellingtons, Dya Singh and Yumi Umiumare.

In 2015, Tadano performed at the 70th anniversary of the Hiroshima bombing, supporting The International Campaign to Abolish Nuclear Weapons (ICAN). ICAN strives to achieve a global ban on nuclear weapons.

In 2021, Tadano joined a number of artists in a Fundraising Concert for Afghanistan. Over $10,000 was raised and donated to Mahboba's Promise, an Australian non-profit organisation dedicated to helping disadvantaged women and children in Afghanistan.

== Awards and nominations ==
- Australian Busking Championship at Mortlake, Victoria, 2008, with George Kamikawa
- Head Judge's Special Award at the Hirosaki Tsugaru Shamisen World Cup in 2009, held in Hirosaki, Japan
- Selected as a finalist for the 2021 South Australian Governor's Multicultural award for her work in promoting multiculturalism in the South Australian community through the arts or cultural activities
- Winner of the Australian Folk Artist of the Year (Solo) 2025

== Discography ==
=== Solo albums ===
- Staircase to the Moon (2008)

=== Compilations ===
- Global Carnival - various artists (2008)

=== George and Noriko ===
- East West (2010)
- Howlin' Sun (2016)

=== Noriko Tadano & Australian String Quartet - mini-EP ===
- Staircase to the Moon (2025)
- Vertigo (2025)

== Filmography ==
=== Television and film ===
| Year | Title | Role | Notes |
|---|---|---|---|
| 2007 | ABC Sunday Arts (ABC) | Herself | Performance with Wadaiko Rindo taiko group. |
| 2008 | Angel of the Wind | Composer | Documentary directed by Tahir Cambis. |
| 2010 | Spicks and Specks – Season 6, Episode 1 (ABC) | Herself | Performed during 'Look What They've Done to My Song, Ma' segment and closed the show with a performance of Chuck Berry's 'Johnny B. Goode' with Dave Faulkner. |
| 2011 | Art Nation (ABC) | Musician | 'George and Noriko' performance |
| 2012 | Australia's Got Talent – Season 6 (Channel 7) | Herself | Musicians 'George & Noriko'. Progressed through to the finals on the show. |
| 2014 | NAT Chat 2014 Series 1 Episode 1 - Migration Stories (Channel 31) | Herself | Richard Micallef interviews Noriko Tadano |
| 2018 | Sekai Naze Soko ni? Nihonjin (TV Tokyo) | Herself | Documentary style program that explores the lives of notable Japanese living overseas. |
| 2020 | TV Tackle (TV Asahi) | Herself | Interviewed about life in Australia and the impact of COVID-19 |
| 2022 | The White Vault: Echoes (Podcast series) | Composer | Composed music for The White Vault Echoes episode. |

== Stage ==
| Year | Title | Role | Notes |
|---|---|---|---|
| 2014 | Everyman and the Pole Dancers | Composer | Theatre production directed by Lech Mackiewicz. |
| 2020/22 | Yasha's Lullaby | Wako/Yasha | Written, directed and produced by Noriko. 1st development performed at the Adelaide Festival Centre and 2nd development at Nexus Arts. |
