= Dark Dice =

- Cover art for the first season
- Genre: Actual play; Horror; fantasy
- Country of origin: United States; Germany
- Language: English

Cast and voices
- Hosted by: Travis Vengroff (season 1–present); K. A. Statz (season 3–present)

Production
- Direction: Travis Vengroff
- Production: Travis Vengroff

Technical specifications
- Audio format: MP3

Publication
- Original release: September 25, 2018
- Provider: Fool & Scholar Productions

Related
- Website: darkdice.com

Dark Dice is a horror-dark fantasy actual play podcast created by the husband and wife duo of Travis Vengroff and K. A. Statz (Note: Credited as K. A. Statz as staff member and gamemaster, and as "Kaitlin Statz" as a player and voice actress.) and produced by Fool & Scholar Productions. It is set in an original medieval fantasy setting created by Vengroff and follows characters trying to overcome an evil shapeshifting being known as the Nameless God. Vengroff acts as gamemaster, joined by Statz as co-gamemaster in season 3.

Dark Dice emphasizes the potential deaths of all player characters, and the potential losses of their sanities, which affect their perceptions of the world; a player whose character dies does not get a new character, and instead leaves the show. The first season and campaign, Domain of the Nameless God, premiered on September 25, 2018, and concluded on January 14, 2021. The second season, a direct continuation called The Long Road and divided into dual campaigns, premiered on February 26, 2021 and concluded on April 16, 2025; during a hiatus for season 2, the third season and fourth campaign, Shores of the Silver Thrum, was started, and is currently ongoing.

The series features immersive sound design and original music, with all non-player character (NPC) dialogue being re-dubbed by voice actors during post-production. The show is fan-funded; it was originally released on a monthly basis before switching to a bi-monthly basis for season 3. The podcast was originally based on the 5th edition rules of Dungeons & Dragons, although references to Dungeons & Dragons were later removed from the podcast for legal reasons, while the crew switched to using their own tabletop role-playing game, Domain of the Nameless God.

== Production ==
=== Casting and recording ===
The show features a number of voice actors having previously worked with Fool & Scholar Productions; season 1 notably featured exclusively players who were involved in The White Vault, namely Hem Cleveland, Eyþór Viðarsson, Peter Joseph Lewis, David Ault, and Kessi Riliniki, who, together with Lani Minella, formed the main cast of the first season of The White Vault, and Statz, who was the creator and writer of The White Vault, while Vengroff, the gamemaster, was its director, producer, sound designer and editor; Minella herself would later voice an NPC, Gunther, in season 2, and players who later joined the series include The White Vault cast members Eric Nelsen, Sophie Yang, Danilo Battistini, and, briefly, Tanja Milojevic.

The second season of the show was originally conceived as a shorter "epilogue" story, titled "The Long March"; instead, it became a fully-fledged season with dual campaigns renamed The Long Walk. Jeff Goldblum was announced as cast member for the second season in June 2021, as the character Balmur. The White Vault cast member Tanja Milojevic was also intended to join as a player in the B campaign, but her character died in battle shortly after being introduced, and therefore remained unnamed and is only briefly featured in the first episode of the campaign. Milojevic returned to voice the NPC Lirril, who, after being rescued by the party, becomes a player character, still portrayed by Milojevic. In the same episode Lirril becomes a player character, Drew Tillman also joins as Elias "Payne" Embertree, extending the original party of two making up the A campaign in its first five episodes, to four.

In a special release on April 14, 2021, Vengroff and Statz announced that, if they reached 2,500 subscribers on Patreon by May 12, they would switch Dark Dice from being a side-project of Fool & Scholar Productions to part of their yearly production schedule, "with seasonal releases every two weeks (or more if we're able)." The second season went into hiatus after episode 5A (the fifth episode of the A campaign), released in March 2023, due to the upcoming wedding of Cleveland and Viðarsson, the two players featured in season 2's A campaign; the following May 26, Vengroff announced that the rest of season 2 was postponed due to Cleveland and Viðarsson deciding to take time off following their wedding; he announced that the show would move forward with its third season, and would return to season 2 "after this new story concludes so our cast can enjoy the first few months of their marriage." Season 3 premiered on June 20, 2023, with a prologue episode featuring two of the eight new players, in which Vengroff confirmed that Dark Dice was now upgraded to a bi-monthly release. Domain of the Nameless God was always intended to be followed by a new campaign with a cast of all-new characters, and as such season 3, Shores of the Silver Thrum, featured new players playing original characters. The tenth episode of Shores of the Silver Thrum, "The Tempest", was released on May 28, 2024, with The Long Road resuming the following June 11; it is unknown whether Shores of the Silver Thrum has concluded, or if it will be continued after the completion of The Long Road.

Episodes 19 to 21 of season 2, all part of the A campaign, are a crossover with The Lucky Die, another actual play podcast; the events of the joint game session are canon to both Dark Dice and The Luck Die, with its events being featured on both podcasts, although some scenes are exclusive to either version while remaining canon to both; as a result of being the gamemaster of The Lucky Die, Hem Cleveland acts as co-gamemaster alongside Vengroff for these episodes, and her Dark Dice character, Rowena, spends most of the three-episode arc unconscious so that Cleveland does not act as both gamemaster and player simultaneously.

=== Music ===
Steven Melin wrote the opening theme of the series, "Domain of the Nameless God"; Melin, Brandon Boone, and Vengroff act as main composers for the series' original music. Other contributors include players Hem Cleveland and Eyþór Viðarsson, who wrote and performed the song "Funeral Song 1" (Note: Also released as "Funeral Rites of Celègon (Minor Key)" in the album release.) in Icelandic for the show, and the song "Elven Wood Cutting Song" improvised on the spot by player Jeff Goldblum while recording season 2 (with fellow cast members Russ D. More, Peter Joseph Lewis, and Holly Billinghurst joining in), with Melin, Vengroff, and Mike Pettry later adding orchestration in post-production.

On August 3, 2022, Japanese video game composer Hitoshi Sakimoto was announced to create new music for Dark Dice, with the recording sessions taking place on August 12 and 22. The two tracks written by Sakimoto are "Echo of Seasons" and "The Sufferers' Cant". David Wise, the British video game composer, has also composed music for the series and is credited for the outro theme in season 3. Austin Wintory, Ryan McQuinn, Dallas Crane, Yuzo Koshiro, and Nobuo Uematsu have also contributed to the series.

== Plot ==
=== Season 1: Domain of the Nameless God ===
The first season of the podcast revolves around a party of six characters attempting to find and rescue the children of Ilmater's Hope, a town whose children inexplicably disappeared. The party consists of Dwarven cousins Rowena Granitepike and Father Westpike, Human ranger and necromancer Soren Arkwright, innkeeper Iaus Innskeep, whose son Barrin is among the missing children, paladin Sister Cavernsfall, and the witch Flygia of Zarketh, feared by the townspeople. The team follows the trail of the missing children into the Dead Pines forest, where they start being hunted by The Silent One, a sinister creature that has the ability to shapeshift into whoever it pleases. The first loss of a party member happens in Chapter 7, when Rowena, under the influence of a cursed dagger, attempts to stab Father Westpike, only for Sister Cavernsfall to sacrifice herself by taking the blow in his place. The second casualty is Flygia, who is separated from the party and finds herself in a hall of mirrors in Chapter 9; although the end of the scene is left ambiguous, and she seemingly reunites with the rest of the party, "Flygia" turns on the party in Chapter 12 and is killed by Iaus in self-defence, with necromancy revealing that she had been killed and taken over by a creature in Chapter 9, with Flygia's player secretly playing as the creature afterwards.

Rowena, Father Westpike, Soren and Iaus reach a bastion at the heart of the domain of the Nameless God, who had abducted the children in order to sacrifice them, allowing it to reach its full strength. Although most of the children have already been sacrificed, the team manages to save the two still alive, including Barrin, as well as a third child of unknown origins also present; however, a huge mistake from Iaus' player results in the ritual being successful. The four barely manage an escape from the Nameless God's domain with the three children, but learn that they must sacrifice someone in order to seal the gateway linking its domain to their world. In an ambiguous scene, Soren seemingly stabs himself to seal the gate, only to be revived by a being which might have been the spirit of Sister Cavernsfall or the Nameless God. The campaign ends on a bittersweet note, as the party of four returns to Ilmater's Hope mostly unsuccessful in their rescue attempt, and with two of their members dead; they also realize that time passed differently within the domain of the Nameless God, and that 10 months have passed in the outside world since their departure; the village suffered a harsh winter, a food shortage, and with the children missing, many of the townspeople took their own lives. However, Iaus got his son back, and the four know that by sealing the gate, they stopped the Nameless God, at least for now.

=== Season 2: The Long Road ===
The second season is a direct continuation of the first, and is divided into two campaigns, "A" and "B"; the series alternates between the two campaigns, mostly focusing on the B campaign originally while focusing on the A campaign for a lengthy period afterwards; both notably question what really happened at the end of the previous season during Soren's "sacrifice", which the characters remember differently from each other.

The A campaign follows Rowena and Father Westpike, staying at Ilmater's Hope with Aud, the child of unknown origins they rescued the previous season; Rowena remembers the end of the previous season as it was presented to viewers, while Father Westpike struggles to remember it, and both are left with severe trauma from their rescue mission. Their new life is troubled by the hostile townspeople, who doubt their story; Aud similarly claims that she saw Rowena kill Soren, and that he did not come back to life. The two go to the town's church to attempt to help the people inside, who turned their backs on their gods, but are attacked by them and kill one in self-defense; as the behavior of the townspeople worsens, the cousins flee Ilmater's Hope with the help of Gunther, the third kid they saved with Barrin and Aud, and head north for Westman's Hold, to reunite with Father Westpike's family, whom he is worried about, and fight against the Kordalum, a family related to them they wish to take revenge against.

They rest at the Riverside Inn, where they free two enslaved creatures, the Deep Elf Lirril and the chimera Riith, who join in their travels together with Payne, a Human hired to bring them to the city of Audin where he decides to remain with the group due to sharing Westpike's faith and his own past having ties to The Nameless Gods. An encounter with city guards turns bloody, and their captain afflicts Rowena with a powerful curse, with the group soon finding themselves unexpectedly teleported away to a dream-like place where they meet another group of adventurers. (Note: Those three characters are from The Luckie Die podcast and join as player characters for three crossover episodes.) A mysterious woman, Githa the Borge, explains that two groups brought there from different places in space and time must team up to overcome a powerful being called The Shrieking Lady. They are successful, but before returning both groups to their points of origin, Githa warns Westpike that the curse afflicting Rowena would ultimately bring manifest a terrible being known as "The Neverborn"; Githa claims that Rowena is beyond saving, but Westpike refuses to end her life, taking his cousin back to their era after the two groups of adventurers bid each other farewell.

The B campaign follows Soren, who remembers being unexpectedly killed by Rowena at the end of the previous season, yet finds himself alive in the Dead Pines as Human siblings Gaelle and Glom of House Vogelberg attack a group of elven slavers, rescuing the Elven hunter Balmur and the Scaleskin storyteller Ildrex Mystan from being sacrificed to the slavers' god; the five team up in an attempt to reach Ilmater's Hope, with a vengeful Soren looking to find his former teammates. In Chapter 3B, Balmur is revealed to be The Nameless God in disguise, leaving the party but starting to stalk the team members; the following episode, he murders Gaelle by strangling her, removes her body, and shapeshifts into her to take her place; Ildrex is the only witness, but his fragile sanity makes him think it was a dream. Unaware of the traitor within their ranks, the team returns to Ilmater's Hope, which Rowena and Father Westpike have already left by this point: Soren learns that the two are now wanted criminals, and have notably been charged with murder for the deaths of Soren, Sister Cavernsfall, and the person they encountered inside the church in campaign A. Soren reunites with a worried Iaus, who claims that Rowena stabbed Soren before the others could react; Soren forgives him for his "death". Iaus, who now takes care of both Barrin, Aud, and Gunther, plans on leaving town with them, feeling that they are no longer welcome in Ilmater's Hope, and is gone by the time the group wakes up from their first night in town. Realizing how dangerous the town has become, with its people having turned to dark gods, the group leaves and keeps following Rowena and Father Westpike's trail, reaching the Riverside Inn and later the town of Audin.

=== Season 3: Liberty Vigilance ===
The third season is an actual play using the Liberty: A.F.T.E.R tabletop role-playing game, consisting of a single season of 13 episodes released in 2018. It features the voice talents of Ashly Burch, Eric Nelsen, Dave Fennoy, Lani Minella, and George Lowe.

=== Season 4: Shores of the Silver Thrum ===
The fourth season is a stand-alone story set in the same world, and following a party of new characters. It takes place on a 190-years old ship called The Willow's Wake, whose crew, hired by the Farhauler Company and including the Orc deckhand Konvo and the Human shipwright Jare Driftwood, is tasked with transporting cargo from Embergrad northward to Winterport, a Vinnelhaven colony within the Northrealm lands. Several guests are also aboard: the trio of Elf clan leader Vind Greyview, half-Orc warlock Agé Ogun, and wide-eyed young Halfling Nimbleremble "Nimble" Troutspinetrout, travelling together in a quest to appease the Gods whom they believe have repudiated their respective villages in the Blackstone Forest, the lively Tiefling Vivianna Bloodchamber and the Human noblewoman Lady Lán Qiu, seeking help for her cursed native lands.

Official art of the first season's characters. From top to bottom and left to right: The Nameless God, Iaus Innskeep, Soren Arkright, Flygia of Zarketh, Sister Cavernsfall, Father Westpike, and Rowena Granitepike.

The Willow's Wake's first stop on its way to Winterport is the town-island of the Sunken Bulwark, populated by believers in a god named The Sunken One, where the guests meet the Halfling bard Yuehai, also to join the ship as a guest from that point onward and who tells the story of the nearby Diviner Shell Cave, which legends say tells one the truth of their innermost desires. The Blackstone trio investigates the cave and soon find themselves in a dangerous situation; while it seems that they might escape safely, Vind, aware that Agé suspects that he killed his brother to become tribe leader, seizes this opportunity to push the other two into the storming waters filling the cave and flee. Agé barely survives but realizes that Nimble died during the struggle, and promises to kill Vind in revenge.

While the crew is still in the Sunken Bulwark, Vivianna interrupts the town's religious proceedings to rescue "Fluffy", a creature intended by the crew to be sacrificed to the island's goddess, causing fury and chaos. The Willow's Wake manages to escape from the Sunken Bulwark the island with most of its crew, but Lán is dealt a fatal blow during the escape. Vind lies and claims that Agé killed Nimble, causing the crew to pacify and jail Agé. During their journey a storm hits and destroys the ship. In the chaos, Vind attempts to kill Agé, who despite getting a spear through the stomach defeats him and leaves him to drown, while Yuehai, who can shapeshift into a crocodile, does so in the hopes of saving herself and Vivianna. As Konvo drowns, the other characters' fates are left unclear as the remnants of the ship sink into the water.

The survivors (Agé, Vind, Vivianna, Jare, and Yuehai) awake on an unknown beach and travel toward the only source of light they can see, a halfling village. They are given food and informed that they are on the remote Isle of Silver Shores with no clear way of returning home. The halflings suggest checking out an old human fortress on the other side of the island, and the team agrees to investigate it.

== Player characters ==
Introduced in season 1

- Lady Rowena Granitepike (played by Hem Cleveland), a female Dwarven bard. She is a distant relative of Father Westpike, and the two refer to each other as "cousins".
- Father Sindri Westpike (Eyþór Viðarsson), a male Dwarven cleric. A priest who worships Celegon, he is Rowena's distant, much-older relative.
- Soren Arkright of the Bright Vale (Peter Joseph Lewis), a male Human ranger. A monster hunter and tracker, he is hired by Sister Cavernsfall to help find the missing children, and is also capable of a necromancy spell temporary bringing a soul back to question it.
- Iaus Innskeep (David Ault), a male Tiefling rogue. The innkeeper of Ilmater's Hope, his son Barrin is among the missing children. He is capable of summoning a dead bird which gives him advice on how to proceed.
- Sister Tsavorite Cavernsfall (K. A. Statz), a female Dwarven paladin. She is a member of the Paladins of Iluvians, a religious group aiming to defend rightful causes and spread their beliefs. She was staying in Ilmater's Hope building a church when the children went missing.
- Flygia of Zarketh (Kessi Riliniki), a female Tiefling druid. Living in isolation near Ilmater's Hope, she is feared by its citizens, who nickname her "the demon-witch of the grey swamp", "the keeper of the wilds", and "the lady of bunnies".

Introduced in season 2

- Balmur (Jeff Goldblum), a male Elven sorcerer with strong cleric attributes in campaign B. Although Balmur originally poses as an uplifting religious Wood Elf, he is later revealed to be The Nameless God in yet another disguise; although the reveal is followed by Balmur's departure from the party, and therefore Goldblum's departure from the show as a player, he continues to voice The Nameless God as an NPC for the rest of the series, although the character still uses other faces and voices. Goldblum is also credited for portraying Balmur in season 3, although he only provides opening narration.
- Ildrex Mystan (Russ D. More (Note: Credited as Russ D. More or simply Russ More depending on sources.)), a male monk who is a member of the Scaleskin, a rare dragon-like species, in campaign B. Curious and kind-hearted, he is a talented storyteller who worships Aijinder, the dragon god and god of will.
- Gaelle of House Vogelberg (Holly Billinghurst), a female Human warlock and Glom's sister in campaign B. The two were hired to deal with a group of Elven slaver. Following Balmur's departure and Gaelle's death, Billinghurst plays as The Nameless One having taken Gaelle's appearance and replacing her in the party.
- Glom of House Vogelberg (Sean Howard), a male Human fighter and Gaelle's brother in campaign B. Stubborn and often acting on whims, he only truly trusts Gaelle.
- Lirril (Tanja Milojevic), a female Deep Elf or "Delvin", a rare, subterranean subspecies of Elves capable of seeing in the dark and perceived by many as evil creatures, in campaign A. A magician inexperienced with the world above ground and unskilled at common language, she is originally introduced as an NPC voiced by Milojevic who has been captured, tortured and reduced to slavery together with her pet, the one-eyed, lemur-like chimera Riith. Both are rescued by Rowena and Father Westpike, after which Lirril, uninterested with going home, joins the party, now as a player character.
  - Before joining campaign A, Milojevic was briefly featured in the opening battle of campaign B as an unnamed female Dwarven Druid; as the character happened to die before doing anything or, Milojevic's participation in campaign B's opening episode was only briefly mentioned, and she returned as the NPC Lirril in campaign B.
- Elias "Payne" Embertree (Drew Tillman), a male Human who joins the party shortly after Lirril in campaign A. A dirty and evasive drunkard, he is hired by a friend of Father Westpike to assist the party, but continues travelling with them over shared faith to Celegon and unexpected past ties to The Nameless God. An unwanted child in the noble, cruel house of Embertree, he grew up frequently abused and tortured until running away when his father tried to sacrifice him to The Nameless God, turning to alcohol, the Church of Celegon and a life in hiding under many aliases all while living off odd jobs.
- Zaltanna Thunderheart (Casey Edison), a female dwarf part of a trio who briefly joins the party in campaign A, and a character from The Lucky Die.
- Lafian "Balance" Dath'Rodir (Arch), a male Elf part of a trio who briefly joins the party in campaign A, and a character from The Lucky Die.
- Rhal'Jakk Tesarran (Neil Martin), a male Scaleskin part of a trio who briefly joins the party campaign A, and a character from The Lucky Die.

Introduced in season 3

- Vind Greyview (Eric Nelsen), a male Elven rogue and a guest on the Willow's Wake. He is the leader of the Shade Elves clan, a position he inherited with the recent passing of his older brother. He uses a spear and throwing javelins. He, Agé and Nimble come from three different tribes all residing within the Blackstone Forest; following natural catastrophes which badly damaged their respective villages, the three, believing that gods of nature are upset with them, travel together to the gods' shrines in the hopes of appeasing them with gifts.
- Lady Vivianna Bloodchamber (LilyPichu), a female Tiefling rogue and a guest on the Willow's Wake. Young, slender and very tall, she comes from a wealthy family of known thieves and assassins. Insatiably curious, easily distracted and quickly bored, she tends to act mostly on impulse without worrying about consequences.
- Agé Ogun (Jasper William Cartwright), a male half-Orc warlock with elk-like horns and a member of the Sangoma Orc clan of the Blackstone Forest who is a guest on the Willow's Wake. After dying and being brought back to life prior to the events of the campaign, he is capable of summoning the minds and memories of his ancestors.
- Lady Lán Qiu (Sophie Yang), a female Human bard and a guest on the Willow's Wake. A charismatic noble of Asian-like ethnicity dressed in a qipao, she originates from mountains in Darleria, an area now cursed with darkness and undeath. She travels in a quest to recruit followers to help her free her land, but avoids fighting and prefers to let others take risks.
- Nimbleremble "Nimble" Troutspinetrout (Danilo Battistini), a male Halfling ranger and the local "hero" of his Halfling village in the Blackstone Forest, who is a guest on the Willow's Wake. Young, friendly and virtuous, he is very excited to go on his first adventure far from home.
- Yuehai (Sam Yeow), a female Halfling bard who is a musician and storyteller. She is the final member of the party, joining the others on the first stop of the Willow's Wake's journey rather than prior to its departure from Embergrad. She secretly suffers from a curse which allows her to turn into a crocodile.
- Konvo (Enrique Perez), a male fighter of mostly Orc descendance covered in tattoos, nicknamed "The Painted Man". He is a 45 years old experienced first mate and navigator, working on the Willow's Wake as a deckhand.
- Jare Driftwood (Florian Seidler), a 24-year-old male Human rogue working as the shipwright of the Willow's Wake. He travels with Ceelie, his female pet barn owl. He claims to originate from the town of Dochheim, in Vinnelhaven.

== Cast ==
=== Main cast ===
Individual	Character	Campaign			
Individual	Character	Domain of the Nameless God	The Long Road		Shores of the Silver Thrum
Individual	Character	Domain of the Nameless God	A	B	Shores of the Silver Thrum
Travis Vengroff	Gamemaster	Gamemaster			
Hem Cleveland (Note: Episodes 19 to 21 of season 2 are crossovers with The Lucky Die; for those episodes only, Hem Cleveland acts as co-gamemaster, while three players join Dark Dice as their The Luckie Die characters.)	Rowena Granitepike	Player		NPC	
Eyþór Viðarsson	Father Westpike	Player		NPC	
Peter Joseph Lewis	Soren Arkright	Player	NPC	Player	
David Ault	Iaus Innskeep	Player	NPC		
K. A. Statz	Sister Cavernsfall	Player	NPC		
K. A. Statz	Gamemaster				Gamemaster
Kessi Riliniki	Flygia of Zarketh	Player	NPC		
Tanja Milojevic (Note: Milojevic briefly portrayed an unnamed player character in the first episode of season 2's B campaign, in which her character dies in the opening scene. She then returned in the A campaign as Lirril, originally an NPC who becomes a player character in the episode "Nowhere to Return" after the party rescues her.)	Lirril		Player		
Drew Tillman	Elias "Payne"		Player		
Casey Edison	Zaltanna Thunderheart		Player		
Arch	Balance		Player		
Neil Martin	Rhal'Jakk Tesarran		Player		
Jeff Goldblum	Balmur		NPC	Player	NPC
Russ D. More	Ildrex Mystan			Player	
Holly Billinghurst	Gaelle Vogelberg			Player	
Sean Howard	Glom Vogelberg			Player	
Eric Nelsen	Vind Greyview				Player
LilyPichu	Vivianna Bloodchamber				Player
Jasper William Cartwright	Agé Ogun				Player
Sophie Yang	Lán Qiu				Player
Danilo Battistini	"Nimble" Troutspinetrout				Player
Sam Yeow	Yuehai				Player
Enrique Perez	Konvo				Player
Florian Seidler	Jare Driftwood				Player

=== Notable guests ===
In addition to acting as gamemaster and narrator, Vengroff also voices most NPCs in the first season; in subsequent seasons, all of them are re-dubbed by voice actors in post-production for the episode releases, although Vengroff still voices them during the original play sessions.

- Eric Nelsen as Coal (season 1), a man who travels with the party for a time
- Matthew Mercer as Riith (season 2), a cycloptic lemur
- Theo Merksamer as Aud & Barrin Innskeep, Iaus' children (seasons 1 & 2)
- Lani Minella as Gunther (season 2) and the Sunken Mother (Season 3)
- Karim Kronfli as Father Dormund, an old friend of Father Westpike (season 2) and Captain Gelmain, the Captain of the Willow's Wake (season 3)
- Carolyn Saint-Pé as Githa the Borge (season 2), the caretaker of the dream realm
- Ladybeard as Velen Ironshard (season 2), a ghost trapped within the dream realm
- Felix Trench as Nickrick (season 3)
- Nichole Goodnight as Eddel (season 3)
- Ciara Baxendale as Av Mitoph (season 3), the second mate of the Willow's Wake
- Peter Joseph Lewis as Ula (season 3)
- Beth Eyre as Sister Prina (season 3), a fortune teller in the Sunken Bulwark.

== Episodes ==
Volume	Episodes		Originally released	
Volume	Episodes		First released	Last released
1	16		September 25, 2018	January 14, 2021
2	36	15	February 26, 2021	March 23, 2023
2	36	21	June 11, 2024	April 16, 2025
3	TBD	10	June 20, 2023	March 23, 2023
3	TBD	TBD	June 9, 2026	TBD

=== Season 1: Domain of the Nameless God ===
No. overall	No. in season	Title	Duration	Original release date
1	–	"Dark Dice: Episode 0 – The Game (Note: Also released as "START HERE: A Guide to Dark Dice".)"	48 minutes	October 25, 2018
Welcome to Dark Dice! This episode explains how the Dark Dice podcast feed works, where to start with each season, and what the show is about.
2	1	"Chapter 1: The Silent One"	48 minutes	October 25, 2018
The team ventures into the Dead Pines to seek out the missing children of Ilmater's Hope. On the first step of their journey, they will discover something far more sinister...
3	2	"Chapter 2: Mindless"	47 minutes	December 4, 2018
Now hunted by the Silent One, the team hurries toward the campfire where the missing children were last spotted...
4	3	"Chapter 3: Captive"	39 minutes	February 6, 2019
With their foes defeated, the team moves to question the lone survivor...
5	4	"Chapter 4: Dead of Night"	53 minutes	March 12, 2019
The team cautiously pass through the ruins of an old village...
6	5	"Chapter 5: First Watch"	37 minutes	June 13, 2019
After a difficult battle, the team seek shelter for the long night ahead...
7	6	"Chapter 6: Dying Embers"	34 minutes	July 18, 2019
After certain unsettling events, the team endeavors to continue their long rest...
8	7	"Chapter 7: The Great Gate"	44 minutes	October 8, 2019
The team encounters a great stone gateway and a puzzle that blocks their path...
9	8	"Chapter 8: The Eternal Vigil"	46 minutes	October 24, 2019
The team passes through the great gate into the darkness beyond, where foul things lurk...
10	9	"Chapter 9: Tunnels"	54 minutes	December 24, 2019
The team explores passages beneath the earth and makes a terrible discovery...
11	10	"Chapter 10: Tortured"	35 minutes	February 21, 2020
Miles underground, the team suddenly finds themselves within a great forest...
12	11	"Chapter 11: Scars"	48 minutes	April 2, 2020
Well within the Roaming Forest, the team begins to question their senses and their memories...
13	12	"Chapter 12: Worse"	50 minutes	May 7, 2020
Well within the Roaming Forest, the team's watch falls asleep...
14	13	"Chapter 13: Silent Faithful"	36 minutes	September 4, 2020
Well within the Roaming Forest, the team finds that they are not alone.
15	14	"Chapter 14: Silent Faithful"	43 minutes	October 1, 2020
Well within the Roaming Forest, the team attempts to take their final rest.
16	15	"Chapter 15: The Void"	60 minutes	December 2, 2020
The team enters the ruinous domain of The Nameless God.
17	16	"Chapter 16: The Long March"	42 minutes	January 14, 2021
Every story has an end... and some endings are new beginnings.

=== Season 2: The Long Road ===
Note: the way episodes for the season are listed in regards to their respective campaigns vary depending on websites and applications.

No. overall	No. in season	Title	Duration	Original release date
18	1	"Recovery"	27 minutes	February 26, 2021
Campaign A Episode 1 Having failed in their quest, the survivors begin the long process of recovery from a terrible journey.
19	2	"Unavenged"	47 minutes	June 12, 2021
Campaign B Episode 1 A new chapter begins as five travelers find themselves in the captivity of Imperial Elven slavers.
20	3	"Quartet"	44 minutes	June 25, 2021
Campaign B Episode 2 Having survived their first encounter, the team seeks a safe place to rest.
21	4	"Sleepless"	49 minutes	August 29, 2021
Campaign B Episode 3 The team has issues sleeping, and also staying awake, as they discover that they are not alone...
22	5	"Lost"	62 minutes	December 3, 2021
Campaign B Episode 4 Hunted, the team struggles to find their way to Ilmater's Hope...
23	6	"Hero's Welcome"	45 minutes	February 15, 2022
Campaign B Episode 5 Now back into civilization, the team begins their investigation in Ilmater's Hope...
24	7	"The Worst Kinds of Monsters"	83 minutes	March 27, 2022
Campaign B Episode 6 The team continues their investigation into the monsters within Ilmater's Hope...
25	8	"Wild Sheep Chase"	65 minutes	April 16, 2022
Campaign B Episode 7 The team is pulled into a side quest most strange... Involving a sheep?
26	9	"Wizard Battle"	35 minutes	May 16, 2022
Campaign B Episode 8 The team finishes their wild sheep chase as they get involved in a wizard battle.
27	10	"Word Crafter"	32 minutes	June 17, 2022
Campaign B Episode 9 The team meets a creature that speaks with the voices of others, and attends a child's birthday celebration.
28	11	"Conspiracy"	94 minutes	October 16, 2022
Campaign B Episode 10; In pursuit of Rowena, the team reaches Audin.
29	12	"Unwelcome"	43 minutes	November 17, 2022
Campaign A Episode 2 The team returns to the church at Ilmater's Hope, but all is not well.
30	13	"Castigation"	37 minutes	January 16, 2023
Campaign A Episode 3 The team escapes Ilmater's Hope, and continues north.
31	14	"Questionable Associates"	43 minutes	February 16, 2023
Campaign A Episode 4 The team continues north and stops at the Riverside inn.
32	15	"Sidebar Skulk"	28 minutes	March 23, 2023
Campaign A Episode 5 The team enacts their plan to rescue the prisoners just outside the Riverside inn. Note: Season 2 entered a hiatus following this episode, and resumed after the completion of season 3; this is reflected in the episode numbers.
43	16	"Nowhere to Return"	33 minutes	June 11, 2024
Campaign A Episode 6 The team rests for the night, unaware that they are being pursued.
44	17	"Within the Hall of Bones"	33 minutes	June 25, 2024
Campaign A Episode 7 The team rests for the night, unaware that they are being pursued. Notes: The official summaries for episodes A6 and 7A are identical. Lirril, previously featured as an NPC, becomes a player character starting with this episode.
45	18	"Desperate Escape"	60 minutes	August 14, 2024
Campaign A Episode 8 The team attracts unwanted attention, and is forced to flee Audin.
46	19	"The Dreamweaver"	38 minutes	August 28, 2024
Campaign A Episode 9; first of three crossover episodes with The Lucky Die; Can the team navigate a realm of nightmares? I guess we're about to find out...
47	20	"The Dream is Over"	29 minutes	September 11, 2024
Campaign A Episode 10; second of three crossover episodes with The Lucky Die; Can the team navigate a realm of nightmares? I guess we're about to find out...
48	21	"A Dark Miracle"	31 minutes	September 23, 2024
Campaign A Episode 11; last of three crossover episodes with The Lucky Die; Can the team battle a god? I guess we're about to find out...

=== Season 3: Shores of the Silver Thrum ===
No. overall	No. in season	Title	Duration	Original release date
33	–	"Embark"	64 minutes	June 20, 2023
As waves crash and docks creek, it is time for the final two crew members to join the Willow's Wake.
34	1	"In the Willow's Wake"	50 minutes	July 4, 2023
As waves crash and docks creek, five adventurers book passage on The Willow's Wake, into the frozen north.
35	2	"The Calm"	44 minutes	July 18, 2023
Those aboard the Willow's Wake find ways to keep entertained on the open sea as they travel toward their first destination.
36	3	"Lure"	50 minutes	August 1, 2023
The Willow's Wake faces an unexpected and deadly threat.
37	4	"The Sunken Bulwark"	48 minutes	August 15, 2023
As personal agendas come into conflict, the Willow arrives at its first destination.
38	5	"The Storyteller & the Pirate"	48 minutes	August 30, 2023
As personal agendas come into conflict, the Willow arrives at its first destination.
39	6	"Betrayal"	94 minutes	September 27, 2023
Jare explores the treasury while the others seek out the Diviner Shell Cave.
40	7	"Last Light"	40 minutes	September 27, 2023
The Last Light Ritual begins...
41	8	"A Mother's Scorn"	25 minutes	April 9, 2024
Consequences manifest as Vivianna disrupts the most sacred Ritual of Last Light.
42	9	"Chasing Shadows"	77 minutes	May 14, 2024
The crew search the holds for a murderer while tensions rise...
43	10	"The Tempest"	41 minutes	May 28, 2024
The Willow's Wake finds itself within a terrible tempest.

=== Bonus episodes ===
Title	Duration	Original release date
"Meet the Innskeep"	9 minutes	November 2, 2018
Before the journey begins we meet one of the characters, Iaus Innskeep, a tiefling assassin voiced by David Ault.
"Meet the Bard"	12 minutes	December 31, 2018
As we continue the journey we learn more about the peculiar past of Rowena Granitepike, a dwarven bard voiced by Hem Cleveland.
"Meet the Paladin"	7 minutes	April 23, 2019
As we continue the journey we learn more about Sister Tsavorite Cavernsfall, a dwarven paladin voiced by Kaitlin Statz.
"Meet the Cleric"	17 minutes	August 19, 2019
As we continue the journey we learn more about Father Sindri Westpike, the old dwarven cleric voiced by Eyþór Viðarsson.
"Behind the Music"	17 minutes	January 21, 2020
This week we talk about how the music to Dark Dice was made! We also discuss working with a 40 person choir, creating music for horror, and some of the strange happenings in the process. We talk with Hem Cleveland, Travis Vengroff, Enzo Puzzovio, Ryan McQuinn, and Steven Melin.
"Meet the Druid"	28 minutes	June 13, 2020
One of the travelers kept a journal. Let us learn more about Flygia, the Druid of Zarketh and discover what really happened, from her perspective.
"Pride Month: Tiefling in the Details"	122 minutes	January 15, 2021
This special episode of Dark Dice takes place in a possible future, one where Iaus Innskeep survives the trials of Domain of the Nameless God... and decides to sign up for speed dating.
"Pride Month: A Date With Uriel"	26 minutes	January 16, 2021
The following episode is one that our fans voted for, and THE possible epilogue should Iaus Innskeep survive the trails to come...
"Holiday Team Meeting & Reading"	88 minutes	January 6, 2022
This week we have three stories, all fan submitted - the winners of our Fan Fiction competition! We also have a chat with the cast of Dark Dice!
"Iaus chats with D&D in a Castle"	25 minutes	June 21, 2022
This is not an episode of Dark Dice. Instead, Iaus Innskeep is chatting with patrons at his new tavern!
"Meet the Rogue"	7 minutes	August 15, 2022
As we continue the journey we learn more about the history of Vinnelhaven and one of its more infamous pirates - Gaelle Vogelburg.
"Dark Dice: Behind the Screen: Co-DM'ing & D&D in a Castle Review"	20 minutes	October 3, 2022
This week Kaitlin & Travis chat about our adventures at D&D In a Castle!
"Icelandic Wedding & Creepy Dolls"	51 minutes	May 16, 2022
Our lovely cast members got married this month at their beautiful home in Iceland. They met while recording Dark Dice & The White Vault. In this episode we chat about Iceland, Vestmannaeyjar (Westman Islands), wedding hijinks, a bird called the Hrossagaukur, Icelandic horses, the ferry, elephant rock, wildlife, animal rescue, a bird that thinks she's a human, and creepy dolls!
"The Birth of Myth: An interview with Yoshitaka Amano"	15 minutes	February 8, 2024
Interview conducted by Travis Vengroff, Yoshitaka Amano, and Akiko Mukae
"What's it like as a player? (on Dark Dice)"	64 minutes	June 8, 2024
This week we chat with Florian Seidler about what it's like to roll the Dark Dice... As a player.
"Meet the Survivor"	20 minutes	August 23, 2024
As we continue the journey we learn more about young Elias Embertree, also known as "Payne."

== Reception ==
=== Critical reception ===
The Syfy Wire commented on the podcast that "the show edits out the pauses that naturally come while playing D&D, re-records NPC voices with trained voice actors, and scores the whole thing with Foley work, an orchestra featuring more than 30 medieval instruments, and a live 40-person choir singing in Icelandic, Elvish, and more."

In 2020, the Audio Fiction and Arts Festival included Dark Dice in their Gold Listening Showcase Official Selection.

== Awards and nominations ==
Year	Award	Category	Recipient	Result	Citation
2020	Audio Verse Awards	Best Instrumental Composition in a Production	"Danse Sanguis" - Steven Melin and Travis Vengroff	Won	
2020	Audio Verse Awards	Best Vocal Composition in a Production	"Devil's Gamble" - Steven Melin and Travis Vengroff	Won	
2020	Audio Verse Awards	Best Vocal Composition in a Production	"Funeral Song 1" - Hem Cleveland and Eyþór Viðarsson	Won	
2020	Audio Verse Awards	Best Player Direction in a Production	Travis Vengroff	Won	
2021	Audio Verse Awards	Best Improvised Production	Dark Dice	Won	
2021	Audio Verse Awards	Best Player Direction in a Production	Travis Vengroff	Won	
2021	Audio Verse Awards	Best Player in a Production	Russ D. More	Won	
2021	New Jersey Web Festival Awards	Best Sound Design in an Actual Play Production	Travis Vengroff	Won	
2022	Audio Verse Awards	Best Improvised Production	Dark Dice	Won	
2022	Audio Verse Awards	Best Player Direction in a Production	Travis Vengroff	Won	
2022	Audio Verse Awards	Best Player in a Production	Jeff Goldblum	Won	
2022	Audio Verse Awards	Best Player in a Production	Russ D. More	Won	
2022	Miami Web Festival Awards	Best Podcast Director	Travis Vengroff	Nominated	
2022	Miami Web Festival Awards	Best Actor/Performer in a Podcast	Jeff Goldblum	Won	
2022	New Jersey Web Festival Awards	Outstanding Actual Play Podcast (D&D)	Dark Dice	Won	
2023	Rio WebFest	Best Actual Play	Dark Dice	Nominated	
2023	New Jersey Web Festival Awards	Best Editing in an Actual Play Production	Travis Vengroff, Dayn Russell Leonardson, Kaela Shoe	Won	
2023	Melbourne WebFest	Best Game Master	K.A. Statz, Travis Vengroff	Won	
2023	Apulita Web fest	Best Actual Play	Dark Dice	Nominated	
2023	Minnesota Web Fest	Best Overall Podcast	Dark Dice	Nominated	
2023	Minnesota Web Fest	Best Fantasy Award	Dark Dice	Nominated	
2023	Minnesota Web Fest	Best Original Score in a Podcast	Brandon Boone, Hitoshi Sakimoto, David Wise, Yuzo Koshiro, Ryan McQuinn, Steven Melin, and Travis Vengroff	Nominated	
2023	NZ Web Fest	Best Cast	Jeff Goldblum, LilyPichu, Eric Nelsen, Florian Seidler, Jasper William Cartwright, Sam Yeow, Danilo Battistini, Sophie Yang, Jack Falahee	Nominated	
2023	NZ Web Fest	Best Actual Play Podcast	Dark Dice	Nominated	
2023	Indie Series Awards	Best Audio Fiction Series	Dark Dice - Dallas Wheatley and Travis Vengroff	Nominated	
2023	Indie Series Awards	Best Actor - Audio Fiction	Jeff Goldblum	Won	
2023	Indie Series Awards	Best Original Score	Brandon Boone, Hitoshi Sakimoto, Steven Melin and Travis Vengroff	Nominated	
2023	Baltimore Next Media Web Fest	Best Actual Play	Dark Dice	Won	
2023	Baltimore Next Media Web Fest	Best Director of an Actual Play	K.A. Statz, Travis Vengroff	Won	
2023	Baltimore Next Media Web Fest	Best Writing (Actual Play)	K.A. Statz, Travis Vengroff	Won	
2023	Baltimore Next Media Web Fest	Best GM (Actual Play)	K.A. Statz, Travis Vengroff	Won	
2023	Baltimore Next Media Web Fest	Best Performance in an Actual Play	Jeff Goldblum, Peter Joseph Lewis	Won	
2023	Baltimore Next Media Web Fest	Best Score in an Actual Play	Steven Melin, Travis Vengroff, Brandon Boone, Hitoshi Sakimoto, Yuzo Koshiro, David Wise, Ryan McQuinn, Sam Yeow	Won	
2023	Baltimore Next Media Web Fest	Best Sound Design in an Actual Play	Travis Vengroff, Dayn Russell Leonardson, Marisa Ewing, Kaela Shoe, Shion Francois	Won	
2023	Signal Awards	Best Sound Design	Travis Vengroff	Won	
2023	Signal Awards	Best Sound Design (Listener's Choice)	Travis Vengroff	Won	
2023	Signal Awards	Most Innovative Audio Experience	Dark Dice	Won	
2023	Signal Awards	Most Innovative Audio Experience (Listener's Choice)	Dark Dice	Won	
2023	Signal Awards	Best Original Score	Brandon Boone, Hitoshi Sakimoto, Steven Melin and Travis Vengroff	Nominated	
Best Original Score (Listener's Choice)	Signal Awards	Won	Brandon Boone, Hitoshi Sakimoto, Steven Melin and Travis Vengroff		
