= Liberty (franchise) =

Science fiction media franchise

- Created by: Travis Vengroff
- Original work: Liberty: Defiance (2010)
- Owners: Travis Vengroff; K. A. Statz
- Years: 2010–present

Print publications
- Book(s): Atrius: A Citizen's Guide (2016); Liberty: Fringe Iconography Guidebook (2020)
- Comics: Liberty: Defiance (2010); Liberty: Deception (2016-2018); Liberty: Bridget Goes on a Date (2018)

Games
- Role-playing: Liberty: A.F.T.E.R (2018)

Audio
- Radio program(s): Liberty: Critical Research (2015-2017); Liberty: Tales From the Tower (2016-2021); Liberty: Vigilance (2018)

Liberty is a science fiction media franchise and shared fictional universe created by Travis Vengroff. It premiered via a self-released comic book titled Liberty: Defiance in 2010, and has since extended to other media. Liberty comic books are written by Vengroff, while fiction podcasts are directed and produced by Vengroff and written by his wife K. A. Statz. The franchise alternatively uses the name The Liberty Podcast to separate itself from similarly titled unrelated works.

Each work in the franchise tells a stand-alone story set within the same universe. Liberty takes place on a failed Earth terraforming mining colony on a desert-like planet beyond Earth's Solar System, which has been cut off from the rest of humanity for centuries. Over time, resource scarcity led to schisms in the population within Atrius, the planet's vast sole city, and the only area in which Humans live; Atrius is now split between a police state ruled by a totalitarian regime, and the Fringe, a post-apocalyptic-like area populated by lawless gangs.

Vengroff originally conceptualized and developed the world of Liberty for seven years, first as an idea for a film. After concluding that a film was unrealistic for financial reasons and turning to comic books, Defiance in 2010 was unsuccessful and remained an obscure one-off work. In 2015, Fool and Scholar Productions was formed to venture into creating fiction podcasts, premiering with the release of the serialized podcast Liberty: Critical Research, which was a success, and led to the expansion of the franchise (as well as the development of several unrelated Fool and Scholar Productions works). Subsequent works included the comic book Liberty: Deception, the anthology podcast Liberty: Tales From the Tower, and the actual play podcast Liberty: Vigilance, which uses Liberty: A.F.T.E.R, a tabletop role-playing game part of the franchise. All Liberty works have completed their runs, with the exception of Tales from the Tower, which is still ongoing.

== Releases ==
=== Comic books ===
==== Liberty: Defiance (2010) ====
Vengroff completed Defiance in 2010, consisting of about eighteen pages; he hoped to turn it into a full comic book series, but was unsuccessful in selling it to any publisher. He stated in 2016 (translated from Russian): "It took me almost a year to realize that no one would buy this. It took a few more years to realize that it looked like something I would not have liked as a reader myself." In the following years, 3200 copies were given away at various events throughout Florida like Free Comic Book Day and Tampa Bay Comic Con to build interest in the series.

==== Liberty: Deception (2016-present) ====
The "Zero Issue" of Deception, acting as an introduction to the rest of the comic, was officially released at the Chicago Comic & Entertainment Expo in 2016, after years of Vengroff promoting the comic book to several publishers, including by giving away over 3200 copies at various events throughout Florida like Free Comic Book Day and Tampa Bay Comic Con. The first volume was released at New York Comic Con in October 2016.

In August 2018, a Liberty: Deception motion comic was released in collaboration with the Florida-based video game production team Astro Crow, featuring voice actors Jon St. John, Lani Minella, and Dave Fennoy.

==== Liberty: Bridget Goes on a Date (2018) ====
Liberty: Bridget Goes on a Date, written by Vengroff, drawn by Karl Moline and including characters from the Deception series, was released on June 9, 2018, with a dedicated event at Gods and Monsters in Orlando, Florida on June 9, 2018.

=== Picture books ===
==== Atrius: A Citizen's Guide (2016) ====
Atrius: A Citizen's Guide is a picture book published in 2016 by John Dossinger Publishing, made available to Patreon supporters of Fool and Scholar Productions. Written as a guidebook existing within the Liberty universe, it explores the history and lore of Atrius.

==== Liberty: Fringe Iconography Guidebook (2020) ====
Liberty: Fringe Iconography Guidebook is another picture book presented as an 28-pages in-universe guidebook, written from the perspective of Dr. Martollow Kovski, the main protagonist of the Critical Research podcast; it is dedicated to the iconography of the Fringers.

=== Podcasts ===
==== Liberty: Critical Research (2015-2017) ====
Consisting of two seasons released between 2015 and 2017, Critical Research follows a team of five individuals from the city, led by Dr. Martollow Kovski, who set out to the Southern Fringe in order to study and learn more about its inhabitants, unprepared for the trials to come.

==== Liberty: Tales From the Tower (2016-2025) ====
Consisting of four seasons released between 2016 and 2025 (2021-2025 on YouTube), Tales From the Tower is a horror anthology. The first two and a half seasons consisted solely of stand-alone episodes, while the last half of season three and half of season four each consisted of one serialized story, distinct for both. To celebrate the Liberty podcast's 10th year anniversary, the entire first season of Tales from the Tower was re-written, re-recorded, and re-released over the summer and fall of 2025, replacing the original episodes.

==== Liberty: Tales From the Tower Japanese Adaptation (2025) ====
In 2025, Fool & Scholar Productions partnered with TTS Products Inc and director Yoshitaka Hirota to adapt and reimagine Tales From the Tower to Japanese as "リバティ 塔からの物語." The first season of the Japanese adaptation features a mix of stories from the original first two seasons. Recording took place in Tokyo Japan in May, 2025 and the first season began release in October 2025. Within the first week, the show was the #1 Fiction Podcast, and #1 Sci-fi podcast in Japan.

==== Liberty: Vigilance (2018) ====
An actual play podcast using the Liberty: A.F.T.E.R tabletop role-playing game, consisting of a single season of 13 episodes released in 2018. It features the voice talents of Ashly Burch, Eric Nelsen, Dave Fennoy, Lani Minella, and George Lowe.

=== Role-playing game (2018) ===
Liberty: A.F.T.E.R is a tabletop role-playing game based on the Liberty universe, using a modified version of the open-source rules from Dungeons & Dragons 5th edition. Players can play as either Citizens or Fringers. Artists who worked on the Liberty comics helped illustrate the rulebook.

== Reception ==
Critical Research was a Parsec Award finalist in 2016 under the category of Best New Speculative Fiction Team, as well as an Audio Verse Award finalist in 2016 for Best Writing of an Original, Long Form, Small Cast, Ongoing Production, and Best Performance of an Actor in an Original Leading Role for a Short Form Production.

Deception's "Zero Issue" received praise for its unique art style, paneling, detailed universe, use of dialects, and for its limited edition cover by Dave Dorman.

Vigilance has received praise for its audio design and was nominated for several Audio Verse Awards in the fields of audio design, production, and acting.
