= K. A. Statz =

American science fiction and horror writer and podcaster

- Born: Kaitlin Statz
- Education: University of Oxford
- Spouse: Travis Vengroff (m. 2016)
- Writing career
- Pen name: K.A. Statz, Kaitlin Statz
- Language: English
- Years active: 2014–present
- Genres: Horror, paranormal, short stories, post-apocalyptic, adventure, drama, comedy
- Website: www.statzink.com

Kaitlin Statz is an American science fiction and horror writer and podcaster, publishing works as K. A. Statz. She is known for her work on the podcasts The White Vault, VAST Horizon, Liberty, Don't Mind, The Boar Knight, and Dark Dice.

== Career and works ==
=== Podcasting career ===
Statz started creating fiction podcasts with Travis Vengroff in 2015, with the premiere of the audio drama series Liberty: Critical Research. Statz co-founded Fool & Scholar Productions with Vengroff. The duo were Parsec Awards finalists in 2016 under the category of 'Best New Speculative Fiction Team', and Critical Research was an Audio Verse Award finalist in 2016 for writing and acting. Later the same year, Statz and Vengroff expanded the Liberty podcast to include Tales from the Tower, an anthology horror series set in the same world as the other Liberty stories.

In October 2017, Statz created the found footage horror fiction audio drama The White Vault. The podcast has received positive critical reviews, and appeared on the top 10 chart for The Arts and Performing Arts on iTunes, and the top 50 chart for 'All of iTunes' in the US. The White Vault has won 2018 Mark Time Award, two Webby Honorees, and twenty-three Audio Verse Awards. In addition to the core show, Statz created and wrote multiple White Vault miniseries including Artifact, Imperial, Iluka, and Avrum.

In 2018 Statz & Vengroff released Liberty: Vigilance, a play audio drama podcast featuring Wayne June from Darkest Dungeon, Ashly Burch, Sainty & Eric Nelsen, Dave Fennoy, Lani Minella, and George Lowe.

In late 2018, the duo also released Dark Dice, a horror actual play podcast, which was featured on various iTunes Top 10 charts for the US, UK, and Canada. Additionally, Statz also won the Audio Drama Hub (ADPP) Scriptwriting Competition, and her work Selling Ledford Manor was performed in front of a live audience in London.

In 2019, Statz premiered VAST Horizon, a science fiction audio drama featuring strong female protagonists and no narration. VAST Horizon has received critical praise for its sound design and writing, winning 7 Audio Verse Awards, and a 2020 W3 Silver Award. Statz is one of the founding members of the Audio Drama Coalition, the founding member of the Audio Drama Roundtable, a member of the Audio Drama Hub. Statz has given lectures and panels at New York Comic Con, The Austin Film Festival, Podfest, Podtales, Podcon, and Emerald City Comic Con. Statz became a full time podcaster in 2019.

=== Written works ===
Statz was a contributor to the Russian magazine Mir Fantastiki from 2016 to 2018, interviewing artists and covering events for film and television. Statz has also released a number of supplemental Liberty stories and books.

== Awards and honors ==
Year	Award	Category	Citation
2016	The Parsec Awards	Best New Speculative Fiction Podcaster/Team (2016)	
2018	Mark Time Award	Silver Award, The Ogle For Horror (The White Vault)	
2018	Audio Verse Award	Finalist: Best Writing (The White Vault)	
2018	Audio Drama Hub (ADPP) Scriptwriting Competition	Best Writing (Selling Ledford Manor)	
2018-2020	HEAR Now: Audio Fiction and Arts Festival	The Gold Listening Showcase Official Selection 2018 (Liberty: Tales from the Tower, "Excuse Me"); The Gold Listening Showcase Official Selection 2018 (The White Vault); The Gold Listening Showcase Official Selection 2020 (VAST Horizon, Dark Dice, Liberty: Tales from the Tower "Happiness"); The Platinum Listening Showcase Official Selection 2020 (The White Vault)	
2019	Discover Pod Award	Finalist: (Best Fiction Podcast)	
2020	The W3 Awards	Silver Award - Best Fiction Podcast (VAST Horizon)	
2019 & 2020	Audio Verse Awards	Best Writing of a New Audio Play Production (The White Vault: Imperial - 2019); Best Writing of a New Audio Play Production (VAST Horizon, 2019); Best New Audio Play Production (The White Vault: Imperial, 2019); Best Audio Play Production (The White Vault, 2019); Best Writing of a New Audio Play Production (The White Vault: Iluka, 2020); Best Writing of an Audio Play Production (The White Vault, 2020); Best Writing of an Audio Play Production (VAST Horizon, 2020); Best New Audio Play Production (The White Vault: Iluka, 2020); Best Audio Play Production (The White Vault, 2020)	
2021	New Jersey Web Fest	Outstanding Horror/Thriller - Winner (The White Vault)	
2021	Webby Award	People's Voice Award Winner for Scripted Fiction Podcast	
