= Travis Vengroff =

American podcaster and musician

- Born: 1987 (age 38–39); Centerport, New York, U.S.
- Education: Allegro Music Academy; Art Institute of Pittsburgh; New York Film Academy; University of South Florida
- Occupations: Podcast director; podcast producer; podcast sound designer; podcast editor; composer; musician; actor; comic book writer; role-playing game designer
- Years active: 2005–present
- Spouse: Kaitlin Statz (m. 2016)
- Parents: Harvey Vengroff; Carol Vengroff
- Website: http://www.TravisVengroff.com

Travis Vengroff (born January 20, 1987) is an American podcast maker, comic book writer, composer, musician, actor, and role-playing game designer. He is best known for his fiction podcasts as part of the company Fool and Scholar Productions, founded and owned by him and his wife K. A. Statz.

Vengroff usually acts as director, producer, sound designer, and editor of Fool and Scholar Productions' works, with Statz as writer. He has also composed and performed music and voice acted in their works, and is the gamemaster of the actual play podcast Dark Dice (2018–present). Some of his other best known podcasts include The White Vault (2017–2026) and those part of the Liberty universe (2015–present), which he created.

Outside of podcasts, Vengroff is a member of the band Careless Juja and former member of Random Encounter, both under the stage name Careless. He has also written several Liberty comic books and picture books since 2010, and has developed tabletop role-playing games based on the universes of both Dark Dice and Liberty.

== Early life ==
Vengroff was born in Centerport, New York, in 1987 to Harvey and Carol Vengroff, with the family moving to Sarasota, Florida, when Travis was three-years old. He had four siblings. Harvey was the founder and owner of Vengroff Williams Inc., a housing company, for over 50 years, and also worked at a debt collection agency.

As a child, Vengroff liked to listen to audiobooks, something he credits to eventually leading him to podcasts. In 2006–2009, Travis Vengroff studied music at the Allegro Music Academy, game design at the Art Institute of Pittsburgh, acting at the New York Film Academy, and business management at the University of South Florida.

Travis and his brother Mark worked at Vengroff Williams Inc. in 2011. From 2013 to 2019, he also worked with his father and brother in real estate in Sarasota, Bradenton, Orlando, and Memphis.

== Career ==
=== Random Encounter (2005–2015) ===
In 2005, Vengroff, under the stage name Careless, was a founding member of the band Random Encounter, specialized in covers of video game music and original music inspired by video games. He mainly played the accordion, while also performing vocals and the glockenspiel. The band was voted by readers of Orlando Weekly as the Best Folk Act in Central Florida (2011), the Best Indie Act in Central Florida (2012) and the Best Rock Act in Central Florida (2013).

In 2006, Vengroff directed a Resident Evil fan-made short film titled Resident Evil: Operation Mad Jackal, together with Kit Pennebaker. The film featured over 60 actors, and the crew received permission from the city of Sarasota to shut down part of the city's Main Street to film a scene. Vengroff stated in July 2006 that the film would premiere at a convention the following October.

In 2010, he completed Liberty: Defiance, a comic book he wrote based on the science fiction Liberty fictional universe he had developed over the previous years; he had hoped to turn it into a full comic book series, but was unsuccessful in selling it to any publisher.

Vengross, still using the name Careless, founded a second band in 2011, Careless Juja, together with fellow video game music cover artist The Great Juja. The band took part in the Dwelling of Duels internet music competition and won five awards from 2011 to 2019. They would release several albums, and are still currently active.

Among Random Encounter's releases during his time with them were studio album Unavenged in 2011 and Let Me Tell You a Story in 2013. On October 3, 2015, Random Encounter performed a show in Orlando titled "Farewell Careless / 10 Year Anniversary Concert", acting as both a celebration of the band's first ten years and the farewell show of Careless, who was leaving the band.

=== Fool and Scholar Productions (2015–present) ===
In 2015, Vengroff and his romantic partner (later wife) Kaitlin Statz decided to venture into audio fiction, creating the company Fool and Scholar Productions to produce fiction podcasts. Their first release later the same year was Liberty: Critical Research, a return to Vengroff's science fiction Liberty fictional universe; in the style the two would follow in their future podcasts, Vengroff directed, produced, edited and sound designed the podcast while Statz was the writer; Vengroff also voiced one of the main characters, Officer Severous Ljqvist. The series was an unexpected success, and led to the development of Liberty into a multimedia franchise.

In addition to two more seasons of Critical Research, two more Liberty podcasts were produced: Liberty: Tales From the Tower, a horror anthology podcast that run from four seasons from 2016 and 2021, and Liberty: Vigilance, a one-season actual play podcast made in 2018 using Liberty: A.F.T.E.R, a tabletop role-playing game designed by Vengroff and released the same year. It also lead to the release of two more Liberty comic books written by Vengroff, including the serialized Liberty: Deception, and two Liberty picture books co-authored by Vengroff and Statz. The first volume was released at New York Comic Con in October 2016.

In 2017, Fool and Scholar Productions released their first Liberty-unrelated work found footage horror podcast The White Vault, about a group of individuals sent to the Norwegian archipelago of Svalbard to investigate a remote outpost gone radio silent after sending a distress signal. The show lasted for a five seasons-run completed in 2022, and was accompanied by several spin-off shows set in the same universe, released between 2018 and 2023.

Dark Dice, a horror-dark fantasy actual play podcast, premiered in 2018, with Vengroff acting as gamemaster. It emphasized the potential deaths of all player characters, with campaigns including, among others, Statz (who joined Vengroff as co-gamemaster from season 3 onwards), Jeff Goldblum, Eric Nelsen, LilyPichu, and many voice actors featured in other works of Fool and Scholar Productions; it is still ongoing. Vengroff also contributed as a composer and musician, directed an orchestra, a 40-person choir, and more than 30 medieval instruments for the soundtrack of the Dark Dice podcast. The tabletop role-playing game Domain of the Nameless God, designed by Vengroff and based on the universe of Dark Dice, was released on 2023 by Dungeon Masters Guild.

Vengroff and Statz also published VAST Horizon, a three-season science fiction story released from 2019 to 2021 about the passenger of a spaceship who awakens from stasis to find the spaceship empty and failing, and must survive and investigate with the help of the ship's artificial intelligence. Don't Mind: Cruxmont, a mystery story intended to be the first season of a Don't Mind anthology series made of stand-alone seasons, was released in 2022, starring Adjoa Andoh and Marcus Bentley as two strangers who meet on their way to the small elusive town of Cruxmont, both in search of answers. It was followed by The Boar Knight, a 15-episode family-friendly fantasy series released bi-monthly from October 2022 to June 2023.

=== Other works ===
From 2013 to 2018, Vengroff was a regular contributor to the Russian science fiction and fantasy magazine Mir Fantastiki. Since 2018, several adventures for Dungeons & Dragons on the DM's Guild became Platinum bestsellers.

== Works ==
=== Comic books ===
Year	Title	Writer	Notes
2010	Liberty: Defiance	Yes	Never fully published
2016–present	Liberty: Deception	Yes	
2018	Liberty: Bridget Goes on a Date	Yes	Deception spin-off

=== Discography ===
Careless Juja

- Pixel Glass (2011)
- Prof. Layton and the Bay Harbor Butcher (2014)
- Legend of the Boar Knight (2015)
- For Naughty Children (EP, 2015)
- Careless Juja World Tour Live Album (live album, 2017)
- Those Who Fight (2020)

Dark Dice soundtracks

- Gamble Your Sanity (2021)
- Season of the Allshadow (2022)

Random Encounter

- Neo Symbiance (EP, 2006)
- Random Encounter (EP, 2010)
- Unavenged (2011)
- Let Me Tell You a Story (2013)
- The Big Blue LP (2014)
- Super Galaxy Squadron Original Soundtrack (2015)

Guest Appearances

- Welcome to World 2 - Game Music 4 All (2008)
- Bitavenged - Bitavenged (2012)
- Spectrum of Mana - Nate Horsefall (2013)
- Final Fantasy VII Gametabs Tribute Album - Gametabs.net (2014)
- Super VG Christmas Party - Patient Corgi (2014, with Random Encounter)
- Rogue Legacy: Reborn- Tettix & A Shell in the Pit (2014)
- The Legend of Zelda Tribute Album - Gametabs.net (2015)
- SOUND WAVES: A Tribute to Ecco the Dolphin - Patient Corgi (2016)
- Tribute Album 64 - Patient Corgi (2016)
- Video Games Live: Bonus Round 3 - Video Games Live (2016)
- Chronicles of Time - Nate Horsefall (2016)
- Final Fantasy I - The Legacy - Pixel Mixers (2017)
- SPIRA: Music from Final Fantasy X (Zanarkand Mix) - Materia Collective (2017)
- Secret of Mana - Whispers from a Verdant Grove - Pixel Mixers (2018)
- EIDOLON: Music From Final Fantasy IX - Materia Collective (2019)

=== Filmography ===
Year	Title	Director	Producer	Editor	Actor	Notes
2006	Resident Evil: Operation Mad Jackal	Yes	No	No	—N/a	Fan-made Resident Evil short film
2008	Killing Values	No	Yes	Yes	—N/a	Short film

=== Picture books ===
Year	Title	Writer	Notes
2016	Atrius: A Citizen's Guide	Yes	Part of the Liberty universe
2020	Liberty: Fringe Iconography Guidebook	Yes	

=== Podcasts ===
==== Actual play series ====
Year	Title	Director	Writer	Producer	Editor	Sound designer	Composer	Actor		Notes
2018–present	Dark Dice	Yes	Yes	Yes	Yes	Yes	Yes	Main	Gamemaster	Also music editor, musical director and musician
2018	Liberty: Vigilance	Yes	Yes	Yes	Yes	Yes	No	Recurring	Newscaster, others	Also musical director
2018–2019	The Lucky Die	No	No	No	No	No	No	Recurring	Onorino / Others	

==== Scripted series ====
Year	Title	Director	Producer	Editor	Sound designer	Composer	Actor		Notes
2015–2017	Liberty: Critical Research	Yes	Yes	Yes	Yes	Yes	Main	Severous Ljqvist	
2016–2021	Liberty: Tales From the Tower	Yes	Yes	Yes	Yes	Yes	Recurring	Yamada / Media Director, various others	Host in season 1 Credited as sound designer and composer as part of Careless Juja; Also writer on "Malfunction" and "Nightmares"
2019	Creepy	No	Yes	No	No	No	No	—N/a	Episode: "Robert the Doll"
2017–present	The White Vault	Yes	Yes	Yes	Yes	Yes	Recurring	Various	Also music editor
2018	The White Vault: Artifact	Yes	Yes	Yes	Yes	No	Recurring	Artifact	Also music editor and musical director
2019	The White Vault: Imperial	Yes	Yes	Yes	Yes	No	No	—N/a	
2019–2021	VAST Horizon	Yes	Yes	Yes	Yes	No	Recurring	Various	Also music editor and musician
2019–present	Counterbalance	No	No	No	No	No	Main	Auril	
2020	The White Vault: Iluka	Yes	Yes	Yes	Yes	No	No	—N/a	Also musical director and music editor
2021	The White Vault: Avrum	Yes	Yes	Yes	Yes	No	Guest	Cossack 3	Also musical director and musician
2021	Someone Dies in This Elevator	No	No	No	No	No	Guest	Gilgamesh	Episode: "Most Secure Vault"
2022	Don't Mind: Cruxmont	Yes	Yes	Yes	Yes	No	Guest	Deep Elder	
2022–2023	The Boar Knight	Yes	Yes	Yes	Yes	Yes	Recurring	Various	Also writer on 4 episodes and theme song lyricist
2023	The White Vault: Echoes	Yes	Yes	Yes	Yes	No	No	—N/a	

==== Others ====
Year	Title	Director	Writer	Producer	Editor	Sound designer	Composer	Actor	Notes
2016	Enderal: The Shards of Order	No	No	No	No	No	No	Various	Video game mod of The Elder Scrolls V: Skyrim
2019	The White Vault: A Musical	Yes	Yes	Yes	Yes	Yes	Yes	—N/a	Musical parody episode of the first two seasons of The White Vault; Also lyricist
2021	Role & Keep	No	No	No	No	No	No	Renny	Actual play web series Episode: "The Ghost Light"
2021	Pride Month: Tiefling in the Details	No	Yes	Yes	Yes	Yes	Yes	Narrator / Gilzog	Comedy non-canon spin-off episode of Dark Dice
2021	Pride Month: A Date With Uriel	No	Yes	Yes	Yes	Yes	Yes	—N/a	Follow-up to Tiefling in the Details

=== Role-playing games ===
Year	Title	Designer	Writer	Notes
2018	Liberty: A.F.T.E.R	Yes	Yes	
2023	Domain of the Nameless God	Yes	Yes	Based on the universe of Dark Dice

== Personal life ==
Vengroff married frequent collaborator Kaitlin Statz on October 2, 2016. As of 2020, the couple resided in Portland, Oregon, with their adopted dog Eezo. In August 2021, the couple moved to Germany.

Vengroff's father Harvey died on October 11, 2018, at age 77.

== Awards and nominations ==
Year	Award	Category	Work	Result	Citation
2011	Orlando Weekly	Best Folk Act in Central Florida	Random Encounter	Won	
2012	Orlando Weekly	Best Indie Act in Central Florida	Random Encounter	Won	
2013	Orlando Weekly	Best Rock Act in Central Florida	Random Encounter	Won	
2016	Parsec Awards	Best New Speculative Fiction Team	Liberty: Critical Research	Nominated	
2018	Audio Verse Awards	Best Production	The White Vault	Nominated	
2018	Audio Verse Awards	Best Audio Engineering	The White Vault	Nominated	
2019	Audio Verse Award	Best Audio Play Production	The White Vault	Won	
2019	Audio Verse Award	Best Action Sound Design in a Production	The White Vault	Won	
2019	Audio Verse Award	Best Environment Sound Design in a Production	The White Vault	Won	
2019	Audio Verse Award	Best New Audio Play Production	The White Vault: Imperial	Won	
2019	Audio Verse Award	Best Environment Sound Design in a New Production	The White Vault: Imperial	Won	
2019	Audio Verse Award	Best Vocal Composition in a Production	The White Vault: A Musical	Won	
2019	Discover Pod Award	Best Fiction Podcast	The White Vault	Nominated	
2019	Webby Awards	Best Original Music / Sound Design in Podcasting	The White Vault	Nominated	
2020	Audio Verse Awards	Best Instrumental Composition in a Production	Dark Dice - "Danse Sanguis"	Won	
2020	Audio Verse Awards	Best Vocal Composition in a Production	Dark Dice - "Funeral Song 1"	Won	
2020	Audio Verse Awards	Best Player Direction in a Production	Dark Dice	Won	
2020	Audio Verse Awards	Best Audio Play Production	The White Vault	Won	
2020	Audio Verse Awards	Best Instrumental Composition in a Production	The White Vault	Won	
2020	Audio Verse Awards	Best Action Sound Design in a Production	The White Vault	Won	
2020	Audio Verse Awards	Best Environment Sound Design in a Production	The White Vault	Won	
2020	Audio Verse Awards	Best New Audio Play Production	The White Vault: Iluka	Won	
2020	Audio Verse Awards	Best Instrumental Composition in a New Production	The White Vault: Iluka	Won	
2020	Audio Verse Awards	Best Action Sound Design in a New Production	The White Vault: Iluka	Won	
2020	Audio Verse Awards	Best Environment Sound Design in a New Production	The White Vault: Iluka	Won	
2020	Hear Now Audio Fiction and Arts Festival	Platinum Award	The White Vault	Won	
2020	Webby Awards	Best Original Music / Sound Design in Podcasting	The White Vault	Nominated	
2021	Audio Verse Award	Best Improvised Production	Dark Dice	Won	
2021	Audio Verse Award	Best Player Direction in a Production	Dark Dice	Won	
2021	Audio Verse Award	Best Vocal Composition in a Production	Dark Dice - "Devil's Gamble"	Won	
2021	Audio Verse Award	Best Audio Play Production	The White Vault	Won	
2021	Audio Verse Award	Best Original Compositions in an Existing Production	The White Vault	Won	
2021	Audio Verse Award	Best Music Direction for an Existing Production	The White Vault	Won	
2021	Audio Verse Award	Best Action Sound Design in an Existing Production	The White Vault	Won	
2021	Audio Verse Award	Best Environment Sound Design in an Existing Production (The White Vault)	The White Vault	Won	
2021	Audio Verse Award	Best Vocal Direction of an Existing Production	The White Vault	Won	
2021	Audio Verse Award	Best New Audio Play Production	The White Vault: Avrum	Won	
2021	Audio Verse Award	Best Action Sound Design in a New Production	The White Vault: Avrum	Won	
2021	Audio Verse Award	Best Environment Sound Design in a New Production	The White Vault: Avrum	Won	
2021	Audio Verse Award	Best Vocal Direction of a New Production	The White Vault: Avrum	Won	
2021	New Jersey Web Festival Awards	Best Sound Design in an Actual Play Production	Dark Dice	Won	
2021	Webby Award	People's Voice Award for Scripted Fiction Podcast	The White Vault	Won	
2022	Audio Verse Award	Best Improvised Production	Dark Dice	Won	
2022	Audio Verse Award	Best Player Direction in a Production	Dark Dice	Won	
2022	Audio Verse Award	Best Existing Audio Play Production	The White Vault	Won	
2022	Audio Verse Award	Best Action Sound Design for an Existing Production	The White Vault	Won	
2022	Audio Verse Award	Best Environment Sound Design for an Existing Production	The White Vault	Won	
2022	Audio Verse Award	Best Composition for an Existing Production	The White Vault - "Beneath the Ice"	Won	
2022	Audio Verse Award	Best Music Direction of an Existing Production	The White Vault	Won	
2022	Audio Verse Award	Best Vocal Direction of an Existing Production	The White Vault	Won	
2022	Miami Web Festival Awards	Best Podcast Director	Dark Dice	Won	
2022	New Jersey Web Festival Awards	Outstanding Actual Play Podcast (D&D)	Dark Dice	Won	
2022	Webby Awards	Best Individual Episode Scripted Fiction	The White Vault	Nominated	
2023	Indie Series Awards	Best Audio Fiction Series	The Boar Knight	Nominated	
2023	Indie Series Awards	Best Audio Fiction Series	Dark Dice	Nominated	
2023	Indie Series Awards	Best Audio Fiction Series	The White Vault	Nominated	
2023	Indie Series Awards	Best Original Song	The Boar Knight - "The Boar Knight Theme"	Nominated	
2023	Indie Series Awards	Best Editing	The White Vault	Nominated	
2023	Indie Series Awards	Best Audio Fiction Series	Dark Dice	Nominated	
2023	Indie Series Awards	Best Original Score	Dark Dice	Nominated	
2023	Signal Awards	Best Sound Design	Dark Dice	Won	
2023	Signal Awards	Best Sound Design (Listener's Choice)	Dark Dice	Won	
2023	Signal Awards	Most Innovative Audio Experience	Dark Dice	Won	
2023	Signal Awards	Most Innovative Audio Experience (Listener's Choice)	Dark Dice	Won	
2023	Signal Awards	Best Original Score	Dark Dice	Nominated	
2023	Signal Awards	Best Original Score (Listener's Choice)	Dark Dice	Won	
