= Let Me Tell You a Story =

Studio album by Random Encounter
- Released: September 21, 2013
- Recorded: Home Studios in Orlando, Florida, Sarasota, Florida, Clearwater, Florida, Austin, Texas, San Francisco, California, New York City, On the Beaches of Lido Key & Bird Key, On a boat in the middle of the Sarasota Bay, The Gulf of Mexico, The Pirate Festival, Kilwin's Ice Cream, The Haven, Starke Lake Studios, and at A Comic Shop
- Genre: Video game music, progressive rock
- Length: 45:20
- Label: ShinRa Electric Records
- Producer: Random Encounter (band)

Let Me Tell You a Story is the second album by American band Random Encounter released September 21, 2013. The album consists of 18 songs, contemporary rock arrangements of the music from various video game soundtracks. This represents a fan-made mix between video game covers and original songs inspired by video games. The album boasts many collaborations with artists within the video game music scene, beyond it, and even recordings made with the band's fans.

Promotion for the album was primarily based out of Random Encounter's website, Facebook, Kickstarter, and was supplemented by various tour stops around the United States during their Winter east coast mini tour, as well as regular performances in their home city Orlando, Florida, and an album release show.

== Track listing ==
1. "The Day After" – 0:50
  - originally from Final Fantasy VI
2. "Swamp Witch" – 2:39
  - an original
3. "Frog's Theme" – 1:59
  - originally from Chrono Trigger
4. "Wind Scene" – 2:20
  - originally from Chrono Trigger
5. "Not You" – 3:08
  - an original inspired by "The Legend of Zelda"
6. "Purple Angel" – 5:02
  - a parody mashup of Purple Haze and One Winged Angel
7. "Heart of Fire" – 2:05
  - originally from Castlevania
8. "Cave Story" – 2:14
  - originally from Cave Story
9. "Ocean King" – 2:47
  - an original
10. "Serpent Trench" – 1:25
  - originally from Final Fantasy VI
11. "Katamari on the Rocks" – 3:17
  - originally from Katamari Damacy
12. "Tal Tal Heights" – 1:52
  - an original inspired by "The Legend of Zelda Link's Awakening"
13. "Yoshi's Castle" – 1:59
  - originally from Yoshi's Island
14. "Still More Fighting" – 2:54
  - originally from Final Fantasy VII
15. "Death of a Friend" – 3:38
  - an original inspired by Final Fantasy IV
16. "Slam Shuffle (Zozo)" – 2:19
  - originally from Final Fantasy VI
17. "Another World" – 4:10
  - an original inspired by "Another World (video game)"
18. "Wind Waker" – 3:36
  - an original inspired by "The Legend of Zelda: The Wind Waker"
- The Physical copy of the album contains the hidden track "It Happened Late One Evening" from Secret of Mana.

The album is available for free listening and download on the Random Encounter website.

== Personnel ==
Random Encounter

- Careless – accordion, glockenspiel, vocals
- Rook – Bass guitar, vocals
- Moose – drums, Vocals
- Konami – electric guitar, acoustic steel string guitar
- Kit – electric guitar
- Michael Moore – Mixing
- Rob Kleiner – Mastering

“Guest artists”

- Dr. Wily The NESkimos – Vocals
- Phil Robertson – Drums
- Under Polaris – Chiptune
- Stemage of Metroid Metal – electric guitar
- brentalfloss – vocals
- Amanda Lepre – vocals
- Helios – piano
- Joseph Sanzo – trumpet
- Mike Trebner – sitar
- Travis Morgan – vocals
- The Random Encounter Geek Easy Chorus – vocals

== Reception ==
Let Me Tell You a Story has been given critical acclaim by Almost Nerdy, Nerdy Show, Destructoid.com. and Russian magazine Mir Fantastiki

== See also ==
- Video game music culture
