= Unavenged =

Studio album by Random Encounter
- Released: February 27, 2011
- Recorded: Science Recording Studio in, Sarasota, Florida, Nov & Dec 2010 Also recorded at Spanish Fork, Utah, Santa Clara, California, Newport News, Virginia, Chicago, IL, Tampa, Florida, Titusville, Florida, Tambov, Russia, Icheon, Republic of Korea October 2005-January 2011
- Genre: Video game music
- Length: 52:04
- Label: ShinRa Electric Records
- Producer: Careless

Unavenged is a 2011 album by Random Encounter consisting of 17 songs, contemporary rock arrangements of the music from various video game soundtracks. This represents a fan-made mix between video game covers and original songs inspired by video games. The art and theme of the album is reflective of Random Encounter’s fictional heritage as a Russian-American band of monster hunters and explains their band's hatred for their nemesis, Koschei the Deathless.

The album is Random Encounter's first, having been in existence for over five years and in its fifth incarnation. Promotion for the album was primarily based out of Random Encounter's website, Facebook, and was supplemented by various tour stops around the United States during the PvP (Player versus Performer) Summer Tour, as well as regular performances in their home city Orlando, Florida.

== Track listing ==
1. "Introduction" – 2:15
  - originally from Final Fantasy VI
2. "Terra " – 2:15
  - originally from Final Fantasy VI
3. "-72 Hours-" – 2:59
  - an original inspired by Majora’s Mask
4. "The Legend of Zelda" (Introduction, Labyrinth, Song of Storms) – 3:54
  - originally from The Legend of Zelda
5. "Gerudo Valley" – 2:24
  - originally from The Legend of Zelda
6. "Unavenged" – 3:03
  - an original
7. "Восхитительный эгоист (Vos heeteEtel'nee egoIst)" – 4:20
  - an original inspired by Diablo
8. "Vampire Killer" – 1:11
  - originally from Castlevania
9. "Big Blue" – 2:17
  - originally from F Zero
10. "Ahead on Our Way" – 2:22
  - originally from Final Fantasy V
11. "Sonic Suite" – 7:17
  - originally from Sonic The Hedgehog
12. "Boletarian Syndrome" – 2:57
  - an original inspired by Demon's Souls
13. "Clash at the Big Bridge" (Gilgamesh) – 2:16
  - originally from Final Fantasy V
14. "Still More Fighting" – 2:54
  - originally from Final Fantasy VII
15. "Millennial Faire" – 2:50
  - originally from Chrono Trigger
16. "Mother’s Brain" – 2:35
  - an original inspired by Metroid and “Final Fantasy VII”
17. "Miss You" – 3:18
  - an original
- contains hidden track "What’s Up People?"

The album is available for free listening and download on the Random Encounter website.

== Personnel ==
Random Encounter (band)

- Careless – accordion, glockenspiel, vocals
- Rook – Bass guitar, vocals
- Moose – drums, Vocals
- Konami – electric guitar, acoustic steel string guitar
- Kit – electric guitar
- Zeff Spooky – Synth-Bass
- Rob Kleiner – Mixing and Mastering

“Guest artists”

- Sir Dr. Robert Bakker (the Protomen) – acoustic steel string guitar
- Juja – electric guitar
- Auriplane – bass guitar
- Jonathan Frank – acoustic steel string guitar
- Elaine Li (Select Start) – Violin
- Helios - piano

== Reception ==
Unavenged has been given critical acclaim by The Nerdy Show, Badass Of The Week, and been nominated by Square Enix Music Online for fan arranged album of the year, 2011.

== See also ==
- Video game music culture

== External links and references ==
- Random Encounter’s homepage
- Random Encounter’s Facebook
