= Random Encounter (band) =

American video game music band

- Origin: Orlando, Florida, United States
- Genres: Video game music, progressive rock, Nintendocore
- Years active: 2005–2017 (on indefinite hiatus)
- Past members: Rook; Konami; Moose; Kit; Jackson; Careless; Helios; AdamOne; Vanek; Luck; Niko; Hiro; DemonLord; Rasputan; Destiny; Gigsley; Ven; Legolas; Lee
- Website: randomencounterband.com

Random Encounter is an independent American video game music cover/inspired band from Orlando, Florida, that features an accordion as the lead instrument. Dedicated to the creation and performance of high energy music, they are known for playing songs based on video games and for their covers of songs from popular television shows and movies.

== History ==
Random Encounter was formed from a literal series of random encounters in 2005 when two friends discovered a mutual interest in video game music. While a few incarnations of the band have existed over the years, the group most well known as Random Encounter formed in September 2010 (consisting of all new members) and transformed the band into an energetic act with the goal of being as much fun to watch as they are to listen to. Drawing from its roots as a video game cover band, Random Encounter began to create original music inspired by video game culture. These originals are strongly inspired by songs and stories from video games, often pulling from video games like Metroid, Dead Space, and the Legend of Zelda, and aim to condense the experience of a video game into a 3–4-minute song. The cover songs Random Encounter plays are arranged for a rock environment and during live performances songs are often grouped together into melodies by series. Random Encounter is also well known for their high energy and visual antics at their live shows and for their frequent use of guest musicians.

In a 2012 interview with Powet TV Random Encounter "admitted" that their musical endeavors were a cover for their affiliation with the occult-hunting branch of the Russian military. Interviews, stage banter, and their official website from 2009 to 2012 also suggested that the fictitious mission of the band, and the majority of the band's back story revolved around the elimination of paranormal creatures such as Werewolves, Vampires, Zombies, and Jerks, however the band ceased making this claim in mid-2012 after too many of their fans were confused and genuinely believed them to be from Russia.

Random Encounter has gained a fanatical following throughout the Florida nerd-music scene and throughout the east coast by becoming a part of the world's first video game themed band tour, Player Vs Performer. They have performed at venues like Nerdapalooza, MAGFest, Gencon, Otakon, SXSW, the Hard Rock Live (Orlando), led a parade of zombies, and have played in practically every major city on the east coast. Random Encounter still frequently performs throughout the Southeast United States. Notably, Random Encounter was selected as the Best Rock Act in Central Florida for 2013, the Best Indie Act in Central Florida for 2012, and the Best Folk Act in Central Florida for 2011. Badassoftheweek.com described Random Encounter as being "like all the awesomeness of playing Castlevania on the NES in Port Royale in the 17th century without all the syphilis or cutlass wounds." During the winter of 2014, Random Encounter went on a 10-day tour of Europe with Video Games Live, traveling through the UK, France, Finland, Sweden, and Spain. Later that same year Random Encounter composed music for the video game, Super Galaxy Squadron. In 2016 the band announced on their social media that it would be on an indefinite hiatus and in a 2017 radio interview they said they had no plans to perform again or release new albums after Lost Frequency.

Random Encounter has performed with such acts as They Might Be Giants, Nobuo Uematsu's band the Earthbound Papas, Less than Jake, Andrew WK, Voltaire (musician), Steam Powered Giraffe, Vivid, as a part of Video Games Live, and been a TEDxSarasota Speaker and Performer.

== Band members ==
=== Most recent lineup ===
The band members of Random Encounter prefer not to go by their real names, and instead have adopted nicknames based on their online gamer tags.

- Rook – bass guitar, vocals
- Konami – guitar, vocals
- Moose – Drums
- Kit – guitar
- Jackson – accordion, tuba, keyboard

=== Previous members ===
- Careless – accordion, vocals, Glockenspiel
- Helios – keyboard
- AdamOne – drums
- Luck – guitar
- Vanek – euphonium
- Gigsley – guitar
- Niko – guitar
- Destiny – guitar
- Hiro – trumpet
- DemonLord – guitar
- Rasputan – guitar
- Ven – bass guitar
- Legolas – drum machine

Random Encounter has also performed with (live):

- brentalfloss – vocals
- Juja – guitar
- Under Polaris – bass guitar
- Select Start (the full band)
- Lauren "The Flute" Liebowitz – flute
- The Descendants of Erdrick (the full band in 2012)
- Dr. Wily of The NESkimos – vocals
- Steffeny "Steffo" Messinger – vocals
- MC Wreckshin – vocals
- Video Games Live – (Orchestra)
- Tommy Tallarico – guitar
- Craig Turley Orchestra – (Orchestra)
- Santaluces Choir – (Choir)
- Stetson Orchestra – (Orchestra)
- Gerard Marino – guitar
- The Sexy Sax Man – saxophone
- Richard DeGrey – drums
- Professor Shyguy – drums
- Stemage of Metroid Metal – guitar
- Hungarian Virtuosi Orchestra – (Orchestra)
- Riva Taylor – Vocals
- Vantaan Viihdeorkesteri Orchestra – (Orchestra)
- Stockholm Concert Orchestra – (Orchestra)
- Orquesta Nacional de España – (Orchestra)

== Discography ==
- Neo Symbiance (EP) – ShinRa Electric Records (2006)
- Random Encounter (Self Titled) (Demo LP) – ShinRa Electric Records (2010)
- Unavenged – ShinRa Electric Records (2011)
- 72 Hours in The Ocean with your Mother (Single) – ShinRa Electric Records (2012)
- Dead Labs (Single) – ShinRa Electric Records (2013)
- Let Me Tell You a Story – ShinRa Electric Records (2013)
- The Big Blue LP (LP) – ShinRa Electric Records (2014)
- Super Galaxy Squadron original Soundtrack – ShinRa Electric Records (2015)
- Lost Frequency – ShinRa Electric Records (2017)

== See also ==
- Video game music culture
