= The White Vault =

Found footage horror podcast

- Logo of the series for the first five seasons
- Running time: 19–37 min
- Country of origin: Germany
- Language: English
- Starring: Lani Minella; David Ault; Eyþór Viðarsson; Kessi Riliniki; Peter Joseph Lewis (Note: Depending on the sources, Lewis is either credited under his full name or simply as "Peter Lewis".); Hem Brewster (Note: Credited by her maiden name of Hem Cleveland prior to season 7.); Carla García; Eric Nelsen; Sophie Yang; Alli Smalley; Danilo Battistini; Diane Casanova; L. Jeffrey Moore; Haytham Alwan; Tanja Milojevic; Beth Eyre; Karin Heimdahl; Ewan Chung; Charlotte Norup; Lauren Tucker; Hildur Magnusdottir; Marcy Edwards; Denise Halfyard; Michael DelGaudio; Shion Francois; Kristján Atli Heimisson; Hinako Matsumoto; Daisuke Tsuji; Sam Yeow; Luis Cruz
- Created by: K. A. Statz; Travis Vengroff (Note: Statz is credited as creator, and Vengroff as co-creator.)
- Written by: K. A. Statz
- Directed by: Travis Vengroff
- Produced by: Travis Vengroff
- Executive producers: Bobby Fatemi (season 4); Dennis Greenhill (season 5–6); AJ Punk'n (season 5–6); Maico Villegas (season 5–6); Carol Vengroff (season 6)
- Narrated by: Hem Brewster (season 1–5)
- Original release: October 3, 2017 – March 10, 2026
- No. of series: 6
- No. of episodes: 80
- Opening theme: "Unsealed" by Brandon Boone (season 1–2) "Base Camp Piedra" by Brandon Boone (season 3–4) "Beneath the Ice" by Brandon Boone (season 5) "Goshawk (Main Theme)" by Dayn Leonardson (season 6-8)
- Ending theme: "Unsealed" by Brandon Boone (season 1–5) various tracks by Dayn Leonardson (season 6-8)
- Website: Official website
- Podcast: iTunes Store

The White Vault is a horror fiction podcast created by K.A. Statz and Travis Vengroff. It is written by Statz, directed, produced, edited and sound designed by Travis Vengroff, and released by the two's Fool and Scholar Productions company. Ongoing since October 3, 2017, it is made available on Apple Podcasts, Pandora, and Spotify on release, and later on YouTube.

The series originally uses the found footage format and follows a group of individuals sent to the Norwegian archipelago of Svalbard to investigate a remote outpost gone radio silent after sending a distress signal. In addition to the main show, Fool and Scholar Productions released several canonical miniseries, some of which introduce elements and characters later featured or mentioned in the main show, such as 2018's Artifact, 2019's Imperial, 2020's Iluka, and 2021's Avrum; Echoes, released in 2023, is a standalone sequel set a decade after The White Vault. Although the main show concluded its original run with the conclusion of its fifth season on March 15, 2022, it was revived as The White Vault: Goshawk, with a sixth season which premiered on October 24, 2023, set in the same universe but following new characters and dropping the found footage format. The series concluded on March 10th, 2026.

The award-winning show features an international cast and crew, with notable members including David Ault and Peter Joseph Lewis of The NoSleep Podcast, Beth Eyre of Wooden Overcoats, Lani Minella, and Eric Nelsen.

== Production ==
Statz stated in 2020: "I wanted [The White Vault] to be a horror story for people who are always agitated when they watch a movie and are like, 'That's stupid, why did you do that?' [Our characters] aren't making bad choices. It's that every choice has no good option." She also claimed to have been inspired for the first season by her time at the University of Oxford, where "Everyone had their own stories about how they got to that exact same place."

Vengroff contacted Polar Bears International in order to obtain actual polar bear audio clips for the podcasts, rather than use grizzly bear audio clips as substitute as is often done in the entertainment industry. He similarly sought authentic Andean condor audio clips for another episode.

For the Imperial spin-off, Statz and Vengroff worked with Stephen Wadley, an associate professor of Chinese and international studies at Portland State, to accurately depict Chinese and Manchu languages.

== Story and characters ==
The first five seasons of The White Vault are presented in a found footage format by a character known only as The Documentarian (Hem Brewster), a British woman who gathered audio, video, and written material of the depicted events. The Documentarian has compiled the footage in order to recreate the roughly chronological order of the events; she describes visual elements, while written material is depicted as being spoken by the character who wrote it. The final episode of Season 5 and the entire Goshawk story arc features no narration or character describing visual elements, instead directly following the characters. When a character speaks or writes in a non-English language, the voice actor performs an English version played louder over the original language.

=== Seasons 1–2 ===
The first two seasons of The White Vault take place in Outpost Fristed, a remote Arctic research station in Svalbard, a Norwegian archipelago in the Arctic Ocean, from which a signal starts emitting, something only meant in case of emergencies; the crew, who was in charge of surveying weather and seismic activities for the safety of the locals, has made no contact since. Several weeks later, a rescue team of five is sent by Sidja Grúp, the Scandinavian company owning the station, consisting of: Mexican physician Dr. Rosa De La Torre (Lani Minella), sent in case of medical help needed, English technology specialist Walter Heath (David Ault), tasked with inspecting and possibly repairing the station's transmitter, Icelandic Sidja Grúp representative Jónas Þórirsson (Eyþór Viðarsson), sent to document the events for the company, German geologist Dr. Karina Schumacher-Weiß (Kessi Riliniki), hired to examine the outpost's data, and Russian-Canadian survival expert Graham Casner (Peter Joseph Lewis), tasked with the group's safety against the Arctic cold and other potential dangers. The team arrives safely, finding the station deserted but in good shape overall, being fairly easy to fix for Heath; a heavy blizzard follows and fails to subside, making it impossible to leave for the foreseeable future.

Exploring more of the station, the crew finds a hatch leading to a cave system containing an ancient village trapped underneath a glacier, where Schumacher-Weiß, after encountering a "tall, black and skinny" creature, jumps from a ledge to save herself; although she only suffers limited physical damage, she grows increasingly mentally unstable. More strange events follow: the generator is sabotaged, Karina reports doppelgänger sightings, five-fingered scratches appear on the exterior of the bunker, statues within the village representing human-like or animal-like creatures begin to inexplicably disappear and reappear when out of sight, and the anatomical theatre the team found in the village turns out to be made of stone boxes each containing a human heart and a full set of teeth. A paranoid Schumacher-Weiß is eventually abducted in the middle of the night, and the team finds a new box with a still beating heart, which they believe to be hers; they also hear her outside the bunker asking them to open the door, but conclude that the being who took her is using her voice. With their food supplies sabotaged by the creature, the team tries to escape through the blizzard; their attempted escape ends in disaster as Heath is also taken by the creature, while the three remaining team members find themselves inexplicably back to Outpost Fristed. Out of options, they explore the cave system in an attempt to find a way out; however, the creatures, which the team realizes are more than a single entity, chase them, and both Casner and De La Torre are taken. Þórirsson, the sole survivor, leaves a final written note in which he reveals that his body had been changing, and that he was spared by the creatures because he is turning into one of them.

=== Season 3 ===
The third season is set shortly after the first two, on the Cerro Torre mountain in the Patagonian Andes, where an archaeological site of unknown origins featuring petroglyphs was recently discovered. As the site on Cerro Torre, named Base Camp Piedra, belongs to both Argentina and Chile, an international archaeological team of six is sent to study, consisting of: Argentinian archaeology professor Dr. Carito Ureta (Alli Smalley) of the National University of La Plata, her Colombian-American student and doctoral candidate Eva Olivia Moreno (Diane Casanova), Chilean archaeology professor Dr. Josefa Guerrero (Carla García) of Chile's University of Chile and United States' University of Pittsburgh, her American assistant and graduate student Simon Hall (Eric Nelsen), Chinese epigrapher Dr. Zhou Liu (Note: Originally introduced in the miniseries The White Vault: Imperial.) (Sophie Yang), included due to having previously investigated similar glyphs in the Greater Khingan, and the Brazilian field guide who led the tourist group that coincidentally discovered the site, Lucas Criado (Danilo Battistini), now acting as helicopter pilot for the team's ascension and eventual descent of Cerro Torre.

The archaeological team starts their work studying the petroglyphs on the mountain's cliff face, until Moreno discovers a cave containing statues, an anatomical theatre with a floor made of stone boxes, and evidence of early human occupation. While the group's excitement grows, this also marks the start of inexplicable events, such as the statues being moved while no one is present, doppelgänger sightings, and both Ureta and Criado losing their grips on sanity; the latter acts increasingly suspicious, refusing to take the team down the mountain, leading the others to conclude that he knew what they would find at the site. Dense fog, and later heavy snowfalls plague the mountain, and both Ureta and the team's satellite phone go missing. An insane Criado severely injures Hall's ankle, Liu concludes that everything at the site is inexplicably similar to that of the Greater Khingan's, and Hall is attacked by a monster using Ureta's voice, barely surviving the encounter. A rockfall traps Guerrero, Hall and Liu within the cave, so Moreno is forced to descend the mountain by herself, miraculously achieving the descent despite noticing the presence of the monsters around her.

The season finale switches perspective to focus on Casner, who is revealed to have survived the events of Outpost Fristed. The Documentarian, who has placed both he and Moreno under her care, wishes to send a team led by Casner to Base Camp Piedra, in the hopes of rescuing the archaeological team and acquire more information on the site and the similarities between the events they encountered and those of Outpost Fristed and the Greater Khingan. A reluctant Casner accepts the offer after discovering that a dead body found by the archaeological team was De La Torre's. The rescue team assembles, consisting of Casner, his old Serbian friend and fellow survival expert Dragana Vuković (Tanja Milojevic), (Note: Milojevic first appeared as an unrelated character, Marion Sutton, in The White Vault: Artifact.) The Documentarian's trusted Lebanese associate Maheer Issa (Haytham Alwan), and a returning Moreno, injured but determined to help; upon arriving in Patagonia, they are joined by Hall's American boyfriend Raimy Armstead (L. Jeffrey Moore), looking for Hall after losing contact with him, and start climbing up Cerro Torre.

=== Season 4 ===
The rescue team arrives at Base Camp Piedra, where they receive a radio call for help from a seemingly alive Liu. A controlled explosion by Vuković creates an opening into the cave, and they find Hall, alive but with his ankle injury significantly worsened, who explains that both Guerrero and Liu ended up stuck together with one of the creatures in a deeper part of the cave. The cave is also a dead end, with a stone door that can only be opened from the outside, leaving Hall safe but stuck in the shallower part of the cave, too weakened to free the others. Casner, Vuković and Issa open the door and go through, finding both Liu and Guerrero; however, when the latter informs them that Liu was taken by the creature stuck with them, the "Liu" met by the rescue team, revealed to be a monster having taken her form, abducts and kills Issa.

Casner, Guerrero, Hall, Moreno, Vuković and Armstead conclude that they are the only survivors among both the archaeological team and the rescue team, and make plans to climb down the mountain, a hazardous solution due to both the unusual weather making the ascension easy but the descend arduous, as if on purpose, and Hall's worsening injury. Casner finds De La Torre's body, which crumbles to dust when he makes physical contact, leaving nothing but teeth, which Casner collects, and a dust-like substance. Moreno, who realizes that she is turning into one of the creatures (likely the reason why she was not attacked during her earlier descent of the mountain), detonates explosives while the others undergo their escape, killing herself, destroying the site and buying them time. The five survivors make it to the bottom of Cerro Torre and reach a hospital, where Hall's leg his amputated due to his injury in order to save his life.

A key subplot in the series is The Documentarian's own journey as she discovers that her estranged mother, referred to as "Mor" (Karin Heimdahl; Swedish for "mother"), the owner of a powerful company, is tied to the events featured in the series. The storyline becomes more prominent as the Documentarian travels to Sweden to meet with Mor, whom, after the death of her other daughter, Essie (The Documentarian's half-sister), makes contact and explains many of the secrets behind the events of the series, as she wants her daughter to work with her. Mor reveals that the creatures are known as the Guardians, or Forrmynður. She explains that their family has known of the Guardians for countless years, and is directly responsible for, and influenced by, elusive rituals: she explains that the rituals, made to satisfy the Guardians, result in global catastrophes if not followed, and that, while family members who follow the rituals are gifted with impossible luck and health, those who do not can suffer accidents, such as the car crash in which Mor's other daughter died. The rituals are closely linked to the deadly events previously investigated by The Documentarian: Mor notably reveals that Sidja Grúp is a "sister company" to her own owned by Jónas Þórirsson's widow Hulda Rúnasdóttir (Sara Fridgeirsdóttir), whom Mor admits knowingly sent her husband to his doom, and that the shadow group Mor is a part of is behind the events of Outpost Fristed, Cerro Torre, and Greater Khingan, as well as many others. She implies that recent natural disasters all over the world are linked to a "Vault" at Outpost Fristed, and that the disasters will worsen unless the Vault is "satisfied" with the return of "the one it lost", implied to be Casner.

While undergoing her investigation in Sweden, The Documentarian learns of the recent events at Base Camp Piedra and makes contact with Casner's team. Although she does not yet fully understand the situation, she concludes that Outpost Fristed is the key to stopping the disasters happening worldwide, and wants to send Casner there; Vuković also decides to come out of faithfulness for Casner, as does Guerrero out of archaeological interest; they part ways with Hall and Armstead, who return home.

=== Season 5 ===
The Documentarian continues her investigation into Mor's activities and the conspiracy related to the Guardians: she learns that the origins of the Guardians are unknown, but that they are humans or animals who turned into Guardians later on; they demand regular sacrifices, and if their demands or not met, natural disasters follow with many casualties. It's explained that the members of Mor's family have never been attacked by the Guardians nor afflicted by the loss of sanity often caused by the Guardians or their artifacts, although this trait is only passed from women to their biological children. With the death of Mor's other daughter, she reunited with The Documentarian to make her the heir to the family's legacy.

Meanwhile, Casner and Guerrero, who are attempting to reach Outpost Fristed with Vuković, both confess to their sanity worsening, suffering frequent visual and auditory hallucinations. The worsening natural disasters make travel near-impossible, but they are eventually able to reach Ny-Ålesund in Svalbard after being joined by Dr. Amelia Murray (Note: Originally introduced in the miniseries The White Vault: Iluka.) (Beth Eyre), an English oceanographer working in Svalbard for Sidja Grúp, and who seems inexplicably immune to the loss of sanity caused by the Guardians' natural forms and artifacts. In Ny-Ålesund, the team discovers the town slaughtered by monsters and filled with insane, murderous individuals, and takes refuge with the last group of sane survivors, including a Chinese scientist (Ewan Chung) and a Danish nurse (Charlotte Norup), with the former injuring Murray before realizing that Casner's group is not hostile.

A devastated Documentarian makes contact with Casner; having learned that the only way to stop the global catastrophes was to sacrifice Casner to the Svalbard site, she reluctantly lies, tricking him into heading into the Vault so he can be killed. Casner, Guerrero, and Vuković use snowmobiles to reach Outpost Fristed, while the injured Murray stays behind. Murray places a phone call to an unidentified person called Valco, and laments that she was prevented from accompanying the group to Fristed, and also she was unable to "place the object" on Casner. Later, Þórirsson, now a full Guardian, peacefully invites Murray to leave the shelter behind and come with him. He claims that he intends to neither harm Murray nor turn her into a Guardian, and destroys an artifact in Murray's possession that had actually been sent by Sidja Grúp in an attempt to kill her, (Note: As depicted in The White Vault: Iluka.) revealing that the Guardians take part in the sacrifices in an effort to appease an even greater force. Murray accepts the Guardian's invitation to leave everything behind and follow him to an unknown location for more answers.

The trio led by Casner reaches Outpost Fristed, but Guerrero, who has lost more of her sanity by this point, calls upon the creatures and is taken by them. Casner and Vuković rush to the cave system to save her, but are too late; a Guardian, taking on the form of Dr. Rosa De La Torre, says Casner needs to come with them. A furious Vuković fires at it, but the Guardian throws her away and drags Casner into the Vault to sacrifice him, ending the ritual started at the beginning of season 1 and closing the caverns. The worldwide catastrophes come to an end, and Vuković and the Ny-Ålesund survivors are safely rescued.

An unspecified amount of time later, The Documentarian moves to Sweden to be with her mother, and meets with a furious Vuković. The Documentarian apologizes and gives her the video Casner left for Vuković; in it, Casner, convinced he will not survive his return to Outpost Fristed, thanks Vuković and asks her to look after his young daughter and, in a few years, deliver a message he recorded for her. Vuković eventually agrees to work for The Documentarian after learning that, while agreeing to work with her mother and having sacrificed Casner due to the urgency of the situation, she plans to find a way to end the cycle of rituals and sacrifices. Mor shares a meal with Hulda; while Hulda is shocked to see the remains of Murray's artifact, having believed the artifacts to be unbreakable. Hulda dismisses further talks about Murray, convinced that she is dead, although Mor is more skeptical, pointing out that remains were never found.

Having recovered all of the available footage related to the events at Outpost Fristed, Base Camp Piedra, and her own investigations into her family, The Documentarian, whose name is revealed to be Linnea, starts recording a presentation, in case she later fails to break the cycle and the burden falls onto her next of kin; this leads to the opening words of the series' first episode, revealing that The Documentarian's presentation was addressed to her future child. The final episode's post-credits scene features Hall and Armstead, about to get married, as they receive a package with carving akin to that of the sites'. They return it to sender to avoid any danger, and Armstead accepts a job at Mor and Linnea's company.

=== Goshawk (Seasons 6-8) ===
Set thirteen years after the conclusion of the previous season, Goshawk follows two storylines. The first takes place in North Maine Woods, United States, in the middle of a snow storm. Two wild life documentalists, Jean Pelletier-Clarke (A.R. Olivieri) and Irina "Iffy" Talno (Lauren Tucker) encounter Canadian cousins and adoptive sisters Adele (Marcy Edwards) and Mika Fathers Tsįą (Denise Halfyard), who were kidnapped from their home in the Northwest Territories as bargaining chips in a land dispute between their family and a corporation, and are currently on the run from their two abductors, Sam "Es" Gallo (Dayn Leonardson) and Lewis Moulin (Michael DelGaudio). Jean is captured and killed by Es, while Iffy and the sisters flee to Goshawk, a nearby ghost town and former mining town to escape the abductors.

The sole person in Goshawk is Jason Uchida (Shion Francois), (Note: First introduced in The White Vault: Echoes.) a researcher who welcomes and helps the women. Later, a panicked Lewis arrives in Goshawk and is taken prisoner by the others, claiming that Es was taken away by a beast in the woods. As strange occurrences multiply, Jason, who turns out to have killed his companions (later revealed to be graduate students from the University of Maine) and plans on sacrificing the new arrivals to the entity he serves, kills Mika by drugging her and throwing her into the nearby lake, and later similarly kills himself at the request of the Guardians present in Goshawk.

Iffy finds a satellite phone, and, after her attempts at calling emergency services fail, switches to a special emergency contact of hers: Dragana Vuković, whose response reveals that Iffy is Casner's daughter. While Iffy is away from the town, a creature impersonating Iffy infiltrates the building holding Adele and Lewis, killing the latter. Vuković, who has continued to deal with Guardian sites for thirteen years, arrives in Goshawk with her trusted friend Kidlat Tolentino (Luis Cruz), and they plan an escape to a safer location within the mines. Dragana reveals that working on the sites has begun to affect her sanity, with a mysterious voice hinting that Iffy's mother is a member of one of the families that works with the sites. Soon after, the voice reveals itself to be Amelia Murray, who is no longer human, commands the Guardians, and orders one to take Iffy prisoner. Adele and Kidlat escape, after which Vuković rescues Iffy and gives her a chance to escape but is stabbed.

The second storyline of Goshawk follows a woman named Dís Eldrúnsdóttir (Hildur Magnusdottir), who is a member of the Icelandic family running Sidja Grúp. The family has come to face various incidents and concludes that their protective powers are wavering, noting strange readings at areas that are not known sites, as well as people sent to survey them going missing. A mysterious and possibly dangerous artifact of mysterious origins also makes its way to Dís's home, implying that they are under attack by someone. (Note: As depicted in The White Vault: Echoes.) Dís, who has always kept distant with her family's supernatural affairs, decides to get involved to protect her family from harm, and travels with her cousin Tryggvi Rúnuson (Kristján Atli Heimisson) to a meeting of the various families from around the world (who also manage sacrificial sites like those in Svalbard), in Cairo, Egypt.

At the meeting, Dís meets prominent members of branches of the family from all over the world, including the Swedish Linnea Wällsigna ("The Documentarian" from seasons 1-5), the Japanese Miho (Note: First introduced, unnamed, in The White Vault: Echoes.) (Hinako Matsumoto) and Kōsuke Iwai (Daisuke Tsuji), and the de facto meeting head Bǎo Ruì-Gāo (Sam Yeow) from China. The tense meetings show signs of promise as Dís and others seek to overlook rivalries and politics to work together, but Linnea is poisoned after revealing key information intended to unite the families. Still alive, she sends emails containing new developments within victims of site-induced insanity and newly forming sites. The danger significantly escalates as a Guardian starts hunting and slaughtering all present. Linnea again attempts to rally the family members, but the Brazilian family representatives from Sina-Bene are revealed to be traitors and attack, killing Linnea, Miho, and Trygvvi before being killed in self-defense. Bǎo is taken by the Guardian, leaving Dís and Kōsuke as the survivors from the meeting. Armed with Linnea's notes, the two make their way to Goshawk, having been made aware of the recent events involving Jason and Vuković.

Dís and Kōsuke ultimately reach Goshawk and meet up with Iffy, Vuković, Adele, and Tolentino in the old tunnels. They release the artifacts they brought from Cairo to fight the new faction while Vuković blows up Murray. In the chaos, Dís sacrifices herself to save Adele from a rockfall and is killed. Adele gets home safely, Vuković survives, and Kōsuke turns into a guardian. A series of site-influenced natural disasters around the world kill thousands of people. The surviving families have lost the luck, and are working together to kill the thing beyond the vault doors through global warming. If it dies, the parasitic guardians will also perish and the cycles will finally end. In a final flashback, Iffy and Vuković agree to retire and travel somewhere warm.

== Cast ==
=== Main cast ===
The series does not categorize its performers; actors are listed below as main cast if they appear in more than half of a season's episodes, and as recurring cast if they appear in less than half of a season's episodes or guest cast if they only appear in a single episode.

Actor	Character	Appearances							
Actor	Character	1	2	3	4	5	6	7	8
Lani Minella	Dr. Rosa De La Torre	Main	Main		Guest	Recurring			
David Ault	Walter Heath	Main	Main		Guest	Recurring			
Eyþór Viðarsson	Jónas Þórirsson (Note: In the season 5 episode "Homecoming", Viðarsson is credited as portraying a Forrmynður, which is hinted to as being a transformed Jónas Þórirsson.)	Main	Main			Recurring			
Kessi Riliniki	Dr. Karina Schumacher-Weiß	Main	Recurring		Recurring	Recurring			
Peter Joseph Lewis	Graham Casner	Main	Main	Recurring	Main	Main			Recurring
Hem Brewster	The Documentarian / Linnea Wällsigna	Main	Main	Main	Main	Main		Recurring	Guest
Carla García	Dr. Josefa Guerrero			Main	Main	Main			
Eric Nelsen	Simon Hall			Main	Main	Guest (Note: Uncredited appearance in Episode 10.)			
Sophie Yang	Dr. Zhou Liu (Note: First introduced in The White Vault: Imperial.)			Main	Main	Guest			
Alli Smalley	Dr. Carito Ureta			Main	Recurring				
Danilo Battistini	Lucas Criado			Main	Guest (Note: Uncredited appearance in Episode 3.)				
Diane Casanova	Eva Olivia Moreno			Main	Main	Guest			
L. Jeffrey Moore	Raimy Armstead			Guest	Main	Guest			
Haytham Alwan	Maheer Issa			Guest	Main				
Tanja Milojevic	Dragana Vuković			Guest	Main	Main	Guest	Main	Main
Beth Eyre	Dr. Amelia Murray (Note: First introduced in The White Vault: Iluka.) (Note: Played an uncredited voice in Seasons 6 and 7 that first appeared in The White Vault: Echoes (played there by Kaitlin Statz) before being credited starting in Season 7, Episode 17.)					Main	Recurring	Recurring	Recurring
Karin Heimdahl	Mor / Agneta				Recurring	Main			
Ewan Chung	Dr. Carter Duàn					Main			
Charlotte Norup (Note: Norup also played an unnamed Danish woman in an episode of Season 1 and Season 4.)	Nadine Teuling					Main			
Lauren Tucker	Irina "Iffy" Talno						Main	Main	Main
Hildur Magnusdottir	Dís Eldrúnsdóttir						Main	Main	Main
Marcy Edwards	Adele Fathers Tsįą						Main	Main	Main
Denise Halfyard	Mika Fathers Tsįą						Main	Guest	Recurring
Michael DelGaudio	Lewis Moulin						Main	Recurring	
Shion Francois	Jason Uchida						Main	Main	
Kristján Atli Heimisson	Tryggvi Rúnuson						Main	Main	Recurring
Hinako Matsumoto	Miho Iwai (Note: First introduced in The White Vault: Echoes as an unidentified professional.)							Main	
Daisuke Tsuji	Kōsuke Iwai							Main	Main
Sam Yeow	Bǎo Ruì-Gāo							Main	
Luis Cruz	Kidlat Tolentino							Main	Main

=== Recurring cast members ===
- Esa Andersson as the Finnish soldier (season 2), an unnamed man who seemingly stayed at Outpost Fristed prior to the events of the series.
- Alma Ottedag as Ebba (season 4–5), Mor's assistant
- Daniel Muñoz as various characters (season 4–5)
- Travis Vengroff as various characters (season 4–7)
- Stephanie Izsak as Kelly (season 5), a member of the Canadian Arctic Zone Science Organization who is acquaintances with Graham Casner.
- Lauren Choo as Lisa Mǎ (season 5), a Chinese tour organizer and one of the survivors in Ny-Ålesund.
- Lauren Clare as Lorri Warner (season 5), a British satellite technician and one of the survivors in Ny-Ålesund.
- Sam Suksiri as Paul Green (season 5), an American man working at the weather station in Ny-Ålesund and one of the survivors.
- Roland Olsen as Nils-Henrik (season 5), one of the site caretakers of the Swedish site.
- Albin Weidenbladh as Vidar Henriksson (season 5-6), the site caretaker of the Swedish site, and a distant relative of the Icelandic family.
- Sara Fridgeirsdóttir as Hulda Rúnasdóttir (season 5–8), the head of the Icelandic family and Sidja Group, and Jónas' wife.
- Robert Neumayr as Matteo (5-8), Hulda Rúnasdóttir's second husband, and a member of the Austrian family.
- A.R. Olivieri (season 6) and Mike Cuellar (season 7) as Jean Pelletier-Clarke (season 6-7), a wildlife photographer who is partners with Iffy.
- Dayn Leonardson as Sam ‘Es’ Gallo (season 6-8), one of the men who kidnapped Adele and Mika.
- Melkorka Oskarsdottir as Þóra Rúnasdóttir (season 6), Dís' cousin and a member of the Icelandic family.
- Hrafnhildur Orradóttir as Arna Dísdottír (season 6-8), Dís' eldest daughter and a member of the Icelandic family.
- EJ Lavery as Eloise Kavberg (season 7), a member of one of the Canadian families in attendance at the Heritage Conference in Cairo.
- Kanglha as Tashi Wangmo (season 7), a member of the Bhutanese family in attendance at the Heritage Conference in Cairo.
- Viktoria Jimsheleishvili as Tamar Guledani (season 7), a member the Georgian family in attendance at the Heritage Conference in Cairo.
- Sabine Novaković-Wagner as Franziska Fordaro (season 7), a member of the Austrian family at the Heritage Conference in Cairo.
- Roxxy Sant'Anna and Helyson Sales as Italo and Marcio Serafim (season 7), two members of the Brazilian family in attendance at the Heritage Conference in Cairo.
- Nastasya Sokolova as Alyona Zima (season 7), a member of one of the Russian families in attendance at the Heritage Conference in Cairo.

=== The White Vault: Artifact ===
- Tanja Milojevic as Marion Sutton, a doctoral student at Oxford University assigned with studying a mysterious artifact from an anonymous benefactor.
- Heather Mclellan as Lucca Kovacs, a friend of Marion's and a fellow student who does detailed archeological illustrations.
- Matthew McLean as Davis, a fellow student of Marion's who does archeological photographs.
- Rob Harrison as Alex, a friend of Marion's and a fellow student who does testing on archeological pieces.

=== The White Vault: Imperial ===
- Andrea Galata as Brother Benedetto Herbardian, an Italian Jesuit cartographer who assists Father Martim Vaaz in creating a map of China.
- Jd'almeida Pinheiro as Father Martim Vaaz, a Portuguese Jesuit cartographer tasked with creating a map of China.
- Ewan Chung as Official Jingwei Chen, a Chinese official assigned to watch over the Jesuits.

=== The White Vault: Iluka ===
- Dagur Jóhannesson as Mr. Árni Einarson, a professional man reporting findings from the collected documents found on the R/V Iluka with Dr. Amelia Murray.
- Daniel Muñoz as Dr. Oscar Flores, a chemical oceanographer working aboard the R/V Iluka with Dr. Murray.
- Dallas Wheatley as Charlie Lord, a deckhand aboard the R/V Iluka who often works with Dr. Murray and Dr. Flores.
- Angus Brennan as Franco Reed, a lab technician aboard the R/V Illuka who works with Dr. Murray and Dr. Flores.
- Sam Yeow as Alex Lái, the R/V Iluka's crane technician who often works with Dr. Murray and Dr. Flores.
- Daniel Bunton as Captain Stephen Reimann, the captain of the R/V Iluka.

=== The White Vault: Avrum ===
- Yelena Shmulenson as Avrum ben Judah, a Ukrainian Jewish teen forced to flee his home in the midst of the 1648 Cossack Uprising.
- Lika Khukhashvili as Rivka, a young Georgian girl traveling with her family through Ukraine who happens upon Avrum.
- Shota Svanidze as Zelig, Rivka's father and the unpopular leader of the traveling group.
- Sandro Berdzenishvili as Usher, a member of Rivka's family and part of the traveling group.
- Erebusodora as Lada Rachman, a Ukrainian Jewish woman who obtained Avrum's journal.

=== The White Vault: Echoes ===
- Andreas Somville as Thomas Burg, a Dutch businessman inspecting a property owned by the Matsuoka family near Beppu, Japan.
- Alpha Takahashi as Ikumi Matsuoka, a Japanese woman working for her grandfather who owns the property Thomas is inspecting.
- Marcha Kia as Mari Hagi, a close friend of Matsuoka's that accompanies her, Thomas, and Jason.

=== Spin-offs ===
==== The White Vault: Artifact ====
Marion Sutton, doctoral student at the University of Oxford, is assigned to begin research on a mysterious artifact gifted to the university by an anonymous donor. As her time with the object progresses, she begins to experience strange events and hear whispers. As her and her associates attempt to date, photograph, and research the object, the artifact seems to change expression, growing more angry as the study continues. Nightmares begin to cripple Marion. Luca, an artist tasked with drawing the artifact, is found dead by her own hand after an extended period with the artifact. Marion is believed to have walked into the ocean, driven mad by the object and how it calls to her.

==== The White Vault: Imperial ====
In the early 1700s, a Jesuit cartographic team reaches the lands of China, and sets about plans to complete a map of Qing dynasty China. The story is told through the recovered pages of journals and writings, with each passage read in the original languages (Italian, Portuguese, Mandarin, Manchu) before shifting to English.

==== The White Vault: Iluka ====
Dr Amelia Murray sits down with a representative of Sidja Grúp to review recordings and documents of the events that took place on board the shifting oceanic research vessel Iluka.

The Iluka, working in the Southern Ocean to collect deep-sea sediment cores and water samples using a vibrocorer, unexpectedly pulls up a large stone statue from the sea floor, tangled up in the equipment. The team work to remove the statue from the vibrocorer's legs, noting that it resembles a crab, or some kind of crustacean, and inform the captain they will have to remain stationary until the statue is untangled.

As they attempt to repair the vibrocorer, strange events begin to take place on board the Iluka: a dead whale floats to the surface of the sea, and nothing comes to scavenge from it; the statue moves around the ship's deck, disappearing and reappearing, while the deck cameras malfunction; the statue is unaffected by use of a scratch kit, and is deemed unidentifiable in material composition.

Two of the crew, Dr Oscar Flores and Franco Reid, are cut by the statue after touching it, with Franco falling seriously ill in a short space of time. In personal recordings, Franco complains that he is unable to eat anything, feels like his skin is crawling, and cannot get warm. The next day, Franco, working in the laboratory, is found running boiling water over his skin and scratching it, resulting in his skin debriding and revealing dark, shiny flesh underneath. The team attempt to subdue him, and trick him into being locked in the kitchen's walk-in freezer; despite his temperature registering at 41 °C (106 °F) and above, he continues to complain that he is cold. A curtailed medical report details that in the walk to the freezer, a number of Franco's teeth fell out; Dr Murray details that "everything that was Franco was falling away", and that the medical officer had no explanation for Franco's condition. In a recording of Franco taken from outside the freezer, the audible breaking of his bones can be heard as he moans in pain.

As Franco's condition continues to deteriorate, Dr Murray returns to the deck to discover that released deep-sea gasses are causing the sea to bubble, and that a number of petrels are falling out of the sky, dead. The crew talk to the captain, who decides to head back to port due to Franco's death.

Upon returning to the kitchen, the crew discover that Franco has escaped. Dr Flores, whose own injury from the statue is developing in the same way as Franco's condition did, tells Dr Murray that he has decided to go out on his own terms, and jumps overboard to avoid the same fate. The crew discover the captain is dead, and that the creature who used to be Franco was the likely culprit; the corpse of the ship's medical officer is also found.

Planning their escape, the crew pile into lifeboats, with the crane technician Alex staying behind to ensure everyone gets off the ship. Dr Murray hears Alex being killed by the creature, and is unable to convince the crew to turn around and go back for her. Follow-up documents note that the crew was rescued by a number of ships that were in the area at the time. The Iluka was recaptured, refueled and towed back to port, with blood on the ship identified as that of the known dead.

The representative of Sidja Grúp informs Dr Murray that he has no questions about her actions on board the Iluka, and formally invites her to take the position of head geological oceanographer at Sidja Grúp. Dr Murray questions why none of the reviewed recordings and documents raised any concerns about her actions, and ascertains that none of the events that took place – the deaths, the statues, what happened to Franco – are new to Sidja's representative. Dr Murray turns down the position and moves to leave; however, Sidja Grúp's representative offers to provide her with information, means and staff familiar with events similar to those of the Iluka, leading Dr Murray to take the job, at Sidja Grúp's more Northern offices.

==== The White Vault: Avrum ====
Amid the terror of the 1648 Cossack Uprising, and following the destruction of his home, Avrum is rescued by a group of travelers, befriending a young girl, Rivka.

==== The White Vault: Echoes ====
Taking place a decade after the end of the fifth season, a businessman named Thomas Burg goes to Beppu, Japan to investigate a property owned by Ikumi Matsuoka's family.

=== Bonus episodes ===
- The White Vault: Summit – A young couple living in Rio de Janeiro get a call from work, informing them that they have won an all expenses paid hiking trip to Patagonia. However, their trip soon unravels, as the pair have no idea what awaits them in the heights of the mountains.
- The White Vault: Acquisition – Stashed away in the streets of Paris, an illegal artifact auction house auctions off unique pieces to the highest bidder; in particular, a journal is up for grabs.

=== Special release ===
- The White Vault: A Musical – A 2019 Patreon-exclusive release, and a musical parody of the first two seasons of the show.

== Critical reception ==
The show has been praised for its diverse cast, immersive soundscape, and use of different languages. The podcast has been featured on the front pages of iTunes, Pandora Radio, Spotify, and Himalaya, on the top 10 charts for The Arts and Performing Arts on iTunes, on the top 50 chart for 'All of iTunes' in the US, and on numerous blogs for 'Best Podcasts/Audio Dramas of 2017'.

== Awards and honors ==
Year	Award	Category	Citation	
2018	HEAR Now: Audio Fiction and Arts Festival	The Gold Listening Showcase Official Selection		
2018	Mark Time Award	Silver Award, The Ogle For Horror		
2018	Audio Verse Award	Finalist: Best Production; Best Writing; Best Audio Engineering; Best Performances		
2019	Discover Pod Award	Finalist (Best Fiction Podcast)		
2019 & 2020	Webby Award	Honoree (Best Original Music / Sound Design in Podcasting)		
2019	Audio Verse Award	Best Vocal Composition in a Production (The White Vault: A Musical); Best Action Sound Design in a Production (The White Vault); Best Environment Sound Design in a New Production (The White Vault: Imperial); Best Environment Sound Design in a Production (The White Vault); Best Writing of a New Audio Play Production (The White Vault: Imperial); Best Performance for a New Audio Play Production – Ewan Chung as Jingwei Cheng (The White Vault: Imperial); Best Performance for an Audio Play Production – Eyþór Viðarsson as Jónas Þórirsson (The White Vault); Best New Audio Play Production (The White Vault: Imperial); Best Audio Play Production (The White Vault)		
2020	Audio Verse Award	Best Instrumental Composition in a New Production (The White Vault: Iluka); Best Instrumental Composition in a Production (The White Vault); Best Action Sound Design in a New Production (The White Vault: Iluka); Best Action Sound Design in a Production (The White Vault); Best Environment Sound Design in a New Production (The White Vault: Iluka); Best Environment Sound Design in a Production (The White Vault); Best Writing of a New Audio Play Production (The White Vault: Iluka); Best Writing of an Audio Play Production (The White Vault); Best Performance of a Supporting Role in a New Audio Play Production – Daniel Muñoz as Dr. Oscar Flores (The White Vault: Iluka); Best Performance of a Leading Role in a New Audio Play Production – Beth Eyre as Dr. Amelia Murray (The White Vault: Iluka); Best Performance of a Role in an Ensemble Cast for an Audio Play Production – Danilo Vieira Battistini as Lucas Criado (The White Vault); Best Performance of a Role in an Ensemble Cast for an Audio Play Production – Diane Casanova as Eva Olivia Moreno (The White Vault); Best New Audio Play Production (The White Vault: Iluka); Best Audio Play Production (The White Vault)		
2020	HEAR Now: Audio Fiction and Arts Festival	The Platinum Listening Showcase Official Selection		
2021	Webby Award	People's Voice Award Winner for Scripted Fiction Podcast		
2021	Audio Verse Award	Best Original Compositions in an Existing Production (The White Vault); Best Music Direction for an Existing Production (The White Vault); Best Action Sound Design in a New Production (The White Vault: Avrum); Best Action Sound Design in an Existing Production (The White Vault); Best Environment Sound Design in a New Production (The White Vault: Avrum); Best Environment Sound Design in an Existing Production (The White Vault); Best Writing for an Existing Production (The White Vault); Best Vocal Direction of a New Production (The White Vault: Avrum); Best Vocal Direction of an Existing Production (The White Vault); Best Performance of a Guest Role in a New Production – Allen Lewis Rickman as David (The White Vault: Avrum); Best Performance of a Leading Role in a New Production – Yelena Shmulenson as Avrum Ben Judah (The White Vault: Avrum); Best Performance of a Leading Role in a New Production – Lika Khukhashvili as Rivka (The White Vault: Avrum); Best Cover Art for a Production (The White Vault); Best New Audio Play Production (The White Vault: Avrum); Best Audio Play Production (The White Vault)		
2022	Audio Verse Award	Best Existing Audio Play Production (The White Vault); Best Writing for an Existing Production (The White Vault); Best Action Sound Design for an Existing Production (The White Vault); Best Environment Sound Design for an Existing Production (The White Vault); Best Composition for an Existing Production – "Beneath the Ice" (The White Vault); Best Composition for an Existing Production – "Inheritance"(The White Vault); Best Music Direction of an Existing Production (The White Vault); Best Vocal Direction of an Existing Production (The White Vault); Best Guest Performer in an Existing Production – Eyþór Viðarsson (The White Vault)		
2022	Webby Award	Honoree (Best Individual Episode Scripted Fiction)		
2023	Minnesota WebFest	Best Podcast Director (Travis Vengroff – The White Vault)	Best Horror Podcast (Nomination)	Best Overall Podcast (Nomination)
2023	Baltimore Next Media Web Festival	Best Ensemble Cast – Audio Fiction (The White Vault: Avrum)		

== Production ==
The budget for the show comes entirely from its fans via crowdfunding through Patreon, and its creators regularly host educational panels across the US on creating radio drama podcasts, including: MAGFest 2020, NY Comciccon 2019, The Austin Film Festival 2019, PodX 2019 (Nashville), Podcon 2019 (Seattle), Podfest 2018–2020 (Orlando), Emerald City Comic Con (2020) Tampa Bay Comic Con (2016–2018), Rose City Comic Con (2017–2019), WW: Philadelphia (2017), and WW: St Louis (2017). They also release exclusive content and episodes through their Patreon such as the spinoff stories Artifact, Imperial, Iluka, Avrum, and The White Vault: A Musical.

== Live performances ==
In December 2017, The White Vault announced that they would perform a live version of their show in New York City as a part of The NoSleep Podcast's 2018 Sleepless Tour. They performed a prequel episode, 'Ashore', at the Highline Ballroom, flying cast members in from Iceland, Germany, and the UK for the event, which was sold out a month before the event. A second live show also took place on October 19 in Cambridge, MA, which also sold out.
