= Liberty: Deception =

Science fiction graphic novel comic book series

- Cover of Liberty: Deception No. 1.

Publication information
- Publisher: John Dossinger Publishing, Editions KAMITI
- Genre: Post-apocalyptic, adventure, drama
- Publication date: 2016

Creative team
- Created by: Travis Vengroff (creator), James Adam Cartwright (co-creator)
- Artist(s): Joana Lafuente, Raymund Bermudez, Jezreel Rojales, Sean Hill, Deon De Lange, Casey Bailey, Jason Shawn Alexander, Dave Dorman, James Adam Cartwright
- Letterer: Eduardo Camacho

Liberty: Deception is a dystopian science fiction graphic novel comic book series by Travis Vengroff, self-published in 2016 under the American publishing company John Dossinger Publishing. It is part of Vengroff's Liberty fictional universe. The series, which takes place on a failed terraforming mining colony, follows the clashes that take place between the remnants of the planet's totalitarian military state and the chaotic gangs beyond its walls. The series's covers are primarily by Eirich Olson, Casey Bailey, Jason Shawn Alexander, and Dave Dorman.

== Publication history ==
A prototype book called Liberty: Defiance was released in 2010 and over 3200 copies were given away at various events throughout Florida like Free Comic Book Day and Tampa Bay Comic Con to build interest in the series. Liberty: Deception's Zero Issue was released at the Chicago Comic & Entertainment Expo in 2016 and received praise for its unique art style, paneling, detailed universe, use of dialects, and for its limited edition cover by Dave Dorman.

The first volume of Liberty: Deception (which contains the first three chapters) was released at New York Comic Con in October, 2016, and sold over 300 copies that weekend . In April, 2016 the production team raised $20,947 through Kickstarter to fund the print costs of their first volume. A French language edition has since been published by Editions KAMITI. The second volume of Liberty: Deception was released in May, 2020 digitally on ComiXology.

== Synopsis ==
The setting is an Earth outpost beyond the Solar System that has been cut off from the rest of humanity for centuries. Government propaganda actor Tertulius Justus uses his false reputation as a war hero to avoid execution at the hands of the military state after he's been fired from his job. With nowhere else to hide, he sets off for the lawless, Post-apocalyptic expanse beyond the safety of the state's walls.

== Main characters ==
- Archon Reeve, the deified leader of the colony.
- Tertulius Justus, a television actor working for the government who is falsely portrayed to be a war hero.
- Twitch, a former member of the Rocket Punk gang.
- Claw Conway, a crude arms dealer with a prosthetic claw arm.
- Liv Conway, the leader of the Conway Brothers, who is affiliated with the Skull Clacker gang.
- Will Conway, a hacker whose body has been augmented to find hidden firearms caches that his half-brothers locate and sell.
- Gust Conway, the oldest half-brother, and sword swinging bodyguard for the Conways.
