= Eric Nelsen =

American actor and producer (born 1991)

- Born: June 26, 1991 (age 35); West Palm Beach, Florida, U.S.
- Occupations: Actor; producer
- Years active: 2006–present
- Spouse: Sainty Reid (m. 2013)
- Children: 2

Eric Nelsen (born June 26, 1991) is an American actor and producer. He is known for his work as an actor in the Paramount+ western series 1883. On stage, Nelsen portrayed Brett Sampson in the original Broadway production of 13, and he starred in The Good Mother. He has appeared in over numerous television series, including as a series regular in the Hulu revival of All My Children, a recurring role in The Affair on Showtime, The Blacklist, Girls, The Following, NCIS, Blue Bloods, and iCarly. Nelson appeared in the Universal Pictures film A Walk Among the Tombstones opposite Academy Award nominee Liam Neeson, and in Coming Through the Rye opposite Academy Award winner Chris Cooper.

In 2018, Nelsen most recently won a Daytime Emmy Award for Outstanding Supporting Actor in a Digital Daytime Drama Series for his work on the Amazon web series The Bay. As a producer, Nelsen has won three Daytime Emmys for The Bay and a Tony Award for the Broadway play The Inheritance. He produced the indie feature Wakefield starring Bryan Cranston and Jennifer Garner.

At age 23, Nelsen became the youngest producer in history to win an Emmy Award.

== Personal life ==
Nelsen is a native of West Palm Beach, Florida. He moved to New York City with his family at the age of 13. Eric married actress Sainty Reid (now Nelsen) in her hometown of Fort Worth, Texas on November 29, 2013, and she gave birth to their daughter Molly Morgan Nelsen on October 1, 2019, in Los Angeles, California. They now reside in Fort Worth.

== Filmography ==
Film
Year	Title	Role	Notes
TBA	Gettysburg 1863	Thomas McClean	Filming
2026	The Wolf and the Lamb	Dr. Roy Hawkins	
2024	Cottonmouth	Billy Dunn	
2019	The Last Whistle	Greg Reid	
2018	Nightmare Cinema	Fred / The Welder	Starring alongside Mickey Rourke
2016	Happy Baby	Theo	
2015	Coming Through the Rye	Ted Tyler	Starring alongside Chris Cooper
2014	A Walk Among the Tombstones	Howie	Starring alongside Liam Neeson
2013	Epic	Additional voices	Starring alongside Christoph Waltz

Television
Year	Title	Role	Notes
2006	Sensing Murder	Donald Neufeld Jr.	Episode: "Random Killer"
2006	Guiding Light	Kevin Ross Marler	Episode 14,890
2007	iCarly	Zeke	Episode: "iDream of Dance"
2008	Law & Order	Brandon Doherty	Episode: "Betrayal"
2009	The Battery's Down	Bat Mitzvah Guest	Episode: "Bad Bad News"
2010	Zeke and Luther	Bob	Episode: "Ball of Trash"
2010	The Good Wife	Mark	Episode: "Taking Control"
2010	Big Time Rush	Windmill	Episode: "Big Time Mansion"
2010–2017	The Bay	Daniel Garrett	
2011	Blue Bloods	Alex Kasper	Episode: "Innocence"
2012	NYC 22	Hazzard	3 episodes
2013	All My Children	AJ Chandler	32 episodes
2015	Girls	Lewis	Episode: "Female Author"
2015	The Following	Justin Windsor	Episode: "Reunion"
2015	The Blacklist	David Kenyon	Episode: "The Kenyon Family (No. 71)"
2015	NCIS	Sean Quinn	Episode: "Blood Brothers"
2018	The Affair	Bram	2 episodes
2021–2022	1883	Ennis	5 episodes
2026	Law & Order: Special Victims Unit	Scott Paletta	Episode: "Volition"

== Broadway ==
Year	Show	Role	Notes
2008	13	Brett Sampson	Bernard B. Jacobs Theatre; 2008 – January 4, 2009
2019	The Inheritance	Co-producer	Ethel Barrymore Theatre; 2019 – 2020

== Awards and nominations ==
Year	Award	Nominated Work	Category	Result	Ref.
2015	Daytime Emmy Award	The Bay	Outstanding New Approaches Drama Series	Won	
2017	Daytime Emmy Award	The Bay	Outstanding Digital Daytime Drama Series	Won	
2018	Daytime Emmy Award	The Bay	Outstanding Supporting Actor in a Digital Daytime Drama Series	Won	
2018	Daytime Emmy Award	The Bay	Outstanding Digital Daytime Drama Series	Won	
2020	Tony Award	The Inheritance	Best Play	Won	
2020	Drama Desk Award	The Inheritance	Outstanding Play	Won	
2020	Drama League Award	The Inheritance	Outstanding Production of a Play	Won	
2020	Outer Critics Circle Award	The Inheritance	Outstanding New Broadway Play	Won	
2020	GLAAD Media Award	The Inheritance	Outstanding Broadway Production	Won	
