= David Freeman =

David Freeman may refer to:

- David Freeman (athlete) (born 1982), Puerto Rican middle-distance runner
- David Freeman (business owner) (born 1984), Australian business owner
- David Freeman (footballer) (born 1979), Irish footballer
- David Freeman (journalist) (born 1959), American journalist
- David Freeman (music historian) (1939–2023), collector, historian, and authority on old-time and bluegrass music
- David Freeman (musician) (born 1957), member of The Flys and The Lover Speaks
- David Freeman (screenwriter) (born 1941), American screenwriter
- David Freeman (solicitor) (1928–2015), British solicitor
- David Freeman-Mitford, 2nd Baron Redesdale (1878–1958), English landowner and father of the Mitford sisters
- David Guthrie Freeman (1920–2001), American badminton and tennis player
- David Justin Freeman (born 1984), Christian minister, private educator and conservative political activist
- S. David Freeman (1926–2020), American engineer, attorney, and author
- Dave Freeman (American author) (1961–2008), American advertising executive and co-author of 100 Things to Do Before You Die
- Dave Freeman (British writer) (1922–2005), British comedy writer

== Fictional characters ==
- David Scott Freeman, main character in 1986 film Flight of the Navigator

== See also ==
- David Freedman (disambiguation)
