= Penka Kouneva =

Bulgarian-American composer

Penka Kouneva Пенка Кунева
- Born: February 25, 1967 (age 59); Sofia, Bulgaria
- Occupations: Composer, Orchestrator, Soundtrack Producer
- Website: http://www.penkakouneva.com/

Penka Kouneva (Bulgarian: Пенка Кунева) (/ˈpɛŋkɑː kuːˈnɛvɑː/; born February 25, 1967, in Sofia, Bulgaria) is a Bulgarian-American composer, orchestrator and soundtrack producer. In 1999, she began working in film and television and in 2009 began to score for videogames (Prince of Persia: The Forgotten Sands and Transformers: Revenge of the Fallen video games, with themes by Steve Jablonsky). Her music is a blend of Bulgarian influences, classical training, rock sensibility, and modern film and game soundtracks.

Kouneva has released two award-winning concept albums: The Woman Astronaut (2015, on Varèse Sarabande / Universal Music Group) and A Warrior's Odyssey (2012, on Howlin’ Wolf Records / Sumthing Else) both receiving 5-star press.

== Adolescence and early career (1990–1999) ==
Kouneva was born and raised in Sofia, Bulgaria, and began studying piano at the age of six. Her mother was a professor of music theory at the Bulgarian Academy of Music and her father was a scientist at the Institute of Chemical Technologies. At the age of twelve, Kouneva composed and performed incidental music for a children’s theater show that ran for a season. She earned fifteen dollars per show; the official start of her career as a paid composer. Kouneva attended the Sofia High School of Music and achieved a degree in piano. She later enrolled in the National Academy of Music and graduated with a degree in music theory.

In 1990, she was awarded the Mary Duke Biddle Graduate Fellowship to study composition at Duke University, North Carolina, USA. At Duke she studied composition and orchestration with the American orchestral composers Stephen Jaffe and Scott Lindroth and with the Dutch post-minimalist Louis Andriessen. In 1997, Kouneva received Duke University's first-ever Ph.D. degree in composition in the brand-new doctoral program. In 1997, she also received a Green Card as an “Alien of Extraordinary Abilities.”

== Hollywood career (1999 – present) ==
In 1999, Kouneva arrived in Los Angeles. Her first mentor was the Emmy-winning composer Patrick Williams whom she met at Duke. She began her career by scoring independent features and thesis films for graduates at the American Film Institute. In 2004, she began to score TV specials and genre telefilms for the SyFy Channel (Chupacabra: Dark Seas, Ice Spiders, Nuclear Hurricane). In 2004, Kouneva met Steve Jablonsky (composer for the Transformers films) and became his orchestrator. She scored video games in 2009 with Ubisoft’s Prince of Persia: The Forgotten Sands and Activision’s Transformers: Revenge Of The Fallen games. For the Transformers game, Kouneva wrote original high-action loops incorporating the musical style that Jablonsky established in the Transformers films – epic orchestra, rousing action melodies and heavy percussion. For the Prince of Persia game, Kouneva composed two hours of original in-game interactive score, fusing inspirations of Persian, Indian and Middle-Eastern music with epic orchestra.

Her credits also include independent features (Primrose Lane, The Third Nail (starring Chloë Grace Moretz), Midnight Movie (starring Brea Grant) as well as in television (Forensic Files, Modern Marvels)). Since 2012, Kouneva has been scoring many independent games (PS4 Medieval game Rollers of the Realm, VR action project Hades, the military shooter H-Hour on Steam and iOS titles IronKill, Black Hole Explorer, Pierre Roux’s Infinite Warrior.)

In addition to composing, Kouneva is a studio orchestrator and has made Hollywood history as the first woman Lead Orchestrator on studio blockbusters since Shirley Walker. (Walker was instrumental for Hans Zimmer, Danny Elfman and others.) Kouneva was Lead Orchestrator on Teenage Mutant Ninja Turtles: Out of the Shadows, Elysium, Ender's Game (films) and Sony's 2015 Game of the Year Bloodborne. Other orchestration credits include the franchises The Matrix, Transformers, Pirates of the Caribbean: At World's End; the games Gears of War 2 & Gears of War 3, World of Warcraft, StarCraft II, Diablo III, Overwatch, Sims, Lord of The Rings: War in the North, and many low-budget independent films, such as Alfons Conde's scores for Elio Quiroga's films Home delivery, The Dark Hour (2006 film) or No-Do, and games.

In 2013, the Dallas Chamber Symphony commissioned Kouneva to write an original film score for By The Sea starring Charlie Chaplin. The score premiered live to film in concert on November 19, 2013 at Moody Performance Hall with Richard McKay conducting.

== Industry leadership ==
Kouneva is on the Advisory Board of Game Developers Conference, the world’s foremost conference for game professionals (2014–present), an Advisor for Sundance Composers Lab (2002–2015) and a Mentor for Game Audio Network Guild (G.A.N.G.) Scholars (2014–current). As a guest artist, she has presented invited lectures and seminars at Duke University, Davidson College, USC, Berklee College of Music, Berklee Valencia, CalArts, The Musicians’ Institute, CSULB and many others. She has also presented at the following conferences: Game Developers Conference (2013, 2014, 2015, 2016), East Coast Game Conference (2012), Power Of Play (2015, 2016), Intel Buzz Workshop London (2016), The Society of Composers and Lyricists (2013), Game Sound Con (2013, 2014, 2015), amongst many other.

Kouneva is profiled in two textbooks (Chance Thomas' “Composing Music For Games” (2016) and Tom Hoover's “Soundtrack Nation” (2011), in a Keynote address (Game Sound Con 2015 Keynote address), in national press and NPR. Additionally, she has been included in two feature-length documentaries: Beep: A Documentary History of Game Sound (2016) and SCORE: A Film Music Documentary (2016).

== Mentoring and advocacy ==
Kouneva is known for building and training high-performance teams for score production. Amongst her notable protégés are the Hollywood composers and orchestrators Philip Klein, Ben Bromfield, Alexandre Cote, Catherine Grealish, Dallas Aimer, Nicolas Repetto, Steven Melin, Amie Doherty, Fred Emory Smith and many others. Kouneva's arrival to Hollywood was unprepared for the business aspects of entertainment, so she focuses to instructing her protégés to be ready for such challenges. Kouneva’s Composer Career Master Classes are published online by Designing Music Now. Her Gears of War 2 main theme analysis is published by Output.com.

Kouneva is also an advocate for artist growth and for the advancement of women composers. She has led, curated and participated in panels, seminars, and concerts promoting women film and game composers in Los Angeles, at Game Developers Conference, and the Society of Composers and Lyricists.

== Philanthropy ==
In 2015, Kouneva established and funded an Orchestral Reading for Duke Graduate Composers with the North Carolina Symphony Orchestra. Two graduate composers selected by Duke Music Department will receive a professional reading and recording of their compositions by the nationally recognized symphony orchestra. With this opportunity, she hopes to give a competitive edge to composers as they start their careers.

== Personal life ==
In 2004 Kouneva married music editor Daniel Schweiger and has one daughter with him, born in 2006.

== Discography ==
The lists below show some of Kouneva's most notable work.

=== Composer ===
==== Albums ====
Year	Title	Label
2015	The Woman Astronaut	Varèse Sarabande – Universal Music Group
2012	A Warrior’s Odyssey	Howlin’ Wolf Records – Sumthing Else
2011	Play For Japan	iTunes
2010	Prince of Persia: The Forgotten Sands	Ubisoft
2010	Midnight Movie	Howlin’ Wolf Records

==== Film scores ====
Year	Title	Director	Starring
2016	Primrose Lane	Kathleen Davison	K. Davison, Alysia Reiner
2008	Midnight Movie	Jack Messitt	Brea Grant
2007	The Third Nail	Kevin Lewis	Chloë Grace Moretz
2004	The Picture of Dorian Gray	Dave Rosenbaum	Josh Duhamel

==== Video games – Composer and Co-composer (selected) ====
Year	Title	Studio	Main Composer
2015	H-Hour: World’s Elite	Steam	Penka Kouneva
2010	Prince of Persia: The Forgotten Sands	Ubisoft	Steve Jablonsky
2009	Transformers: Revenge of the Fallen	Activision	Steve Jablonsky

==== Television – Composer (selected) ====
Year	Title	Distributor	Network
2007	Ice Spiders	Sony Pictures Home Entertainment	SyFy Channel
2005	Meltdown: Days of Destruction	Regent Entertainment	SyFy Channel
2005	Chupacabra: Dark Seas	Sony Pictures Home Entertainment	SyFy Channel

==== Television – Team Composer and Production Music (selected) ====
Year	Title	Network
2009–present	Lockup: Extended Stay	MSNBC
2005–present	Forensic Files	TruTV
2005–present	Modern Marvels	History Channel
2005–present	Dogfights	History Channel

=== Orchestrator ===
==== Lead Orchestrator – Film (selected) ====
Year	Film	Studio	For Composer
2016	Teenage Mutant Ninja Turtles: Out of the Shadows	Paramount	Steve Jablonsky
2015	The Last Witch Hunter	Lionsgate	Steve Jablonsky
2014	Elysium	Sony Pictures	Ryan Amon
2014	Ender's Game	Lionsgate	Steve Jablonsky
2014	Need for Speed	DreamWorks	Nathan Furst
2013	Hansel and Gretel: Witch Hunters	Paramount	Atli Orvarsson
2007	Hostel: Part 2	Lionsgate	Nathan Barr
2006	Texas Chainsaw Massacre 2	New Line Cinema	Steve Jablonsky
2005	Hostel	Lionsgate	Nathan Barr

==== Team Orchestrator – Film (selected) ====
Year	Film	Studio	For Composer
2011	Transformers: Dark of the Moon	Paramount	Steve Jablonsky
2010	A Nightmare on Elm Street (2010)	New Line Cinema	Steve Jablonsky
2009	Transformers: Revenge of the Fallen	Paramount	Steve Jablonsky
2009	Angels and Demons	Sony Pictures	Hans Zimmer
2007	Transformers	Paramount	Steve Jablonsky
2007	Pirates of the Caribbean: At World's End	Walt Disney Pictures	Hans Zimmer
2003	The Matrix Reloaded	Warner Brothers	Don Davis

==== Orchestrator – Video games ====
Year	Title	Studio	For Composer
2015	Bloodborne	Sony Computer Entertainment	
2011	Gears of War 3	Microsoft	Steve Jablonsky
2008	Gears of War 2	Microsoft	Steve Jablonsky
2008	The Sims 3	EA	Steve Jablonsky
2007	World of Warcraft StarCraft II Diablo III Overwatch	Blizzard Entertainment	Neal Acree
2006	Transformers: The Game	Activision	Steve Jablonsky
2002	Enter the Matrix	EON / Atari	Don Davis / Erik Lundborg
