= David Friedman =

David Friedman may refer to:

== Music ==
- David Friedman (percussionist) (born 1944), American jazz musician
- David Friedman (composer) (born 1950), Broadway and film composer

== Film ==
- David Friedman (actor) (born 1973), American film and TV actor and child star of the 1980s
- David F. Friedman (1923–2011), American filmmaker (exploitation films)

== Writers ==
- David Friedman, the birth name of David Benioff (born 1970), American screenwriter
- Dafydd ab Hugh (David Friedman, 1960–2026), science fiction/fantasy writer; political weblogger
- David D. Friedman (born 1945), anarcho-capitalist writer, economist, and medieval reenactor
- David Friedman (poet), American poet
- David Friedman, 19th century Rabbi

== Law ==
- David Friedman (judge), American judge in New York
- David M. Friedman (born 1958), American former bankruptcy lawyer and diplomat, US Ambassador to Israel from 2017 to 2021.

== See also ==
- Friedman
- David Freedman (disambiguation)
- David Freeman (disambiguation)
