= TGG =

TGG may refer to:

- Rugby league football, sometimes referred to as The Greatest Game, shortened to "TGG"
- Sultan Mahmud Airport, airport serving Kuala Terengganu, with IATA code: TGG
- Terbium gallium garnet, a chemical compound whose crystals have a high Verdet constant
- The Golden Girls, television comedy
- The Good Guys (Australasia), chain of consumer electronics retail stores in Australia and New Zealand
- The Gores Group, a private equity firm
- The Great Gatsby, novel by the American author F. Scott Fitzgerald
- The Greatest Generation (podcast), Star Trek podcast
- The Guy Game, adult video game for the PlayStation 2 and Xbox
- Transformational-generative grammar, generative grammar developed in the Chomskyan tradition
- Tryptophan, written as TGG in the DNA codon table
