= Greatest Generation (disambiguation) =

The Greatest Generation is a demographic cohort born between 1901 and 1927.

Greatest Generation may also refer to:

- The Greatest Generation (book), a 1998 book by Tom Brokaw
- The Greatest Generation (album), an album by the Wonder Years
- The Greatest Generation (podcast), a podcast about Star Trek
- "The Greatest Generation", a song by All That Remains from the album The Order of Things
