= Steven Melin =

American music composer

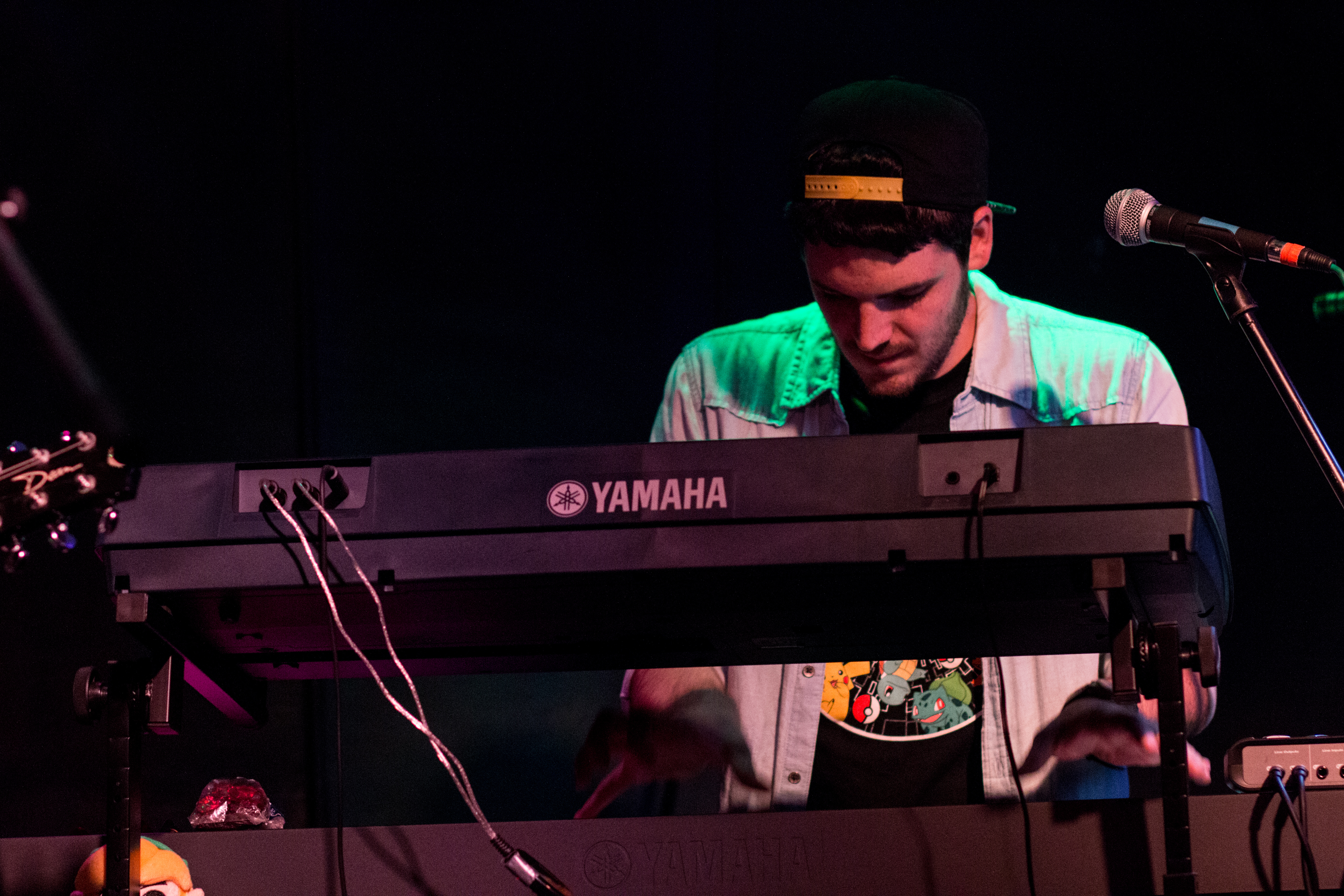

Background information
- Born: Atlanta, Georgia
- Genres: Video game music, orchestral, electronic
- Occupations: Composer, musician
- Instruments: Piano, violin, guitar, synthesizer, percussion
- Years active: 2008–present
- Website: www.stevenmelin.com

Steven Melin is an American music composer for audio drama podcasts, films, television, trailers, and video games. His work has been featured in The Bachelorette, Dark Dice, and IGN Summer of Gaming 2024. His music can be heard across numerous projects and platforms including NBC, CBS, Nintendo Switch, PlayStation, Xbox, and Steam. Melin is one of the top-selling video game music pack creators in the world, the author of the book Family-First Composer, and the founder of the Video Game Music Alliance.

== Early life and education ==
Born into a musical family in Atlanta, Georgia, Melin began playing piano at age 7 and picked up other instruments, including violin, guitar, and percussion, while participating in school orchestras and choirs.

He attended Kennesaw State University in Kennesaw, Georgia, earning a Bachelor of Music in Piano Performance. During this time, he began scoring his own personal projects, as well as writing for music libraries and independent video games.

Melin obtained a Master of Fine Arts in Music Composition for the Screen at Columbia College Chicago in Chicago.

While a student, he worked as an intern for Joel Goodman in Los Angeles, where he helped score new films and create temporary tracks using music from Goodman's archive of compositions. After meeting composer and orchestrator Penka Kouneva, Melin accepted a part-time assistant position and returned to Georgia, where he married and started a family.

== Career ==
Melin's primary musical influences include video game music composers David Wise, Nobuo Uematsu, and Koji Kondo. Over the course of his career, Melin has collaborated with composers including Hitoshi Sakimoto, David Wise, Grant Kirkhope, Yuzo Koshiro, Garry Schyman, and Austin Wintory.

In 2013, Melin began working with Fool & Scholar Productions, composing for Dark Dice, Liberty, The Boar Knight, and The White Vault.

His work has been featured on television shows such as The Bachelorette, Dancing with the Stars, and The Dr. Oz Show. He has also composed music for trailers.

In the video game music industry, Melin is most known for his work on Monster Sanctuary and Beard Blade. He created the best-selling video game music pack Game Music Treasury, featured on game asset stores Unity Asset Store, Unreal Marketplace, Itch.io, and Game Dev Market. In 2022, Melin's video game music packs were featured in a Humble Bundle audio sale that sold over 14,000 times, grossing over $320,000 in sales. In the summer of 2024, he composed transition and logo music for the Guerilla Collective and Indie.io showcases, as part of the IGN Summer of Gaming. He is also the composer for Aethermancer, the spiritual successor to Monster Sanctuary.

Melin has six children and is the author of the book Family-First Composer, about ways for composers to support their families through a career in music composition.

In January 2022, Melin launched the Video Game Music Alliance, a community for music composers dedicated to growing skillsets in video game music composition, production, technology, and business. Its curriculum focuses on building passive income sources, the nuances of working with game developers, and negotiating contracts for custom music. Video Game Music Alliance also offers peer review and virtual masterclasses with many of the leading composers in the video game music industry, including Penka Kouneva, Jeff Rona, Adam Gubman, Jack Wall, Austin Wintory, Tom Salta, Jon Everist, Brian Schmidt, Winifred Phillips, Jason Graves, Grant Kirkhope, Darren Korb, David Wise, Mike Patti, Peter Murray, and Wilbert Roget II.

Melin hosts a weekly livestream on YouTube called the Live Composing Show, where he composes music for commercial projects live for the audience, and occasionally reviews sample libraries and music software.

== Works ==
=== Video games ===
Video games, composer
Year	Work	Developer
2025	Aethermancer	Moi Rai Games
2025	PaperKlay (main theme)	WhyKev
2021	Beard Blade	Glovebox Games
2020	Monster Sanctuary	Moi Rai Games
2018	Liberty: Deception (motion comic)	Fool & Scholar Productions
2018	Cybarian: The Time Travelling Warrior	Ritual Games
2015	A More Beautiful World	Afterthought Studios
2015	Snail Panic	Nehemek Games
2014	Duel School	Columbia College Chicago
2013	Worm Run	Golden Ruby Games

Video games, additional music
Year	Work	Developer
2024	Rack and Slay	Ludokultur
2023	Windmills	Poor Locke
2023	Reaper of Immortals	Mounaim
2022	Tuff Fluff	Rocky Mullet
2022	Peril	Daniel Thurman
2021	Mantle	Game Sage Productions
2021	Cherry Island	Adrien Jeanneret
2020	Shadows of the Lost: A Blood City Tale	OMC Games
2020	Summoner's Fate	D20 Studios
2019	Magnus Quest	Game Sage Productions
2019	Mage	Game Sage Productions
2019	The Dark One	Tenfor
2019	Jar Battlers	Sylph Arcade
2013	The 9 Divine	YoYo Games
2010	Zuwaka	YoYo Games
2008	Rogue Mercenary	YoYo Games

Video games, trailer music
Work	Developer
Frogbound: The Legend of Sir Hopper	Stomaco Studio
Crimson Capes	Poor Locke
Pathfinder: Abomination Vaults	BKOM Studios
Twilight Monk	Aquatic Moon
Abalon Arena	D20 Studios
Moonlighter	Digital Sun
Inkbound	Scribbleforge Games
Dream Tales	Fingers Meet Controller
Sneaky Snake	Sol Key
GLORY	Reach Game Studios

=== Television ===
Year	Work	Network
2023	1000-lb Sisters (1 episode)	TLC
2022	Bachelor in Paradise (1 episode)	ABC
2021	The Bachelorette (1 episode)	ABC
2020	To the Rescue (1 episode)	CBS
2017-2018	The Dr. Oz Show (2 episodes)	Sony Pictures
2015-2017	Dancing with the Stars (5 episodes)	ABC
2014	Fake Off (1 episode)	TruTV

=== Podcasts and audio dramas ===
Year	Work	Producer
2024	Finding Matt Drudge (main theme)	iHeartRadio
2022-2023	The Boar Knight	Fool & Scholar Productions
2022	Don't Mind Cruxmont	Fool & Scholar Productions
2021	The White Vault: Avram	Fool & Scholar Productions
2020	The White Vault: Illuka	Fool & Scholar Productions
2019-2021	The White Vault	Fool & Scholar Productions
2019	The White Vault: Imperial	Fool & Scholar Productions
2018	The White Vault: Artifact	Fool & Scholar Productions
2018-current	Dark Dice	Fool & Scholar Productions
2018	FEE Audio XP	Foundation for Economic Education
2018	FEECast (theme music)	Foundation for Economic Education
2018	Liberty: Vigilance	Fool & Scholar Productions
2017-2018	High School at 12Stone	12Stone Church
2016-2021	Liberty: Tales from the Tower	Fool & Scholar Productions
2015-2017	Liberty: Critical Research	Fool & Scholar Productions

=== Films, videos, and animation ===
Work	Director/producer
IGN Summer of Gaming 2024	IGN
Guerrilla Collective Showcase 2024	Media Indie Exchange
Indie.io Showcase 2024	Indie.io
Super Pastor Kart	12Stone Church
Play Different	12Stone Church
Why Are We Here	12Stone Church
This Is Our Family	12Stone Church
Revolution of One Web Series	Foundation for Economic Education
The Language Tutor Intro	The Language Tutor
How We Thrive: Dian Stan	Foundation for Economic Education
Invisible Hands Web Series	Foundation for Economic Education
The Bomber's Hideout	The Bomber's Hideout
Space to Explore	Katherine Dubois
Duchess of Atholl	Foundation for Economic Education
How We Thrive: Made in Mékhé	Foundation for Economic Education
How We Thrive: Coding Cannabis	Foundation for Economic Education
Thomas Clarkson: The First Abolitionist	Foundation for Economic Education
Avery + Client	Cobblestone Productions
O9EN UP (teaser trailer)	Tyler Lee Allen
2018 Easter Bumper	12Stone Church
Every Bike Needs a Kid	12Stone Church
The Lazy Millennial Intro	Foundation for Economic Education
Heartbreaking Experience with Socialism	Foundation for Economic Education
2017 Alumni News	Columbia College Chicago
All In	Pixel Preacher
For Better or Worse	Pixel Preacher
Like Me	Pixel Preacher
Iron Wolf Academy promo	Iron Wolf Academy
Virtuoso	Charlie Myers
Here Died All Cardinals	Artem Avakian
Grave Innocence	Florida State University
Shades	Magnify Entertainment
Pen Pals	Nancy Williams
Tiger Lily (trailer)	Byron Conrad Erwin
Zombie Tag	Magnify Entertainment
Freeze	Get the Horns Productions

== Awards and nominations ==
Year	Award	Category	Work	Result	Citation
2016	Parsec Awards	Best New Speculative Fiction Podcaster/Team	Liberty: Critical Research	Nominated	
2018	Mark Time Awards	The Ogle for Horror (Silver)	The White Vault	Won	
2018	BANFF Mountain Film and Book Festival	Official Selection	Space to Explore	Nominated	
2019	Environmental Film Festival in the Nation's Capital	Official Selection	Space to Explore	Nominated	
2019	American Documentary Film Festival	Audience Favorite Short	Space to Explore	Won	
2019	Wild & Scenic Film Festival	Official Selection	Space to Explore	Nominated	
2019	Discover Pod Award	Best Fiction Podcast	The White Vault	Nominated	
2019	Audio Verse Awards	Best Vocal Composition in a Production	The White Vault: A Musical	Won	
2019	Webby Awards	Best Original Music / Sound Design in Podcasting	The White Vault	Nominated	
2020	Hear Now Audio Fiction and Arts Festival	Platinum Award	The White Vault	Won	
2020	Hear Now Audio Fiction and Arts Festival	The Gold Listening Showcase Official Selection	Dark Dice	Nominated	
2020	Webby Awards	Best Original Music / Sound Design in Podcasting	The White Vault	Nominated	
2020	Audio Verse Awards	Best Instrumental Composition in a Production	Dark Dice - "Danse Sanguis"	Won	
2020	Audio Verse Awards	Best Vocal Composition in a Production	Dark Dice - "Devil's Gamble”	Won	
2020	Audio Verse Awards	Best Instrumental Composition in a Production	The White Vault	Won	
2020	Audio Verse Awards	Best Instrumental Composition in a New Production	The White Vault: Illuka - "Dredged from the Deep"	Won	
2021	Audio Verse Awards	Best Original Compositions for a New Production	The White Vault - "Avrum"	Nominated	
2021	Audio Verse Awards	Best Music Direction for a Production	The White Vault	Nominated	
2021	Audio Verse Awards	Best Original Compositions for a Production	The White Vault	Won	
2021	Webby Awards	People's Voice Award for Scripted Fiction Podcast	The White Vault	Won	
2022	Audio Verse Award	Best Music Direction of an Existing Production	The White Vault	Nominated	
2022	Audio Verse Award	Best Composition for an Existing Production	The White Vault - "Beneath the Ice"	Nominated	
2022	Audio Verse Award	Best Composition for an Existing Production	Dark Dice - "Light of Eastwood"	Nominated	
2022	Audio Verse Award	Best Composition for a New Production	Don't Mind Cruxmont	Nominated	
2022	Signal Awards	Best Original Score (Listener's Choice)	Dark Dice	Won	
2022	Signal Awards	Best Original Score	Dark Dice	Nominated	
2022	Signal Awards	Most Innovative Audio Experience	Dark Dice	Won	
2022	Signal Awards	Most Innovative Audio Experience (Listener's Choice)	Dark Dice	Won	
2023	Baltimore Next Media Web Fest	Best Actual Play	Dark Dice	Won	
2023	Baltimore Next Media Web Fest	Best Score in an Actual Play	Dark Dice	Won	
2023	Baltimore Next Media Web Fest	Best Fantasy for Children – Audio Fiction	The Boar Knight	Won	
2023	Indie Series Awards	Best Audio Fiction Series	Dark Dice	Nominated	
2023	Indie Series Awards	Best Original Score	Dark Dice	Nominated	
2023	Indie Series Awards	Best Original Song	The Boar Knight - "The Boar Knight Theme"	Nominated	
2023	MN Webfest	Best Original Score in a Podcast	Dark Dice	Nominated	
2023	MN Webfest	Best Fantasy Podcast	Dark Dice	Nominated	
2023	MN Webfest	Best Family Podcast	The Boar Knight	Nominated	
2023	MN Webfest	Best Fantasy Podcast	The Boar Knight	Won	
2023	MN Webfest	Best Original Score in a Podcast	The Boar Knight	Won	
2023	New Jersey Web Festival	Best Original Song	The Boar Knight - "Sinister Stirring Stories”	Won	
2023	New Zealand Web Fest	Best Actual Play Podcast	Dark Dice	Nominated	
2023	New Zealand Web Fest	Best Fiction Podcast	Don't Mind Cruxmont	Nominated	
2023	Rio WebFest	Best Actual Play	Dark Dice	Nominated	
2023	Rio WebFest	Best Fiction Podcast	The Boar Knight	Nominated	
2023	Webby Awards	Best Individual Episode Scripted Fiction	The White Vault	Nominated	
2024	Cusco WebFest	Best Sound of a Fiction Podcast	The Boar Knight	Won	
2024	Cusco WebFest	Best Environment on a Fiction Podcast	The Boar Knight	Won	
2024	Cusco WebFest	Best Sound Design in an Actual Play	Dark Dice	Won	
