= Carl Schimmel =

American composer

- Born: 1975 (age 50–51); Pensacola, FL
- Occupation: composer
- Known for: contemporary classical music
- Awards: Joseph H. Bearns Prize
- Website: carlschimmel.com

Carl Schimmel is an American composer of contemporary classical music. He has been awarded the Joseph H. Bearns Prize from Columbia University, a Guggenheim Fellowship, a commission from the Fromm Music Foundation of Harvard University, a fellowship from the American Academy of Arts and Letters, and other honors. An album of his compositions, Roadshow, was released in 2017.

== Education and early career ==
Schimmel was born in 1975 in Pensacola, Florida and raised in Wakefield, Rhode Island. He received degrees from Case Western Reserve University (B.A. Mathematics & Music, 1997), Yale School of Music (M.M. Music Composition, 1999), and Duke University (Ph.D. Music Composition, 2008). His mentors at these institutions included Martin Bresnick, Stephen Jaffe, and Sydney Hodkinson.

== Career ==
Schimmel's music has received numerous awards including the Lee Ettelson Award, first prize in the Left Coast Chamber Ensemble competition, a First Music Award from the New York Youth Symphony, and first place in the Clefworks Composition Competition. His music has been performed by the Minnesota Orchestra, the Louisiana Philharmonic, Alarm Will Sound, Da Capo Chamber Players, and many other ensembles. A 2010 performance of his work Four Nocturnes from The Oblivion Ha-Ha by Lucy Shelton and Da Capo Chamber Players was positively reviewed in The New York Times.

In 2017, Schimmel received a Goddard Lieberson Fellowship from the American Academy of Arts and Letters, awarded to "young composers of extraordinary gifts." In 2018 he received a Guggenheim Fellowship as well as a commission from the Fromm Music Foundation of Harvard University to write a new work for the Left Coast Chamber Ensemble. In 2020, Schimmel was awarded a general commission from the Barlow Endowment to write a new work for the Daedalus Quartet.

Schimmel is Associate Professor Music Theory and Composition at Illinois State University in Normal, Illinois.
