= Richard Toensing =

American composer and educator (1940–2014)

Richard Toensing (March 11, 1940 - July 2, 2014) was an American composer and music educator. He studied composition at St. Olaf College and the University of Michigan, Ann Arbor, where he earned the Doctor of Musical Arts degree in 1967. His most notable teachers include Ross Lee Finney and Leslie Bassett.

After an initial appointment at Upsala College in East Orange, New Jersey in 1966, Toensing joined the faculty of the University of Colorado at Boulder College of Music in 1972. Toensing retired in 2005 from the College of Music, where he served as Professor of Composition and as the former Director of the University's Electronic Music Studio, New Music Festival, and New Music Ensemble, as well as Chair of the Composition and Theory department from 1984 to 2001.

Raised a Lutheran, Toensing joined the Eastern Orthodox Church in the 1990s. He later wrote Christmas carols and Kontakion on the Nativity of Christ, a setting of a sixth-century poem by St. Romanos.

Toensing received numerous awards for composition most notably from Columbia University (Joseph H. Bearns Prize), the John Simon Guggenheim Memorial Foundation, and the National Endowment for the Arts, and BMI. He was selected as a Fellow for the MacDowell Colony three different times.
