= Ciompi Quartet =

American string quartet

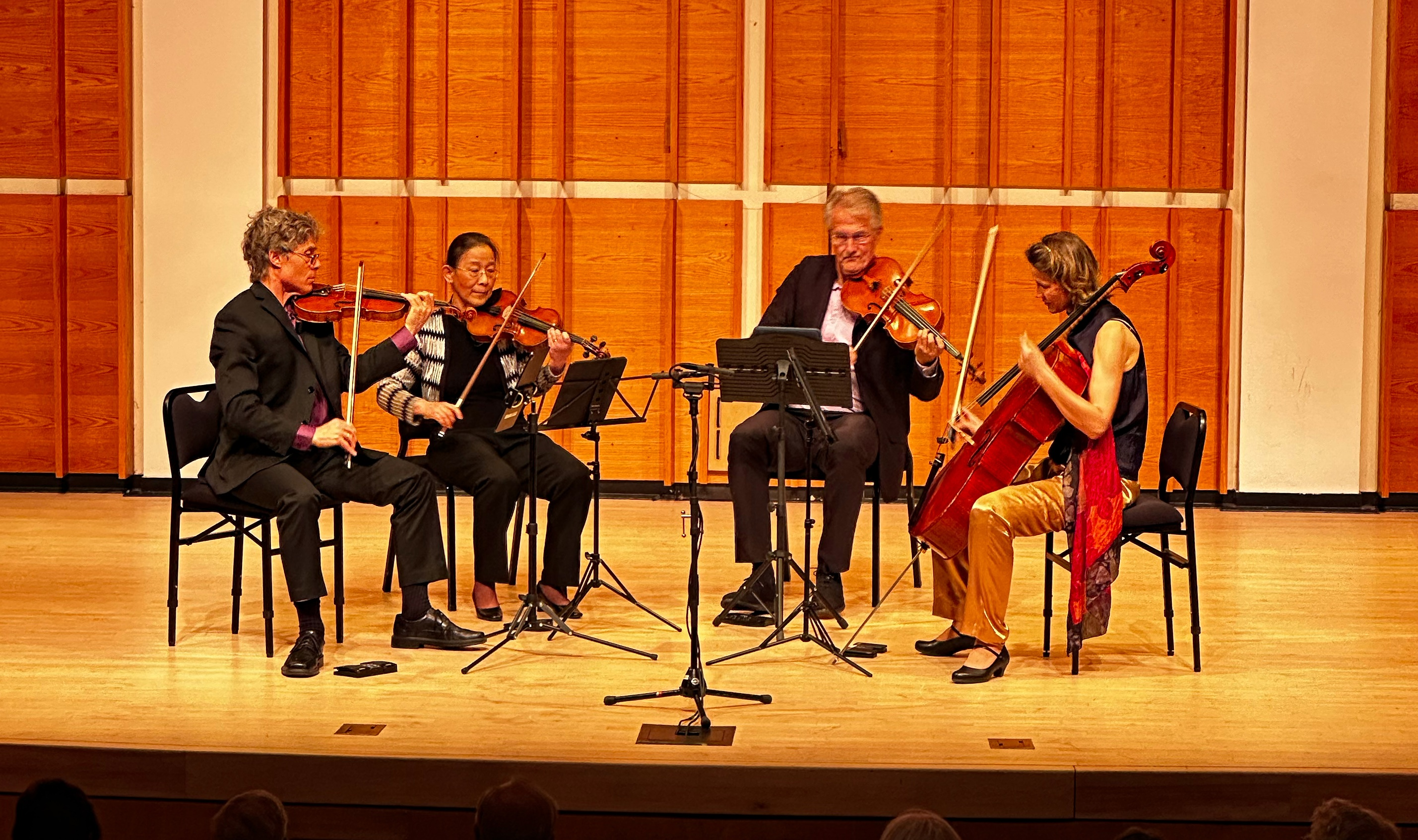
- Ciompi Quartet at Merkin Concert Hall, 2025

Background information
- Origin: Durham, North Carolina, North Carolina, United States
- Genre: Contemporary classical
- Occupation: Chamber ensemble
- Years active: 1965 – present
- Labels: New Focus Recordings; Naxos; CRI; Arabesque Records; Albany Records; Gasparo; Sheffield Lab; Toccata Classics
- Members: Eric Pritchard (violin); Hsiao-mei Ku (violin); Jonathan Bagg (viola); Caroline Stinson (cello)
- Website: ciompi.org

The Ciompi Quartet is an American string quartet in residence at Duke University in Durham, North Carolina. It is one of the world's most enduring string quartets, having celebrated its 60th season in 2025. The ensemble is noted for its long-standing commitment to both traditional repertoire and new music, its active pedagogy, and its role in the musical life of Duke University.

== History ==
The quartet was founded in 1965 by Giorgio Ciompi, a Florentine violinist, as part of Duke University's artist-in-residence program. The founding members were Ciompi (first violin), Julia Mueller (viola), Arlene DiCecco (second violin), and Luca DiCecco (cello). In 1966, they were officially appointed as the quartet-in-residence at Duke, a role they maintain to this day.

== Artistic Profile and Activities ==
The Ciompi Quartet is deeply involved in both performance and education. All current members are professors of the practice in Duke University's Music Department, where they teach, coach chamber music, and lead workshops. Their presence on campus extends to informal concerts (in dormitories and classrooms) as well as formal recitals. Over its decades-long career, the quartet has performed across five continents, including tours in Europe, Asia, and the Americas.

== Members ==
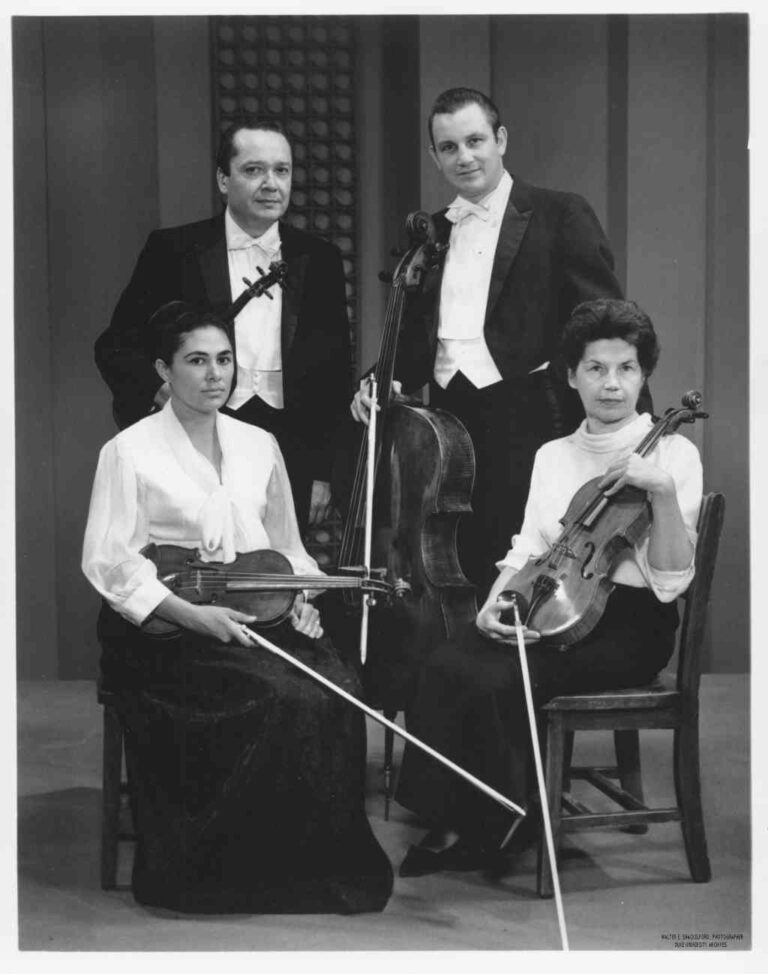
Ciompi Quartet - Founding Members

First Violin

- 1965 - 1983: Giorgio Ciompi
- 1984 - 1994: Bruce Berg
- 1995 - present: Eric Pritchard

Second Violin

- 1965 - 1973: Arlene DiCecco
- 1973 - 1981: Claudia Erdberg
- 1982 - 1990: Claudia Bloom
- 1990 - present: Hsiao-mei Ku

Viola

- 1965 - 1975: Julia Mueller
- 1975 - 1979: Bruce Plumb
- 1979 - 1986: George Taylor
- 1986 - present: Jonathan Bagg

Violoncello

- 1965 - 1973: Luca DiCecco
- 1973 - 1974: Sharon Robinson
- 1974 - 2018: Fred Raimi
- 2018 - present: Caroline Stinson

== Repertoire and Commissions ==
While the Ciompi Quartet has a solid footing in the classical and romantic quartet tradition, it is also a strong advocate for contemporary music. Over five decades they have commissioned and premiered works by many composers, especially those associated with Duke University, including Paul Schoenfield, Stephen Jaffe, Scott Lindroth, and Melinda Wagner.

A particularly notable collaboration was with pipa player Min Xiao-Fen, for whom contemporary composers such as Alan Chan and Andrew Waggoner wrote new works, including a project titled An American in Shanghai: Forgotten Stories.

In recent years they have solidified their commitment to young writers by forming “The Portfolio Project”. The program offers commissions to current Duke graduate composers for short string quartet movements which are then rehearsed, workshopped and performed by Ciompi. In 2025/26 they expanded the opportunity to also include students from University of North Carolina Greensboro.

== Commissioned Works ==
Composer	Work	Year	Premiere Date
Maximiliano Amici	Encounters	2024	March 2025
Sidney Marquez Boquiren	Paghirap, Pagsiskap, At Pagpupunyagi	2024	2024
Alan Chan	Catch Me at the Canidrome	2024	April 2024
Andrew Waggoner	Forgotten Stories	2024	April 2024
John Supko	Soleil Noir	2021	February 2021
Scott Lindroth	Schley Road	2019	April 2019
David Kirkland Garner	Skye & Glass	2016	February 2016
Stephen Jaffe	String Quartet No. 3	2015	April 2015
Melinda Wagner	My Tioga	2014	April 2014
Scott Lindroth	String Quintet	2013	April 2013
Donald Wheelock	String Quartet No. 6	2012	March 2012
John Supko	Inland Ocean	2011	April 2011
Chiayu Hsu	Journey to the West	2010	April 2010
David Kirkland Garner	i ain't broke (but i'm badly bent)	2009	2009
Mark Kuss	Bent 1-5	2008	November 2008
Anthony M. Kelley	Sidelines	2008	2008
Robert Ward	Oboe Quintet	2007	February 2007
Marc Faris	Mountain Music	2006	November 2006
Mark Kuss	Lullabys	2004	June 2004
Scott Lindroth	Nasuh	2004	February 2004
Mark Kuss	Reminiscence	2003	June 2003
Paul Schoenfield	String Quartet No. 2 Memoirs	2003	April 2003
James Bolle	String Quartet #2	2002	May 2002
Nathaniel Stookey	Musée Mecanique	2002	April 2002
Sidney Boquiren	Pagsamba	2001	2001
Malcolm Peyton	Second String Quartet	2001	2001
Mark Kuss	Elegy	2001	2001
Joanne Metcalf	Hopeful Monster	2000	2000
Mark Scearce	String Quartet Y2K	2000	2000
Max Raimi	Viola Quintet	1999	1999
Scott Lindroth	String Quartet	1997	1997
Mark Kuss	American Triptych	1996	1996
Zhou Long	Poems of Tang	1995	1995
Kevin Scott	String Quartet	1995	1995
David Froom	Sixth String Quartet	1995	1995
Donald Wheelock	Fourth String Quartet	1993	1993
Stephen Jaffe	First Quartet	1991	1991
G. Theodore Wiprud	String Quartet No. 1 Refining Fire	1991	1991
Kenneth Frazelle	String Quartet	1990	1990
Donald Wheelock	Third String Quartet	1990	1990
R. Michael Dougherty	Southern Landscapes	1989	1989
Michael Ching	String Quartet No. 2	1988	1988

== Recordings ==
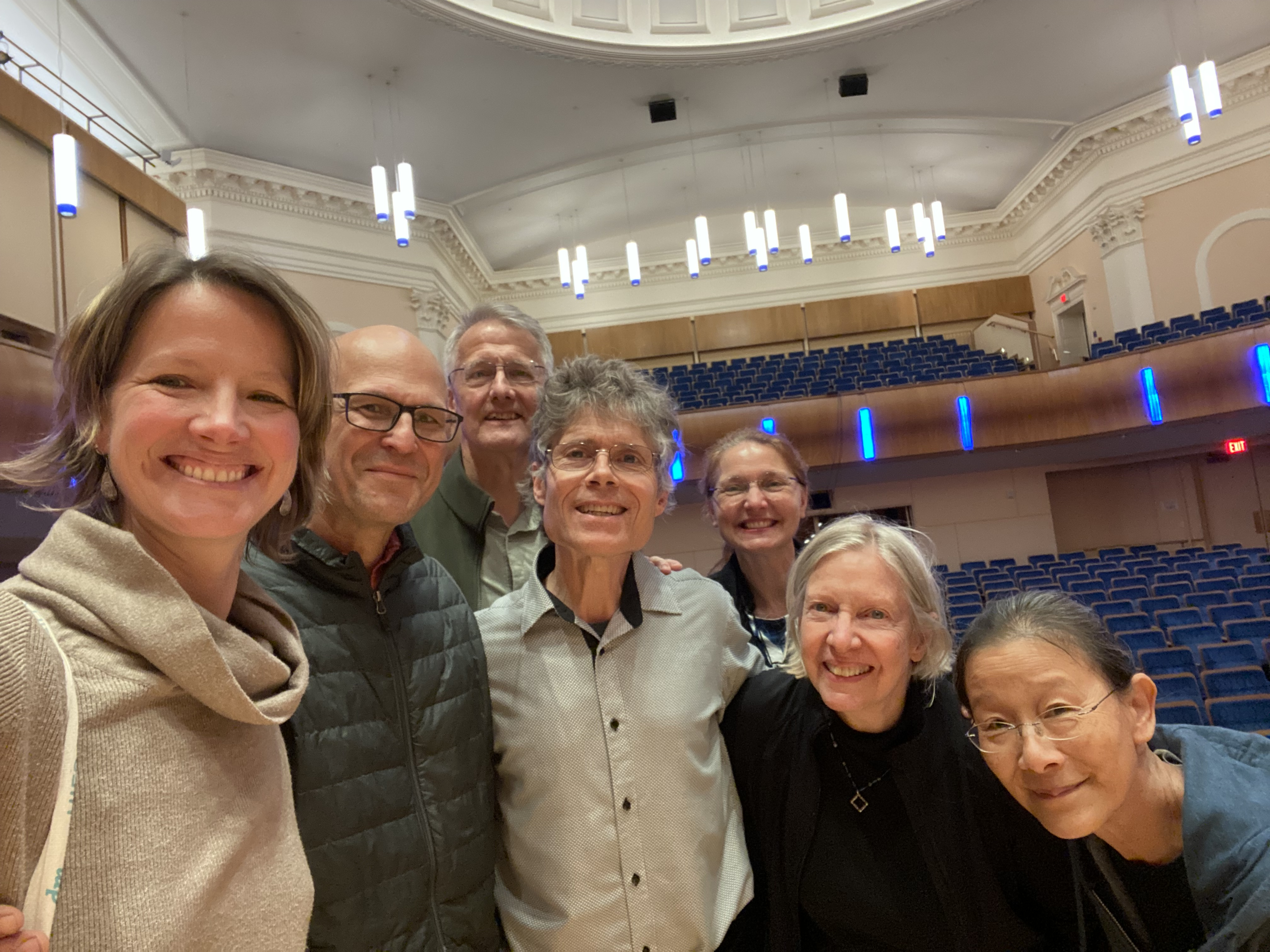
Ciompi with composer Stephen Jaffe, saxophonist Susan Fancher, and producer Judith Sherman during the recording sessions for A Duke Moment

- 1992 - The Ciompi Quartet: Frank Bridge, Ludwig von Beethoven; Sheffield Lab
- 1993 - American Works for String Quartet: Aaron Copland, Robert Ward and Stephen Jaffe, Albany Records
- 1994 - The Ciompi Quartet plays Donald Wheelock, Albany Records
- 2003 - Melancholie: Paul Hindemith, Earl Kim, Arvo Pärt and Ralph Vaughan Williams, Albany Records
- 2006 - Live at St. Stephens: Joseph Haydn, Sergei Prokofiev and Maurice Ravel, Ciompi Release
- 2011 - Tales From Chelm | Memoirs: Paul Schoenfield; Milken Archive Digital
- 2013 - Complete Music by Heinrich Wilhelm Ernst, Volume 4; Toccata Classics
- 2015 - Journeys: Journey to the West by Hsu, Chiayu; Naxos
- 2017 - Mosaic - EP: Joel Feigin
- 2025 - A Duke Moment: Anthony Kelley, Stephen Jaffe and Scott Lindroth; New Focus Recordings

PLEASE NOTE: Ciompi Quartet Provided the Source for Recording List

== At Home and Abroad ==
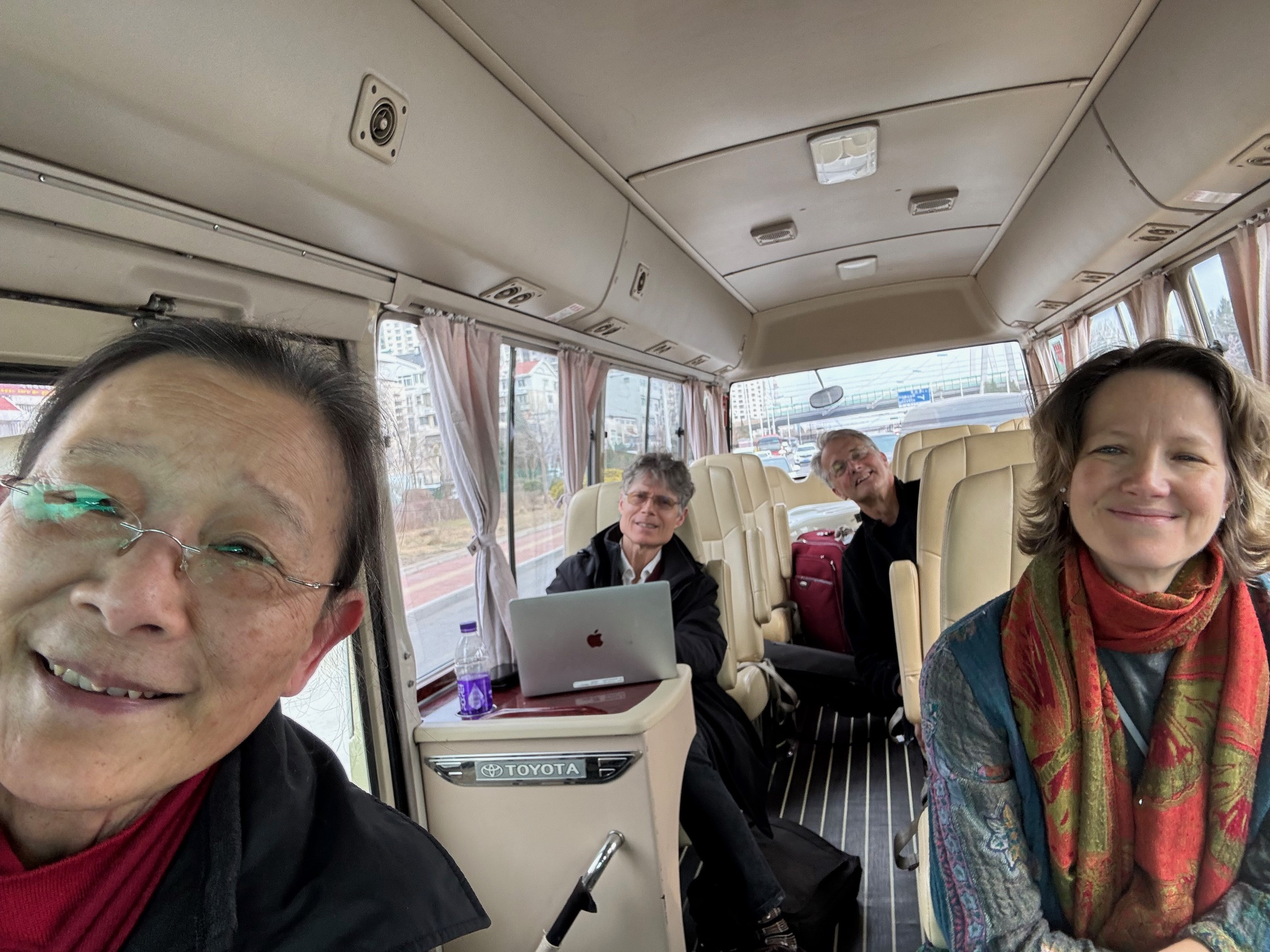
On Tour - China, 2025

The Ciompi Quartet has consistently worked to maintain its presence and impact as both a local and an international ensemble. The quartet has held impactful local residencies, like the one at the Duke University Medical Center beginning in 1980, supported by a grant from Chamber Music America. The quartet has also toured extensively throughout the world, including a 2025 tour to China as both performing artists and guest teachers.

== Legacy and Impact ==
The Ciompi Quartet has maintained a continuous presence at Duke University for decades, serving not just as performers but as educators and mentors. Their long-term commissioning of new works has enriched the string quartet repertoire, particularly from composers associated with Duke.

Critics often praise the ensemble for its warm, unified sound, technical excellence, and intelligent programming. Their blend of traditional and modern music, and their dedication to both performance and pedagogy, make them a significant force in American chamber music.
