= H-Hour: World's Elite =

- Developer: SOF Studios
- Publisher: SOF Studios
- Composer: Penka Kouneva
- Engine: Unreal Engine 4
- Platforms: Microsoft Windows, PlayStation 4
- Release: Microsoft Windows; February 17, 2020; PlayStation 4; cancelled
- Genre: Tactical shooter
- Mode: Multiplayer

H-Hour: World's Elite was a tactical shooter video game, that was developed by SOF Studios. The game released in early access for Microsoft Windows via Steam in May 2015. A version for the PlayStation 4 was planned to be released at a later date.

Initial development was mostly funded by $252,500 from a successful Kickstarter campaign in July 2013.

== Gameplay ==
H-Hour's gameplay takes heavy inspiration from the SOCOM series, to which the developers describe the game as a "spiritual successor". The game is intended to be best when played with a clan and organised teams, and aims to give players a realistic military combat experience.

The game will initially be "8v8" only, with the possibility of testing and adding larger player-counts in the future. Upon release the game will be multiplayer only.

H-Hour: World's Elite is planned to include six maps upon release and at least four gameplay modes. Additional community maps are planned to be supported.

== Development ==
H-Hour: World's Elite is being developed by SOF Studios, located in Southern Pines, North Carolina. Its creative director, David Sears, was also the creative director of the SOCOM series, and H Hour is envisaged as a spiritual successor. The game was announced alongside a Kickstarter crowdfunding campaign in July 2013 which aimed to raise $200,000, ultimately raising $252,662. These funds were used to create a prototype which could then be used as a pitch for publisher funding. In April 2014, Sears posted a blog about difficulties in funding the project, later leaving his position as creative director at SOF Studios in October 2014.

Initial development and assets were created using Unreal Engine 3 and later transitioned to Unreal Engine 4. The game is being developed for Microsoft Windows, with plans to port the game to the PlayStation 4. The game was entered into Steam Greenlight in March 2014, approved in April, and released onto Steam Early Access in May 2015.

As of March 14, 2016, all development on H-Hour: World's Elite was ceased awaiting further capital investment.

As of March 21, 2016, a group of industry professionals including former contract workers at SOF Studios stepped forward to volunteer their spare time to continuing the development of 'H-Hour: World's Elite. Between then and the end of June 2016, several improvements were completed. The game entered a beta phase in March 2018, alongside an announcement that the PlayStation 4 version was under development.

As of August 2023, the SOF Studios website is no longer online and no updates have been made to the game in several years.

As of September 29, 2023, the game was removed from Steam at the request of the developer, which had ceased operations.
