= Jeanne Behrend =

American classical composer

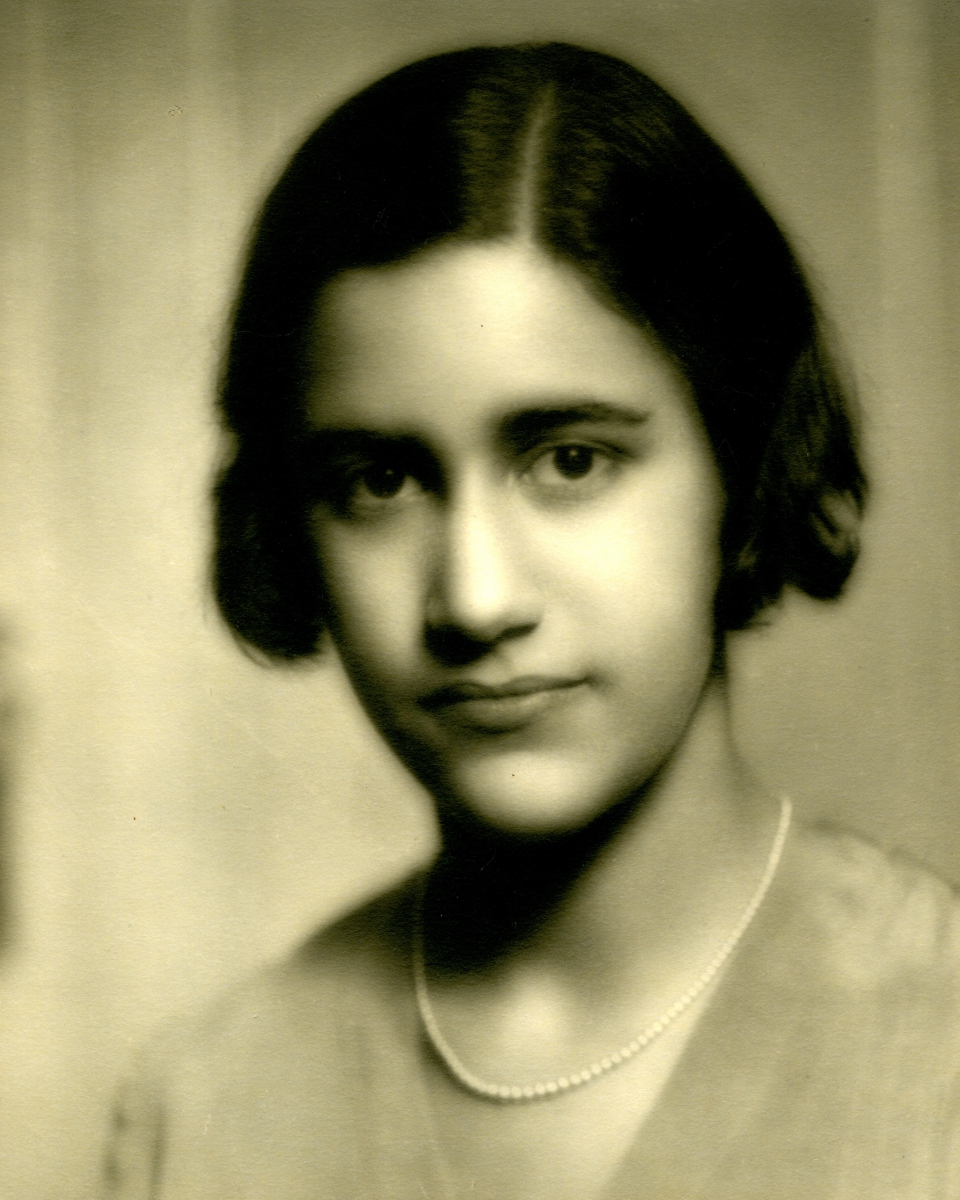
- Jeanne Behrend

Background information
- Born: May 11, 1911; Philadelphia, Pennsylvania, U.S.
- Died: March 20, 1988 (aged 76) Philadelphia, Pennsylvania, U.S.
- Education: Curtis Institute of Music
- Genres: Classical
- Occupations: Pianist; Composer; Musicologist; Music educator
- Instrument: Piano
- Years active: 1922–88
- Spouses: Alexander Kelberine (m. 1934; d. 1940); George S. McManus (m. 1949; d. 1967)
- Awards: Joseph H. Bearns Prize (1936); Order of the Southern Cross (1965)

Jeanne Behrend (May 11, 1911 – March 20, 1988) was an American pianist, musicologist, music educator, and composer.

She made her debut with the Philadelphia Orchestra at age 11, and graduated from the Curtis Institute of Music in 1934 after studying under Josef Hofmann and Rosario Scalero. Behrend won Columbia University's Joseph H. Bearns Prize in 1936. Following her 1937 Carnegie Hall debut, she championed American composers and explored musical traditions across the Western Hemisphere.

Sponsored by composer Heitor Villa-Lobos, she conducted lecture and concert tours across South America from 1945-46, for which she earned Brazil's National Order of the Southern Cross. As a musicologist and archival editor, Behrend published Louis Moreau Gottschalk's autobiography, Notes of a Pianist, in 1964. She taught at several institutions, including Juilliard, Temple University, and the Curtis Institute of Music.

== Early life ==
Jeanne Behrend was an American Jewish pianist and composer. She was born May 11, 1911, in Philadelphia, Pennsylvania.

== Music career and advocacy ==
Behrend made her orchestral debut with the Philadelphia Orchestra in 1922 at 11 years old. She graduated from the Curtis Institute of Music in 1934, where she studied piano with Josef Hofmann and composition with Rosario Scalero.

Behrend won Columbia University's Joseph H. Bearns Prize in 1936. She made her Carnegie Hall debut in 1937, playing one of her own original compositions. She then joined the faculty at the Curtis Institute of Music, where she taught from 1937 to 1944.

She also worked as a pianist and composer, and taught music at the Juilliard School in New York City, the Philadelphia Conservatory of Music, and Temple University. Becoming aware of the lack of opportunity for American composers, Behrend became a champion of American music, focusing part of her performances on showcasing American works, and concentrated on her career as a performer.

=== Editorial work and musicology ===
Behrend edited a selection of 19th-century composer Louis Moreau Gottschalk piano scores, and his autobiography, Notes of a Pianist, in 1964. She also edited a collection of composer Stephen Foster's songs. and one of traditional American choral fuguing tunes.

=== International tours ===
Behrend was recommended for sponsorship by Brazilian composer Heitor Villa-Lobos. Under this sponsorship, she toured giving lectures and concerts in South America from 1945-46.

She founded and directed the Philadelphia Festival of Western Hemisphere Music in 1959 and 1960. Behrend was honored by the government of Brazil with its National Order of the Southern Cross.

== Personal life ==
Behrend married twice. Her first husband, fellow pianist and frequent performance partner Alexander Kelberine whom she married in 1934, died at 35 years of age in 1940. She married her second husband, Americana book dealer George S. McManus, in 1949; he died in 1967. Behrend spent her final years in her hometown, dying in Philadelphia on March 20, 1988.

Behrend's personal research collection, musical manuscripts, and historical papers are permanently archived at the Free Library of Philadelphia.

== Works ==
Behrend's compositions span orchestral suites, chamber music, songs, vocal cantatas, and pedagogical piano literature.

=== Orchestral and vocal ===
- From Dawn to Dusk (1939) – An orchestral suite that won the Joseph H. Bearns Prize from Columbia University.
- Festival Fanfare: Prelude to the National Anthem (1959) – Composed for large ensemble brass and percussion.
- Lazarus – A dramatic cantata scored for mixed chorus and orchestra.

=== Chamber music ===
- String Quartet – Premiered during her early residency programs.
- Lamentation (1944) – A sonorous piece scored for viola and pianoforte.

=== Piano solo ===
- The Old Scissors Grinder (1926) – A novelty piece composed at age 14 and performed in London by her teacher, Josef Hofmann.
- Quiet Piece (1932) – Written during her undergraduate studies at the Curtis Institute of Music.
- Dance into Spring – An uptempo programmatic piano work frequently used in her concert recitals.
- Country Jig in D major – A virtuosic short piece that Behrend recorded for historical piano anthologies.
- A Child's Day – A multi-movement pedagogical piano suite designed for intermediate-level instruction.

Behrend edited Louis Moreau Gottschalk's Notes of a Pianist (New York, 1964) and also selections of his music.

== See also ==
- Joseph H. Bearns Prize
- List of twentieth-century classical composers
