= David Freedman (disambiguation) =

David Freedman (1898–1936) was a Romanian-born American playwright and biographer.

David Freedman may also refer to:

- David Freedman (cricketer) (born 1964), Australian first-class cricketer
- David Noel Freedman (1922–2008), biblical scholar and author
- David A. Freedman (1938–2008), American professor of statistics
- David Freedman (screenwriter) (born 1965), writer and co creator of The Mr Hell Show
- David J. Freedman, neuroscientist (University of Chicago)

== See also ==
- David Friedman (disambiguation)
- David Freeman (disambiguation)
