= Scott Lindroth =

American composer

Scott Allen Lindroth (born 1958) is an American composer and teacher based near Durham, North Carolina.

Lindroth joined the faculty of Duke University in 1990, where he is the Vice-Provost for the Arts and the Kevin D. Gorter Associate Professor of Music; his colleagues at Duke include composers Stephen Jaffe, John Supko, and Anthony Kelley. Lindroth teaches undergraduate courses in music theory, composition, and electronic music, as well as graduate seminars on composition-related topics. In the spring of 1995, Lindroth served as Visiting Assistant Professor of Music at Princeton University.

Born in Cincinnati, Ohio, and raised near Fond du Lac, Wisconsin, Lindroth holds D.M.A. and M.M. degrees in Composition from the Yale University School of Music, and a B.M. degree in Composition from the Eastman School of Music.

Lindroth’s music has been commissioned and performed by ensembles such as the Chicago Symphony Orchestra, New York Philharmonic, Philadelphia Orchestra, and the Ciompi Quartet. Recordings of his music are available on the CRI, Equilibrium, and Centaur labels.
