= Joseph H. Bearns Prize =

American music award

The Joseph H. Bearns Prize in Music was established on February 3, 1921, through a bequest by Lillia M. Bearns in memory of her father, Joseph H. Bearns. The purpose of the prize is to encourage and financially support talented young composers in the United States.

Administered by Columbia University, the prize is open to United States citizens between 18 and 25 years old. The competition is divided into two categories: larger-form works, such as orchestral and choral compositions, and smaller-form works, including solos, quartets, and sextets. The Joseph H. Bearns Prize is one of the most significant awards granted to emerging young American composers, and in 2006, it amounted to $7,200.

== Past winners ==
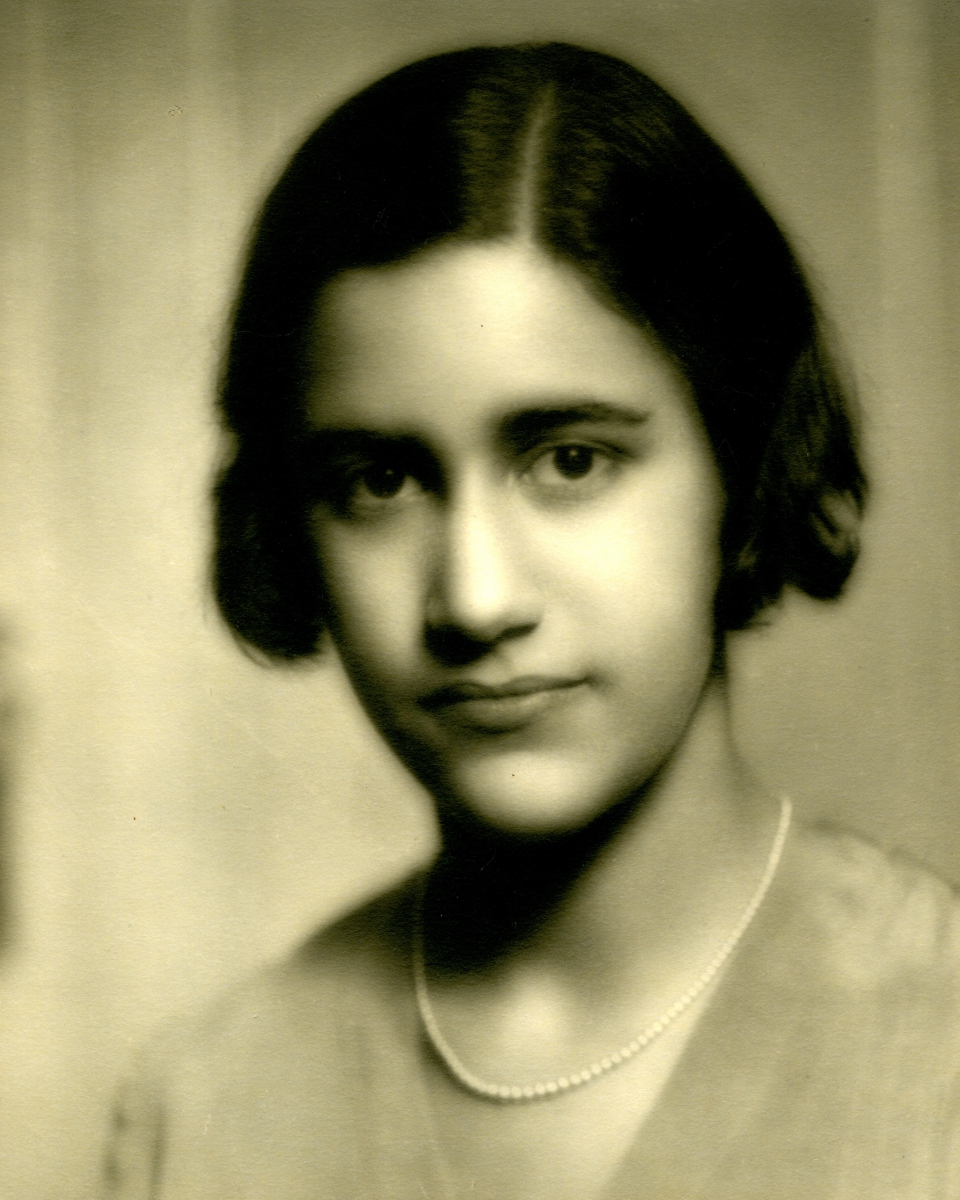
Jeanne Behrend

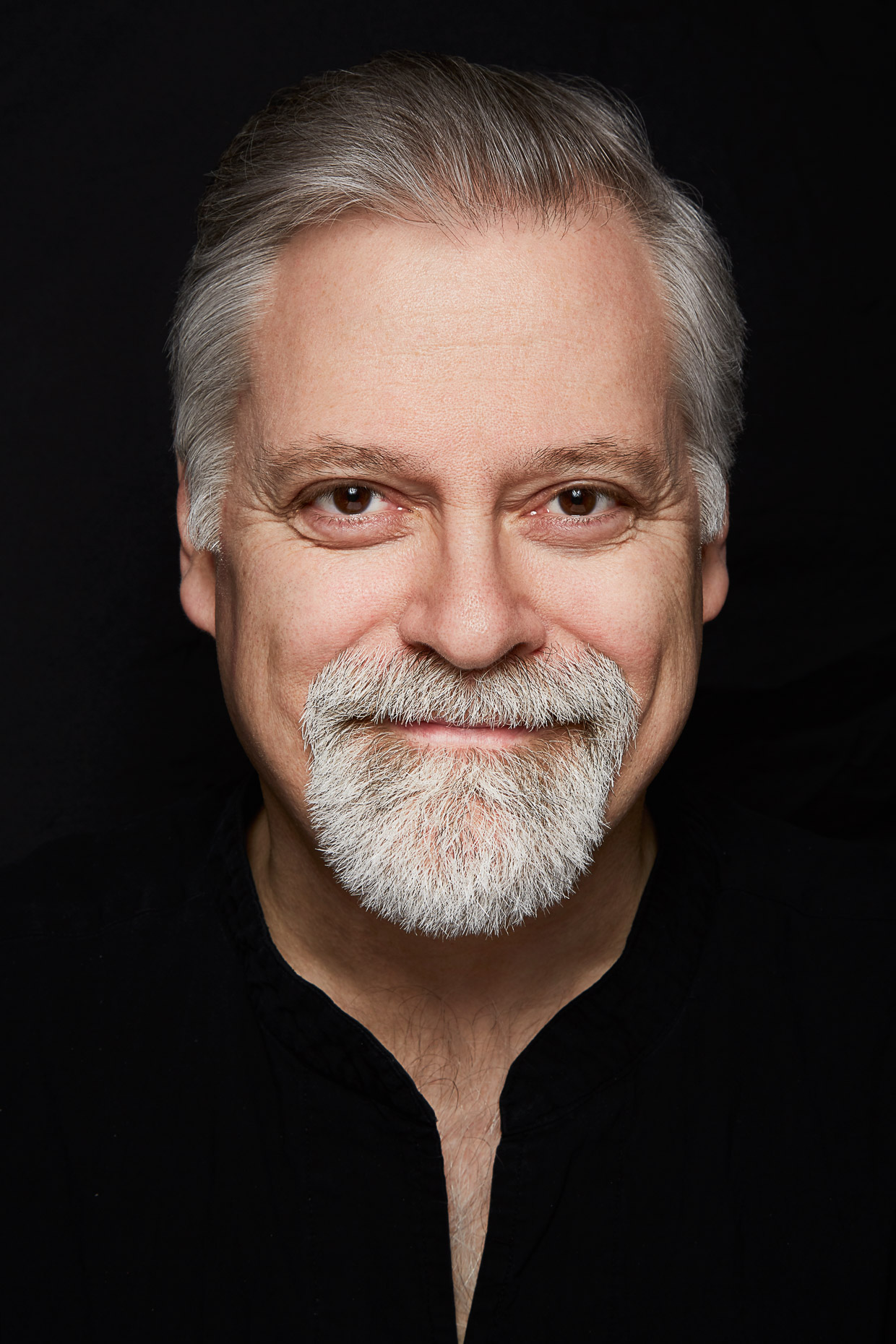
Daron Hagen

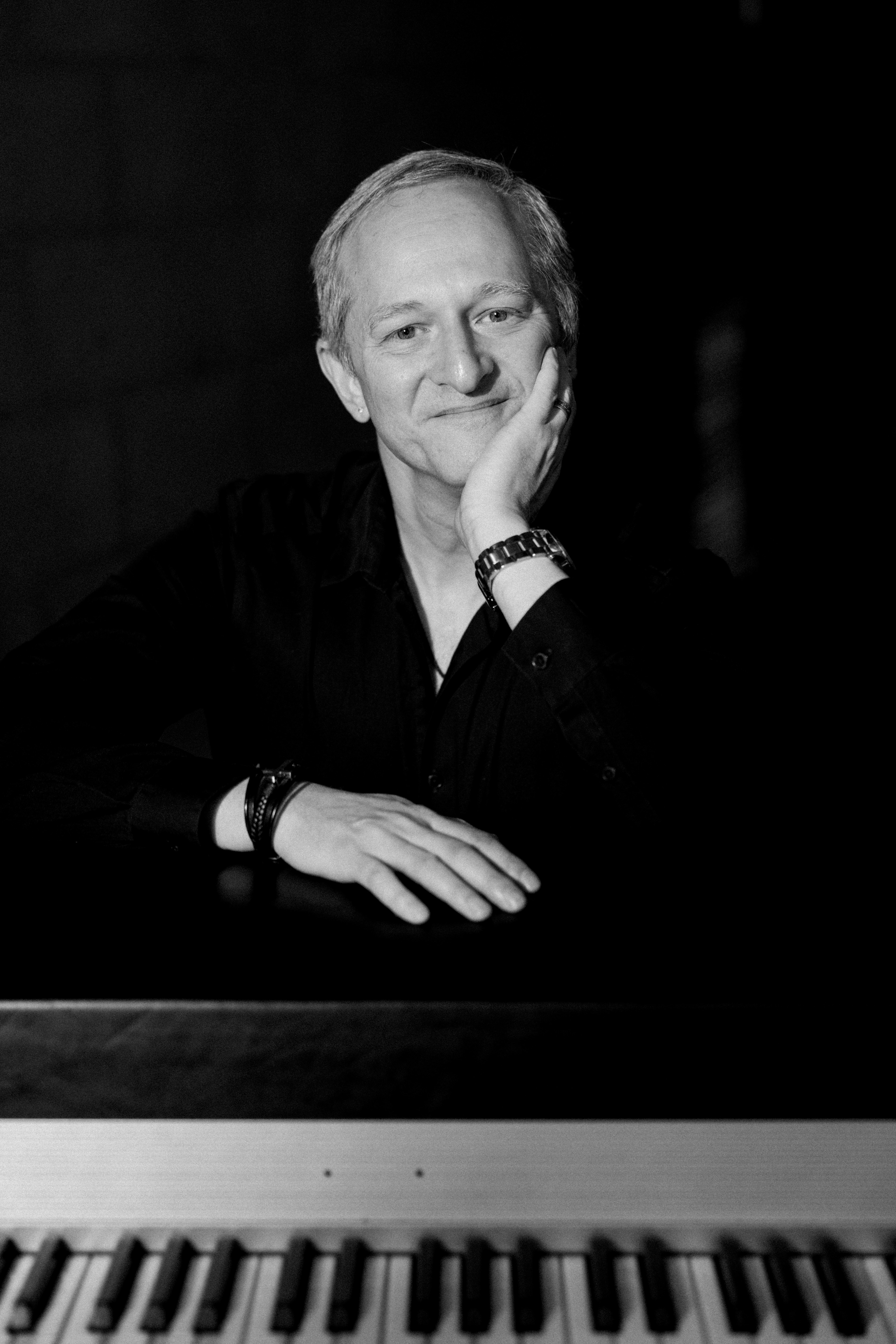
Kenneth Lampl

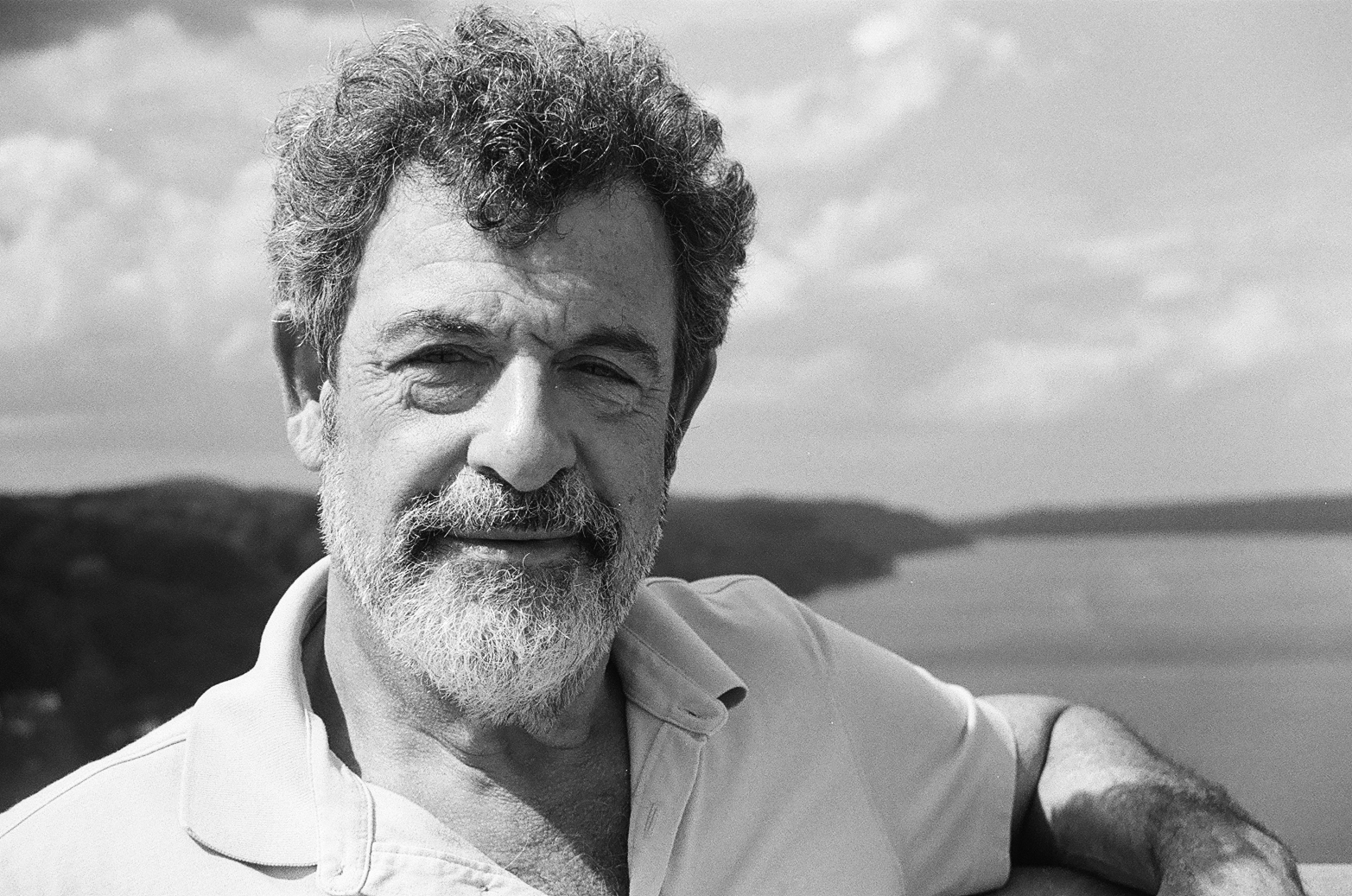
Tobias Picker

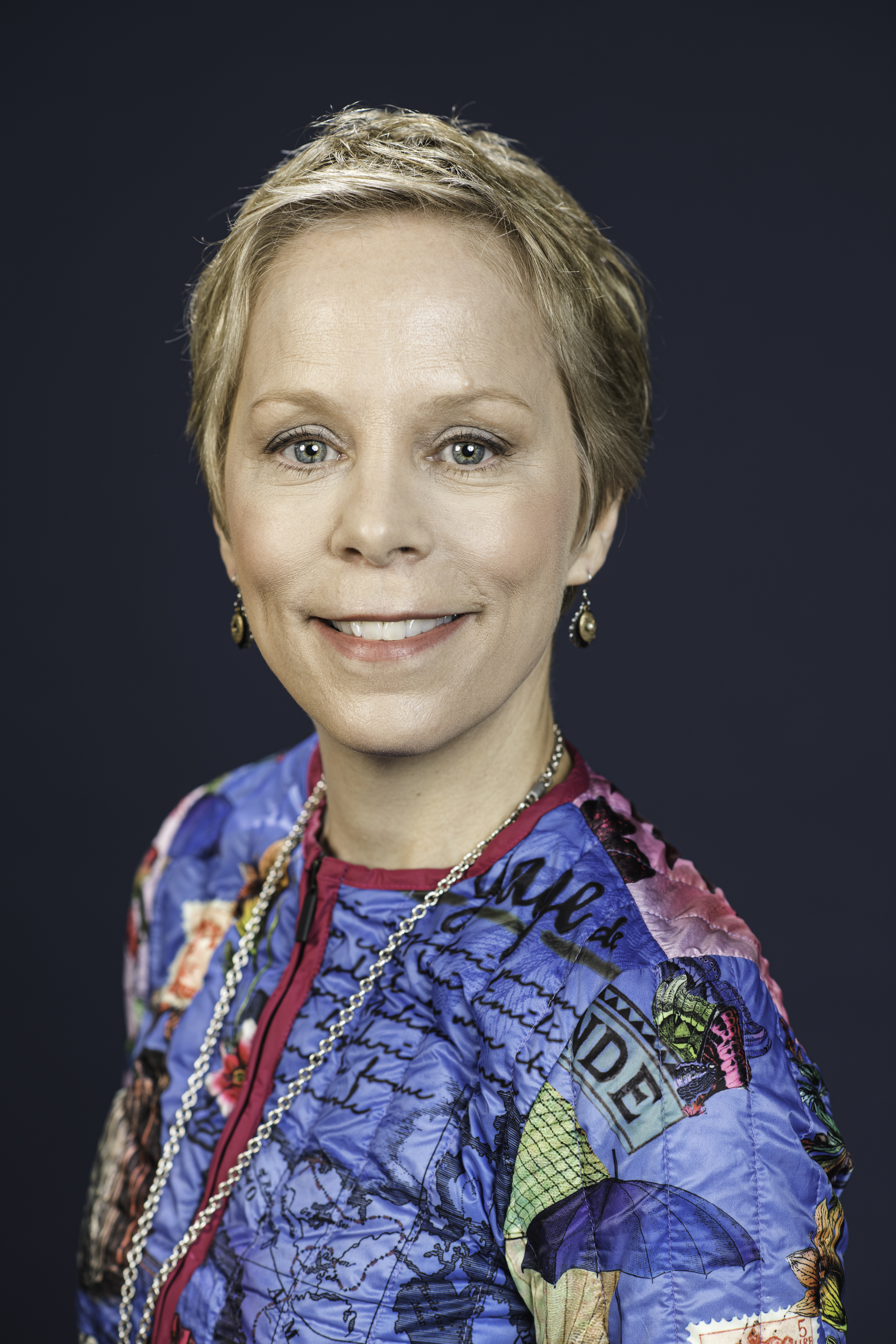
Augusta Read Thomas

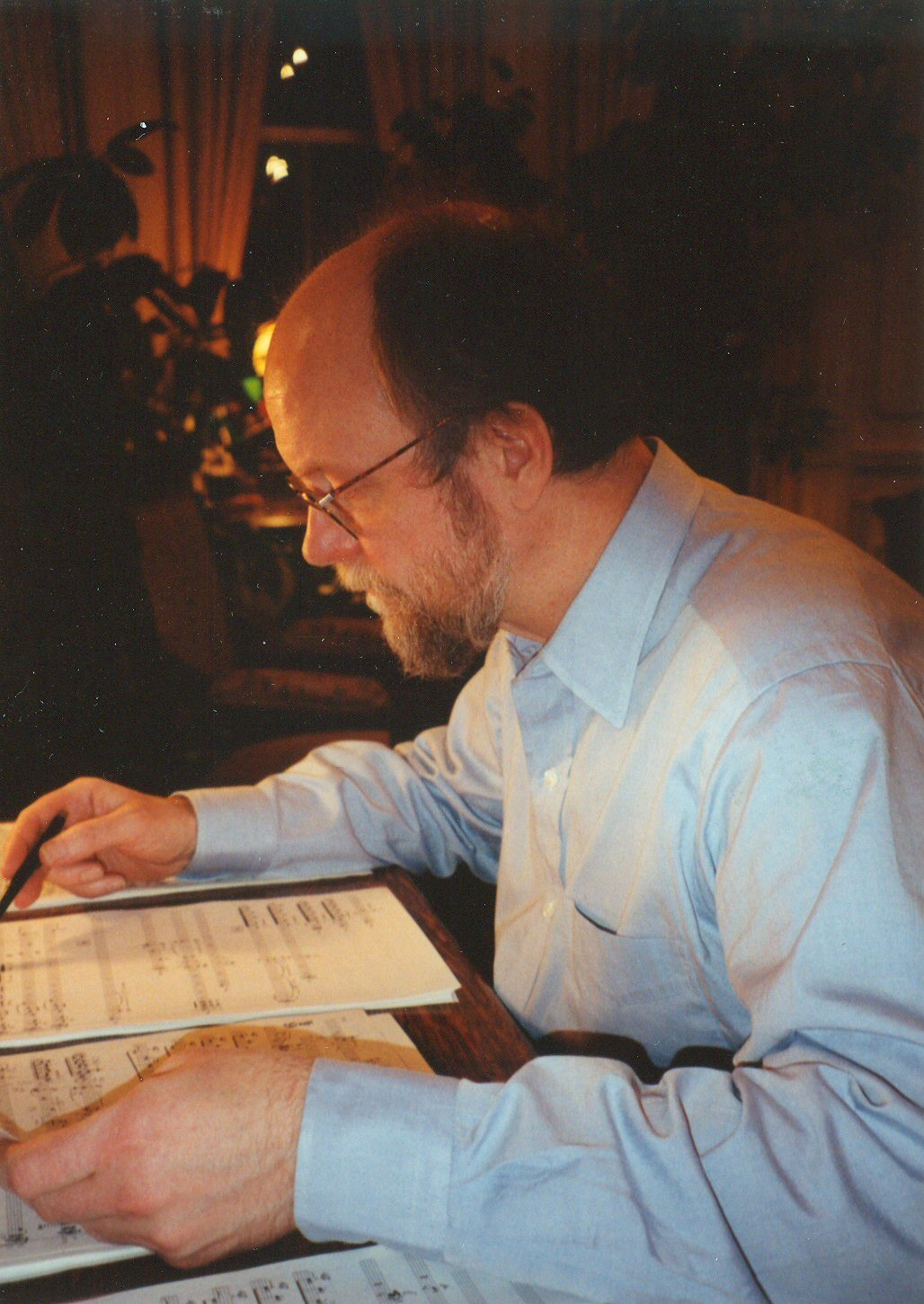
Charles Wuorinen

- Milton Babbitt (1941, for Music for the Mass)
- Christopher Bailey (for Six Songs on Poems of John Monroe)
- Samuel Barber (1929, for Violin Sonata, and 1933, for School for Scandal Overture)
- Jeanne Behrend (1936)
- William Bergsma
- Stephen Cabell (2004, for Cosmicomic)
- Ronald Caltabiano (1981, 1983)
- Carlos R. Carrillo Cotto (1993, for Cantares)
- William Coble
- Glen Cortese
- Alvin Curran
- Richard Danielpour (1982)
- Mario Davidovsky
- Jonathan Dawe
- Charles Dodge
- Emily Doolittle (1997, for Weather Songs)
- Michael Eckert
- Renee Favand (1995, for Orpheus. Eurydice. Hermes.)
- Mark Gustavson (1983, for Textures of Time)
- Daron Hagen (1985, for Trio Concertante)
- Mark Hagerty
- Kevin Hanlon
- William Harvey (for Cuerpo Garrido)
- Joel Hoffman (composer) (1975, for Variations for violin, cello, and harp)
- Stephen Jaffe (1976, for Four Nocturnes)
- Pierre Jalbert
- Evan Johnson (2006)
- Brooke Joyce (1999)
- Louis Karchin
- Aaron Jay Kernis (1984)
- Kenneth Lampl (1991)
- David Lang (1983)
- Paul Lansky (1964)
- Anne LeBaron (1978)
- Roland Leich (1933 for Housman Songs and 1937 for String Quartet)
- Leonard Mark Lewis (1999)
- Steven Mackey
- Shafer Mahoney
- Paul Moravec
- Lynn David Newton (1965, for Sonata for Piano)
- Paul Nordoff (1933, for Piano Concerto)
- Joshua Penman (2004, for Aevum)
- Daniel Perlongo (for Seven Pieces)
- Tobias Picker (1977)
- James Primosch (1981)
- Adam Ragusea (2004, for Jiahu)
- David Rakowski (1984, for Violin Concerto)
- Berenice Robinson (1932)
- Jason Roth (1995, for Second String Quartet)
- Jake Rundall (2006)
- Eric W. Sawyer (1987)
- Carl Schimmel (1999, for Capa Cocha)
- Joseph Schwantner (1967)
- Harold Shapero (1946, for Symphony for String Orchestra)
- Alexander Sigman (2006)
- Lani Smith (co-winner, 1958) for "Prelude and Scherzo for Brass, Timpani and Strings"
- David Soley
- Anthony Strilko
- Louise Talma (1932)
- Bruce Taub (1971, for Variations 11.7.3.3.4)
- Reynold Tharp (1996, for Drift)
- Christopher Theofanidis
- Augusta Read Thomas
- Richard Toensing
- Christopher Trapani
- Benjamin Vanden Heuvel (2018)
- Dan Visconti
- David Ward-Steinman (1959, for Symphony)
- Hugo Weisgall
- Richard Willis (for Symphony No. 1)
- Cynthia Lee Wong (2004, for Fates and Furies)
- Maurice Wright (1974)
- Charles Wuorinen (1958, 1959, and 1961)
