= David Freeman (solicitor) =

British solicitor (1928–2015)

David John Freeman (25 February 1928 – 23 February 2015) was a British solicitor who founded the law firm D J Freeman, which grew from a one man firm in 1952 to a leading London law firm.

== Early life ==
David John Freeman was born on 25 February 1928, in Cardiff, Wales. His father was in the tailoring business. The family moved to London in 1933. He attended Christ's College, Finchley, a grammar school, and after having served in the army as a 2nd Lieutenant from 1946 to 1948, he qualified as a solicitor in 1952 and started his own practice, D J Freeman.

== Legal career ==
Freeman built his one-man firm up to a leading London firm, with 53 partners and 250 employees by the time of his retirement as senior partner in 1992. The firm practised commercial property, insurance and media work. Freeman was known for high-profile insolvency, including the State Building Society crash in 1959, the John Bloom/ Rolls Razor case through the mid-1960s, and the Robert Maxwell DTI inquiry in 1970. Freeman advised in the liquidation of Barlow Clowes in 1987. In the Secondary Banks crisis of 1974, he worked on several rescues, including Hambro’s rescue of Vavasseur, the Stern Administration, the Ronald Lyon Administration, and the Israel British Bank collapse. In 1974 he advised then-Prime Minister Harold Wilson on libel. In 1977 he was appointed a Department of Trade Inspector into AEG Telefunken (UK) ltd and Credit Collections Ltd, the first practising solicitor, rather than a QC, to be so appointed. After retiring in 1992, Freeman remained a consultant at DJ Freeman until 2003. The firm is now known as Locke Lord LLP after a series of mergers.

== Other activities ==
Freeman was a secular Jew. He was a trustee of Ravenswood (now Norwood) Children's Home, a governor of Carmel College, he sat on the defence committee of the Jewish Board of Deputies in the 1960s, and was a founder member of JACOB (now the Community Security Trust). He was a governor of the RSC (1975–1996) and of the Mermaid Theatre. In 2000, he was Chairman of the Trustees and of the Executive Committee of the Holocaust Conference "Remembering for the Future", Oxford University. In 2005–2006, he was chairman of "An Inquiry into the Provenance of 654 Aramaic incantation bowls" for University College, London (UCL). In 2006–2008, he was chairman of "An inquiry into the legal, ethical, and professional considerations involved in the acquisition and receipt of cultural property in UCL." In 2007. Freeman built a children's centre, The Freeman Family Centre, for Barnardo's, in the London Borough of Brent.

== Personal life ==
He married Iris Alberge (1927–1997), an educational psychologist, in 1950. She became a partner in his law firm in 1967, after qualifying as a solicitor. Subsequently, she wrote the authorised biography of the distinguished Master of the Rolls, Lord Denning. There are three children of the marriage, and 12 grandchildren. In 2001 Freeman married Connie Levy.

He died on 23 February 2015.
