= David Freeman (business owner) =

Australian business owner (born 1984)

- Born: David George Freeman; 18 June 1984 (age 42); Sydney, Australia
- Occupations: Business owner, entrepreneur, skydiver and coconut specialist

David George Freeman (born 18 June 1984 in Australia) is an Australian business owner, entrepreneur, skydiver and coconut specialist. His most well-known venture has been the creation of the FMCG brand H2coco, known for its three product lines; H2coco Coconut Water, H2Coconut Oil and Cocoespresso.

Freeman illustrated his passion to become an entrepreneur at an early stage, his first business venture was a small marketing & events company which led him to develop an interest in the Sydney hospitality industry where he was offered the opportunity to invest into several bars and restaurants. He also started to develop an interest in construction through working with a project manager learning that management; development & leadership became his key strengths.

Freeman started to research the development of H2Coco in 2009 and launched the brand in 2010, having won various awards for its innovative approach to FMCG.

== Early life ==
Freeman was born in Sydney, Australia, the middle child of three children of Georgina McLoughlin (Born 4 April 1957), a former Sydney socialist, and George Freeman (22 January 1935 – 20 March 1990), a well-known underworld figure and career criminal.

Freeman was educated at Scots College, an elite prep school in Rose Bay, Sydney. He then continued to study Architecture at St George College but left without completing the course.

He has a brother named Adam who in 2014 was jailed for 5 years for his role in a large scale drug operation.

== Career ==
=== Hospitality businesses ===
The Backroom Sydney

In April 2011, Freeman entered a joint venture with friend Raul Gonzales to open a 1950s-style basement bar, loosely modelled on chic New York City hotspots with hopes to change the face of the Kings Cross – and greater Sydney – through his venture.

Sealed behind an Acme Bookstore facade on the Kings Cross strip The Backroom was a venue designed for a clientele – those aware of its existence. 1950s film noir influences the interior aesthetic with the detective and the femme fatale characters within the designed space. According to interior designer Kristie Paul of inochi design studio, David had a long list of ideas.

The Backroom was host to a series of international superstars, with names as big as Calvin Harris, Snoop Dogg and Justin Bieber partying there and the likes of Brodinski and Rudimental stopping by for impromptu late night sets.

In September 2014, seven months after the NSW Government implemented their controversial lockout legislation, The Backroom Sydney, were forced to close its doors.

=== Coconut ventures ===
Lara Bingle was brand ambassador in 2012 and 2013.

Kyle Sandilands is a key investor in H2Coco Pty Ltd.

== Awards ==
- David Freeman was named Young Entrepreneur of the Year at the 2014 Australian Small Business Champion Awards, having gained national ranging in key pharmacy franchise.
- Finalist: Employer of the year by Food Magazine Awards in July 2015, also Finalist for 3 awards
- Specialised Small Business by Australian Small Business Awards in April 2016 by the Australian Small Business Champion Awards
- Exporter of the Year by Optus MyBusiness Awards in August 2015 – Exporter of the years at the Optus My Business awards
- Finalist: the Best Local Venue by City Of Sydney Small Business Awards in June 2012
- Best Growth Strategy by My Business Magazine in September 2013
- H2Coco has established itself as an industry leader with its premium coconut-based products, the trending non-alcoholic beverage choice for 2015.
- H2Coco was named the Best New Product of 2012 in the AdNews 2013 Annual Edition.
- Finalist: Best NSW Small Business Award by Telstra Business Awards in July 2015 were Finalist in the 2015 Telstra Business Awards
