= David Freeman (journalist) =

- Born: David Freeman; 1959 (age 66–67); Pine Bluff, Arkansas
- Education: Yale University
- Occupations: Journalist, author

David W. Freeman (born 1959) is editorial director of NBC News Mach, which AdWeek described pre-launch as 'a new tech, science and innovation vertical'.

== Career ==
Freeman earned a bachelor's degree in English and Journalism from Yale University in 1981. Since November 2016, Freeman has been editorial director, MACH (science, tech & innovation) at NBCNews.com in New York City. Before that he had worked for Huffington Post (December 2011 to November 2016) as Senior Science Editor, Managing Editor of CBS Interactive's Health Channel (June 2010 – December 2011, SmartmanDaily (2007 through December 2010), as a writer for WebMD (2009 to 2010), as freelance writer/editor for New Hope Media (2005 to Jun 2007), as editorial team manager for consumer magazines, Adoptive Families and ADDitude Magazine, and as editorial director for Boardroom, Inc. (January 1995 through May 2004).

He has won several awards and fellowships for his work, including 2017 AACR June L. Biedler Prize for Cancer Journalism from the American Association for Cancer Research. In Spring 2017, Freeman was named a Harvard Medical School Media Fellow for scientific and biomedical research writing.
