= The Greatest Generation (podcast) =

Comedy podcast

- Genre: Comedy

Cast and voices
- Hosted by: Adam Pranica; Benjamin Ahr Harrison

Music
- Opening theme: See list: The Picard Song by Darkmateria (episodes 1–178, 621–present); DS9 Intro Theme by Adam Ragusea/Darkmateria (179–351); The Janeway Song (DO IT) by Adam Ragusea (352–522); Faith of the Fart by Ben Harrison & Adam Pranica feat. Adam Ragusea (523–620)
- Ending theme: The Picard Song by Darkmateria

Production
- Length: 50-75 min.

Publication
- No. of episodes: 632 (as of July 12, 2026)
- Original release: January 25, 2016
- Provider: Uxbridge-Shimoda LLC
- Updates: Weekly (Mondays)

Related
- Website: https://uxbridgeshimoda.com/

The Greatest Generation is a weekly comedy Star Trek podcast hosted by Adam Pranica and Benjamin Harrison. The show's tagline is "A Star Trek podcast by two guys who are a little bit embarrassed to have a Star Trek Podcast."

The show started on January 25, 2016, and after 30 episodes joined the Maximum Fun network on May 9, 2016. Pranica and Harrison left Maximum Fun in May 2026, with their shows now being distributed by their own company, Uxbridge-Shimoda LLC. The show, as of August 2018, is the highest-rated Star Trek podcast on iTunes.

== History and format ==
From January 2016 to September 2017 the podcast was posted twice-weekly (on Mondays and Wednesdays), with each show reviewing an episode of Star Trek: The Next Generation (where the podcast gets its name). After completing its run of The Next Generation, the show switched to once a week (Mondays) and moved on to review episodes of Star Trek: Deep Space Nine in October 2017, Star Trek: Voyager in February 2021, and Star Trek: Enterprise in May 2024.

The podcast has a number of running gags, such as referring to the listeners as "viewers" and Pranica and Harrison parodying This Old House or impersonating the character of Kevin Uxbridge (played by John Anderson) from The Next Generation episode "The Survivors".

Fans of The Greatest Generation are collectively referred to as the Friends of DeSoto (FODs).

=== Maron open and review ===
Every show starts with a Maron Open (named after comedian Marc Maron's podcast, WTF with Marc Maron). There are a few standard opening segments including opening trading cards, reading fan mail, or "Bible Study" (where they open up the show bible and compare the plan for the show to its eventual execution). The opening for episode 152 (which was published on July 10, 2017 and reviewed "Descent, part II") featured Pranica and Harrison interviewing LeVar Burton, who portrayed Lt. Commander Geordi La Forge in The Next Generation.

Following the Maron Open, Pranica and Harrison give a walk-through of the selected Star Trek episode scene by scene, followed by a review. Pranica and Harrison, both of whom have professional video production experience, use their knowledge of cinematography to provide commentary on the show, offering insight into some of the aspects of Star Trek while also pointing out some of the areas where it could be better. Using their experience, they critique the show's sets, special effects, acting, hairstyles, writing, and directing.

=== Drunk Shimoda ===
During the initial run of The Next Generation, Deep Space Nine, Voyager, and Enterprise, after reviewing the episode, Pranica and Harrison would designate their "Drunk Shimoda" for that episode, which is the character or actor (or in some cases TV crew member) having the most fun or just being the silliest in the episode.

The term "Drunk Shimoda" is a reference to the second episode of Star Trek: The Next Generation, "The Naked Now," in which assistant chief engineer Jim Shimoda is inebriated by a virus and removes all of the isolinear chips from the engine control station.

The Greatest Discovery/Greatest Trek would continue this feature, where it was renamed the "Edward Larkin", in reference to H. Jon Benjamin's character in the Short Treks episode "The Trouble with Edward". Following the review of season one Star Trek: Prodigy episode "Asylum", it was renamed the "Barniss Frex" for subsequent Prodigy reviews.

=== Episode vetoes ===
At the end of each episode, Harrison reads the preview for the next episode they are to review from Amazon and Netflix. During their reviews of The Next Generation, Pranica and Harrison each had the chance to veto one episode per season of The Next Generation, meaning they would skip that episode and review the one after instead. However, the vetoes could be nullified if the other host chose to use their veto to counter the decision, which is what happened every time the vetoes were used.

In Season 1 Pranica vetoed "Haven" because it featured Lwaxana Troi, but this was nullified by Harrison. In Season 2 Harrison attempted to veto the episode “Up the Long Ladder,” but Pranica nullified as he felt they should watch a low quality episode. In Season 3 Harrison described "The Ensigns of Command" as one of his favorite episodes, leading Pranica to veto it and forcing Harrison to counter-veto. In Season 4 Harrison vetoed “Remember Me", describing it as "a turkey", but Pranica nullified. In Season 5 Harrison attempted to veto “New Ground", incorrectly thinking it featured Lwaxana Troi, but Pranica nullified as he felt Harrison was "vetoing blind". In Season 6 Pranica vetoed "Rascals" (in which four adult characters are turned into 12-year-old children) stating he was "anti-kids", Harrison countered because he liked the episode and thought it needed a second chance. In Season 7 Pranica attempted to veto "Dark Page", again because it featured Lwaxana Troi, but Harrison countered it because he did not have detailed intelligence about the episode.

=== Board game ===
As Pranica and Harrison's knowledge of Deep Space Nine was not as strong as it was for The Next Generation, instead of vetoes, for the last fifteen episodes of the first season of Deep Space Nine, Harrison rolled a virtual die. If they rolled a 1 (out of a potential 1 thru 15), they would have to be drunk for that episode, something they achieved twice.

From the second season onward, Pranica and Harrison created a Snakes and Ladders style board game called "Game of Buttholes: The Will Of the Prophets". At the end of each episode the virtual six-sided die is rolled and Pranica and Harrison advance as many spaces on the board, resulting in either a blank tile (meaning a normal next episode) or an action tile containing a theme for the next episode. There are 100 tiles out of which 76 are blank, 18 are action tiles and 6 are Bajoran Wormholes (meaning they would move to a lower part of the board, the equivalent of snakes in Snakes and Ladders).

The action tile themes are:

- Quark's Bar: A "Drunkisode", where Pranica and Harrison have to be drunk recording the show (9 tiles)
- CoCo NoNo: A tiki-themed Drunkisode
- Mornhammered: Power hour, where Pranica and Harrison have to take a one shot of beer every minute while recording
- Starship Mine: Where Pranica and Harrison have to build a spaceship model while recording the show
- Caught in the Nebula: Where Pranica and Harrison have no notes and cannot scroll through the episode while recording
- The Nth Degree: Where Pranica and Harrison have to undertake extensive research about the episode
- Measure of a Man: Pranica and Harrison flip a coin at the start of the recording and then vehemently argue the pros and cons of the episode depending on the result of the coin toss
- The Naked Now: Pranica and Harrison record the show from their respective bathtubs
- Looking At Each Other During: One host has to fly to the other host's city and record in-person
- Fuck It, We'll Do It Live!: Livestream the recording session

The game was updated when the show moved to Voyager. Now renamed "Game of Buttholes: The Will Of the Caretaker", it featured "Bangers" and "The Traveller" tiles replacing Bajoran Wormholes. "Looking At Each Other During" and "Fuck It, We'll Do It Live" tiles were removed and replaced by:

- His Eyes Uncovered: The hosts must employ ten Tamarian-style metaphors during the episode
- Jay Gordon (later renamed to Naomi Wildman): Each host must make a piece of artwork representing the episode and share it with the other and post pictures
- Neelix's Galley: The hosts drink Talaxian Champagne
- The Caretaker: The Caretaker sends the runabout to a random square on the board

In August 2022, during Voyager's fourth season, the game was updated to add two new tiles:

- Kanar with Damar: Each host attempts to create a cocktail that tastes like Kanar and the other host must try the recipe
- Brone Zone: The hosts must communicate using glorified Vori tellings during the fullness of the episode

The game was significantly updated in May 2024, coinciding with the beginning of Star Trek: Enterprise. Again renamed to "Game of Buttholes: The Will of the Riker: Quantum Leap", vetos were reintroduced within the board game. If both hosts agreed to veto a tile, they were required to record a bonus episode about Quantum Leap. The die was updated to be a 100-sided die, allowing any square on the board to be landed on for any episode.

The "Bangers", "The Naked Now", "The Traveller" and "Kanar with Damar" tiles were retired, "Caught In the Nebula" was renamed to Porthos Ate my Notes, and "Looking At Each Other During" was reintroduced. Several new tiles were added:

- The Xindi Arc: The hosts take shots of five different alcohols during the episode
- Reed Alert: The hosts drink pineapple-based cocktails
- Faith of the Heart: The hosts write new lyrics to the Enterprise theme
- Porthos Cheese Plate: The hosts review cheeses
- J/C: The host who rolled the square must write and read aloud slash fiction about one of the characters played by Jeffrey Combs
- Decontamination Chamber: Pranica and Harrison record the show in their underwear
- Temporal Cold War: The hosts read out and react to three bad reviews about the podcast
- Breadstick Power Hour: A power hour with breadsticks instead of shots

The board game was retired when the show concluded coverage of Enterprise and restarted The Next Generation. Each episode in The Next Generation rerun now ends with a different game created by one of the hosts for the other to play.

== Greatest Trek ==
Greatest Trek
- Genre: Comedy

Cast and voices
- Hosted by: Adam Pranica; Benjamin Ahr Harrison

Music
- Theme music composed by: Adam Ragusea
- Opening theme: The Greatest Discovery Theme (episodes 1–185); The Greatest Trek (186–present)
- Ending theme: The Greatest Discovery Theme (episodes 1–185); The Greatest Trek (186–present)

Production
- Production: Rob Schulte (episodes 1–126); Wynde Priddy (127–present)
- Length: 50-75 min.

Publication
- No. of episodes: 382 (as of July 12, 2026)
- Original release: September 22, 2017
- Provider: Uxbridge-Shimoda LLC
- Updates: Weekly (Thursdays)

Related
- Website: https://uxbridgeshimoda.com/

In 2017 Pranica and Harrison started a new podcast, The Greatest Discovery, following the launch of Star Trek: Discovery. It was billed as "the unofficial, irreverent and filthy aftershow" for Discovery and later other new Star Trek series.

The podcast, which is released the Friday after a new episode of Star Trek is aired, reviews each episode in the same format as The Greatest Generation. When there are no new episodes, the podcast is released monthly with Pranica and Harrison discussing Star Trek related news, interviewing guests and reviewing other Star Trek related media, such as comics and specific episodes of The Original Series.

Following the launch of Short Treks and the announcement of Star Trek: Picard, Pranica and Harrison announced that The Greatest Discovery would be used to review all upcoming Star Trek television properties, including Short Treks, Picard, Lower Decks, Strange New Worlds, in addition to Discovery. In August 2022, coinciding with the launch of Lower Decks season 3, the podcast was renamed Greatest Trek.

Guests featured on The Greatest Discovery and Greatest Trek include Star Trek actors Anson Mount, Tawny Newsome, Wil Wheaton, Mary Wiseman; comic artist J. K. Woodward; and Enterprise screenwriter Chris Black.

In 2025 and 2026, between the releases of Strange New Worlds and Starfleet Academy, the podcast began reviewing episodes of The Original Series with the subtitle This Old Enterprise, named in reference to the television show This Old House.

== Bonus podcasts ==
Pranica and Harrison occasionally release "bonus" podcast episodes featuring non-Star Trek media as part of The Greatest Generation and Greatest Trek.

These include:

- The Santa Monica Mountains Podcast: Reviewing episodes of Baywatch. Released as a subscriber bonus.
- Factory Seconds: Reviewing food eaten at The Cheesecake Factory. Released as a subscriber bonus.
- Quantum Leap: Reviewing episodes of Quantum Leap. Subscriber bonus episodes released as part of the Game of Buttholes veto mechanic in the Enterprise era of The Greatest Generation.
- Hot Cylon Summer: Reviewing episodes of Battlestar Galactica, released in 2025 as part of Greatest Trek during a hiatus of new Trek episodes.
- Film Fest: Reviewing classic science fiction movies, released as part of Greatest Trek during hiatuses between new Trek episodes.

== Reception ==
On February 14, 2016 Ars Technica published a review of the podcast titled "If you grew up watching ST:TNG, then you'll love this new podcast." On July 29, 2016, Slate's Sarah Archer offered a review of the podcast noting that the "show has lost a few listeners thanks to their willingness to bust the show's chops, other listeners (like me) delight in their clear affection for it and their admiration for its progressive ideals." Archer also stated the podcast was "more Mystery Science Theater 3000 than Comic-Con."
