= 12Stone =

12Stone Church
- 12Stone Church
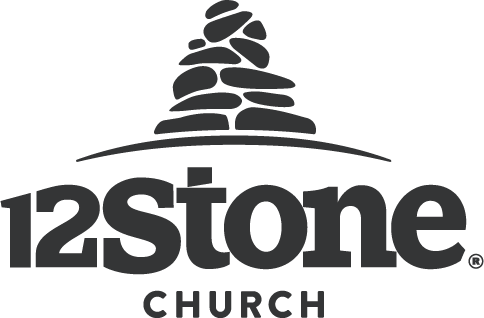
- 12Stone Church
- 33.99967°N 83.9900°W
- Location: Lawrenceville, GA based with various physical campuses and online.
- Country: United States
- Denomination: Wesleyan
- Website: 12stone.com

History
- Former name: Crossroads Community Church
- Status: Active
- Founded: November 1, 1987
- Founder: Kevin Myers

Clergy
- Pastor(s): Kevin Myers (Founding Pastor); Dr. Dan Reiland (Chief of Staff); Paul Nieman (Lawrenceville); Mark Eiken (Hamilton Mill); Frank Haynes (Flowery Branch); Michael Lumpkin (Sugarloaf); Matt Lewis (Braselton); Steve Walton (Buford); Trey Hildebrant (Snellville); Travis Billman (Online); Coye Bishop (Jackson County)

12Stone Church (also known simply as "12Stone") is an American Wesleyan multi-site megachurch with multiple locations in Gwinnett County, Georgia. Kevin Myers is the Founding Pastor, having transitioned out of the Senior Pastor role in 2023. Jason Berry currently serves as the Senior Pastor of 12Stone.

As of January 2026, there are ten physical 12Stone campuses located in Gwinnett County, Georgia, and Hall County, along with one out-of-state campus, in Summerville, South Carolina. 12Stone was listed in late 2010 as the #1 fastest growing church in America and as the fortieth largest church in the United States with an attendance of 9,636. 12Stone is the daughter church of Kentwood Community Church. In 2011 the average weekly attendance surpassed 10,000, making 12Stone the first Wesleyan Church to surpass this milestone.

== Locations ==
There are currently ten physical 12Stone campuses in Gwinnett, Hall, and Jackson counties and one location in Summerville, South Carolina.

== Controversies ==
In 2014, 12Stone church was involved in the arrest and conviction of David Justin Freeman, who had been a volunteer minister at the church. Freeman was arrested after 12stone pastor Jason Berry claimed Freeman had given him the middle finger. Freeman's conviction was ultimately overturned in 2017 on free speech grounds.

In 2016, 12Stone church was struck by vandals (whom the church reports did $10,000 worth of damage). The vandals left behind pamphlets describing their displeasure with the church's operations, and spray-painted scripture references suggesting that 12Stone church had turned God's house into a market.

The church and Kevin Myers (head pastor) have also made headlines for criticizing Colin Kaepernick's decision to protest by kneeling during the national anthem during a sermon, as well as a sermon in 2010 comparing acceptance of homosexuals to acceptance of pedophiles.

== See also ==
- List of megachurches in the United States
