= David Justin Freeman =

American Christian minister and civil servant

Elder Justin Freeman
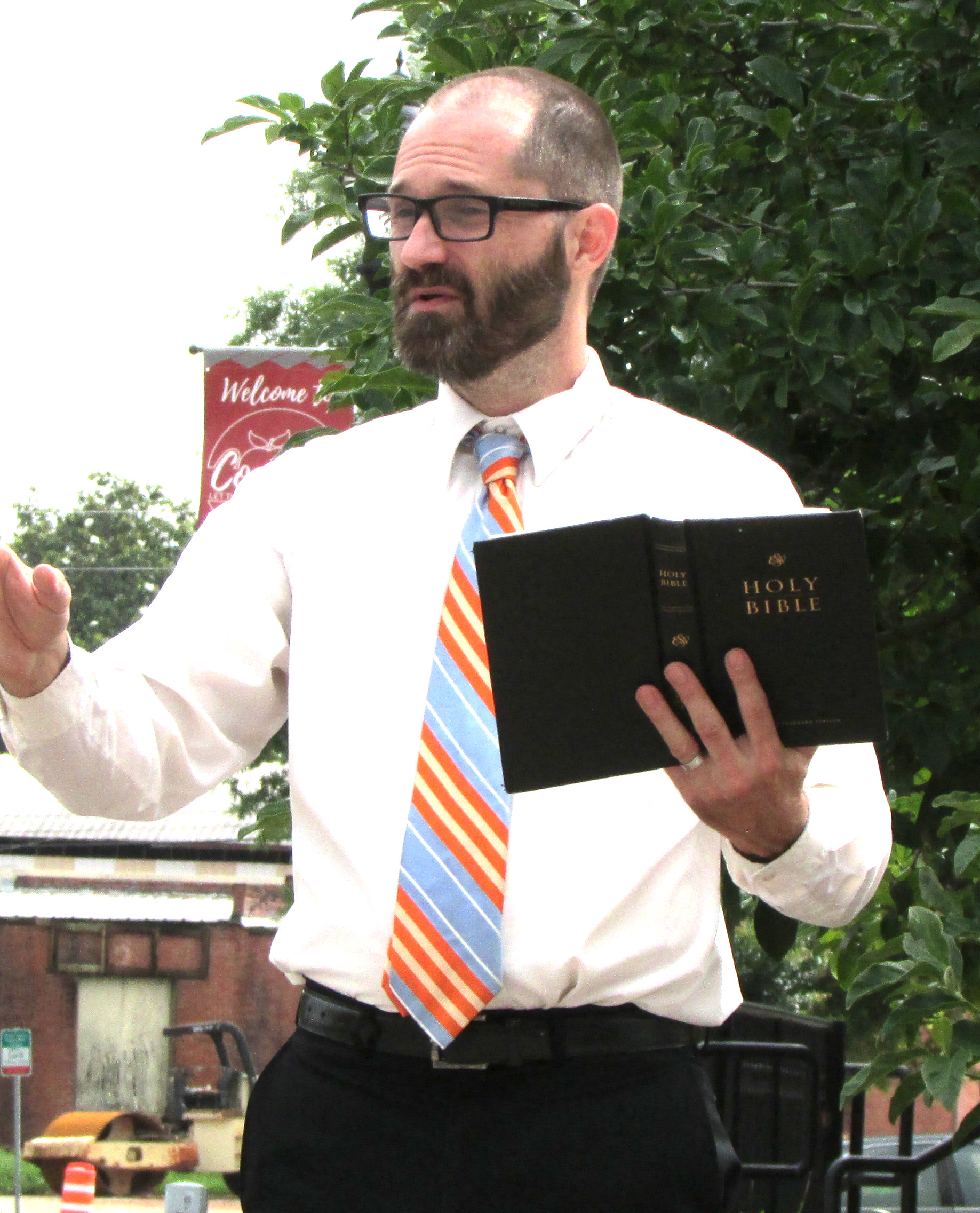
- Freeman in 2025

Personal details
- Born: David Justin Freeman; December 22, 1984 (age 41) Gwinnett County, Georgia

David Justin Freeman (born December 22, 1984) is a Christian minister, private educator and conservative political activist from the state of Georgia. He has been the teaching pastor at Clarkesville Reformed Baptist Church since 2021. Freeman is an advocate for free speech and independence of the church from the state. Freeman's teachings have made him a frequent target of police misconduct, most recently in 2024, when he was a victim of excessive force during an arrest for speech crimes. Videos from the incident were made public in season 1 of the documentary series The News! with Mr. Pipsqueak.

== Ministry ==
Freeman has been a preacher since 2016 and has an exegetical preaching style. Hundreds of his sermons are available in an online database. As of August 2025, according to the sermon-hosting website, Freeman has preached through approximately 45% of all the verses in the Bible.

Since 2021, Freeman has been the teaching pastor of Clarkesville Reformed Baptist Church, a theologically conservative independent Baptist church whose core doctrines are drawn from historical Baptist and Presbyterian confessions of faith, including the Westminster Confession of Faith (1646), the London Baptist Confession of Faith (1689), the New Hampshire Baptist Confession (1833), and The Baptist Faith and Message of the Southern Baptist Convention (2000). Freeman's church places a particular emphasis on personal study in the Bible; in 2024 one of his sons was recognized in the local newspaper for having read the entire Bible by the age of 7 years old.

== The School of Future Arts ==
Freeman founded the School of Future Arts in Clarkesville, Georgia, in August 2020. According to the 2022 student handbook, tuition payments by check had to be made out to him. The school operated for four years until its closure in July 2024. It offered lessons in coding, graphic design, and music with an emphasis on making video games. Many students performed in ensemble bands and recitals and participated in video game contests. Freeman annually presented to one student the "Rookie Game Maker of the Year" award.

== Political advocacy ==
Freeman became precinct chairman of the Hall County Republican Party in 2012, and that year served as a delegate for Hall County to the Georgia Republican Party's State Convention where he argued in favor of strict constitutional construction regarding a party resolution on the National Defense Authorization Act for Fiscal Year 2012. The next year, Freeman was voted in as chairman for the Georgia Ninth District of the Republican Liberty Caucus where he argued that the state party should abide strictly by its established rules. Freeman also took a leadership role in the Lanier Tea Party Patriots, where he twice served as a master of ceremonies for their annual tax-day rally.

Freeman with his family at the Tea Party Tax Day Rally in April 2014

In April 2013, at a Lanier Tea Party meeting, Freeman and Hall County Sheriff Gerald Couch disagreed concerning the constitutionality of federal laws that Freeman claimed overstepped the bounds of the Second Amendment. In the following months he filed several complaints to the Sheriff regarding his deputies speeding in patrol cars during non-emergencies, sometimes under particularly dangerous conditions.

== 12Stone Church incident ==
On August 3, 2014, Freeman attended services at 12Stone Church in Flowery Branch, Georgia, where he served as a volunteer minister to youths. Jason Berry (then pastor at that campus) displayed a video of a Staples commercial that portrayed children as being particularly depressed about returning to school while the parents celebrated. Freeman contended that he was displeased with the display because of youth in the church who had expressed suicidal thoughts in the lead-up to the new school year. In response, Freeman raised his middle finger to Berry. Freeman stated that it was his intention to object without disrupting the service, saying, "I believe that I would have been failing in my duty as a minister to the church and God if I had not confronted Jason for what he said, and I believe that I did so in the most appropriate way possible." When the church service had ended, Freeman stood and addressed the crowd: "It is your responsibility to raise your own children, and it is a sin to give them to a godless government."

=== Arrest, detention, and trial ===
According to testimony by multiple witnesses, Freeman was arrested at his home by a SWAT team armed with semiautomatic weapons and accompanied by a K9 unit. At trial, the state denied that a SWAT team had been at Freeman's home, but the arresting officer on record, Mike Lusk, had been identified previously in The Gainesville Times as a member of the Hall County SWAT team. Freeman later claimed in a lawsuit against Hall County Sheriff Gerald Couch that after his arrest he was held nude in solitary confinement, threatened with death, and denied bedding and basic hygiene items (among other abuses) during a three-day stay at the Hall County Detention Center. The lawsuit was dismissed by a federal judge.

Two of the officers most closely tied to Freeman's arrest left the Sheriff's office in disgrace shortly thereafter. The sergeant on duty at the time of Freeman's arrest resigned after he was caught having an on-duty affair with a Flowery Branch policewoman. The officer who arrested Freeman was himself arrested for an unrelated "Invasion of Privacy" charge on May 22, 2015, after a GBI investigation and was released on a $10,000 bond.

Stephanie Woodard, who had been the solicitor of Hall County and was responsible for the prosecution against Freeman, was ultimately charged with dozens of felonies for theft and making false statements after she was caught using taxpayer money for personal expenses. The allegations against Woodard included that she had conspired with the Hall County Sheriff to determine the outcome of cases. Woodard ultimately pleaded guilty to unprofessional conduct and was forced to resign and pay restitution.

In May 2015, charges against Freeman for obstruction and disrupting a public gathering were dismissed by Hall County State Court Judge Larry Baldwin; Georgia's disrupting a public gathering law had been declared unconstitutional in 2006. The state replaced these with a charge of disorderly conduct. Freeman was tried and convicted by a jury on January 11–12, 2016.

=== Appeal and argument before Supreme Court ===
On January 18, 2017, Freeman's appeal was transferred by the Georgia Court of Appeals to the Supreme Court of Georgia on the grounds that his free speech arguments raised a constitutional question over which the Court of Appeals did not have jurisdiction. Oral arguments in the case were held on May 15, 2017, with Freeman representing himself, and Daniel SanMiguel representing Hall County. Arguments focused primarily on whether Georgia's disorderly conduct statute is unconstitutionally broad, whether people have a constitutionally protected right to shout in a public place, and whether Freeman's conduct could possibly have violated the statute by representing a reasonable threat of harm. Freeman argued that the words tumultuous and reasonable are not clearly defined in the law and leave people to guess about their meaning. He also argued that the First Amendment protects ministers to speak controversial messages in their churches. SanMiguel argued that while none of Freeman's actions constituted obscenity or represented a reasonable threat in themselves, the actions taken as a whole represented disorderly conduct in their totality.

On October 2, 2017, the court reversed Freeman's disorderly conduct conviction because his conduct could not have violated Georgia's disorderly conduct statute and because the middle finger is protected speech.

== 2020 arrest and lawsuit ==
According to a lawsuit filed May 22, 2020, in U.S. District Court in Rome, Freeman drove past a traffic stop in Polk County and yelled an expletive at the officers. Officers Casey Wayne Lyall and Keith Streetman pursued Freeman. He was arrested and charged with disorderly conduct, reckless driving, and obstruction. Freeman was held for two days before being released. Freeman's lawsuit against the officers contends that his insult was political speech and protected by the First Amendment. His attorney stated that the arrest should never have occurred.
