= Adam Ragusea =

American culinary YouTuber (born 1982)

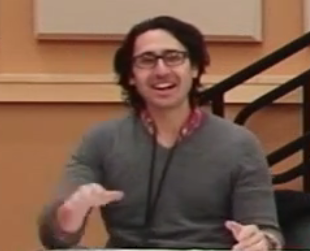
- Ragusea in 2014
- Born: Adam Conrad Ragusea; March 22, 1982 (age 44); Pennsylvania, U.S.
- Education: Pennsylvania State University; Indiana University Bloomington
- Occupations: YouTuber; Professor of journalism (former)

YouTube information
- Channel: Adam Ragusea
- Years active: 2010–present (first started producing food videos in 2017)
- Genres: Cooking; science journalism
- Subscribers: 2.62 million
- Views: 768 million
- Last updated: 29 November 2025
- Website: adamragusea.com

Adam Ragusea (/rəˈɡuːsiə/ rə-GOO-see-ə; born March 22, 1982) is an American YouTuber and educator who creates videos about food recipes, food science, and culinary culture. Until 2020, he was a professor of journalism at Mercer University.

== Early life and education ==
Ragusea was born on March 22, 1982. He grew up in State College, Pennsylvania. He attended the Eastman School of Music in Rochester, New York, but left before the end of his first year. He finished his bachelor's degree in music theory and composition at Pennsylvania State University in 2004. He completed all coursework towards a Master of Music at Indiana University Bloomington, but did not graduate.

== Career ==
=== Journalism ===
Ragusea began as a reporter in public media for the Indiana University-owned WFIU, before moving to WBUR-FM in Boston, and then Georgia Public Broadcasting (GPB). While at GPB, he served as the organization's Macon Bureau Chief and host of the local Morning Edition.

Ragusea was a journalist in residence at Mercer University from 2014 until February 2020, teaching introductory and advanced journalism, and media production classes, while coordinating with regional news outlets partnered with the university's journalism program. During his time at Mercer, Ragusea was the longtime host of and contributor to Current's The Pub, a trade podcast covering the public media industry.

=== YouTube ===
Ragusea created his YouTube channel on February 12, 2010, and his first videos were food recipes, made with the intention of sharing with his friends. His videos began to garner attention for his "straight-to-the-point" style that is influenced by his background in journalism. He also cites SpongeBob SquarePants as an influence on his style of comedy, describing it as "edgy but fundamentally [...] just a beam of bright sunshine". He launched "The Adam Ragusea Podcast" with the first episode "Dorian Yates Drumsticks" releasing on February 25, 2022. Ragusea announced that he would drop from his usual 2 videos a week along with the podcast to only 1 video a week plus the podcast on December 19, 2022, in a video titled "The next phase of our relationship".

== Personal life ==
Since mid-2021, Ragusea has lived in Knoxville, Tennessee, with his wife, novelist Lauren Morrill, and their two children. He previously lived in Macon, Georgia.

=== Political views ===
In 2023, he described himself as a "garden variety American center-left person" who is supportive of Ukraine during the Russian invasion of Ukraine. In a 2025 video, he described himself as "camp left".

== See also ==
- Joseph H. Bearns Prize
