= David Karliner =

Polish rabbi and author (1828–1915)

Rabbi David Friedman
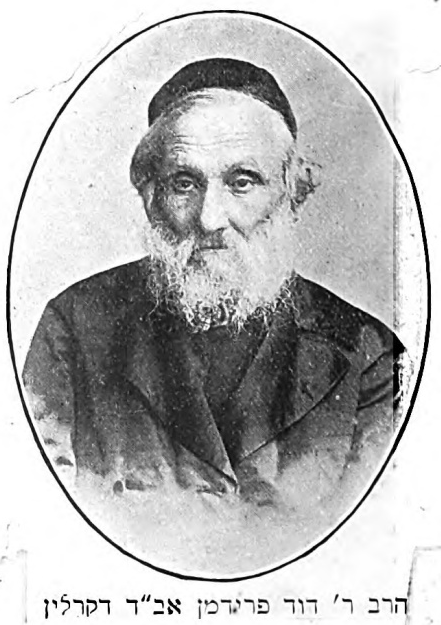

Personal life
- Born: 4 March 1828 Biała Podlaska, Poland
- Died: 18 February 1915 (aged 86)

Religious life
- Religion: Judaism

Rabbi David Friedman of Karlin (4 March 1828 – 18 February 1915), known as David Karliner, was one of the leading halachic authorities (poskim) of Lithuanian Jewry at the end of the 19th century and the beginning of the 20th century. He became notable for his support of the Hovevei Zion movement and his participation in the Katowice Conference.

== Biography ==
Friedman was born in Biała Podlaska, Poland to Rabbi Shmuel Friedman. His mother was the daughter of Rabbi Natan Nota, a halachic instructor in Brest-Litovsk. In his childhood he moved with his family to Warsaw, and in 1836, at the age of six, he went to live in his grandfather's home in Brisk. On the advice of the local rabbinic authority Rabbi Leib Katzenellenbogen, his grandfather sent him to Kamenitz to study under his eldest brother who lived there. He remained in Kamenitz until 1841.

Shmarya Luria, one of the wealthiest figures in Russian Jewry at the time, took him under his patronage and sent him to Shklov to study under his brother-in-law Rabbi Zalman Rivlin (son of Rabbi Hillel Rivlin). Under the influence of this teacher, he adopted his method of study, which focused on clarifying the words of the Chazal (rabbinic sages) and the Rishonim (early authorities), and minimized engagement with the works of the Acharonim (later authorities) and with pilpul (dialectical argumentation). In 1846 he married Sarah, the daughter of Shmarya Luria. For the following twenty years he lived in Mogilev at his father-in-law's home and devoted himself to Torah study. During these years his reputation grew and he became known as a great Torah scholar.

After the death of his father-in-law on 22 November 1865, he began seeking a rabbinical position, and in 1868 he was appointed as the rabbi of the city of Karlin (a suburb of Pinsk), serving in this role for fifty years.

He died on 18 February 1915.

== Public activity ==
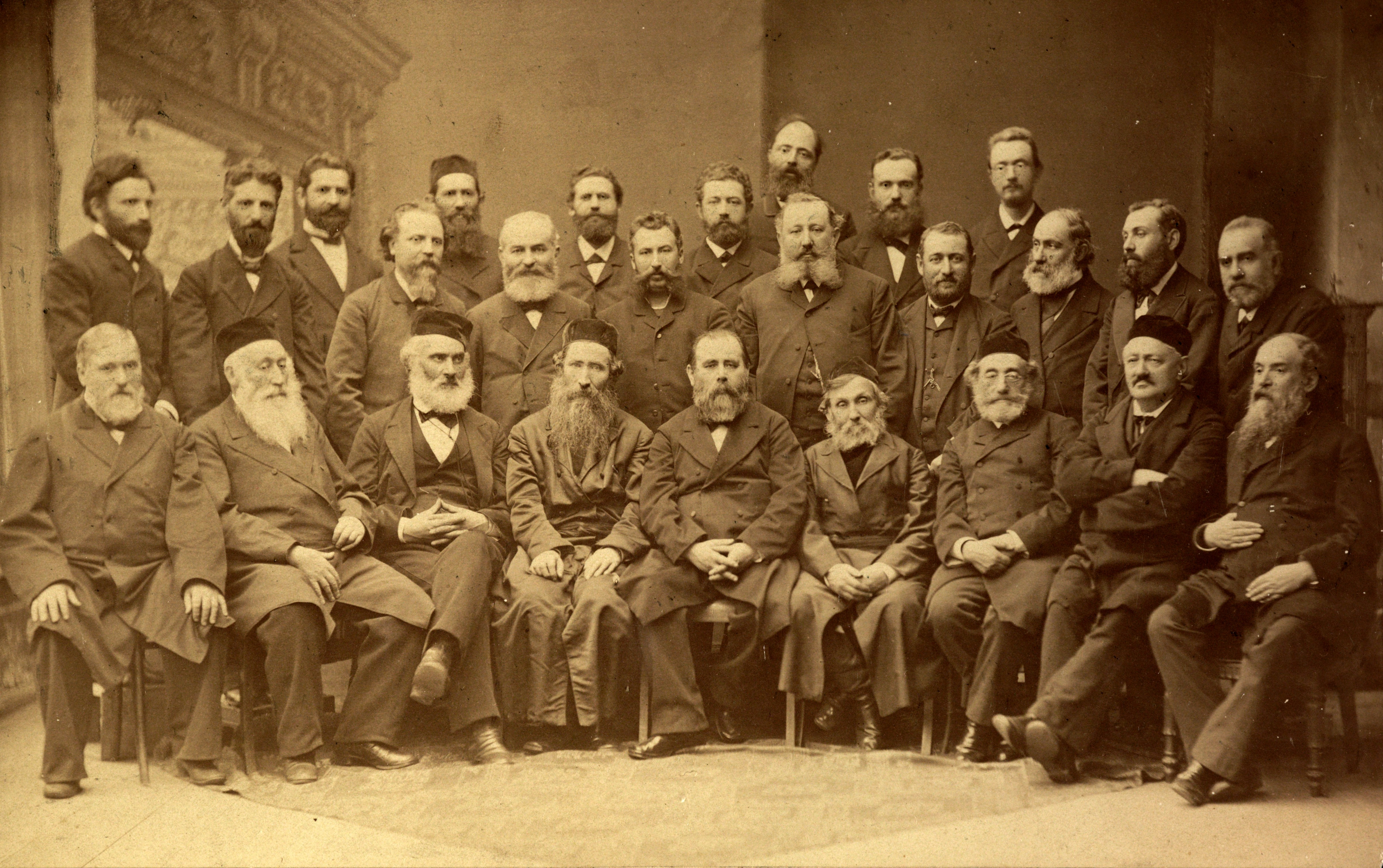
David Friedman of Karlin at the Katowice Conference (seated fourth from the right)

Following the publication of Rabbi Tzvi Hirsch Kalischer's book Derishat Zion, he strongly opposed the idea of renewing the sacrificial service, a concept that Rabbi Kalischer had raised. Nevertheless, he expressed support for the matter of settlement in the Land of Israel, and later lent his hand to the Hovevei Zion (Lovers of Zion) movement, even participating in the Katowice Conference (1884).

In 1880 he came to the defense of his brother-in-law, Yechiel Michel Pines, against a cherem (excommunication) imposed by some of the sages of Jerusalem. He composed a treatise called Emek Berachah, containing a comprehensive halachic analysis of the matters of bans, decrees, and communal ordinances, in which he extensively addressed and refuted the possible arguments of those who had issued the excommunication.

He was among the opponents of the heter mechirah (the legal sale of land to avoid sabbatical year restrictions) during the shemitah year of 1888/1889, but out of consideration for the newly reestablished settlements in the Land of Israel and in order to prevent their ruin, he leaned toward permitting forms of labor that are not prohibited by Torah law, through the enactment of a special ordinance with the agreement of the majority of Jewish sages.

Alongside his support for Hovevei Zion, a letter by Rabbi Friedman condemning breaches of religious observance was printed in the pamphlet Or LaYesharim in 1900, which was written "against the Zionist approach." In the letter he states that in his opinion one should not openly speak out against these phenomena: "to heed the advice of the visionary — and the wise man in that time should remain silent, for silence in this matter is better than speech, and the owner of the vineyard will come and clear the thorns from the vineyard."

In 1913 he spoke out against the Society for the Promotion of Culture among the Jews of Russia over its desire to introduce secular studies into ultra-Orthodox educational institutions.

== Works ==
Beyond the writings published during his lifetime, Rabbi David Friedman left behind a great many manuscripts. In the introduction to his work Piskei Halachot he wrote that after fifty years of toil he had arrived at a clear understanding of the majority of areas of Torah law, but most of his writings were lost during World War I. The small portion that survived was published by Mossad HaRav Kook as the third part of the work Piskei Halachot Yad David in 1971.

- The responsa collection Sha'ilat David. Printed in 1913.
- Piskei Halachot - Yad David on the laws of marriage — three volumes.
