= Stephen Jaffe =

American composer (born 1954)

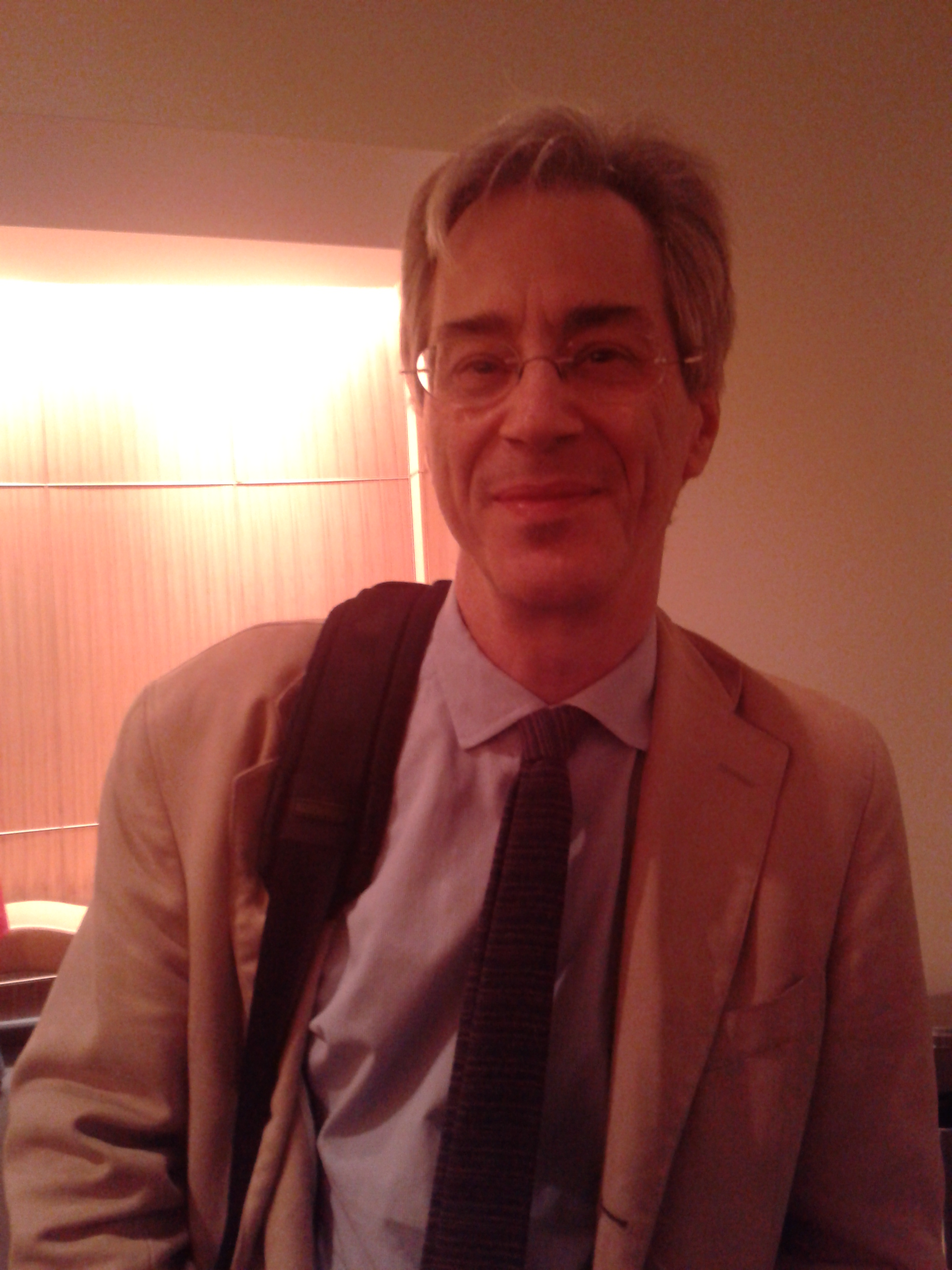
Stephen Jaffe after a performance of his Homage to the Breath by the 21st Century Consort at the Smithsonian American Art Museum in 2015.

Stephen Jaffe (born December 30, 1954, in Washington, D.C.) is an American composer of contemporary classical music. He lives in Durham, North Carolina, United States, and serves on the music faculty of Duke University, where he holds the post of Mary and James H. Semans Professor of Music Composition.

Jaffe's music has been performed in the United States and Europe by ensembles including the National Symphony Orchestra, the North Carolina Symphony, and the Ciompi Quartet, and has been recorded on the Bridge and New Focus labels. His honors include the Rome Prize, a Guggenheim Fellowship, the Kennedy Center Friedheim Award, and, in 2012, election to the American Academy of Arts and Letters.

== Early life and education ==
Jaffe was born in Washington, D.C., in 1954 into a musical family; his brother, Andy Jaffe, became a jazz pianist, composer, and educator. As a teenager he studied at the Conservatoire de Musique in Geneva, Switzerland. Returning to the United States in the early 1970s, he studied at the University of Massachusetts before entering the University of Pennsylvania, where he graduated summa cum laude with distinction in music in 1977 and completed a master's degree in composition in 1978. At Pennsylvania his teachers included George Crumb, George Rochberg, and Richard Wernick.

== Career ==
Jaffe joined the faculty of Duke University in 1981 and was appointed the Mary D.B.T. and James H. Semans Distinguished Professor of Music Composition in 1999. With colleagues he founded and long directed Duke's contemporary-music concert series, Encounters: With the Music of Our Time, and helped establish the university's doctoral program in composition. Active as a pianist and conductor as well as a composer, Jaffe was a founder of the Penn Composers Guild and later directed Soloists and Composers at Philadelphia's Painted Bride Art Center. He has also taught at Swarthmore College and Moravian College, and has held residencies and guest appointments at many universities and schools of music, including as Abravanel Distinguished Composer at the University of Utah (2015) and as Master Artist at the Atlantic Center for the Arts (2007).

=== Music ===
Critics have described Jaffe's music as combining rhythmic energy and lyricism with a personal harmonic language that draws freely on tonal and modal reference points. His output spans orchestral works, a series of chamber concertos, string quartets, and vocal music, and he has frequently collaborated with writers and visual artists.

Among his orchestral works are the Concerto for Cello and Orchestra — premiered by the National Symphony Orchestra under Leonard Slatkin with soloist David Hardy, and given its European premiere by Hardy with the Slovenska filharmonija (Slovenian Philharmonic) under Toshihiro Yonezu — and works written for the North Carolina Symphony including Poetry of the Piedmont and Cíthara mea (Evocations): Spanish Music Notebook for Orchestra. His Concerto for Violin and Orchestra was written for violinist Nicholas Kitchen and recorded by Gregory Fulkerson with the Odense Symphony Orchestra of Denmark. The Durham Symphony Orchestra, under its music director William Henry Curry, commissioned Still Life with Blue (premiered 2013), a work drawing on blues and jazz idioms that Jaffe later incorporated as the first movement of his orchestral suite Southern Lights.

Jaffe's collaborative cantata A Forest Unfolding (2018), written with composers Melinda Wagner, Eric Moe, and David Kirkland Garner, sets texts assembled by the novelist Richard Powers on the interconnection of humans and trees. The nine-movement work was commissioned by Electric Earth Concerts and premiered at the Portland Chamber Music Festival; it has since been performed widely, including at the Aspen Music Festival in 2023, where Renée Fleming and Powers served as narrators, and received its New York premiere from the ensemble Decoda at Carnegie Hall in 2025. A recording was released on New Focus Recordings in 2026.

His chamber music includes a numbered series of chamber concertos, among them Singing Figures (No. 1) for oboe and ensemble, Light Dances (No. 2), Migrations (No. 4), and Three Arcs (No. 5). Three Arcs (Chamber Concerto No. 5) was commissioned by the Musical Fund Society of Philadelphia through its Edwin G. McCollin Fund competition as part of the society's bicentennial celebrations, written for Philadelphia's Network for New Music, and premiered on May 1, 2022, at the Kimmel Cultural Campus's Perelman Theater alongside bicentennial commissions by Tania León, Roberto Sierra, and Augusta Read Thomas. He has written three string quartets; the String Quartet No. 3 ("A Tapestry"), composed for the Ciompi Quartet, appears on their 2025 album A Duke Moment. His vocal works of the 1980s and 1990s include the cantata Songs of Turning, premiered at the Oregon Bach Festival in 1996, and song cycles setting the poetry of Robert Francis, Denise Levertov, and Mary Oliver. He has also received commissions from the Fromm Music Foundation at Harvard University and the Walter W. Naumburg Foundation.

== Awards and recognition ==
- Elected member, American Academy of Arts and Letters (2012)
- Koussevitsky International Recording Award (KIRA) from the Musicians Club of New York (November 2006) – for Concerto for Violin and Orchestra
- Composer of the Year from the Classical Recording Society (November 2005)
- Aaron Copland Foundation for Music (2002) – for Concerto for Violin and Orchestra and Chamber Concerto ("Singing Figures")
- Howard Foundation Fellowship from Brown University (1996)
- American Academy and Institute of Arts and Letters Lifetime Achievement Prize (May 1993)
- Best Newly Published Music Citation from the National Flute Association (1991) – for Three Figures and a Ground
- Kennedy Center Friedheim Award (May 1991) – for First Quartet, recorded by the Ciompi Quartet
- Brandeis University Creative Arts Citation (May 1989)
- Guggenheim Fellowship (May 1984)
- Composer Fellowship from the National Endowment for the Arts (1980)
- Rome Prize administered by the American Academy in Rome (1980)
- Joseph H. Bearns Prize for Four Nocturnes (1976)
- Student Composer Award from BMI (1975) – for the symphony Three Lives
- Premier Medaille d’harmonie from the Conservatoire de Musique in Geneva (May 1972)

== Selected works ==
=== Orchestral ===
- Four Images for Orchestra (1982; 1987)
- Concerto for Violin and Orchestra (2000)
- Concerto for Cello and Orchestra (2003)
- Poetry of the Piedmont (2006)
- Cíthara mea (Evocations): Spanish Music Notebook for Orchestra (2008)
- Southern Lights, orchestral suite (Still Life with Blue; Cut Time; A Smile), premiered by the Durham Symphony Orchestra (2013)
- A Symphony of Spiral and Light (Parades), for wind, brass, and percussion (2019)

=== Chamber concertos ===
- Singing Figures (Chamber Concerto No. 1), for oboe and ensemble (1996)
- Light Dances (Chamber Concerto No. 2) (2010)
- Hip Concerto (Chamber Concerto No. 3), for period or modern instruments (2013)
- Migrations (Chamber Concerto No. 4), for "walking" violin soloist and ensemble (2018)
- Three Arcs (Chamber Concerto No. 5) (2022)
- Inscriptions (Chamber Concerto No. 6), double concerto for flute, bassoon, and string quintet (2025)

=== Chamber and instrumental ===
- First Quartet (1991)
- String Quartet No. 2 ("Aeolian and Sylvan Figures") (2005)
- String Quartet No. 3 ("A Tapestry") (2014)
- Spinoff, for guitar (1998)
- Sonata (in Four Parts), for cello and piano (2008)
- Tableaux, for piano (2022)
- Sea Light, for piano (2024)

=== Vocal and choral ===
- Four Songs with Ensemble (1988)
- Fort Juniper Songs, for soprano, mezzo-soprano, and piano (1989)
- Songs of Turning, for chorus and orchestra (1996)
- Homage to the Breath, for mezzo-soprano and ten instruments (2001)
- A Forest Unfolding, collaborative cantata (2018)
- We Are Here: Eight Choruses from the North, for SATB chorus a cappella (2025)

== Discography ==
- Stephen Jaffe: The Rhythm of the Running Plough, Double Sonata, Four Songs with Ensemble (Bridge, 1994)
- Newdance: 18 Dances for Guitar (Bridge, 1998) – includes Spinoff, performed by David Starobin
- The Music of Stephen Jaffe, Vol. 2 (Bridge, 2004) – Violin Concerto; Chamber Concerto ("Singing Figures") for Oboe and Ensemble
- The Music of Stephen Jaffe, Vol. 3 (Bridge, 2009) – Cello Concerto; Poetry of the Piedmont; Homage to the Breath; Cut Time
- The Music of Stephen Jaffe, Vol. 4 (Bridge, 2022) – Light Dances (Chamber Concerto No. 2); String Quartet No. 2 ("Aeolian and Sylvan Figures"); Sonata (in Four Parts)
- A Duke Moment (New Focus Recordings, 2025) – Ciompi Quartet; includes String Quartet No. 3 ("A Tapestry")
- A Forest Unfolding (New Focus Recordings, 2026)
